= 2011–12 Milwaukee Bucks season =

NBA professional basketball team season

- Head coach: Scott Skiles
- General manager: John Hammond
- Owners: Herb Kohl
- Arena: Bradley Center

Results
- Record: 31–35 (.470)
- Place: Division: 3rd (Central); Conference: 9th (Eastern)
- Playoff finish: Did not qualify
- Stats at Basketball Reference

Local media
- Television: Fox Sports Wisconsin
- Radio: WTMJ (AM)

The 2011–12 Milwaukee Bucks season was the 44th season of the franchise in the National Basketball Association (NBA). For the first time since 1999–2000 season, Michael Redd was not on the opening day roster. The Bucks finished the season with a 31–35 record and in 9th place in the Eastern Conference, four games behind the Philadelphia 76ers, who claimed the last berth for the 2012 NBA Playoffs. The regular season was reduced from its usual 82 games to 66 due to the lockout.

== Key dates ==
- June 23: The 2011 NBA draft took place at Prudential Center in Newark, New Jersey.
- December 26: Milwaukee started the regular season with a loss against the Charlotte Bobcats.

== Roster ==
2011–12 Milwaukee Bucks roster
Players

Pos.	No.	Player	Height	Weight	DOB	From
F	40	Jon Brockman	6 ft 7 in (2.01 m)	255 lb (116 kg)	1987–03–20	Washington
C	54	Kwame Brown (injured)	6 ft 11 in (2.11 m)	270 lb (122 kg)	1982–03–10	Glynn Academy
G/F	10	Carlos Delfino	6 ft 6 in (1.98 m)	230 lb (104 kg)	1982–08–29	Argentina
G/F	17	Mike Dunleavy Jr.	6 ft 9 in (2.06 m)	230 lb (104 kg)	1980–09–15	Duke
G	11	Monta Ellis	6 ft 3 in (1.91 m)	185 lb (84 kg)	1985–10–26	Lanier HS (MS)
F	0	Drew Gooden	6 ft 10 in (2.08 m)	250 lb (113 kg)	1981–09–24	Kansas
F	15	Tobias Harris	6 ft 8 in (2.03 m)	226 lb (103 kg)	1992–07–15	Tennessee
F	7	Ersan İlyasova	6 ft 10 in (2.08 m)	235 lb (107 kg)	1987–05–15	Turkey
G	3	Brandon Jennings	6 ft 1 in (1.85 m)	169 lb (77 kg)	1989–09–23	Oak Hill Academy (VA)
F	30	Jon Leuer	6 ft 10 in (2.08 m)	228 lb (103 kg)	1989–05–14	Wisconsin
G	9	Shaun Livingston	6 ft 7 in (2.01 m)	175 lb (79 kg)	1985–09–11	Peoria Central HS (IL)
F	12	Luc Mbah a Moute	6 ft 8 in (2.03 m)	230 lb (104 kg)	1986–09–09	UCLA
F/C	8	Larry Sanders	6 ft 11 in (2.11 m)	235 lb (107 kg)	1988–11–21	VCU
G	19	Beno Udrih	6 ft 3 in (1.91 m)	205 lb (93 kg)	1982–07–05	Slovenia
F	13	Ekpe Udoh	6 ft 10 in (2.08 m)	245 lb (111 kg)	1987–05–20	Baylor

Coaches
Head coach
- Scott Skiles
Assistant(s)
- Jim Boylan
- Joe Wolf
- Sidney Moncrief
- Bill Peterson
- Anthony Goldwire

Legend
- (DP) Unsigned draft pick
- (FA) Free agent
- (S) Suspended
- Injured

== Pre-season ==
Due to the 2011 NBA lockout negotiations, the programmed pre-season schedule, along with the first two weeks of the regular season were scrapped, and a two-game pre-season was set for each team once the lockout concluded.

2011 pre-season game log
Pre-season: 0–2 (home: 0–1; road: 0–1)

Game	Date	Team	Score	High points	High rebounds	High assists	Location Attendance	Record
1	December 17	@ Minnesota	L 96–117	Jon Leuer (18)	Andrew Bogut (6)	Mike Dunleavy Jr. (5)	Target Center; 15,013	0–1
2	December 21	Minnesota	L 84–85	Drew Gooden (15)	Ersan İlyasova (6)	Brandon Jennings (9)	Bradley Center	0–2

2011–12 season schedule

== Regular season ==
=== Standings ===
Central Division	W	L	PCT	GB	Home	Road	Div	GP
z-Chicago Bulls	50	16	.758	–	26–7	24–9	13–1	66
x-Indiana Pacers	42	24	.636	8	23–10	19–14	9–4	66
Milwaukee Bucks	31	35	.470	19	17–16	14–19	7–8	66
Detroit Pistons	25	41	.379	25	18–15	7–26	4–11	66
Cleveland Cavaliers	21	45	.318	29	11–22	10–23	3–12	66

Eastern Conference
#	Team	W	L	PCT	GB	GP
1	z-Chicago Bulls	50	16	.758	–	66
2	y-Miami Heat *	46	20	.697	4.0	66
3	x-Indiana Pacers *	42	24	.636	8.0	66
4	y-Boston Celtics	39	27	.591	11.0	66
5	x-Atlanta Hawks	40	26	.606	10.0	66
6	x-Orlando Magic	37	29	.561	13.0	66
7	x-New York Knicks	36	30	.545	14.0	66
8	x-Philadelphia 76ers	35	31	.530	15.0	66
9	Milwaukee Bucks	31	35	.470	19.0	66
10	Detroit Pistons	25	41	.379	25.0	66
11	Toronto Raptors	23	43	.348	27.0	66
12	New Jersey Nets	22	44	.333	28.0	66
13	Cleveland Cavaliers	21	45	.318	29.0	66
14	Washington Wizards	20	46	.303	30.0	66
15	Charlotte Bobcats	7	59	.106	43.0	66

=== Game log ===
2011–12 game log
Total: 31–35 (Home: 17–16; Road: 14–19)
December: 2–1 (home: 2–0; road: 0–1)

Game	Date	Team	Score	High points	High rebounds	High assists	Location Attendance	Record
1	December 26	@ Charlotte	L 95–96	Brandon Jennings (22)	Andrew Bogut; Ersan İlyasova (9)	Shaun Livingston (6)	Time Warner Cable Arena; 17,173	0–1
2	December 27	Minnesota	W 98–95	Brandon Jennings (24)	Andrew Bogut (9)	Mike Dunleavy Jr. (8)	Bradley Center; 17,352	1–1
3	December 30	Washington	W 102–81	Brandon Jennings (22)	Andrew Bogut (15)	Brandon Jennings (5)	Bradley Center; 17,065	2–1

January: 7–10 (home: 4–2; road: 3–8)

Game	Date	Team	Score	High points	High rebounds	High assists	Location Attendance	Record
4	January 2	@ Denver	L 86–91	Stephen Jackson (17)	Carlos Delfino (9)	Three players (4)	Pepsi Center; 14,142	2–2
5	January 3	@ Utah	L 73–85	Drew Gooden (24)	Drew Gooden (12)	Brandon Jennings (9)	EnergySolutions Arena; 17,756	2–3
6	January 5	@ Sacramento	L 100–103	Brandon Jennings (31)	Drew Gooden (9)	Brandon Jennings (7)	Power Balance Pavilion; 11,813	2–4
7	January 7	@ L. A. Clippers	L 86–92	Brandon Jennings (21)	Drew Gooden (13)	Brandon Jennings (7)	Staples Center; 19,229	2–5
8	January 8	@ Phoenix	L 93–109	Tobias Harris (15)	Ersan İlyasova (8)	Brandon Jennings; Shaun Livingston (4)	US Airways Center; 13,420	2–6
9	January 10	San Antonio	W 106–103	Stephen Jackson (34)	Andrew Bogut (11)	Brandon Jennings (11)	Bradley Center; 11,585	3–6
10	January 12	Detroit	W 102–93	Brandon Jennings (27)	Four players (6)	Stephen Jackson (6)	Bradley Center; 11,465	4–6
11	January 13	@ Dallas	L 76–102	Brandon Jennings (19)	Jon Brockman (9)	Delonte West (4)	American Airlines Center; 20,112	4–7
12	January 16	@ Philadelphia	L 82–94	Jrue Holiday (24)	Andrew Bogut (11)	Louis Williams (6)	Wells Fargo Center; 17,281	4–8
13	January 17	Denver	L 95–105	Brandon Jennings (30)	Ersan İlyasova (11)	Andre Miller (11)	Bradley Center; 11,322	4–9
14	January 20	@ New York	W 100–86	Brandon Jennings (36)	Tyson Chandler (12)	Brandon Jennings (5)	Madison Square Garden; 19,763	5–9
15	January 22	@ Miami	W 91–82	LeBron James (28)	LeBron James (13)	Brandon Jennings (6)	American Airlines Arena; 19,600	6–9
16	January 23	Atlanta	L 92–97	Joe Johnson (26)	Zaza Pachulia (14)	Brandon Jennings (12)	Bradley Center; 13,048	6–10
17	January 25	@ Houston	W 105–99	Kevin Martin (29)	Ersan İlyasova (19)	Kyle Lowry (10)	Toyota Center; 10,573	7–10
18	January 27	@ Chicago	L 100–107	Derrick Rose (34)	Joakim Noah (16)	Drew Gooden (6)	United Center; 22,368	7–11
19	January 28	L. A. Lakers	W 100–89	Kobe Bryant (27)	Pau Gasol (15)	Kobe Bryant (9)	Bradley Center; 18,027	8–11
20	January 30	Detroit	W 103–82	Brandon Jennings (21)	Greg Monroe (10)	Beno Udrih (6)	Bradley Center; 13,103	9–11

February: 5–10 (home: 2–6; road: 3–4)

Game	Date	Team	Score	High points	High rebounds	High assists	Location Attendance	Record
21	February 1	Miami	W 105–97	LeBron James (40)	Ersan İlyasova (14)	Brandon Jennings (8)	Bradley Center; 16,116	10–11
22	February 3	@ Detroit	L 80–88	Brandon Knight (26)	Ersan İlyasova (12)	Brandon Knight (7)	The Palace of Auburn Hills; 13,181	10–12
23	February 4	Chicago	L 90–113	Derrick Rose (26)	Luol Deng (9)	Derrick Rose (13)	Bradley Center; 18,717	10–13
24	February 7	Phoenix	L 105–107	Drew Gooden (25)	Josh Childress (12)	Steve Nash (11)	Bradley Center; 13,203	10–14
25	February 8	@ Toronto	W 105–99	Carlos Delfino (25)	Drew Gooden (14)	José Calderón (15)	Air Canada Centre; 15,291	11–14
26	February 10	@ Cleveland	W 113–112 (OT)	Antawn Jamison (34)	Tristan Thompson (13)	Ramon Sessions (16)	Quicken Loans Arena; 15,195	12–14
27	February 11	Orlando	L 94–99	Jason Richardson (31)	Ersan İlyasova (16)	Hedo Türkoğlu (6)	Bradley Center; 17,723	12–15
28	February 13	Miami	L 96–114	LeBron James (35)	Mike Miller (8)	Chris Bosh (4)	Bradley Center; 16,749	12–16
29	February 15	New Orleans	L 89–92	Ersan İlyasova (23)	Gustavo Ayon (12)	Greivis Vásquez (7)	Bradley Center; 12,829	12–17
30	February 17	@ Orlando	L 85–94	Dwight Howard (26)	Dwight Howard (20	Hedo Türkoğlu (7)	Amway Arena; 18,846	12–18
31	February 19	@ New Jersey	W 92–85	Ersan İlyasova (29)	Ersan İlyasova (25)	Shaun Livingston (6)	Prudential Center; 15,262	13–18
32	February 20	Orlando	L 90–93	Dwight Howard (28)	Dwight Howard (16)	Carlos Delfino (8)	Bradley Center; 13,143	13–19
33	February 22	@ Chicago	L 91–110	Carlos Boozer (20)	Joakim Noah (13)	Joakim Noah (10)	United Center; 21,507	13–20
34	February 28	Washington	W 119–118	Mike Dunleavy Jr. (28)	Ersan İlyasova (11)	John Wall (15)	Bradley Center; 13,548	14–20
35	February 29	@ Boston	L 96–102	Kevin Garnett (25)	Chris Wilcox (13)	Rajon Rondo (10)	TD Garden; 18,624	14–21

March: 10–7 (home: 4–4; road: 6–3)

Game	Date	Team	Score	High points	High rebounds	High assists	Location Attendance	Record
36	March 2	@ Atlanta	L 94–99	Brandon Jennings (34)	Josh Smith (19)	Brandon Jennings (9)	Philips Arena; 13,311	14–22
37	March 3	@ Orlando	L 98–114	Dwight Howard (28)	Dwight Howard (14)	Jameer Nelson (10)	Amway Arena; 18,846	14–23
38	March 5	Philadelphia	W 97–93	Brandon Jennings (33)	Ersan İlyasova (18)	Brandon Jennings (7)	Bradley Center; 12,315	15–23
39	March 7	Chicago	L 104–106	Ersan İlyasova (32)	Ersan İlyasova (10)	Beno Udrih (7)	Bradley Center; 15,389	15–24
40	March 9	New York	W 119–114	Ersan İlyasova (26)	Larry Sanders (11)	Brandon Jennings (10)	Bradley Center; 18,717	16–24
41	March 11	@ Toronto	W 105–99	Ersan İlyasova (31)	Ersan İlyasova (12)	Mike Dunleavy Jr. Brandon Jennings (6)	Air Canada Centre; 17,316	17–24
42	March 12	@ New Jersey	W 105–99	Brandon Jennings (34)	Drew Gooden (8)	Three players (7)	Prudential Center; 12,930	18–24
43	March 14	Cleveland	W 115–105	Ersan İlyasova (22)	Luc Mbah a Moute (13)	Drew Gooden (13)	Bradley Center; 15,319	19–24
44	March 16	@ Golden State	W 120–98	Mike Dunleavy Jr. (24)	Luc Mbah a Moute (17)	Beno Udrih (9)	Oracle Arena; 19,596	20–24
45	March 20	@ Portland	W 116–87	Drew Gooden (19)	Ekpe Udoh (6)	Monta Ellis (9)	Rose Garden; 20,387	21–24
46	March 22	Boston	L 91–100	Brandon Jennings (19)	Ersan İlyasova (14)	Monta Ellis (7)	Bradley Center; 15,171	21–25
47	March 23	@ Charlotte	W 112–92	Luc Mbah a Moute (20)	Drew Gooden (12)	Beno Udrih (8)	Time Warner Cable Arena; 13,729	22–25
48	March 24	Indiana	L 104–125	Ersan İlyasova (22)	Ersan İlyasova (8)	Monta Ellis (6)	Bradley Center; 16,207	22–26
49	March 26	@ New York	L 80–89	Mike Dunleavy Jr. (26)	Luc Mbah a Moute (7)	Brandon Jennings (5)	Madison Square Garden; 19,763	22–27
50	March 27	Atlanta	W 108–101	Monta Ellis (33)	Josh Smith (18)	Monta Ellis (8)	Bradley Center; 12,223	23–27
51	March 30	@ Cleveland	W 121–84	Kyrie Irving (29)	Tristan Thompson (11)	Beno Udrih (10)	Quicken Loans Arena; 16,099	24–27
52	March 31	Memphis	L 95–99	Brandon Jennings (24)	Ersan İlyasova (16)	Monta Ellis (5)	Bradley Center; 17,106	24–28

April: 7–6 (home: 5–4; road: 2–2)

Game	Date	Team	Score	High points	High rebounds	High assists	Location Attendance	Record
53	April 2	@ Washington	W 112–98	Jordan Crawford (23)	Ersan İlyasova (11)	John Wall (9)	Verizon Center; 16,234	25–28
54	April 4	Cleveland	W 107–98	Monta Ellis (30)	Tristan Thompson (9)	Monta Ellis (8)	Bradley Center; 11,849	26–28
55	April 6	Charlotte	W 95–90	Byron Mullens (31)	Ersan İlyasova (15)	Brandon Jennings (9)	Bradley Center; 13,374	27–28
56	April 7	Portland	W 116–94	Beno Udrih (21)	Ersan İlyasova (12)	Raymond Felton (10)	Bradley Center; 14,969	28–28
57	April 9	Oklahoma City	L 89–109	Russell Westbrook (26)	Russell Westbrook (7)	Kevin Durant (8)	Bradley Center; 14,111	28–29
58	April 11	New York	L 107–111	Monta Ellis (35)	Tyson Chandler (11)	Monta Ellis (10)	Bradley Center; 15,534	28–30
59	April 13	@ Detroit	W 113–97	Drew Gooden (26)	Greg Monroe (10)	Brandon Jennings (10)	The Palace of Auburn Hills; 15,255	29–30
60	April 14	Indiana	L 99–105	Monta Ellis (20)	Roy Hibbert (14)	Brandon Jennings (10)	Bradley Center; 15,143	29–31
61	April 18	@ Washington	L 112–121	Jordan Crawford (32)	Drew Gooden (12)	John Wall (10)	Verizon Center; 14,141	29–32
62	April 19	@ Indiana	L 109–118	Danny Granger (29)	David West (14)	George Hill (18)	Bankers Life Fieldhouse; 12,453	29–33
63	April 21	New Jersey	W 106–95	Brandon Jennings (30)	Ersan İlyasova (17)	Brandon Jennings (6)	Bradley Center; 15,939	30–33
64	April 23	Toronto	W 92–86	Brandon Jennings (25)	Ersan İlyasova (15)	Two players (5)	Bradley Center; 13,867	31–33
65	April 25	Philadelphia	L 85–90	Evan Turner (29)	Tobias Harris; Evan Turner (13)	Beno Udrih (9)	Bradley Center; 13,489	31–34
66	April 26	@ Boston	L 74–87	Tobias Harris (16)	Tobias Harris; Brandon Bass (9)	Rajon Rondo (15)	TD Garden; 18,624	31–35

2011–12 season schedule

== Player statistics ==
Legend
GP	Games played	GS	Games started	MPG	Minutes per game
FG%	Field-goal percentage	3P%	3-point field-goal percentage	FT%	Free-throw percentage
RPG	Rebounds per game	APG	Assists per game	SPG	Steals per game
BPG	Blocks per game	PPG	Points per game

=== Regular season ===
Milwaukee Bucks statistics
Player	GP	GS	MPG	FG%	3P%	FT%	RPG	APG	SPG	BPG	PPG
Andrew Bogut ^{[a]}	12	12	30.3	.449	.000	.609	8.3	2.6	1.0	2.0	11.3
Jon Brockman	35	0	6.8	.333	.000	.467	2.1	.3	.1	.0	1.1
Carlos Delfino	54	53	28.5	.402	.360	.792	3.9	2.3	1.5	.2	9.0
Mike Dunleavy Jr.	55	3	26.3	.474	.399	.811	3.7	2.1	.5	.1	12.3
Monta Ellis ^{[a]}	21	21	36.0	.432	.267	.764	3.5	5.9	1.4	.3	17.6
Drew Gooden	56	46	26.2	.437	.291	.846	6.5	2.6	.8	.6	13.7
Tobias Harris	42	9	11.4	.467	.261	.815	2.4	.5	.3	.2	5.0
Darington Hobson ^{[a]}	5	0	7.8	.154	.000		.6	1.2	.0	.0	.8
Ersan İlyasova	60	41	27.6	.492	.455	.781	8.8	1.2	.7	.7	13.0
Stephen Jackson ^{[a]}	26	13	27.4	.357	.278	.833	3.2	3.0	1.0	.2	10.5
Brandon Jennings	66	66	35.3	.418	.332	.808	3.4	5.5	1.6	.3	19.1
Jon Leuer	46	12	12.1	.508	.333	.750	2.6	.5	.3	.4	4.7
Shaun Livingston	58	27	18.8	.469	.667	.785	2.1	2.1	.5	.3	5.5
Luc Mbah a Moute	43	22	23.5	.510	.250	.641	5.3	.7	.9	.5	7.7
Larry Sanders	52	0	12.4	.457	.000	.474	3.1	.6	.6	1.5	3.6
Ekpe Udoh ^{[a]}	23	5	20.1	.409	.000	.800	4.7	1.1	.7	1.6	5.7
Beno Udrih	59	0	18.3	.440	.288	.709	1.7	3.8	.6	0.0	5.9

- ^{a} Statistics with the Milwaukee Bucks.

== Awards ==
- Ersan İlyasova was named Eastern Conference Player of the Week (March 5 – March 11).
- Drew Gooden was named Eastern Conference Player of the Week (March 12 – March 18).

== Injuries and disciplinary actions ==
- Center Kwame Brown, who had been traded to Milwaukee by the Golden State Warriors on January, underwent surgery to repair a torn pectoralis major muscle and missed the remainder of the regular season.
- Drew Gooden served a one-game suspension and missed the first home game of the season for Milwaukee after committing a flagrant foul in the first game of the regular season.
- Stephen Jackson was suspended for one game on two occasions. First by the team, after missing the bus to a morning shootaround before a game against the New York Knicks and then by the league for verbal abuse of an official and failure to leave the court in a timely manner after a game against the Chicago Bulls.
- Larry Sanders received a two game suspension after starting an altercation and failing to leave the court in a timely manner during a game against the Indiana Pacers.

== Transactions ==
=== Overview ===
Players Added

Via free agency

- Mike Dunleavy Jr.

Via trade

- Kwame Brown
- Monta Ellis
- Stephen Jackson
- Shaun Livingston
- Ekpe Udoh
- Beno Udrih
Players Lost

Via trade

- Andrew Bogut
- Keyon Dooling
- Stephen Jackson
- John Salmons

Via free agency

- Michael Redd
- Earl Boykins

Waived

- Darington Hobson

=== Trades ===
June 23, 2011	To Milwaukee Bucks Stephen Jackson; Shaun Livingston; Beno Udrih; Draft rights to Tobias Harris	To Charlotte Bobcats Corey Maggette; Draft rights to Bismack Biyombo To Sacramento Kings John Salmons; Draft rights to Jimmer Fredette
December 9, 2011	To Milwaukee Bucks Draft rights to Albert Miralles	To Boston Celtics Keyon Dooling; Conditional 2012 second-round pick
March 13, 2012	To Milwaukee Bucks Monta Ellis; Ekpe Udoh; Kwame Brown	To Golden State Warriors Andrew Bogut; Stephen Jackson

=== Free agents ===
Additions
Player	Date signed	Former team
Mike Dunleavy Jr.	December 10, 2011	Indiana Pacers

Subtractions
Player	Date signed	New team
Chris Douglas-Roberts	September 10, 2011	Virtus Bologna (Italy)
Michael Redd	December 29, 2011	Phoenix Suns
Earl Boykins	March 26, 2012	Houston Rockets

Many players signed with teams from other leagues due to the 2011 NBA lockout. FIBA allows players under NBA contracts to sign and play for teams from other leagues if the contracts have opt-out clauses that allow the players to return to the NBA if the lockout ends. The Chinese Basketball Association, however, only allows its clubs to sign foreign free agents who could play for at least the entire season.

Played in other leagues during lockout
Player	Date signed	New team	Opt-out clause
Ersan İlyasova	August 3	Anadolu Efes (Turkey)	Yes
Jon Leuer	August 5	Deutsche Bank Skyliners (Germany)	Yes
Chris Douglas-Roberts	September 10	Virtus Bologna (Italy)	No

== See also ==
2011–12 NBA season
