= 2010–11 Milwaukee Bucks season =

NBA professional basketball team season

- Head coach: Scott Skiles
- General manager: John Hammond
- Owners: Herb Kohl
- Arena: Bradley Center

Results
- Record: 35–47 (.427)
- Place: Division: 3rd (Central); Conference: 9th (Eastern)
- Playoff finish: Did not qualify
- Stats at Basketball Reference

Local media
- Television: Fox Sports Wisconsin
- Radio: WTMJ

The 2010–11 Milwaukee Bucks season was the 43rd season of the franchise in the National Basketball Association (NBA).

== Key dates ==
- June 24 – The 2010 NBA draft was held in New York City.
- July 1 – The free agency period begun.

== Roster ==
2010–11 Milwaukee Bucks roster
Players

Pos.	No.	Player	Height	Weight	DOB	From
C	6	Andrew Bogut	7 ft 0 in (2.13 m)	260 lb (118 kg)	1984–11–28	Utah
G	11	Earl Boykins	5 ft 5 in (1.65 m)	133 lb (60 kg)	1976–06–02	Eastern Michigan
F	40	Jon Brockman	6 ft 7 in (2.01 m)	255 lb (116 kg)	1987–03–20	Washington
G/F	10	Carlos Delfino	6 ft 6 in (1.98 m)	230 lb (104 kg)	1982–08–29	Argentina
G	55	Keyon Dooling	6 ft 3 in (1.91 m)	195 lb (88 kg)	1980–05–08	Missouri
G/F	17	Chris Douglas-Roberts	6 ft 7 in (2.01 m)	210 lb (95 kg)	1987–01–08	Memphis
F	0	Drew Gooden	6 ft 10 in (2.08 m)	250 lb (113 kg)	1981–09–24	Kansas
F	7	Ersan İlyasova	6 ft 10 in (2.08 m)	235 lb (107 kg)	1987–05–15	Turkey
G	3	Brandon Jennings	6 ft 1 in (1.85 m)	169 lb (77 kg)	1989–09–23	Oak Hill Academy (VA)
G/F	5	Corey Maggette	6 ft 6 in (1.98 m)	230 lb (104 kg)	1979–11–12	Duke
F	12	Luc Mbah a Moute	6 ft 8 in (2.03 m)	230 lb (104 kg)	1986–09–09	UCLA
G	22	Michael Redd	6 ft 6 in (1.98 m)	215 lb (98 kg)	1979–08–24	Ohio State
G/F	15	John Salmons	6 ft 6 in (1.98 m)	207 lb (94 kg)	1979–12–12	Miami (FL)
F/C	8	Larry Sanders	6 ft 11 in (2.11 m)	235 lb (107 kg)	1988–11–21	VCU

Coaches
Head coach
- Scott Skiles
Assistant(s)
- Scott Barthlama
- Jim Boylan
- Joe Wolf
- Adrian Griffin
- Kelvin Sampson
- Bill Peterson
- Anthony Goldwire

Legend
- (DP) Unsigned draft pick
- (FA) Free agent
- (S) Suspended
- Injured

== Pre-season ==
=== Game log ===
2010 pre-season game log
Pre-season: 3–5 (home: 2–1; road: 1–4)

Game	Date	Team	Score	High points	High rebounds	High assists	Location Attendance	Record
1	October 5	Chicago	W 92–83	Earl Boykins (14)	Jon Brockman (8)	Brandon Jennings (5)	Bradley Center; 10,964	1–0
2	October 8	@ Detroit	L 110–115 (OT)	Brandon Jennings, Ersan İlyasova, Chris Douglas-Roberts (18)	Larry Sanders (9)	Earl Boykins (7)	The Palace of Auburn Hills; 12,821	1–1
3	October 9	Charlotte	W 86–78	Brandon Jennings (18)	Drew Gooden (9)	Earl Boykins (4)	Resch Center; 5,467	2–1
4	October 14	@ Washington	W 96–88	Drew Gooden (25)	Ersan İlyasova (8)	Brandon Jennings (7)	Verizon Center; 9,263	3–1
5	October 16	@ Memphis	L 77–91	Drew Gooden (13)	Brian Skinner (8)	Carlos Delfino (4)	FedExForum; 9,767	3–2
6	October 17	@ Minnesota	L 109–114	Ersan İlyasova (22)	Brian Skinner (8)	Brandon Jennings, Ersan İlyasova (4)	Sioux Falls Arena; 5,102	3–3
7	October 21	@ Cleveland	L 77–83	Chris Douglas-Roberts (16)	Ersan İlyasova (8)	Brandon Jennings (7)	Value City Arena; 7,092	3–4
8	October 22	Minnesota	L 118–119	Carlos Delfino (18)	Carlos Delfino, Chris Douglas-Roberts, Ersan İlyasova, Larry Sanders (8)	Carlos Delfino (8)	Bradley Center; 11,624	3–5

2010–11 season schedule

== Regular season ==
=== Standings ===
Central Division	W	L	PCT	GB	Home	Road	Div
z-Chicago Bulls	62	20	.756	–	36–5	26–15	15–1
x-Indiana Pacers	37	45	.451	25	24–17	13–28	9–7
Milwaukee Bucks	35	47	.427	27	22–19	13–28	6–10
Detroit Pistons	30	52	.366	32	21–20	9–32	7–9
Cleveland Cavaliers	19	63	.232	43	12–29	7–34	3–13

#	Eastern Conference				
#	Team	W	L	PCT	GB
1	z-Chicago Bulls	62	20	.756	–
2	y-Miami Heat	58	24	.707	4
3	y-Boston Celtics	56	26	.683	6
4	x-Orlando Magic	52	30	.634	10
5	x-Atlanta Hawks	44	38	.537	18
6	x-New York Knicks	42	40	.512	20
7	x-Philadelphia 76ers	41	41	.500	21
8	x-Indiana Pacers	37	45	.451	25
9	Milwaukee Bucks	35	47	.427	27
10	Charlotte Bobcats	34	48	.415	28
11	Detroit Pistons	30	52	.366	32
12	New Jersey Nets	24	58	.293	38
13	Washington Wizards	23	59	.280	39
14	Toronto Raptors	22	60	.268	40
15	Cleveland Cavaliers	19	63	.232	43

=== Game log ===
2010–11 game log
Total: 35–47 (Home: 22–19; Road: 13–28)
October: 1–2 (home: 1–0; road: 0–2)

Game	Date	Team	Score	High points	High rebounds	High assists	Location Attendance	Record
1	October 27	@ New Orleans	L 91–95	Carlos Delfino (19)	Andrew Bogut (15)	Brandon Jennings (10)	New Orleans Arena; 15,039	0–1
2	October 29	@ Minnesota	L 85–96	Corey Maggette (23)	Andrew Bogut (10)	Brandon Jennings (7)	Target Center; 17,197	0–2
3	October 30	Charlotte	W 98–88	Carlos Delfino (23)	Brandon Jennings (10)	Brandon Jennings (10)	Bradley Center; 16,519	1–2

November: 5–9 (home: 3–4; road: 2–5)

Game	Date	Team	Score	High points	High rebounds	High assists	Location Attendance	Record
4	November 2	Portland	L 76–90	Corey Maggette (16)	Andrew Bogut (9)	Brandon Jennings (7)	Bradley Center; 13,087	1–3
5	November 3	@ Boston	L 102–105 (OT)	Andrew Bogut (21)	Andrew Bogut (13)	Carlos Delfino (7)	TD Garden; 18,624	1–4
6	November 5	@ Indiana	W 94–90	John Salmons (22)	Luc Mbah a Moute (15)	John Salmons (5)	Conseco Fieldhouse; 14,115	2–4
7	November 6	New Orleans	L 81–87	Andrew Bogut (19)	Andrew Bogut (14)	Brandon Jennings (5)	Bradley Center; 16,731	2–5
8	November 9	New York	W 107–80	Brandon Jennings (19)	Ersan İlyasova (9)	Brandon Jennings (6)	Bradley Center; 13,286	3–5
9	November 10	@ Atlanta	W 108–91	Corey Maggette (20)	Drew Gooden, Ersan İlyasova (10)	Earl Boykins (8)	Philips Arena; 11,211	4–5
10	November 13	Golden State	W 79–72	John Salmons (26)	Andrew Bogut (17)	Brandon Jennings (6)	Bradley Center; 17,049	5–5
11	November 16	L.A. Lakers	L 107–118	Brandon Jennings (31)	Andrew Bogut (18)	Brandon Jennings, John Salmons (6)	Bradley Center; 18,059	5–6
12	November 19	@ Philadelphia	L 79–90	Corey Maggette (20)	Drew Gooden, John Salmons (8)	Earl Boykins, Brandon Jennings, John Salmons (4)	Wells Fargo Center; 14,557	5–7
13	November 20	Oklahoma City	L 81–82	Brandon Jennings (25)	Drew Gooden (16)	Brandon Jennings (3)	Bradley Center; 16,975	5–8
14	November 24	@ Cleveland	L 81–83	Keyon Dooling (18)	Drew Gooden, Luc Mbah a Moute (9)	Keyon Dooling (5)	Quicken Loans Arena; 20,562	5–9
15	November 26	@ Detroit	L 89–103	Brandon Jennings (25)	Ersan İlyasova (11)	Brandon Jennings (6)	The Palace of Auburn Hills; 17,133	5–10
16	November 27	Charlotte	W 104–101	Brandon Jennings (32)	Luc Mbah a Moute (10)	Brandon Jennings, John Salmons (7)	Bradley Center; 15,213	6–10
17	November 29	@ Utah	L 88–109	Brandon Jennings (27)	Ersan İlyasova (6)	Keyon Dooling, Brandon Jennings, John Salmons (4)	EnergySolutions Arena; 18,497	6–11

December: 6–7 (home: 3–3; road: 3–4)

Game	Date	Team	Score	High points	High rebounds	High assists	Location Attendance	Record
18	December 1	@ Denver	L 94–105	John Salmons (21)	Larry Sanders (10)	Chris Douglas-Roberts, Ersan İlyasova, Brandon Jennings, Corey Maggette (4)	Pepsi Center; 14,221	6–12
19	December 4	Orlando	W 96–85	Andrew Bogut (31)	Andrew Bogut (18)	Brandon Jennings (6)	Bradley Center; 16,218	7–12
20	December 6	Miami	L 78–88	Corey Maggette (20)	Andrew Bogut (13)	John Salmons (4)	Bradley Center; 17,167	7–13
21	December 8	Indiana	W 97–95	Brandon Jennings (22)	Andrew Bogut (11)	Brandon Jennings, John Salmons (4)	Bradley Center; 12,789	8–13
22	December 10	Houston	W 97–91	Andrew Bogut (24)	Andrew Bogut (22)	John Salmons (5)	Bradley Center; 14,526	9–13
23	December 13	@ Dallas	W 103–99	Brandon Jennings (23)	Andrew Bogut (14)	Brandon Jennings (10)	American Airlines Center; 19,720	10–13
24	December 15	@ San Antonio	L 90–92	Chris Douglas-Roberts (21)	Drew Gooden (11)	Brandon Jennings (7)	AT&T Center; 12,514	10–14
25	December 18	Utah	L 86–95	Andrew Bogut (19)	Andrew Bogut (9)	Keyon Dooling (5)	Bradley Center; 16,004	10–15
26	December 20	@ Portland	L 80–106	John Salmons (23)	Luc Mbah a Moute (7)	Keyon Dooling (5)	Rose Garden; 20,406	10–16
27	December 21	@ L.A. Lakers	W 98–79	Earl Boykins (22)	Ersan İlyasova (11)	John Salmons (6)	Staples Center; 18,997	11–16
28	December 23	@ Sacramento	W 84–79	Earl Boykins (19)	Andrew Bogut (13)	John Salmons (6)	ARCO Arena; 12,360	12–16
29	December 27	Atlanta	L 80–95	John Salmons (18)	Andrew Bogut (11)	Keyon Dooling (9)	Bradley Center; 16,751	12–17
30	December 28	@ Chicago	L 77–90	John Salmons (18)	Andrew Bogut (16)	Keyon Dooling (6)	United Center; 22,091	12–18

January: 7–9 (home: 4–3; road: 3–6)

Game	Date	Team	Score	High points	High rebounds	High assists	Location Attendance	Record
31	January 1	Dallas	W 99–87	Earl Boykins (26)	Ersan İlyasova (17)	Earl Boykins (6)	Bradley Center; 13,194	13–18
32	January 4	@ Miami	L 89–101	John Salmons (18)	Andrew Bogut (8)	John Salmons (6)	American Airlines Arena; 20,215	13–19
33	January 5	@ Orlando	L 87–97	Corey Maggette (21)	Larry Sanders (8)	Andrew Bogut, Earl Boykins, Keyon Dooling (2)	Amway Center; 18,846	13–20
34	January 7	Miami	L 95–101 (OT)	Chris Douglas-Roberts (30)	Andrew Bogut (27)	Keyon Dooling (7)	Bradley Center; 18,717	13–21
35	January 8	@ New Jersey	W 115–92	Chris Douglas-Roberts (24)	Ersan İlyasova (13)	Keyon Dooling (7)	Prudential Center; 12,898	14–21
36	January 12	San Antonio	L 84–91	John Salmons (17)	Andrew Bogut (14)	Keyon Dooling (6)	Bradley Center; 14,061	14–22
37	January 14	@ Philadelphia	L 94–95	Corey Maggette (16)	Andrew Bogut (12)	Earl Boykins (11)	Wells Fargo Center; 12,650	14–23
38	January 17	@ Houston	L 84–93	Corey Maggette (25)	Drew Gooden (11)	Earl Boykins (6)	Toyota Center; 16,186	14–24
39	January 19	Washington	W 100–87	Keyon Dooling (23)	Andrew Bogut, Ersan İlyasova (9)	Earl Boykins, Corey Maggette (4)	Bradley Center; 14,007	15–24
40	January 21	@ Cleveland	W 102–88	Andrew Bogut (23)	Luc Mbah a Moute (9)	Keyon Dooling (11)	Quicken Loans Arena; 20,562	16–24
41	January 22	Memphis	L 81–94	Earl Boykins (23)	Andrew Bogut (9)	Corey Maggette (5)	Bradley Center; 16,157	16–25
42	January 24	@ Chicago	L 83–92	Chris Douglas-Roberts (30)	Andrew Bogut (18)	Keyon Dooling (10)	United Center; 21,126	16–26
43	January 26	Atlanta	W 98–90	Corey Maggette (22)	Andrew Bogut (14)	Keyon Dooling (5)	Bradley Center; 13,274	17–26
44	January 28	@ Toronto	W 116–110 (OT)	Corey Maggette (29)	Corey Maggette (11)	Carlos Delfino (6)	Air Canada Centre; 15,159	18–26
45	January 29	New Jersey	W 91–81	Carlos Delfino (21)	Andrew Bogut (18)	Keyon Dooling (9)	Bradley Center; 17,173	19–26
46	January 31	@ L.A. Clippers	L 98–105	Corey Maggette (25)	Andrew Bogut (11)	Keyon Dooling (8)	Staples Center; 17,218	19–27

February: 3–9 (home: 3–4; road: 0–5)

Game	Date	Team	Score	High points	High rebounds	High assists	Location Attendance	Record
47	February 2	@ Phoenix	L 77–92	Ersan İlyasova, Corey Maggette (15)	Ersan İlyasova (9)	Brandon Jennings (5)	US Airways Center; 16,422	19–28
48	February 3	@ Golden State	L 94–100	Ersan İlyasova (23)	Luc Mbah a Moute (19)	Keyon Dooling (9)	Oracle Arena; 18,008	19–29
49	February 5	Detroit	L 78–89	Andrew Bogut (18)	Andrew Bogut, Ersan İlyasova (9)	Brandon Jennings (5)	Bradley Center; 15,791	19–30
50	February 8	Toronto	W 92–74	John Salmons (17)	Luc Mbah a Moute (14)	Keyon Dooling (5)	Bradley Center; 11,975	20–30
51	February 9	@ Washington	L 85–100	Brandon Jennings (20)	Andrew Bogut (11)	Andrew Bogut, Brandon Jennings, Keyon Dooling (4)	Verizon Center; 16,108	20–31
52	February 11	@ Memphis	L 86–89	Corey Maggette (22)	Andrew Bogut (14)	John Salmons (6)	FedExForum; 14,749	20–32
53	February 12	Indiana	L 97–103	Carlos Delfino (21)	Andrew Bogut (12)	Carlos Delfino (5)	Bradley Center; 17,046	20–33
54	February 14	L.A. Clippers	W 102–78	Carlos Delfino (26)	Luc Mbah a Moute (10)	John Salmons (12)	Bradley Center; 13,111	21–33
55	February 16	Denver	L 87–94	John Salmons (33)	Andrew Bogut (20)	Earl Boykins (5)	Bradley Center; 16,033	21–34
All-Star Break
56	February 22	Minnesota	W 94–88	Brandon Jennings (27)	Jon Brockman (14)	Brandon Jennings (7)	Bradley Center; 13,106	22–34
57	February 23	@ New York	L 108–114	John Salmons (27)	Andrew Bogut (12)	John Salmons (7)	Madison Square Garden; 19,763	22–35
58	February 26	Chicago	L 75–83	Luc Mbah a Moute (16)	Andrew Bogut (16)	Andrew Bogut, Carlos Delfino, Brandon Jennings, Corey Maggette (2)	Bradley Center; 18,717	22–36

March: 8–8 (home: 5–5; road: 3–3)

Game	Date	Team	Score	High points	High rebounds	High assists	Location Attendance	Record
59	March 1	Detroit	W 92–90	Brandon Jennings (21)	Carlos Delfino (10)	Carlos Delfino, Brandon Jennings (4)	Bradley Center; 11,364	23–36
60	March 4	Phoenix	L 88–102	Corey Maggette (21)	Carlos Delfino, Corey Maggette (9)	Earl Boykins, Carlos Delfino, John Salmons (3)	Bradley Center; 15,011	23–37
61	March 6	Boston	L 83–89	Brandon Jennings (23)	Jon Brockman (9)	John Salmons (6)	Bradley Center; 16,110	23–38
62	March 8	@ Washington	W 95–76	Brandon Jennings (23)	Andrew Bogut (9)	Andrew Bogut (7)	Verizon Center; 16,190	24–38
63	March 9	Cleveland	W 110–90	Earl Boykins, Brandon Jennings (18)	Andrew Bogut (10)	Keyon Dooling (5)	Bradley Center; 12,497	25–38
64	March 12	Philadelphia	W 102–74	Andrew Bogut (17)	Luc Mbah a Moute (12)	Earl Boykins, John Salmons (7)	Bradley Center; 15,832	26–38
65	March 13	@ Boston	L 56–87	Earl Barron (10)	Andrew Bogut (8)	Brandon Jennings (3)	TD Garden; 18,624	26–39
66	March 15	@ Atlanta	L 85–110	Andrew Bogut (21)	Andrew Bogut (13)	Earl Barron, John Salmons (4)	Philips Arena; 13,590	26–40
67	March 16	Orlando	L 89–93 (OT)	Brandon Jennings (23)	Jon Brockman (8)	Brandon Jennings (8)	Bradley Center; 13,831	26–41
68	March 18	New Jersey	W 110–95	Carlos Delfino (26)	Carlos Delfino (8)	Brandon Jennings (10)	Bradley Center; 14,563	27–41
69	March 20	New York	W 100–95	Carlos Delfino (30)	Andrew Bogut (12)	Brandon Jennings (9)	Bradley Center; 18,052	28–41
70	March 23	Sacramento	L 90–97	Carlos Delfino (30)	Andrew Bogut (9)	Brandon Jennings (6)	Bradley Center; 14,122	28–42
71	March 25	@ New York	W 102–96	Brandon Jennings (37)	Andrew Bogut (17)	John Salmons (5)	Madison Square Garden; 19,763	29–42
72	March 26	Chicago	L 87–95	John Salmons (25)	Andrew Bogut (9)	Brandon Jennings (5)	Bradley Center; 18,717	29–43
73	March 28	@ Charlotte	L 86–87	Andrew Bogut, Brandon Jennings (26)	Andrew Bogut, Brandon Jennings (9)	John Salmons (6)	Time Warner Cable Arena; 12,368	29–44
74	March 30	@ Toronto	W 104–98	Brandon Jennings (25)	Drew Gooden (11)	Brandon Jennings, John Salmons (7)	Air Canada Centre; 15,906	30–44

April: 5–3 (home: 3–0; road: 2–3)

Game	Date	Team	Score	High points	High rebounds	High assists	Location Attendance	Record
75	April 1	@ Indiana	L 88–89	Brandon Jennings (20)	Drew Gooden (10)	Keyon Dooling (4)	Conseco Fieldhouse; 11,177	30–45
76	April 2	Philadelphia	W 93–87	John Salmons (19)	Drew Gooden (12)	John Salmons (8)	Bradley Center; 17,079	31–45
77	April 5	@ Orlando	L 72–78	Drew Gooden (18)	John Salmons (8)	Drew Gooden (4)	Amway Center; 18,996	31–46
78	April 6	@ Miami	W 90–85	John Salmons (17)	Luc Mbah a Moute (12)	Andrew Bogut, Brandon Jennings (4)	American Airlines Arena; 20,017	32–46
79	April 8	@ Detroit	L 100–110	Brandon Jennings (31)	Jon Brockman, Ersan İlyasova (6)	Brandon Jennings (4)	The Palace of Auburn Hills; 16,266	32–47
80	April 9	Cleveland	W 108–101	John Salmons (32)	Drew Gooden (13)	Drew Gooden (13)	Bradley Center; 18,717	33–47
81	April 11	Toronto	W 93–86	John Salmons (24)	Drew Gooden (11)	Drew Gooden (5)	Bradley Center; 13,279	34–47
82	April 13	@ Oklahoma City	W 110–106 (OT)	Brandon Jennings (16)	Ersan İlyasova (9)	Brandon Jennings (7)	Oklahoma City Arena; 18,203	35–47

2010–11 season schedule

== Player statistics ==
Legend
GP	Games played	GS	Games started	MPG	Minutes per game
FG%	Field-goal percentage	3P%	3-point field-goal percentage	FT%	Free-throw percentage
RPG	Rebounds per game	APG	Assists per game	SPG	Steals per game
BPG	Blocks per game	PPG	Points per game

=== Season ===
Milwaukee Bucks statistics
Player	GP	GS	MPG	FG%	3P%	FT%	RPG	APG	SPG	BPG	PPG
Andrew Bogut	65	65	34.4	.495	.000	.442	11.1	2.00	0.72	2.63	12.8
Earl Boykins	57	0	15.1	.443	.380	.841	1.00	2.5	.67	.05	7.2
Jon Brockman	63	6	10.7	.511	.0	.678	2.90	0.3	.22	.5	2.2
Carlos Delfino	49	40	32.4	.390	.370	.800	4.1	2.3	1.55	.16	11.5
Keyon Dooling	80	22	22.0	.397	.346	.830	1.50	3.0	.68	.05	7.1
Chris Douglas-Roberts	44	12	20.1	.429	.326	.831	2.0	1.1	.66	.30	7.3
Drew Gooden	35	18	24.6	.431	.150	.794	6.8	1.3	.60	.51	11.3
Ersan İlyasova	60	34	25.1	.436	.298	.894	6.1	0.9	.85	.40	9.5
Brandon Jennings	63	61	34.4	.390	.323	.809	3.7	4.8	1.51	.33	16.2
Corey Maggette	67	18	20.9	.453	.359	.834	3.6	1.3	.31	.07	12.0
Luc Mbah a Moute	79	52	26.5	.463	.000	.707	5.30	0.9	.91	.35	6.7
Michael Redd	10	0	13.4	.400	.235	1.0	0.80	1.2	.2	.1	4.4
John Salmons	73	70	35.3	.415	.379	.813	3.60	0.99	1.00	.31	13.3
Larry Sanders	60	12	14.5	.433	.0	.560	3.0	0.3	.37	1.20	4.3
Brian Skinner	2	0	3.0	.0	.0	.0	0.0	0.0	.0	.0	0.0

As of June 17, 2011.

=== Playoffs ===
The Bucks failed to qualify for the playoffs, despite qualifying the previous year.

== Injuries and surgeries ==
Michael Redd suffered a torn ACL and MCL the previous season in a January 10 game against the Los Angeles Lakers. He is expected to be out until at least February.

Chris Douglas-Roberts missed the first fifteen games of the season after suffering a pre-season eye injury that required surgery. He has worn protective glasses since returning on November 27.

Carlos Delfino has been out indefinitely since the Bucks' November 6 loss to the New Orleans Hornets. He suffered a neck sprain and has been experiencing concussive symptoms.

Andrew Bogut missed five games due to back spasms. He made his return in a December 4 victory over the Orlando Magic.

Drew Gooden missed five games after suffering from plantar fasciitis in his left foot. He returned for the Bucks' December 13 victory over the Dallas Mavericks.

Corey Maggette is expected to be out until early January. A fall in the Bucks' December 18 loss to the Utah Jazz left him with concussive symptoms.

Brandon Jennings underwent surgery on December 20 to repair a fracture in his left foot. He is expected to miss four-to-six weeks.

== Transactions ==
=== Trades ===
June 22, 2010
To Milwaukee Bucks----
- (United States) Corey Maggette,
  No. 44 pick (Jerome Jordan)
To Golden State Warriors----
- (United States) Charlie Bell,
  (Netherlands) Dan Gadzuric
June 24, 2010
To New Jersey Nets----
- 2012 second-round pick
To Milwaukee Bucks----
- (United States) Chris Douglas-Roberts
July 8, 2010
To Milwaukee Bucks----
- Cash considerations
To New York Knicks----
- No. 44 pick (Jerome Jordan)
July 21, 2010
To Milwaukee Bucks----
- (United States) Jon Brockman
To Sacramento Kings----
- (United States) Darnell Jackson
  2011 second-round pick

=== Free agents ===
==== Additions ====
Player	Signed	Former Team
John Salmons	Signed 5-year contract for $39 million	Milwaukee Bucks
Drew Gooden	July 8, 2010 Signed 5-year contract for $32 million	Los Angeles Clippers
Keyon Dooling	July 19, 2010 Signed 2-year contract for $4.2 million	New Jersey Nets
Earl Boykins	August 19, 2010 Undisclosed	Washington Wizards
Garrett Temple	Signed 10-day contract	Erie BayHawks
Earl Barron	Signed 10-day contract	Phoenix Suns

==== Subtractions ====
Player	Reason left	New team
Luke Ridnour	Free agent	Minnesota Timberwolves
Royal Ivey	Free agent	Oklahoma City Thunder
Kurt Thomas	Free agent	Chicago Bulls
Jerry Stackhouse	Free agent	Miami Heat
