= Luc Mbah a Moute =

Cameroonian basketball player (born 1986)

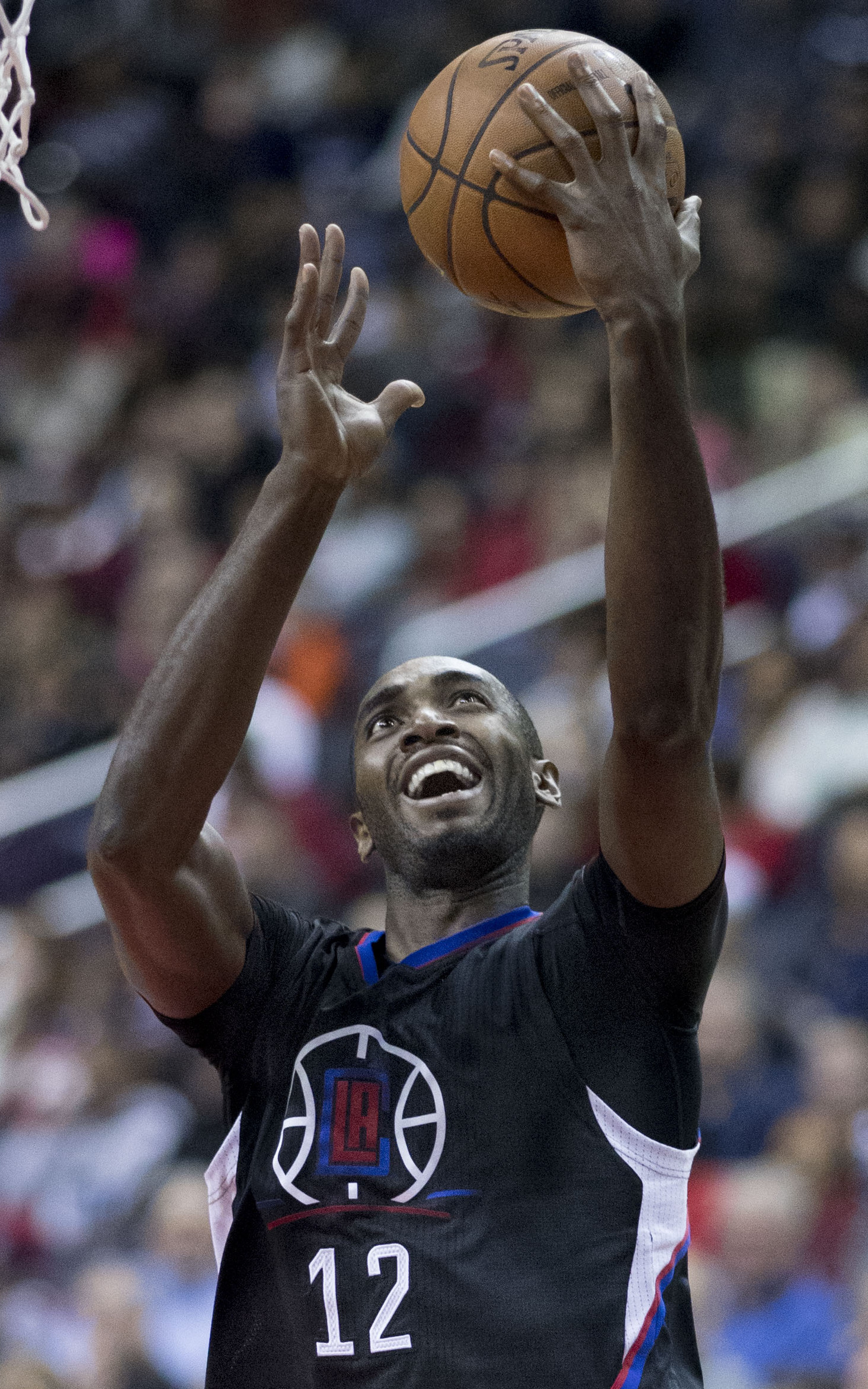
- Mbah a Moute with the Los Angeles Clippers in 2016

Personal information
- Born: 9 September 1986 (age 40) Yaoundé, Cameroon
- Listed height: 6 ft 8 in (2.03 m)
- Listed weight: 230 lb (104 kg)

Career information
- High school: Montverde Academy (Montverde, Florida, U.S.)
- College: UCLA (2005–2008)
- NBA draft: 2008: 2nd round, 37th overall pick
- Drafted by: Milwaukee Bucks
- Playing career: 2008–2020
- Position: Power forward / small forward
- Number: 12, 33

Career history
- 2008–2013: Milwaukee Bucks
- 2013: Sacramento Kings
- 2013–2014: Minnesota Timberwolves
- 2014–2015: Philadelphia 76ers
- 2015–2017: Los Angeles Clippers
- 2017–2018: Houston Rockets
- 2018–2019: Los Angeles Clippers
- 2020: Houston Rockets

Career highlights
- Pac-10 Freshman of the Year (2006); Pac-10 All-Freshman Team (2006)
- Stats at NBA.com
- Stats at Basketball Reference
Medals
Men's basketball
Representing Cameroon
African Championships
Silver medal – second place	2007 Angola	National team

Luc Richard Mbah a Moute (/ˌbɑː ɑː ˈmuːteɪ/ BAH ah MOO-tay; born 9 September 1986) is a Cameroonian former professional basketball player who played for 13 seasons in the National Basketball Association (NBA). He played college basketball for the UCLA Bruins. Mbah a Moute also played for the Cameroon national team.

Mbah a Moute is currently a player agent for Creative Artists Agency (CAA).

== College career ==
Mbah a Moute attended Montverde Academy in Florida from 2001 to 2005, where he was coached by Kevin Sutton. Soon, he would be Westwood-bound to play for coach Ben Howland at the University of California, Los Angeles.

As a freshman in 2005–06, Mbah a Moute led the Pac-10 Conference–champion Bruins in rebounding. He led or tied for the lead for the Bruins in rebounding in 27 regular-season games. In the NCAA tournament, Mbah a Moute scored the winning layup at the end of a comeback win over Gonzaga in the Sweet 16. Mbah a Moute also posted 17 points, 9 rebounds, 2 steals, and 1 assist in a Final Four victory over LSU. For the year, Mbah a Moute averaged 8.9 points and 8.1 rebounds, and he was named Pac-10 Freshman of the Year.

Mbah was popular among the UCLA faithful. Along with fellow Cameroonian Alfred Aboya, the dynamic duo created the "Cameroon Crazies" (a take-off of Duke's "Cameron Crazies" fans) section, along with a popular T-shirt which read "Moute Kicks Boute". Mbah a Moute himself became known as The Fresh Prince of Africa, after the television show of the same name.

His mother, Goufane a Ziem Agnes Bertine, and his father, Camille Moute à Bidias, had never seen him play for UCLA until they came from Cameroon to attend the Final Four of the 2008 NCAA Men's Division I Basketball Tournament. During the 2008 season, his team had a record of 35–4 and won their third straight Pac-10 title, and made their third straight NCAA Final Four.

Mbah a Moute ended his UCLA career with an honorable mention All-Pac-10, honorable mention Pac-10 All-Defensive Team selection and a fifth-place finish in scoring (8.8 ppg). He is ranked the No. 15 rebounder with a total of 775 rebounds.

Mbah a Moute became the first player to start in three straight Final Fours at UCLA in 34 years. Bill Walton, Jamaal Wilkes, and Greg Lee (1972–74) were the last players at UCLA, and Andre Hutson and Charlie Bell of Michigan State (1999–2001) were the last to do so.

== Professional career ==
=== Milwaukee Bucks (2008–2013) ===
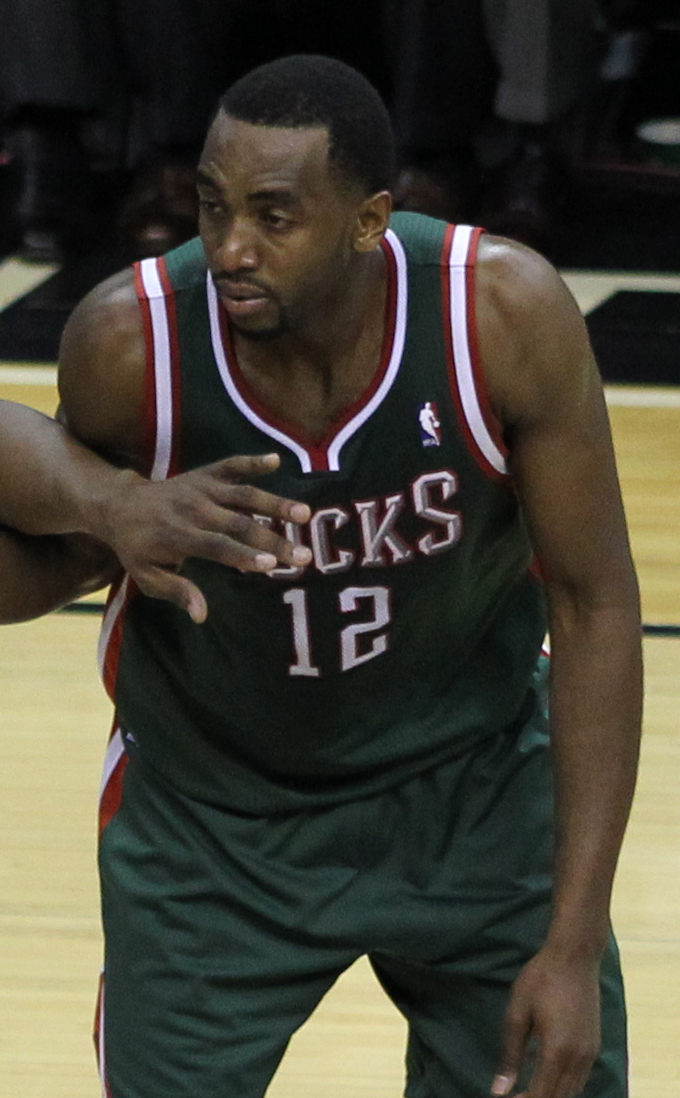
Mbah a Moute with the Bucks in 2011

Mbah a Moute gave up his final year of college eligibility at UCLA to enter the 2008 NBA draft, in which he was selected by the Milwaukee Bucks with the 37th overall pick. Mbah a Moute got off to a quick start with the Bucks and quickly became a fan favorite. His strong play, especially on defense, led to him overtaking Charlie Villanueva as the Bucks' starting power forward only nine games into the season. In his second game as a starter, Mbah a Moute posted career highs of 19 points and 17 rebounds in a 101–96 victory over the Memphis Grizzlies. Bucks head coach Scott Skiles and general manager John Hammond both praised Mbah a Moute's defensive skills.

After the 2010–11 season, Mbah a Moute became a restricted free agent. On 10 December 2011, he received a four-year, $18.7 million offer sheet from the Denver Nuggets. Three days later, the Bucks matched the offer sheet, re-signing Mbah a Moute.

=== Sacramento Kings (2013) ===
On 12 July 2013, Mbah a Moute was traded to the Sacramento Kings.

=== Minnesota Timberwolves (2013–2014) ===
On 26 November 2013, Mbah a Moute was traded to the Minnesota Timberwolves for Derrick Williams.

=== Philadelphia 76ers (2014–2015) ===
On 23 August 2014, a three-team trade was completed, involving the Timberwolves, the Cleveland Cavaliers, and the Philadelphia 76ers. As part of the deal, Mbah a Moute and teammate Alexey Shved were traded to the Sixers, along with a 2015 first-round draft pick from Cleveland. The Cavaliers received Kevin Love from Minnesota, whereas the Wolves received Andrew Wiggins and Anthony Bennett from Cleveland and Thaddeus Young from Philadelphia. It united him with Joel Embiid, a fellow Cameroonian he had invited to his Basketball Without Borders camp in 2011 and who had been selected by the 76ers with their 2014 first round pick.

On 14 July 2015, Mbah a Moute signed with the Sacramento Kings once again. However, two days later, his contract was voided by the Kings after he failed his physical examination. Mbah a Moute felt he was mistreated by the Kings and filed grievance against the team. He later passed a medical test in order to compete for Team Africa at the 2015 NBA Africa exhibition game on 1 August.

=== Los Angeles Clippers (2015–2017) ===
On 25 September 2015, Mbah a Moute signed with the Los Angeles Clippers. Midway through the 2015–16 season, the Clippers placed Mbah a Moute in the starting lineup.

On 8 July 2016, Mbah a Moute re-signed with the Clippers. On 21 April 2017, in Game 3 of the Clippers' first-round playoff series against the Utah Jazz, Mbah a Moute scored a career playoff-high 15 points to help the Clippers win 111–106, taking a 2–1 lead in the series. The Clippers went on to lose the series to the Jazz in seven games.

=== Houston Rockets (2017–2018) ===
On 19 July 2017, Mbah a Moute signed with the Houston Rockets. On 22 November 2017, in a 125–95 win against the Denver Nuggets, Mbah a Moute finished with a plus–minus of +57, the highest in an NBA game in 20 years. He was a perfect 5-of-5 shooting for 13 points in 26 minutes, during which the Rockets outscored the Nuggets 93–36. On 14 December 2017, he was ruled out for two to three weeks with a shoulder injury. Mbah a Moute dislocated his shoulder for a second time on 10 April 2018, in a 105–99 win over the Los Angeles Lakers. He subsequently missed the first round of the playoffs.

=== Return to the Clippers (2018–2019) ===
On 19 July 2018, Mbah a Moute signed with the Los Angeles Clippers, returning to the franchise for a second stint. He appeared in just four games for the Clippers in 2018–19 after injuring his left knee in a game against the New Orleans Pelicans on 23 October 2018. He initially underwent various non-surgical treatment options before ultimately undergoing a partial medial meniscectomy on his left knee, with medial femoral condyle chondroplasty, on 28 March 2019. He was subsequently waived by the Clippers on 7 April.

=== Return to the Rockets (2020) ===
On July 7, 2020, the Houston Rockets announced that they had signed Mbah a Moute.

== Career statistics ==
=== NBA statistics ===
Legend
GP	Games played	GS	Games started	MPG	Minutes per game
FG%	Field goal percentage	3P%	3-point field goal percentage	FT%	Free throw percentage
RPG	Rebounds per game	APG	Assists per game	SPG	Steals per game
BPG	Blocks per game	PPG	Points per game	**Bold**	Career high
*	Led the league

==== Regular season ====
Year	Team	GP	GS	MPG	FG%	3P%	FT%	RPG	APG	SPG	BPG	PPG
2008–09	Milwaukee	**82***	51	25.8	.462	.000	**.729**	**5.9**	1.1	1.1	.5	7.2
2009–10	Milwaukee	73	62	25.6	.480	.353	.699	5.5	1.1	.8	.5	6.2
2010–11	Milwaukee	79	52	26.5	.463	.000	.707	5.3	.9	.9	.4	6.7
2011–12	Milwaukee	43	22	23.5	**.510**	.250	.641	5.3	.7	.9	.5	7.7
2012–13	Milwaukee	58	45	22.9	.401	.351	.571	4.4	.9	.7	.2	6.7
2013–14	Sacramento	9	5	21.8	.469	.333	.692	3.0	**1.7**	1.0	**.6**	4.4
2013–14	Minnesota	55	2	14.7	.447	.214	.685	2.2	.4	.4	.2	3.3
2014–15	Philadelphia	67	61	**28.6**	.395	.307	.589	4.9	1.6	**1.2**	.3	**9.9**
2015–16	L.A. Clippers	75	61	17.0	.454	.325	.526	2.3	.4	.6	.3	3.1
2016–17	L.A. Clippers	80	**76**	22.3	.505	**.391**	.678	2.2	.5	1.0	.4	6.1
2017–18	Houston	61	15	25.6	.481	.364	.684	3.0	.9	**1.2**	.4	7.5
2018–19	L.A. Clippers	4	0	15.3	.444	.333	.400	1.8	.5	.3	.3	5.0
2019–20	Houston	3	0	8.3	.400	.000	.500	.7	-	.6	-	1.7
Career		689	453	23.3	.454	.334	.659	4.1	.9	.9	.4	6.4

==== Playoffs ====
Year	Team	GP	GS	MPG	FG%	3P%	FT%	RPG	APG	SPG	BPG	PPG
2010	Milwaukee	7	**7**	25.4	.520	.000	.600	**5.6**	.7	.3	.0	**9.1**
2013	Milwaukee	4	4	**34.0**	.435	.000	.722	3.5	**1.8**	1.0	.0	8.3
2016	L.A. Clippers	5	5	15.6	**.667**	-	**1.000**	2.0	.2	.6	.0	1.8
2017	L.A. Clippers	7	**7**	32.0	.395	**.313**	.700	5.0	1.0	**1.1**	**.6**	7.6
2018	Houston	**9**	0	16.6	.250	.200	.571	2.4	.3	.7	.4	2.8
Career		32	23	23.9	.418	.216	.667	3.8	.7	.7	.3	5.8

=== College statistics ===
Year	Team	GP	GS	MPG	FG%	3P%	FT%	RPG	APG	SPG	BPG	PPG
2005–06	UCLA	39	38	29.5	.538	.132	.723	8.2	1.3	1.1	.6	9.1
2006–07	UCLA	35	35	29.9	.492	.222	.570	7.4	1.9	1.7	.8	8.2
2007–08	UCLA	33	32	29.0	.478	.200	.689	6.0	1.5	1.0	.5	8.8
Career		107	106	29.5	.503	.215	.668	7.2	1.6	1.3	.6	8.7

== Personal life ==
Mbah a Moute is a prince in the village of Bia Messe in the district of Bafia (near Yaoundé), as he is a son of the elected village chief, Camille Mouté à Bidias. His father is a high-ranking government official, managing the National Employment Fund of Cameroon, a training and job-placement national agency. Mbah a Moute is the twin brother of Emmanuel Bidias a Moute, who played basketball for Texas State University. His younger brother, Roger Moute a Bidias, was a basketball player for the California Golden Bears. Luc Mbah a Moute married Aurelie Van Assche on 15 February 2020, in Yaoundé, their hometown.

Mbah a Moute helped discover Cameroonian center Joel Embiid, the third overall pick in the 2014 NBA draft and eventual teammate on the Philadelphia 76ers. He also helped discover another Cameroonian player, power forward Pascal Siakam, the 27th pick in the 2016 NBA draft. and NBA G-League 2017-18 Defensive Player of the Year Landry Nnoko.
