= Brandon Jennings =

American basketball player (born 1989)

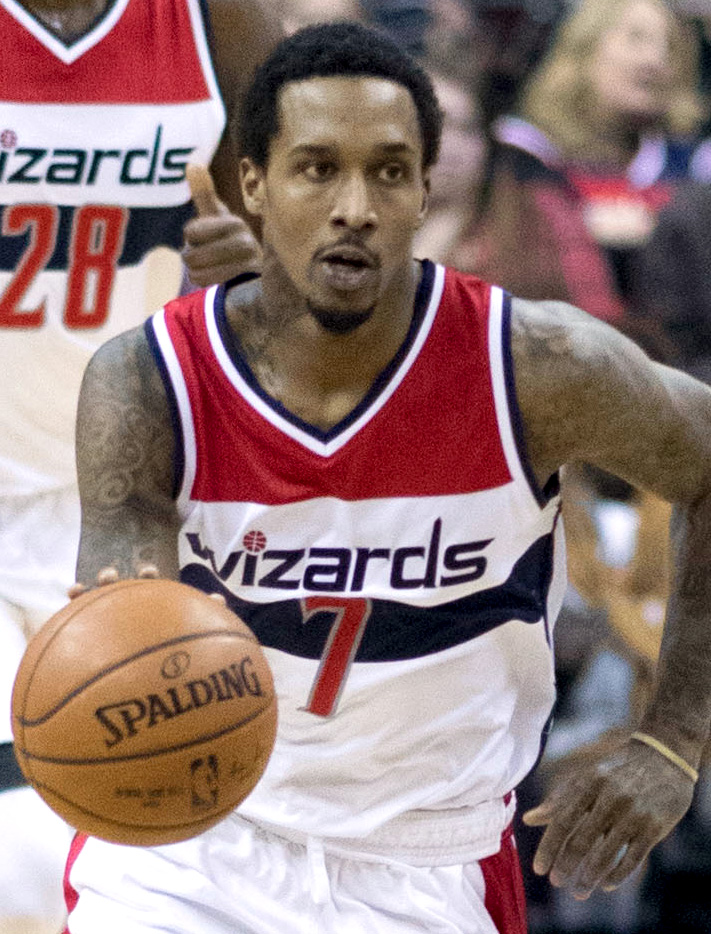
- Jennings with the Washington Wizards in 2017

Personal information
- Born: September 23, 1989 (age 37) Compton, California, U.S.
- Listed height: 6 ft 1 in (1.85 m)
- Listed weight: 170 lb (77 kg)

Career information
- High school: Dominguez (Compton, California); Oak Hill Academy (Mouth of Wilson, Virginia)
- NBA draft: 2009: 1st round, 10th overall pick
- Drafted by: Milwaukee Bucks
- Playing career: 2008–2018
- Position: Point guard
- Number: 3, 7, 55, 11

Career history
- 2008–2009: Lottomatica Roma
- 2009–2013: Milwaukee Bucks
- 2013–2016: Detroit Pistons
- 2015: →Grand Rapids Drive
- 2016: Orlando Magic
- 2016–2017: New York Knicks
- 2017: Washington Wizards
- 2017: Shanxi Brave Dragons
- 2018: Wisconsin Herd
- 2018: Milwaukee Bucks
- 2018: Zenit Saint Petersburg

Career highlights
- NBA All-Rookie First Team (2010); National high school player of the year (2008); McDonald's All-American (2008); First-team Parade All-American (2008); Third-team Parade All-American (2007)

Career statistics
- Points: 7,801 (14.1 ppg)
- Rebounds: 1,659 (3.0 rpg)
- Assists: 3,151 (5.7 apg)
- Stats at NBA.com
- Stats at Basketball Reference

Brandon Byron Jennings (born September 23, 1989) is an American former professional basketball player who played nine seasons in the National Basketball Association (NBA). He is known for being the first American high school prospect to bypass college basketball to play professionally in Europe.

After he graduated from Oak Hill Academy, Jennings played for professional basketball club Lottomatica Roma in Rome, Italy. After a year overseas, he declared for the 2009 NBA draft and was selected 10th overall by the Milwaukee Bucks. Jennings played four seasons in Milwaukee before being traded to the Detroit Pistons in 2013. He spent his next three seasons in Detroit before he was traded to the Orlando Magic in 2016. He went on to split the 2016–17 season between the New York Knicks and Washington Wizards before a final stint in Milwaukee in the 2017–18 season. Jennings also played in the Chinese Basketball Association and the VTB United League.

== Early life ==
Jennings was born to Alice Knox in Compton, California. He has a half brother named Terrence Phillips, a former guard for the Missouri Tigers. His father died when he was young.

== High school career ==
Jennings attended Dominguez High School in Compton for his freshman and sophomore years. Before his junior year, Jennings transferred to Oak Hill Academy in Mouth of Wilson, Virginia. As a junior, he led his 2006–2007 Oak Hill team to a 41–1 record and the top ranking in the USA Today Super 25 list of high school teams. In his last year of high school, Jennings averaged 35.5 points per game and set the school record for points in a season (1,312). This performance earned him some of high school basketball's most prestigious awards: the 2008 Naismith Prep Player of the Year Award, 2007–08 Gatorade Player of the Year (Virginia), 2008 Parade Magazine Player of the Year, and 2008 EA Sports Player of the Year. He was rated as the nation's #1 high school basketball prospect in the class of 2008 by Scout.com, the #1 prospect in the ESPNU 150, and the #4 prospect by Rivals.com.

== College career ==
In August 2006, Jennings was initially set to join USC. On April 24, 2007, he instead committed to the Arizona Wildcats, citing Arizona's quality academic faculty and his desire to play with Jerryd Bayless. In November 2007, SLAM Magazine's third edition of PUNKS featured Jennings on the cover along with three other top-rated high school guards (Jrue Holiday, Tyreke Evans and Lance Stephenson).

In June 2008, Jennings attended the premiere of Beastie Boys' Adam Yauch's basketball movie Gunnin' For That #1 Spot at the Magic Johnson Theatre in Harlem. Also attending were Kevin Love, Stephenson, Brook Lopez, Robin Lopez, and D. J. Augustin. The film follows eight top high school players—including Jennings—from their hometowns to New York City for the 2006 Elite 24 at Rucker Park.

In June 2008, Jennings announced that he was considering becoming the first American to skip college to play professionally in the Euroleague. The NBA requires players to be at least 19 years old and one year removed from high school before entering the league, meaning that Jennings could not enter the 2008 NBA draft. Jennings declared that his goal was to play in the NBA and that playing overseas instead of at an American college could be his best route to gain experience and make money until he was eligible to join the NBA.

== Professional career ==
=== Lottomatica Roma (2008–2009) ===
On July 16, 2008, Jennings signed with Lottomatica Roma of the Italian Serie A. The contract he signed with Roma was for $1.65 million net income guaranteed. After earning the contract with Lottomatica, Under Armour gave Jennings a $2 million contract to showcase their products in the Euroleague. Jennings was the first American player to go straight from high school to play professionally for a European team rather than play for a college basketball team since the NBA's age restriction rule was implemented.

In the Serie A 2008–09 season, Jennings averaged 5.5 points in 17.0 minutes per game over 27 games. He shot 35.1% from the field and 20.7% from 3-point range. In 16 Euroleague games, Jennings averaged 7.6 points in 19.6 minutes per game, shooting 38.7% from the field and 26.8% from 3-point range.

=== Milwaukee Bucks (2009–2013) ===
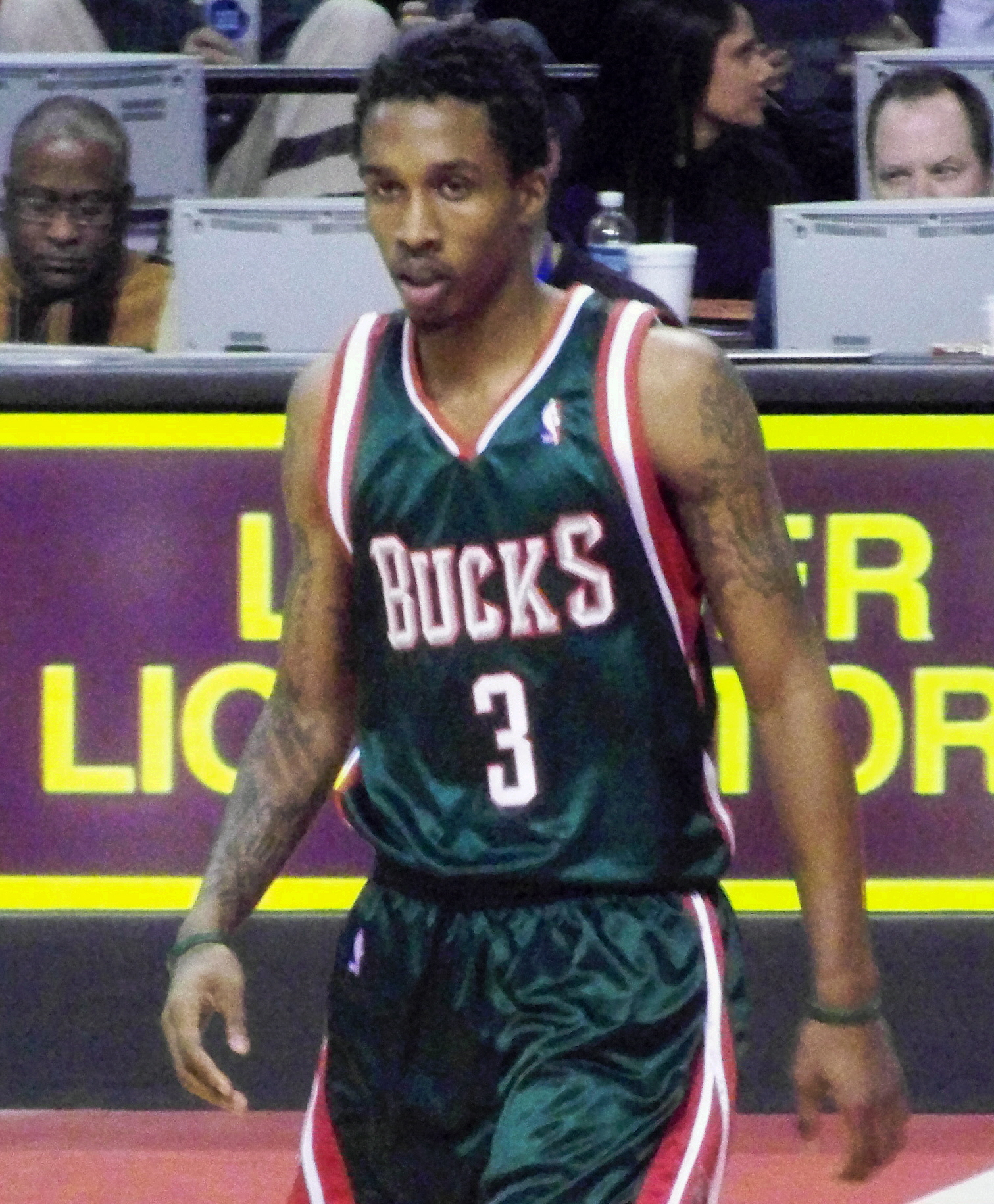
Jennings with the Bucks in 2009

Jennings was selected tenth overall by the Milwaukee Bucks in the 2009 NBA draft, becoming the first player who skipped college to play professional basketball in Europe to be drafted by an NBA team. He made his NBA regular season debut on October 30, 2009, against the Philadelphia 76ers. He nearly recorded a triple double, scoring 17 points and recording 9 rebounds and 9 assists in 34 minutes.

On November 14, 2009, in just his seventh game in the NBA, after being held scoreless in the first quarter, Jennings scored 55 points in a win over the Golden State Warriors. Jennings's 55 points broke the team record for most points in a game by a rookie, previously set by Kareem Abdul-Jabbar in 1970, and was more than any rookie scored since Earl Monroe scored 56 in 1968. He became the youngest player to ever score 55, collecting the second-highest total for a player under 21, behind only LeBron James's 56 points in March 2005, and the second-most points scored by a Milwaukee Buck (behind Michael Redd's 57 in 2006). His 55-point tally was also the highest for any NBA player in a 2009–10 regular season contest.

During All-Star Weekend, he competed in the Skills Challenge. Jennings started all 82 games as a rookie and led the Bucks to the playoffs for the first time in four seasons, where they lost to the Atlanta Hawks in seven games. He finished third in Rookie of the Year voting.

On October 30, 2010, Jennings recorded his first ever triple double with 20 points, 10 rebounds, and 10 assists in a win against the Charlotte Bobcats. On December 15, 2010, Jennings broke his left foot against the San Antonio Spurs when he came down awkwardly on his ankle. Despite the injury, he finished the game and played 30 minutes the following game against the Utah Jazz. The team later confirmed that Jennings would miss the next four to six weeks as he recovered from surgery to repair a fracture in his left foot. Jennings missed a total of 19 games with the injury. He scored a season-high 37 points against the New York Knicks at Madison Square Garden on March 25, 2011. With Milwaukee struggling in Jennings's absence and his slow return to form after the injury, the Bucks missed the playoffs.

With the NBA beginning the 2011–12 season in a lockout, Jennings played in the Drew League to stay in shape and prepare for the season. With the schedule shortened after the lockout ended, Jennings played and started in all of the 66 games. He recorded career highs with 19.1 points and 1.6 steals in 35.3 minutes per game.

Similar to the previous season, his season high in points came in Madison Square Garden against the Knicks; this time, Jennings scored 36 points in a 100–86 win. The Bucks again missed the NBA playoffs, finishing in ninth place in the East.

With Jennings set to hit restricted free agency at the end of the 2012–13 season, he sought a long-term contract, saying he would not return to Milwaukee if they did not work out an agreement.

During the Bucks' home opener against the Cleveland Cavaliers, Jennings made a game-winning three at the buzzer to win the game for the Bucks. Jennings teamed up with Monta Ellis, who was acquired at the 2012 trade deadline, to form one of the NBA's most potent backcourts that year. With improved play under new coach Jim Boylan, Milwaukee returned to the playoffs for the first time since Jennings was a rookie, qualifying as the eighth seed. They were swept 4–0 by the reigning champions, the Miami Heat, who would go on to win the NBA Finals again. After the team lost Game 2, Jennings proclaimed the Bucks would win the series in six. The phrase "Bucks in 6" subsequently became a famous phrase among the fanbase, commonly used during the 2021 NBA Playoffs when the Bucks won the NBA Finals, coincidentally in six games after trailing 2–0. Jennings was subsequently invited to participate in the team's championship parade and helped design their championship rings.

=== Detroit Pistons (2013–2016) ===
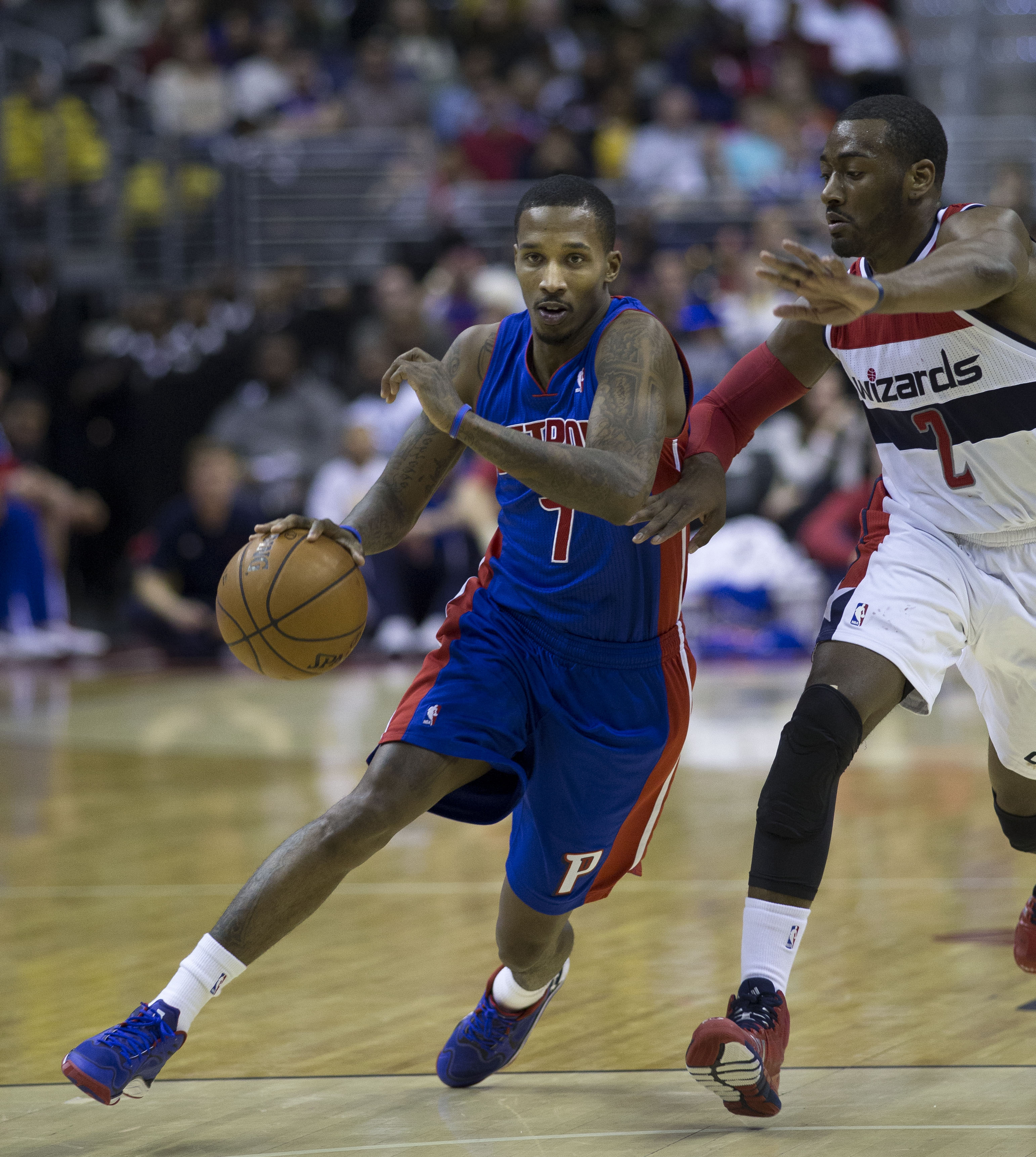
Jennings with the Pistons in 2014

On July 31, 2013, Jennings was signed-and-traded to the Detroit Pistons in exchange for Brandon Knight, Khris Middleton and Viacheslav Kravtsov. He agreed to a three-year contract, reportedly worth $25 million.

On December 5, 2013, Jennings returned to Milwaukee in a 105–98 win over the Bucks, finishing with 17 points and 11 assists. On January 11, 2014, in a game against the Phoenix Suns, Jennings recorded 16 assists in the first half, tying Isiah Thomas' franchise record for the most assists in a half.

On January 16, 2015, Jennings scored a season-high 37 points on 10-of-23 shooting in the 98–96 win over the Indiana Pacers. Five days later, he recorded 24 points and a career-high 21 assists in the 128–118 win over the Orlando Magic, becoming the first player to record a 20-point, 20-assist game in the NBA since Steve Nash in 2009.

On January 25, 2015, Jennings was ruled out for the rest of the season due to a ruptured left Achilles tendon that required surgery. On the season, he averaged 15.4 points, 6.6 assists and 1.1 steals in 41 games.

On December 17, 2015, Jennings voluntarily reported to the Grand Rapids Drive, the Pistons' D-League affiliate, on a rehab assignment. In his debut with the Drive on December 19, Jennings recorded a double-double with 11 points and 12 assists in 27 minutes against the Iowa Energy. He was recalled by the Pistons the next day. On December 29, Jennings made his first appearance of the season for the Pistons, scoring seven points and adding four assists in 16 minutes off the bench against the New York Knicks. He had a season-best game in his fourth game back from injury, recording 17 points and 6 assists off the bench on January 4 in a 115–89 win over the Orlando Magic.

=== Orlando Magic (2016) ===
On February 16, 2016, Jennings was traded to the Orlando Magic, along with Ersan İlyasova, in exchange for Tobias Harris. The next day, he made his debut with the Magic in a 110–104 win over the Dallas Mavericks, recording 18 points, three rebounds and four assists in 25 minutes.

=== New York Knicks (2016–2017) ===
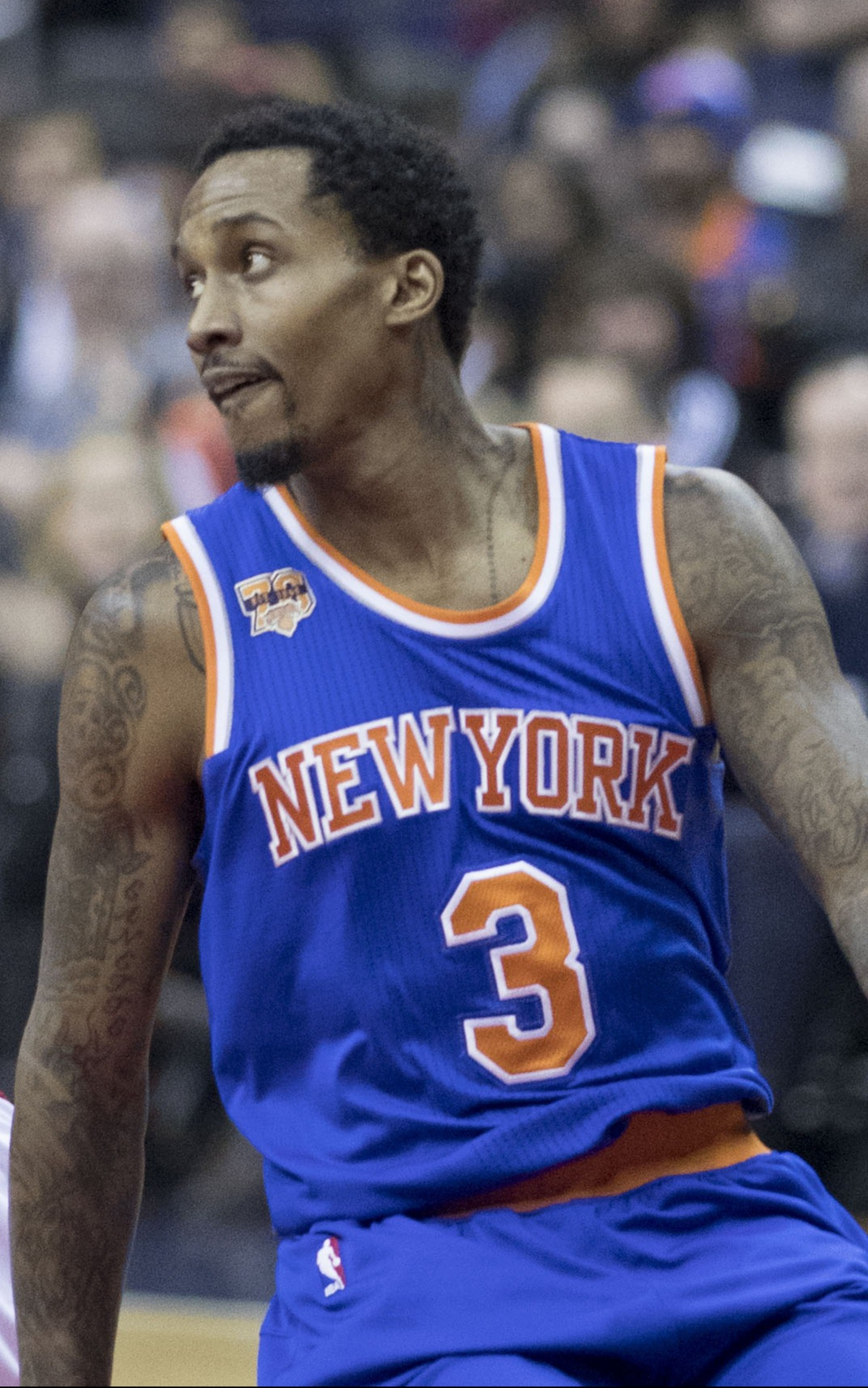
Jennings with the Knicks in 2017

On July 8, 2016, Jennings signed with the New York Knicks. He debuted in the Knicks's season opener on October 25, 2016, against the Cleveland Cavaliers. In 21 minutes off the bench, he recorded seven points, three rebounds and five assists in a 117–88 loss. On December 11, he scored 15 of his season high-tying 19 points in the fourth quarter of the Knicks' 118–112 win over the Los Angeles Lakers. On December 31, he set a new season high with 32 points in a 129–122 loss to the Houston Rockets.

On February 27, 2017, he was waived by the Knicks. He had previously requested a trade due to lack of playing time and team success in New York.

=== Washington Wizards (2017) ===
On March 1, 2017, Jennings signed with the Washington Wizards. That year the Wizards won the division for the first time in 38 years.

In Game 3 of the Eastern Conference semi-finals against the Boston Celtics in the 2017 NBA Playoffs, Jennings had a brief scuffle with reserve Terry Rozier that led to both players ejected from the game. Jennings and the Wizards would go on to lose to the Celtics in seven games.

=== Shanxi Brave Dragons (2017) ===
On July 28, 2017, Jennings accepted a one-year, $1.5 million deal to play for the Shanxi Brave Dragons of the Chinese Basketball Association. On December 9, 2017, he was released by Shanxi. In 13 games, he averaged 27.8 points, 5.1 rebounds, 6.8 assists and 2.7 steals per game.

=== Wisconsin Herd (2018) ===
On February 13, 2018, Jennings was acquired by the Wisconsin Herd of the NBA G League.

=== Return to Milwaukee (2018) ===
On March 11, 2018, Jennings signed a 10-day contract with the Milwaukee Bucks, returning to the franchise for a second stint. The following day, in his first game back with the Bucks, Jennings finished two rebounds shy of a triple-double with 16 points and 12 assists in a 121–103 win over the Memphis Grizzlies. He signed a second 10-day contract on March 21, and a multi-year contract on April 1. On August 1, 2018, he was waived by the Bucks.

=== Zenit Saint Petersburg (2018) ===
On August 20, 2018, Jennings signed a one-year deal with the Russian team Zenit Saint Petersburg of the VTB United League. His contract with Zenit was terminated on November 20, 2018, after only 10 games and days after an Instagram post he made stating "Lesson in life: I will never play for a team and the dad is coaching his SON! Never again!" The father-son duo at the club at the time of his Instagram post were Vasily Karasev (then head coach of Zenit Saint Petersburg) and former NBA player Sergey Karasev.

== Career statistics ==
Legend
GP	Games played	GS	Games started	MPG	Minutes per game
FG%	Field-goal percentage	3P%	3-point field-goal percentage	FT%	Free-throw percentage
RPG	Rebounds per game	APG	Assists per game	SPG	Steals per game
BPG	Blocks per game	PPG	Points per game	PIR	Performance index rating
**Bold**	Career high	*	Led the league

=== NBA ===
==== Regular season ====
Year	Team	GP	GS	MPG	FG%	3P%	FT%	RPG	APG	SPG	BPG	PPG
2009–10	Milwaukee	**82***	**82***	32.6	.371	.374	.817	3.4	5.7	1.3	.2	15.5
2010–11	Milwaukee	63	61	34.4	.390	.323	.809	**3.7**	4.8	1.5	**.3**	16.2
2011–12	Milwaukee	66*	66*	35.3	**.418**	.332	.808	3.4	5.5	**1.6**	**.3**	**19.1**
2012–13	Milwaukee	80	80	**36.2**	.399	**.375**	.819	3.1	6.5	**1.6**	.1	17.5
2013–14	Detroit	80	79	34.1	.373	.337	.751	3.1	**7.6**	1.3	.1	15.5
2014–15	Detroit	41	41	28.6	.401	.360	.839	2.5	6.6	1.1	.1	15.4
2015–16	Detroit	23	1	18.1	.371	.312	.711	2.0	3.0	.5	.1	6.8
2015–16	Orlando	25	6	18.1	.366	.346	.750	2.0	4.0	.7	.2	7.0
2016–17	New York	58	11	24.6	.380	.340	.756	2.6	4.9	.9	.1	8.6
2016–17	Washington	23	2	16.3	.274	.212	.706	1.9	4.7	.7	.0	3.5
2017–18	Milwaukee	14	0	14.6	.375	.273	**1.000**	2.2	3.1	.4	**.3**	5.2
Career		555	429	30.3	.387	.345	.796	3.0	5.7	1.2	.2	14.1

==== Playoffs ====
Year	Team	GP	GS	MPG	FG%	3P%	FT%	RPG	APG	SPG	BPG	PPG
2010	Milwaukee	7	**7**	**35.6**	**.408**	**.293**	.808	**3.0**	3.6	1.1	**.6**	**18.7**
2013	Milwaukee	4	4	33.3	.298	.214	.722	2.3	**4.0**	**2.3**	.3	13.3
2017	Washington	**13**	0	13.7	.389	.154	.875	1.5	1.8	.2	.0	2.8
2018	Milwaukee	1	0	5.0	.000	.000	**1.000**	.0	.0	.0	.0	2.0
Career		25	11	22.6	.372	.238	.796	2.0	2.6	.8	.2	8.9

=== EuroLeague ===
Year	Team	GP	GS	MPG	FG%	3P%	FT%	RPG	APG	SPG	BPG	PPG	PIR
2008–09	Lottomatica Roma	16	7	19.6	.387	.268	.774	1.6	1.6	1.2	.1	7.6	5.1
Career		16	7	19.6	.387	.268	.774	1.6	1.6	1.2	.1	7.6	5.1

== Awards ==
- 2005 Press Telegram Freshmen Player of the Year
- Named the Most Valuable Player of the 2006 Les Schwab Invitational Tournament
- Co-MVP of the 2007 Elite 24 Hoops Classic (with Tyreke Evans)
- 2007 Third-team Parade All-American
- 2007 Las Vegas Easter Classic Most Valuable Player
- 2007 NBAPS Top 100 High School Camp Best Playmaker
- 2007 The Goazcats.com Showdown Most Valuable Player
- 2008 Naismith Male Player of the year
- 2007–08 Gatorade Player of the year Virginia
- 2008 Parade Magazine Player of the Year
- 2008 EA SPORTS National Player of the Year
- 2008 McDonald's All-American
- 2008 First-team Parade All-American
- 2007–08 MaxPreps National Player of the Year
- 2008 Jordan Brand Classic Most Valuable Player for the East
- No. 1 rated senior by ESPN (2008)
- No. 1 rated senior by Van Coleman Hoopmaster (2008)
- No. 1 rated senior by Clark Franics Hoopscoop (2007 and 2008)
- No. 1 rated senior by Dave Telep Scout.com 2008
- Eastern Conference NBA Rookie of the Month (Oct./Nov. 2009)
- Eastern Conference NBA Rookie of the Month (Dec. 2009)
- Eastern Conference NBA Rookie of the Month (Jan. 2010)
- 2009–10 NBA 1st Team All-Rookie (unanimous selection)

== Records ==
NBA records

- Youngest player in NBA history to score 50 or more points in a game
  - 20 years, 52 days
  - 55 points, Milwaukee Bucks vs. Golden State Warriors, November 14, 2009

Ranks 2nd in NBA history in:

- Field goals made, quarter
  - 12, third quarter, Milwaukee Bucks vs. Golden State Warriors, November 14, 2009
  - Tied with six other players who have made 12 field goals in a quarter
  - NBA record is held by David Thompson and Klay Thompson, tied with 13

Milwaukee Bucks franchise records
Rookie

- Points, game, rookie: 55, vs. Golden State Warriors, November 14, 2009
  - Tied with multiple players for 4th highest tally in NBA history by a rookie
- Field goals made, game, rookie: 21, vs. Golden State Warriors, November 14, 2009

Franchise

- Points, half: 45, second half, vs. Golden State Warriors, November 14, 2009
- Points, quarter: 29, third quarter, vs. Golden State Warriors, November 14, 2009
- Field goals made, half: 17, second half, vs. Golden State Warriors, November 14, 2009
- Field goals made, quarter: 12, third quarter, vs. Golden State Warriors, November 14, 2009

== Personal life ==
After the 2009 L'Aquila earthquake, Jennings donated $50,000 to support victims. Jennings participated in Steve Nash's Showdown in Chinatown charity soccer match in New York City on June 24, 2010.

In 2011, Jennings became engaged to actress and singer Teyana Taylor; the pair ended their relationship in 2013.

Jennings, specifically his tense relationship with Milwaukee coach Scott Skiles, was the subject of the song "Chartjunk" by the rock band Stephen Malkmus and the Jicks, in 2014.
