= Showdown in Chinatown =

Charity soccer match in New York, 2008–2012

Showdown in Chinatown is an annual charity soccer match organized by basketball player Steve Nash and soccer player Claudio Reyna to benefit their respective charity foundations. The first edition was a nine-a-side match played on June 25, 2008 while the second edition was an eight-a-side match played on June 24, 2009. Both matches took place at Sara D. Roosevelt Park on the Lower East Side of Manhattan, New York City, and have featured two teams made up of National Basketball Association and international soccer players.

== Inspiration and origins ==
Nash and Reyna became friends, as Nash spent his off-seasons in New York City and regularly played pick-up soccer, and Reyna played for the New York Red Bulls of Major League Soccer. During the summer of 2007, Nash and Reyna attempted to play a pick-up game between one of Nash's teams and the Red Bulls in Central Park's Sheep Meadow, but park regulations prohibited ball playing on the field.

The idea for the 2008 match came from Nash and Italian journalist and NBA TV analyst Simone Sandri, who asked Nash's friend Venanzio Ciampa, the president of the marketing firm The Promotion Factory, to organize the event. Ciampa said they chose Sara D. Roosevelt Park as the venue, because they "wanted a cool spot", and the park "shows the melting pot aspect of New York that Steve and I love."

== 2008 ==
=== Teams ===
==== Team Nash ====
- Davide Di Malta (GK)
- Maurizio Bacci
- Leandro Barbosa (Phoenix Suns)
- Raja Bell (Phoenix Suns)
- Robbie Fowler (Cardiff City)
- Thierry Henry (FC Barcelona)
- Steve McManaman (retired)
- Steve Nash (Phoenix Suns)
- Simone Sandri (NBA TV)
- Venanzio Ciampa
- Rob Jones (retired)

==== Team Reyna ====
- Mike Quarino (New York Red Bulls employee) (GK)
- Jozy Altidore (Villareal)
- Gregg Berhalter (1860 München)
- Baron Davis (Golden State Warriors)
- Salomon Kalou (Chelsea F.C.)
- Jason Kidd (Dallas Mavericks)
- Alessandro Nivola
- Claudio Reyna (New York Red Bulls)
- Giovanni Savarese (retired)
- Juan Pablo Ángel (New York Red Bulls)
- Marc Stein (ESPN.com)

Of the players in the match, Nash, Leandro Barbosa and Raja Bell played together on the Phoenix Suns, and all grew up playing soccer. Basketball players Jason Kidd, who calls soccer "my first sport", and Baron Davis, as well as ESPN.com basketball writer Marc Stein, a Manchester City FC supporter, and Sandri, who had played professionally in Italy.

Reyna, Juan Pablo Angel and Jozy Altidore, who had completed a move to Villarreal CF in Spain earlier that month, played together for the Red Bulls, while Giovanni Savarese played for the club from 1996 to 1998, when it was known as the MetroStars. Other professional soccer players who took part Thierry Henry and Steve McManaman, both friends of Nash, McManaman's former Liverpool F.C. teammates Robbie Fowler and Rob jones, Reyna's united States national team teammate Gregg Berhalter, and Salomon Kalou, who heard about the match and happened to be on holiday in New York City.

=== Match result ===
Team Nash beat Team Reyna Team, on three goals from Robbie Fowler and two goals each from Henry and Nash. Team Nash started the match down 0-2, but Henry took control of the game with a shift to a more attacking 1-3-3 formation, assisting on a goal by McManaman and scoring the equalizer himself.

- Goals:
  - Team Reyna: Davis, Kalou (2), Reyna.
  - Team Nash: Barbosa, Fowler (3), Henry (2), McManaman, Nash (2).
- Bookings:
  - Team Reyna: Davis
  - Team Nash: Henry

=== Crowd ===
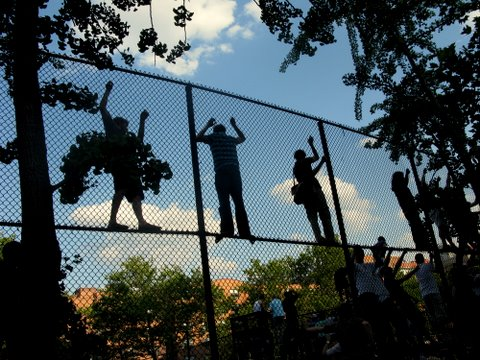
Fans hanging on a fence to watch the action

Admission for the match was free, and the all-star lineups attracted over a thousand spectators, what Stein described as "at least 2,500 people", and fans packed the field two-deep around the field and four-deep around the outside fences. Other fans climbed on top of cars, trees, fences and streetlights to get a view, and SLAM writer Lang Whitaker wrote, "it looked like the famous picture of Dr. J at Rucker." Reyna said of the crowd, "We had it completely wrong in terms of the excitement. We knew people were going to come out, but we just couldn’t believe it when we showed.", while Henry, who was mobbed by journalists and autograph seekers said, "I think it was great. I didn't know it was going to be like a lot of people around the Astroturf. But I guess they wanted to see Steve, Baron and the other guys there. I don't know, I think it was a great environment."

== 2009 ==
=== Teams ===
==== Team Nash ====
- Francesco Santoro (GK)
- Steve Nash (Phoenix Suns)
- Martin Nash (Vancouver Whitecaps)
- Thierry Henry (FC Barcelona)
- Mathieu Flamini (AC Milan)
- Simone Sandri (NBATV)
- Ryan Babel (Liverpool F.C.)
- Edgar Davids (retired)
- Grant Hill (Phoenix Suns)

==== Team Reyna ====
- Mike Quarino (Philadelphia Union employee) (GK)
- Claudio Reyna (retired)
- Javier Zanetti (Inter Milan)
- Iván Córdoba (Inter Milan)
- Salomon Kalou (Chelsea F.C.)
- Adrian Mutu (Fiorentina)
- Chris Bosh (Toronto Raptors)
- Tony Parker (San Antonio Spurs)
- Marc Stein (ESPN.com)

=== Match result ===
Team Reyna won 8-5

== 2010 ==
Steve Nash and Claudio Reyna once again captained the two sides in the 2010 match. Several soccer players (such as Thierry Henry, Salomon Kalou and Jozy Altidore) who had participated in the event in past years were unable to attend due to the 2010 World Cup in South Africa.

Players in the 2010 match included ESPN reporter Marc Stein; NBA players Brandon Jennings, Tony Parker, Nate Robinson Jared Dudley and Raja Bell; and soccer players Giuseppe Rossi and Youri Djorkaeff. Robinson claimed it was his first ever time playing soccer, despite scoring a goal.

== 2011 ==
=== Teams ===
==== Team Nash ====
- Steve Nash (Phoenix Suns)
- Martin Nash (Vancouver Whitecaps)
- Simone Sandri (NBA TV)
- Leandro Barbosa (Phoenix Suns)
- Raja Bell (Utah Jazz)
- Giuseppe Rossi (Villarreal)
- Richie Williams (retired)
- John Nash

==== Team Reyna ====
- Claudio Reyna (retired)
- Tony Parker (San Antonio Spurs)
- Marcin Gortat (Phoenix Suns)
- Marc Stein (ESPN.com)
- Brandon Jennings (Milwaukee Bucks)
- Patrick Vieira (Manchester City)
- Demba Ba (Newcastle United)
- Grant Hill (Phoenix Suns)
- Jared Dudley (Phoenix Suns)
- Youri Djorkaeff (retired)

=== Match result ===
Team Nash won 16-10, and Giuseppe Rossi won the Hublot MVP award.

== 2012 ==
=== Teams ===
==== Team "World" ====
- Steve Nash (Phoenix Suns)
- Simone Sandri (NBA TV)
- Giuseppe Rossi (Villareal)
- Salomon Kalou (Chelsea)
- Charly Ludi (Novara)
- Emmerson Boyce (Wigan Athletic)
- Elton Brand (Philadelphia 76ers)
- Alessandro Noselli (Sassuolo)
- Enrico Zanus

==== Team "USA" ====
- Robbie Rogers (Leeds United)
- Marc Stein (ESPN.com)
- Maurice Edu (Rangers)
- Stuart Holden (Bolton Wanderers)
- Jimmy Conrad (Retired)
- Danny Green (San Antonio Spurs)
- Mike Dunleavy Jr. (Milwaukee Bucks)
- Mehdi Ballouchy (New York Red Bulls)

=== Match result ===
Team World won 9-7, and Salomon Kalou won the Gucci MVP award.
