= Chris Douglas-Roberts =

American basketball player (born 1987)

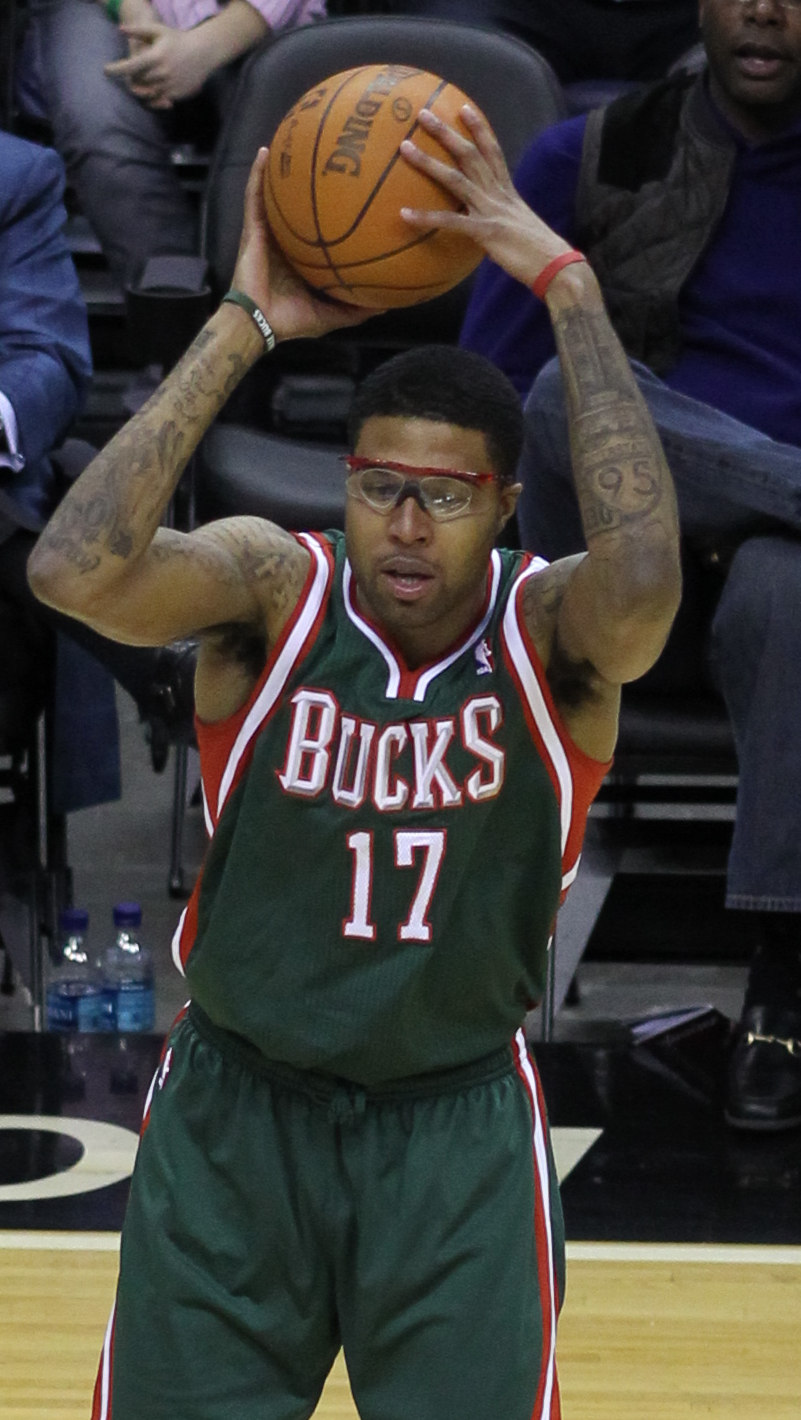
- Douglas-Roberts with the Milwaukee Bucks in 2011

Personal information
- Born: January 8, 1987 (age 39) Detroit, Michigan, U.S.
- Listed height: 6 ft 7 in (2.01 m)
- Listed weight: 200 lb (91 kg)

Career information
- High school: Cass Technical (Detroit, Michigan); Northwestern (Detroit, Michigan)
- College: Memphis (2005–2008)
- NBA draft: 2008: 2nd round, 40th overall pick
- Drafted by: New Jersey Nets
- Playing career: 2008–2016
- Position: Small forward / shooting guard
- Number: 17, 55, 14

Career history
- 2008–2010: New Jersey Nets
- 2010–2011: Milwaukee Bucks
- 2011–2012: Virtus Bologna
- 2012: Texas Legends
- 2012–2013: Dallas Mavericks
- 2013: Texas Legends
- 2013–2014: Charlotte Bobcats
- 2014–2015: Los Angeles Clippers
- 2016: Texas Legends

Career highlights
- Consensus first-team All-American (2008); Conference USA Player of the Year (2008); 2× First-team All-Conference USA (2007, 2008)
- Stats at NBA.com
- Stats at Basketball Reference

Chris Douglas Roberts (born January 8, 1987) is an American former professional basketball player. He played college basketball for the University of Memphis.

== High school career ==
Douglas-Roberts played high school basketball at Cass Technical High School and Northwestern High School. He played for Cass Tech in 2003 and 2004 averaging 28 points, 10 rebounds and six assists. After the 2004 season he transferred to Northwestern where he saw limited time due to transfer rules and didn't join the team until the second semester. He finished the season averaging 13.8 points and 5.4 rebounds per game.

Considered a four-star recruit by Rivals.com, Douglas-Roberts was listed as the No. 26 shooting guard and the No. 75 player in the nation in 2005.

== College career ==
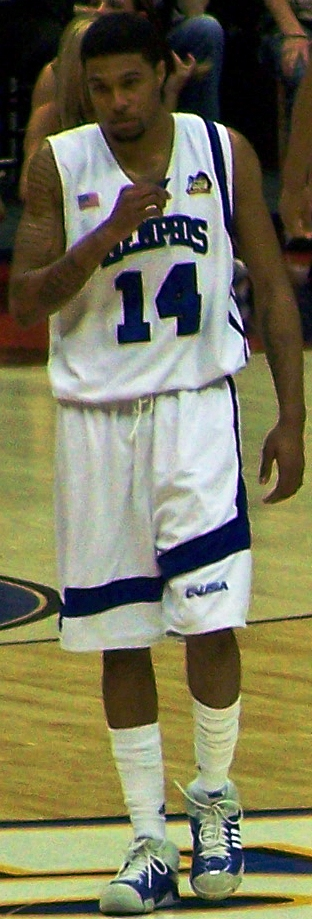
Douglas-Roberts in the 2008 NCAA tournament Final Four

During his freshman season he played in 34 games starting 25. He finished the season averaging 8.3 points, 3.3 rebounds, and 1.5 assists per game. Because of his great play he was on the Conference USA All-Freshman Team.

During his sophomore season he started all 35 games he played in. He led the Tigers with 15.4 points per game and received many honors including All-Conference USA first team and Associated Press All-America honorable mention among others.

During his junior year, he helped the Tigers reach the 2008 NCAA tournament, averaging 23.3 points over six games as the Tigers finished in second place, losing in the National Championship game to the Kansas Jayhawks 75–68 in overtime.

At the end of the season he earned first-team All-American honors. He finished his college career with 1,545 points.

== Professional career ==
=== NBA ===
On April 18, 2008, Douglas-Roberts announced that he would be declaring for the 2008 NBA draft. He was selected by the New Jersey Nets with the 40th overall pick, and on July 9, 2008, the Nets officially signed him.

On June 25, 2010, Douglas-Roberts was traded by the Nets to the Milwaukee Bucks for a 2012 second-round draft pick.

=== Italy ===
In September 2011, Douglas-Roberts joined Virtus Bologna of Italy.

=== Second NBA stint and D-League ===
On October 1, 2012, Douglas-Roberts signed with the Los Angeles Lakers, but was waived on October 22. On October 27, Douglas-Roberts signed with the Dallas Mavericks along with center Melvin Ely, however, the two were waived the next day. On November 1, 2012, he was acquired by the Texas Legends of the NBA D-League.

On December 23, 2012, he re-signed with the Dallas Mavericks. On January 6, 2013, he was waived by the Mavericks.

In July 2013, Douglas-Roberts joined the Los Angeles Lakers for the 2013 NBA Summer League. On October 2, 2013, he signed with the New York Knicks. However, he was later waived by the Knicks on October 25, 2013.

In November 2013, Douglas-Roberts was re-acquired by the Texas Legends. On December 11, 2013, he signed with the Charlotte Bobcats. On April 14, 2014, he hit a buzzer-beater to lift the Bobcats over the Atlanta Hawks, 95–93.

On September 3, 2014, Douglas-Roberts signed with the Los Angeles Clippers.

On January 15, 2015, Douglas-Roberts was acquired by the Boston Celtics in a three-team trade also involving the Phoenix Suns. Three days later, he was waived by the Celtics.

On September 18, 2015, Douglas-Roberts signed with New Orleans Pelicans. However, he was later waived by the Pelicans on October 23 after appearing in five preseason games. On February 29, 2016, he was reacquired by the Texas Legends.

Due to never playing a regular season game for the Celtics or the Pelicans when signing with them, Douglas-Roberts' final NBA game was played on January 11, 2015, in a 90–104 loss to the Miami Heat. Douglas-Roberts only played for 1 minute, being substituted at the very end of the game for JJ Redick.

== Business endeavors ==
He is currently the CEO and president of DCTG Media Agency.

== Legal issues ==
In October 2021, Douglas-Roberts was one of eighteen former NBA players charged with one count of conspiracy to commit health care and wire fraud in a health insurance fraud scheme involving the NBA's Health and Welfare Benefit Plan.

== NBA career statistics ==
Legend
GP	Games played	GS	Games started	MPG	Minutes per game
FG%	Field goal percentage	3P%	3-point field goal percentage	FT%	Free throw percentage
RPG	Rebounds per game	APG	Assists per game	SPG	Steals per game
BPG	Blocks per game	PPG	Points per game	**Bold**	Career high

=== Regular season ===
Year	Team	GP	GS	MPG	FG%	3P%	FT%	RPG	APG	SPG	BPG	PPG
2008–09	New Jersey	44	3	13.3	**.460**	.250	.823	1.1	1.2	.3	.2	4.9
2009–10	New Jersey	**67**	**38**	**25.8**	.445	.259	.847	**3.0**	**1.4**	**.8**	**.3**	**9.8**
2010–11	Milwaukee	44	12	20.1	.429	.326	.831	2.0	1.1	.7	**.3**	7.3
2012–13	Dallas	6	0	10.5	.357	.000	.700	.8	.7	.3	.0	2.8
2013–14	Charlotte	49	8	20.7	.440	**.386**	.805	2.4	1.0	.6	**.3**	6.9
2014–15	L.A. Clippers	12	0	8.6	.238	.143	**1.000**	1.0	.3	.1	.0	1.6
Career		222	61	19.7	.439	.329	.831	2.1	1.1	.6	.2	7.1

=== Playoffs ===
Year	Team	GP	GS	MPG	FG%	3P%	FT%	RPG	APG	SPG	BPG	PPG
2014	Charlotte	4	0	17.5	.688	.500	.857	2.0	.5	.0	.0	9.5
Career		4	0	17.5	.688	.500	.857	2.0	.5	.0	.0	9.5

== Personal ==
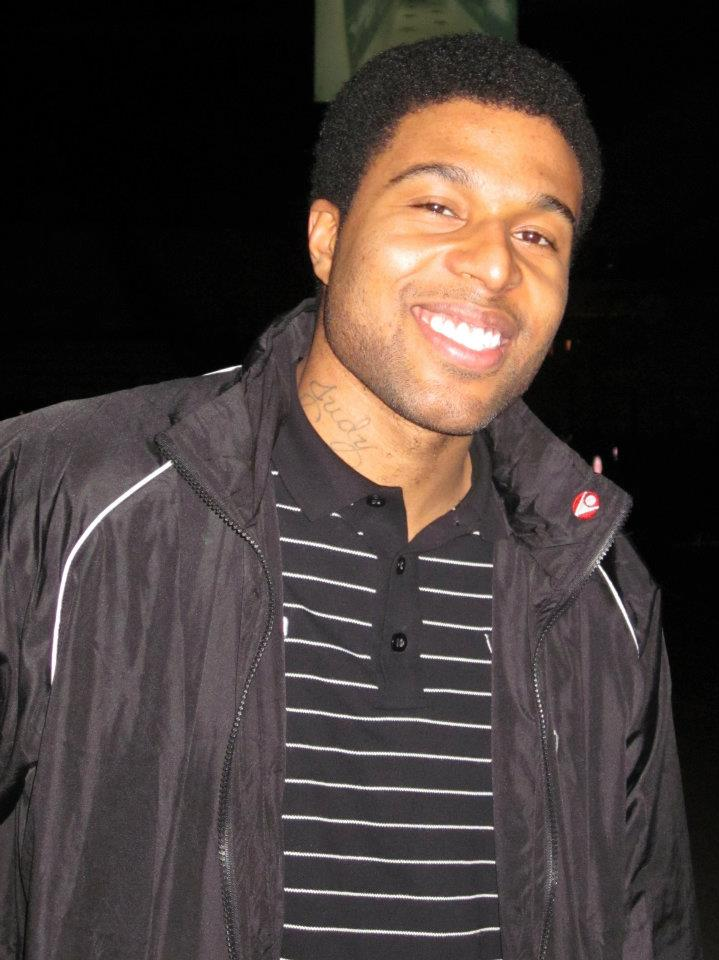
Douglas-Roberts in 2011

Douglas-Roberts has multiple tattoos on his neck and arms. One on the side of his neck is of his mother, one on the back of his neck has his initials (CDR), and one on his arm has verses 1–3 of Psalm 37 from the Bible. He taps the arm tattoo three times before shooting a free throw.

Douglas-Roberts suffered a retina tear in his eye during the 2010–11 pre-season. He began wearing protective eyewear after the surgery.
