= John Salmons =

American basketball player (born 1979)

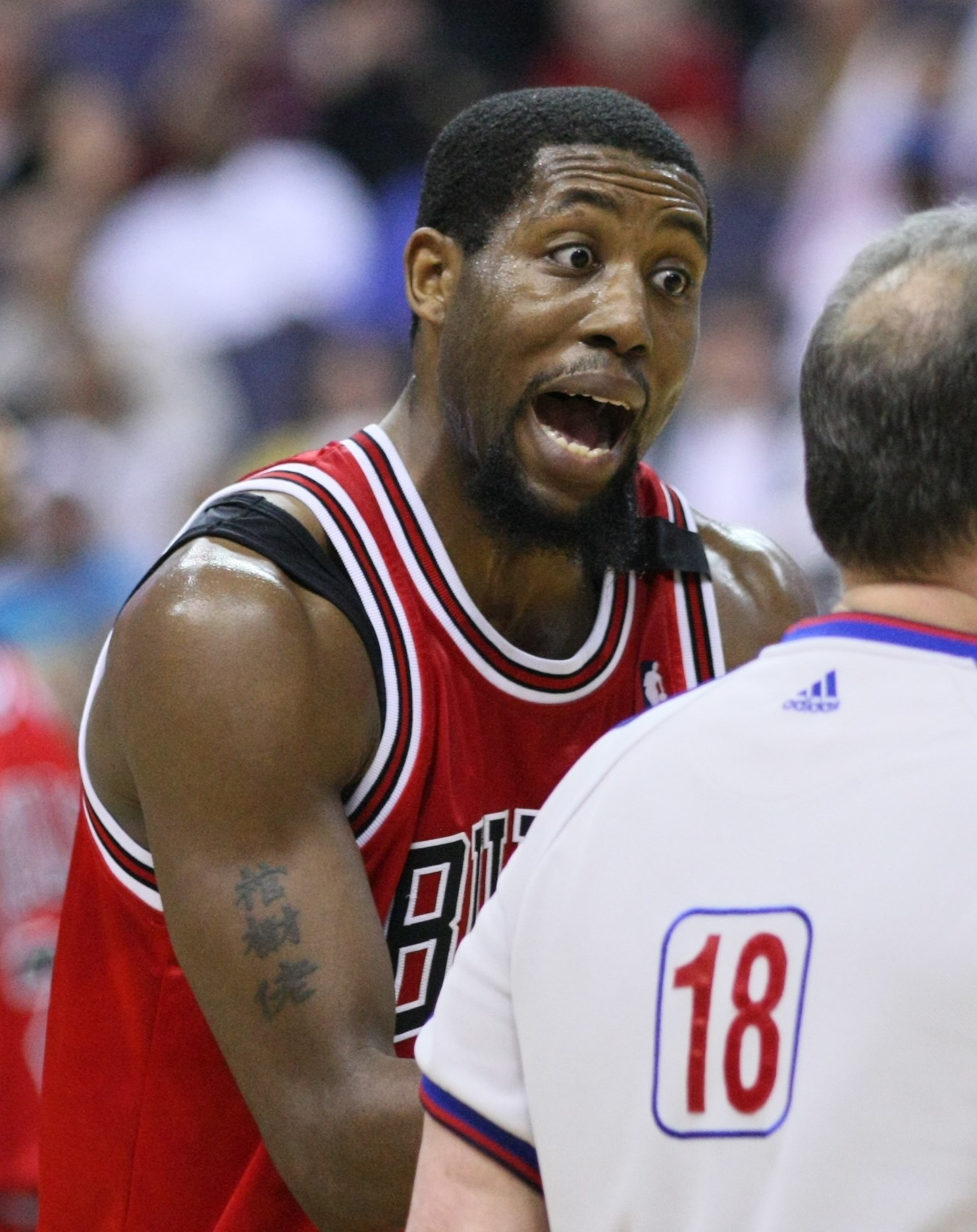
- Salmons with the Chicago Bulls in 2009

Personal information
- Born: December 12, 1979 (age 46) Philadelphia, Pennsylvania, U.S.
- Listed height: 6 ft 7 in (2.01 m)
- Listed weight: 210 lb (95 kg)

Career information
- High school: Plymouth-Whitemarsh (Plymouth Meeting, Pennsylvania)
- College: Miami (Florida) (1998–2002)
- NBA draft: 2002: 1st round, 26th overall pick
- Drafted by: San Antonio Spurs
- Playing career: 2002–2015
- Position: Small forward / shooting guard
- Number: 7, 15, 5, 25

Career history
- 2002–2006: Philadelphia 76ers
- 2006–2009: Sacramento Kings
- 2009–2010: Chicago Bulls
- 2010–2011: Milwaukee Bucks
- 2011–2013: Sacramento Kings
- 2013–2014: Toronto Raptors
- 2014–2015: New Orleans Pelicans

Career highlights
- Second-team All-Big East (2002); Third-team All-Big East (2001)
- Stats at NBA.com
- Stats at Basketball Reference

John Rashall Salmons (born December 12, 1979) is an American former professional basketball player who played 13 seasons in the National Basketball Association (NBA). He played college basketball for the Miami Hurricanes.

== Early life and education ==
Salmons was born on December 12, 1979, in Philadelphia.

=== High school career ===
In 1997, Salmons was a member of a Pennsylvania high school state championship team while playing for Plymouth-Whitemarsh High School in Plymouth Meeting, Pennsylvania. As a high school basketball player for Plymouth-Whitemarsh, he reached the 1,000 point club.

=== College career ===
He went on to play college basketball at the University of Miami, where he was a four-year starter for the Hurricanes. He started 107 consecutive games for Miami, the second longest streak in school history. He was also the first player in school history to surpass 1000 career points (1287), 600 rebounds (687), 400 assists (433), and 150 steals (192).

== NBA career ==
=== Philadelphia 76ers (2002–2006) ===
Salmons was drafted out of the University of Miami by the San Antonio Spurs with the 26th overall selection in the 2002 NBA draft. He was then immediately traded with Mark Bryant and the rights to Randy Holcomb to the Philadelphia 76ers for Speedy Claxton. Salmons played for the 76ers through the 2006 season, averaging 4.1 points per game.

=== Sacramento Kings (2006–2009) ===
Salmons was set to be acquired by the Toronto Raptors on July 13, 2006, in a sign-and-trade deal with Philadelphia. On July 21, 2006, however, there were reports that Salmons was having second thoughts about going to Toronto, and the sign and trade to Toronto was canceled.

On July 24, 2006, Salmons signed a multi-year contract with the Sacramento Kings. On December 22, 2006, he recorded his first triple-double of his NBA career against the Denver Nuggets with 21 points, 11 rebounds, and 10 assists.

=== Chicago Bulls (2009–2010) ===
Salmons and Brad Miller were traded to the Chicago Bulls on February 18, 2009, in exchange for Cedric Simmons, Drew Gooden, Andrés Nocioni, and Michael Ruffin. In 2009, Salmons proved to be a key contributor, helping lead the Bulls to the 2009 NBA Playoffs. In Chicago, he continued to average over 18 points per game for the season. Salmons also logged a whopping 44.7 minutes per game in the playoffs, in part because there were a combined seven overtime periods in the Bulls' first round series against the Boston Celtics. The Bulls were eventually eliminated in game seven of that series.

=== Milwaukee Bucks (2010–2011) ===
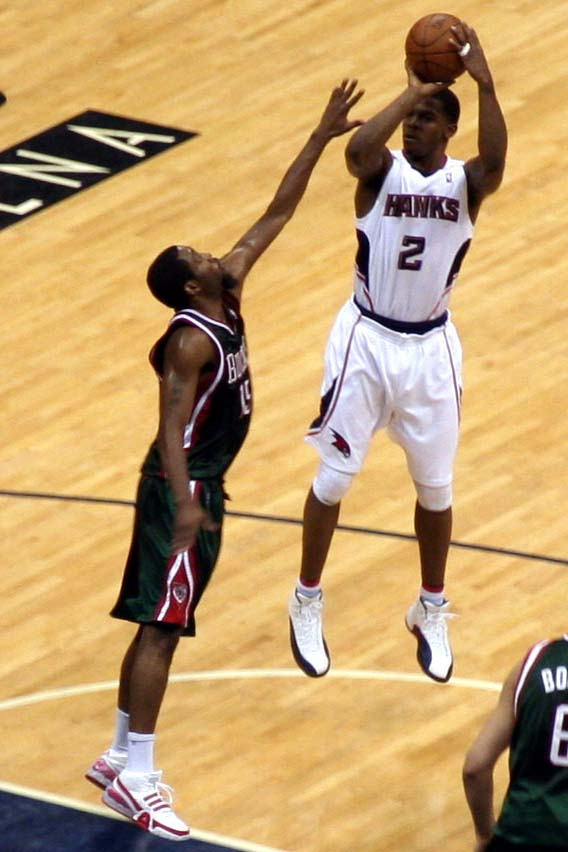
Salmons with the Milwaukee Bucks, guarding Joe Johnson of the Atlanta Hawks in February 2010

On February 18, 2010, Salmons was traded to the Milwaukee Bucks for Hakim Warrick, Joe Alexander, and the Bulls' second-round picks in 2011 and 2012, with the Bucks given the option to swap first-round picks, provided it is not a top 10 pick, in the 2010 NBA draft. In Milwaukee, Salmons averaged nearly 20 points per game for the Bucks after his acquisition. He opted out of his final year of his contract but then signed a five-year deal to stay with the Bucks.

=== Return to Sacramento (2011–2013) ===
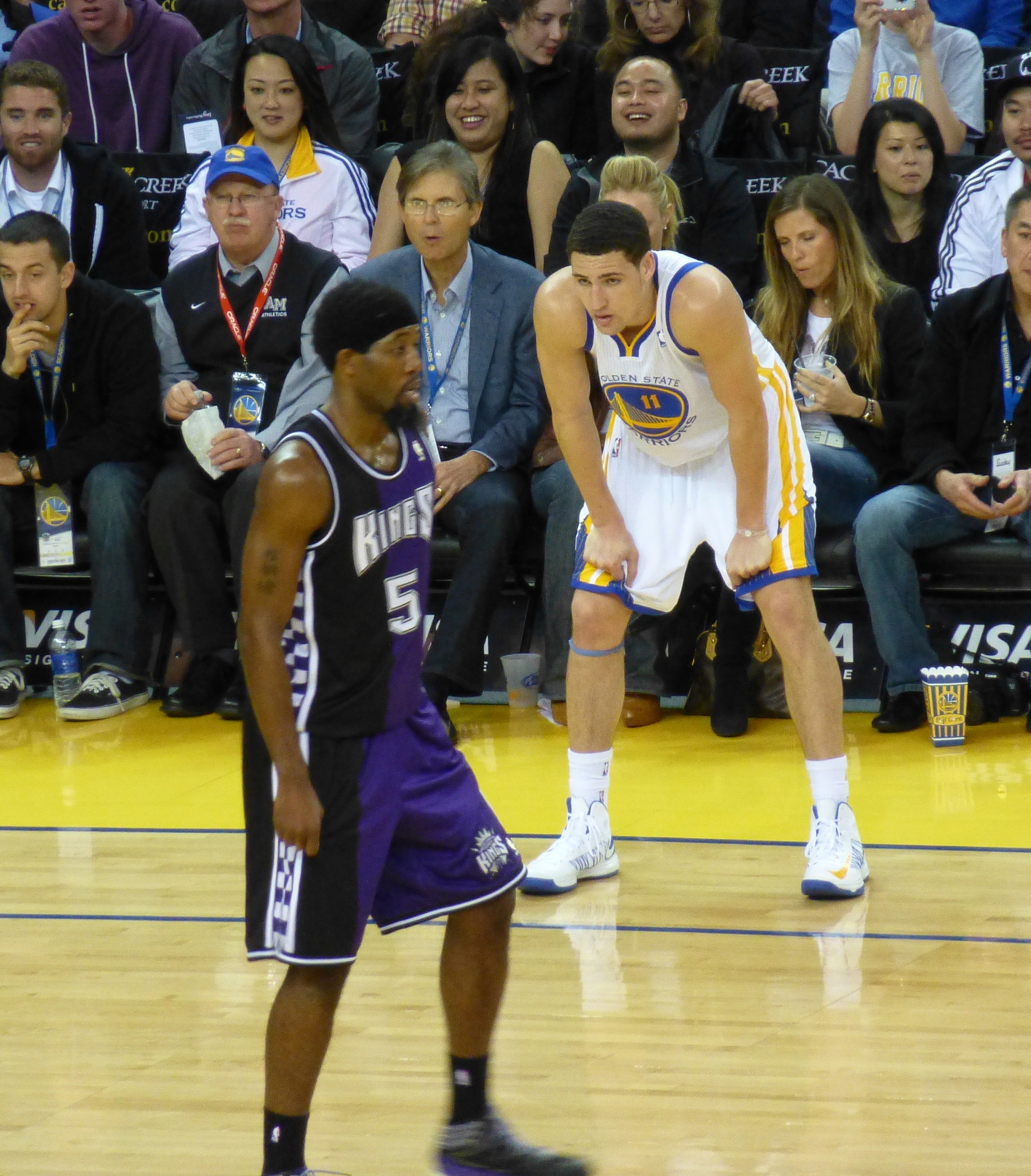
Salmons with the Sacramento Kings in March 2013

On June 23, 2011, he was traded back to the Sacramento Kings as part of a three-way deal including the Milwaukee Bucks and Charlotte Bobcats. The Kings received Jimmer Fredette in the transaction.

=== Toronto Raptors (2013–2014) ===
On December 9, 2013, the Kings traded Salmons, Greivis Vásquez, Patrick Patterson, and Chuck Hayes to the Toronto Raptors for Rudy Gay, Quincy Acy, and Aaron Gray.

On June 30, 2014, Salmons was traded, along with a 2015 second-round pick, to the Atlanta Hawks in exchange for Louis Williams and the draft rights to Lucas Nogueira. On July 10, 2014, he was waived by the Hawks.

=== New Orleans Pelicans (2014–2015) ===
On August 26, 2014, Salmons signed with the New Orleans Pelicans.

In Salmons' final NBA game on February 2, 2015, a 115–100 win over the Atlanta Hawks, he played for only 7 1/2 minutes and recorded no points and only one assist.

On February 19, 2015, Salmons was traded to the Phoenix Suns as a part of a three-team deal with the Miami Heat. Later that month, Salmons and Kendall Marshall were both waived.

== NBA career statistics ==
Legend
GP	Games played	GS	Games started	MPG	Minutes per game
FG%	Field goal percentage	3P%	3-point field goal percentage	FT%	Free throw percentage
RPG	Rebounds per game	APG	Assists per game	SPG	Steals per game
BPG	Blocks per game	PPG	Points per game	**Bold**	Career high
*	Led the league

=== Regular season ===
Year	Team	GP	GS	MPG	FG%	3P%	FT%	RPG	APG	SPG	BPG	PPG
2002–03	Philadelphia	64	1	7.9	.414	.323	.743	.9	.7	.3	.1	2.1
2003–04	Philadelphia	77	24	20.8	.387	.340	.772	2.5	1.7	.8	.2	5.8
2004–05	Philadelphia	58	8	17.1	.405	.341	.729	2.1	2.0	.7	.2	4.1
2005–06	Philadelphia	**82***	24	25.1	.420	.299	.775	2.7	2.7	.9	.2	7.5
2006–07	Sacramento	79	19	27.0	.456	.357	.779	3.3	3.2	.9	.3	8.5
2007–08	Sacramento	81	41	31.1	**.477**	.325	.823	**4.3**	2.6	1.1	.4	12.5
2008–09	Sacramento	53	53	37.4	.472	**.418**	.823	4.2	**3.7**	1.1	.2	18.3
2008–09	Chicago	26	21	**37.7**	.473	.415	.843	**4.3**	2.0	1.0	**.6**	18.3
2009–10	Chicago	51	28	33.2	.420	.380	.789	3.4	2.5	**1.3**	.4	12.7
2009–10	Milwaukee	30	28	37.6	.467	.385	.867	3.2	3.3	1.1	.1	**19.9**
2010–11	Milwaukee	73	70	35.0	.415	.379	.813	3.6	3.5	1.0	.4	14.0
2011–12	Sacramento	46	32	27.2	.409	.295	.644	2.9	2.0	.8	.2	7.5
2012–13	Sacramento	76	**72**	30.0	.399	.371	.773	2.7	3.0	.7	.3	8.8
2013–14	Sacramento	18	8	24.7	.350	.381	**1.000**	2.6	2.4	.7	.4	5.8
2013–14	Toronto	60	0	21.4	.368	.388	.733	2.0	1.7	.6	.2	5.0
2014–15	New Orleans	21	0	12.9	.333	.308	.500	1.0	.6	.4	.2	2.0
Career		895	429	26.4	.431	.366	.799	2.9	2.4	.8	.3	9.3

=== Playoffs ===
Year	Team	GP	GS	MPG	FG%	3P%	FT%	RPG	APG	SPG	BPG	PPG
2003	Philadelphia	6	0	2.7	.000	.000	.000	.5	.0	.0	.0	.0
2005	Philadelphia	2	0	2.0	.000	.000	.000	.0	.5	.0	.0	.0
2009	Chicago	**7**	**7**	**44.7**	.402	**.316**	.853	**4.4**	2.3	1.3	**1.0**	**18.1**
2010	Milwaukee	**7**	**7**	40.7	**.404**	.174	.964	3.7	**4.0**	**1.4**	.6	17.0
2014	Toronto	6	0	12.8	.294	.167	**1.000**	1.0	.8	.3	.0	2.2
Career		28	14	24.8	.393	.243	.877	2.4	1.8	.8	.4	9.3

== Personal life ==
Salmons is a Christian. He has spoken on behalf of the Fellowship of Christian Athletes. In 2018, Salmons was inducted into his alma mater's Sports Hall of Fame.
