= Corey Maggette =

American basketball player (born 1979)

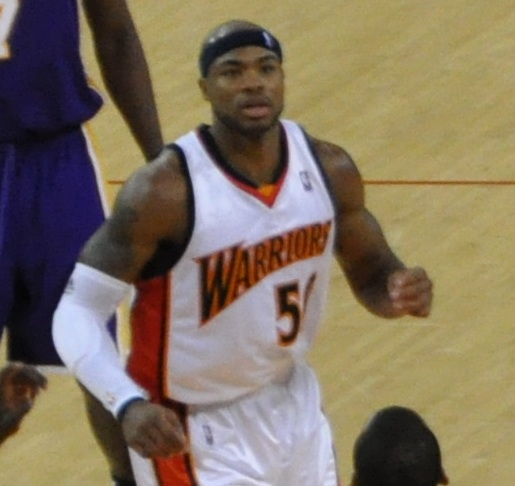
- Maggette with the Golden State Warriors in 2009

Personal information
- Born: November 12, 1979 (age 47) Melrose Park, Illinois, U.S.
- Listed height: 6 ft 6 in (1.98 m)
- Listed weight: 225 lb (102 kg)

Career information
- High school: Fenwick (Oak Park, Illinois)
- College: Duke (1998–1999)
- NBA draft: 1999: 1st round, 13th overall pick
- Drafted by: Seattle SuperSonics
- Playing career: 1999–2013
- Position: Small forward / shooting guard
- Number: 5, 50

Career history
- 1999–2000: Orlando Magic
- 2000–2008: Los Angeles Clippers
- 2008–2010: Golden State Warriors
- 2010–2011: Milwaukee Bucks
- 2011–2012: Charlotte Bobcats
- 2012–2013: Detroit Pistons

Career highlights
- ACC All-Rookie Team (1999); 2× Second-team Parade All-American (1997, 1998); McDonald's All-American (1998)

Career NBA statistics
- Points: 13,198 (16.0 ppg)
- Rebounds: 4,022 (4.9 rpg)
- Assists: 1,696 (2.1 apg)
- Stats at NBA.com
- Stats at Basketball Reference

Corey Antoine Maggette (/məˈɡɛti/; born November 12, 1979) is an American former professional basketball player. He played college basketball for Duke University and professional basketball in the NBA for 14 seasons.

Born in Melrose Park, Illinois, Maggette was a nationally recognized basketball player at Fenwick High School, a three-time Parade All-American and 1998 Gatorade National Player of the Year. In one season with the Duke Blue Devils, Maggette was named to the Atlantic Coast Conference All-Rookie team and helped Duke finish as 1999 NCAA national runners-up.

In the 1999 NBA draft, Maggette was selected 13th overall by the Seattle SuperSonics. He played 14 seasons in the NBA from 1999 to 2013, beginning with the Orlando Magic as a rookie followed by longer stints with the Los Angeles Clippers from 2000 to 2008 and Golden State Warriors from 2008 to 2010. He played for three different teams in his last three seasons, the Milwaukee Bucks, Charlotte Bobcats, and Detroit Pistons.

Beginning in 2014, Maggette became a basketball commentator on television, as an analyst for Fox Sports West coverage of Clippers games.

== High school and college career ==
Maggette excelled at Fenwick High School in Oak Park, Illinois. He earned three Parade All-American honors in high school. In 1998, he won the Gatorade National Player of the Year award in boys' basketball after a senior season at Fenwick averaging 25 points and 12 rebounds on a 27–4 team.

Maggette, a 6 ft 6 in (1.98 m), 225 lb (102 kg; 16.1 st) small forward, played college basketball at Duke University, where as a freshman in 1998–99, he averaged 10.6 points and 3.9 rebounds per game and was named to the ACC All-Rookie Team. Along with Duke teammates Elton Brand and William Avery, he is notable for being one of the first Duke players to leave before the end of his athletic eligibility during the tenure of coach Mike Krzyzewski.

In July 2000, Maggette signed a sworn statement that as a high schooler, he accepted $2,000 from his Amateur Athletic Union summer league coach Myron Piggie, a move that put his eligibility at Duke in question. In 2004, the NCAA decided not to punish Duke because they were found to have been unaware about Maggette's eligibility issue while at Duke.

== NBA career ==
=== Orlando Magic (1999–2000) ===
Maggette was selected with the 13th overall pick in the 1999 NBA draft by the Seattle SuperSonics but was later traded to the Orlando Magic on draft night along with Dale Ellis, Don MacLean, and Billy Owens for Horace Grant and 2nd round draft picks from the 2000 and 2001 drafts. Maggette was the only player retained by the Magic from the trade. As a rookie in 1999–2000, he averaged 8.4 points and 3.9 rebounds over 77 games and scored a season-high 20 points on January 3 against the Detroit Pistons.

=== Los Angeles Clippers (2000–2008) ===
On June 28, 2000, Maggette was traded, along with Keyon Dooling, Derek Strong, and cash considerations, to the Los Angeles Clippers in exchange for a 2006 first-round pick. During his career with the Clippers, Maggette, whose teammates nicknamed him "Maximus," established himself as a solid forward and developed into a perennial 15+ per game scorer. He became known for excellent jumping ability as well as his propensity to create contact and get to the free throw line – he was consistently among the league leaders in free throws attempted and made. Maggette participated in the Slam Dunk Contest at the 2001 NBA All-Star Weekend and experienced a good year in 2004–05, touting career-highs in points, rebounds, assists and free throw percentage. Bothered by a nagging foot injury, he sat out much of the 2005–06 season. On April 22, 2006, Maggette and his teammates helped the Clippers win their first NBA playoff game in 13 years by defeating the Denver Nuggets in Game 1 of their first-round match-up. Two days later, the team won their second playoff game, going 2–0 against an opponent for the first time in franchise history. On May 1, 2006, they defeated the Nuggets in Game 5 and, as a result, their first playoff series since they moved from Buffalo. In the Western Conference semifinals, the Clippers faced the Phoenix Suns and lost in seven games. In a series-saving 118–106 Game 6 win over the Suns, Maggette came off the bench to score 25 points while shooting 7-of-8 shooting from the field and 9-of-9 from the free throw line – the best playoff performance of his career.

Maggette returned strongly during the 2006–07 season despite an alleged feud with coach Mike Dunleavy. Maggette had a career-high night against the Los Angeles Lakers on April 12, 2007, scoring 39 points to secure a 118–110 victory after recovering from a 17-point deficit.

On June 30, 2008, Maggette opted out of the final year of his contract with the Clippers and officially became an unrestricted free agent.

=== Golden State Warriors (2008–2010) ===
On July 10, 2008, Maggette signed a five-year, $50 million contract with the Golden State Warriors. Upon signing with the Warriors, general manager Chris Mullin said of Maggette, "He gets his points and rebounds. But I just think it's his approach to the work and his lifestyle that will be a huge benefit for our young guys. They can watch him, see how he approaches it and maybe they can emulate him."

Playing a sixth man role for the Warriors, Maggette averaged 19.3 points and 5.4 rebounds in 121 games over two seasons for the franchise.

=== Milwaukee Bucks (2010–2011) ===
On June 22, 2010, Maggette was traded, along with a 2010 second-round pick, to the Milwaukee Bucks in exchange for Charlie Bell and Dan Gadzuric. On January 22, 2011, Maggette scored 12 points, grabbed 8 rebounds, and recorded a season-high 5 assists in a loss against the Memphis Grizzlies. On January 28, he recorded season-highs with 29 points and 11 rebounds in a 116–110 win over the Toronto Raptors.

=== Charlotte Bobcats (2011–2012) ===
On June 23, 2011, Maggette was traded to the Charlotte Bobcats as part of a three-team deal that also involved the Sacramento Kings. He appeared in 32 games for the Bobcats in the lockout-shortened season, scoring a season-high 29 points on March 6, 2012, against the Orlando Magic.

=== Detroit Pistons (2012–2013) ===
On June 26, 2012, Maggette was traded to the Detroit Pistons in exchange for Ben Gordon and a future first-round draft pick. After missing the first eight games of the 2012–13 season while nursing a calf injury suffered in preseason, Maggette made his Pistons debut on November 14, recording 9 points and 3 assists off the bench in a 94–76 win over the Philadelphia 76ers. He managed to play the next 17 games before being sitting out the rest of the season from mid-December onwards for personal reasons mixed with not being played by coach Lawrence Frank and citing his lack of interest in the game.

In a podcast interview in January 2026, former teammate Charlie Villanueva revealed that the reason Maggette's tenure with the Pistons came to an end was due to the fallout from an altercation he had with rookie teammate Kyle Singler during a practice. Villanueva claimed Maggette punched Singler and knocked him unconscious. The story was also corroborated by former Pistons teammate Andre Drummond.

Following the 2012–13 season, he became a free agent and subsequently signed a training camp deal with the San Antonio Spurs on September 30, 2013. However, he was later waived by the Spurs on October 15 after appearing in two preseason games. He later retired from basketball after 14 years in the NBA.

== Post-playing career ==
In October 2014, Maggette joined Fox Sports West and Prime Ticket as an analyst for the Los Angeles Clippers. He later joined Fox Sports 1 as a college basketball analyst.

In 2017, Maggette joined the BIG3 team Power for their inaugural season which ended with him suffering a torn achilles in his team's opening game. In August 2018, Maggette was named 2018 BIG3 MVP and Captain of the Year after leading the Power to a 7–1 regular season record. Led by Naismith Memorial Basketball Hall of Famer Nancy Lieberman as coach and league MVP Maggette's 27 points, team Power won the championship game 51–43. In May 2019, Maggette returned to the BIG3 to defend his team's championship, his MVP status and his team's health.

== Media appearances ==
Maggette was among 16 players appearing in the season 2 finale of The Apprentice in 2004. In that episode, contestant Jennifer Massey organized a charity basketball game featuring that group of players.

In 2005, Maggette guest starred as himself in the Half & Half episode "The Big Frozen Assets Episode".

In 2007, Maggette made a brief guest appearance in the music video for Common's "Drivin' Me Wild".

== Personal life ==
In 2012, Maggette married Milli Martinez, a former Georgia Tech basketball player.

== NBA career statistics ==
Legend
GP	Games played	GS	Games started	MPG	Minutes per game
FG%	Field goal percentage	3P%	3-point field goal percentage	FT%	Free throw percentage
RPG	Rebounds per game	APG	Assists per game	SPG	Steals per game
BPG	Blocks per game	PPG	Points per game	**Bold**	Career high

=== Regular season ===
Year	Team	GP	GS	MPG	FG%	3P%	FT%	RPG	APG	SPG	BPG	PPG
1999–00	Orlando	**77**	5	17.8	.478	.182	.751	3.9	.8	.3	**.3**	8.4
2000–01	L.A. Clippers	69	9	19.7	.462	.304	.774	4.2	1.2	.5	.1	10.0
2001–02	L.A. Clippers	63	52	25.6	.443	.331	.801	3.7	1.8	.7	**.3**	11.4
2002–03	L.A. Clippers	64	57	31.3	.444	.350	.802	5.0	1.9	.9	**.3**	16.8
2003–04	L.A. Clippers	73	**72**	36.0	.447	.329	.848	5.9	3.1	.9	.2	20.7
2004–05	L.A. Clippers	66	60	**36.9**	.431	.304	**.857**	**6.0**	**3.4**	**1.1**	.1	**22.2**
2005–06	L.A. Clippers	32	13	29.5	.445	.338	.828	5.3	2.1	.6	.1	17.8
2006–07	L.A. Clippers	75	31	30.5	.454	.200	.820	5.9	2.8	.9	.2	16.9
2007–08	L.A. Clippers	70	65	35.7	.458	**.384**	.812	5.6	2.7	1.0	.1	22.1
2008–09	Golden State	51	19	31.1	.461	.253	.824	5.5	1.8	.9	.2	18.6
2009–10	Golden State	70	49	29.7	**.516**	.260	.835	5.3	2.5	.7	.1	19.8
2010–11	Milwaukee	67	18	20.9	.453	.359	.834	3.6	1.3	.3	.1	12.0
2011–12	Charlotte	32	28	27.5	.373	.364	.856	3.9	1.2	.7	.0	15.0
2012–13	Detroit	18	0	14.3	.355	.238	.750	1.4	1.1	.3	.1	5.3
Career		827	478	28.2	.453	.324	.822	4.9	2.1	.7	.2	16.0

=== Playoffs ===
Year	Team	GP	GS	MPG	FG%	3P%	FT%	RPG	APG	SPG	BPG	PPG
2006	L.A. Clippers	12	2	24.3	.467	.333	.910	7.3	1.4	.6	.4	15.3
Career		12	2	24.3	.467	.333	.910	7.3	1.4	.6	.4	15.3
