= Mavericks–Rockets rivalry =

National Basketball Association cross-state rivalry in Texas

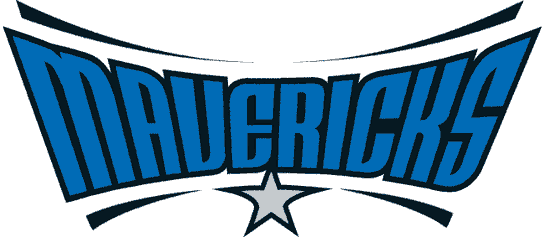
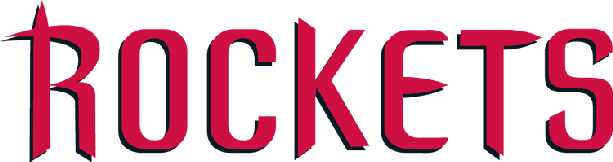
- Dallas Mavericks Houston Rockets
- First meeting: October 29, 1980; Rockets 109, Mavericks 103
- Latest meeting: October 30, 2026; Mavericks 116, Rockets 111
- Next meeting: January 1, 2027

Statistics
- Total meetings: 223
- All-time series: 116–107 (HOU)
- Regular season series: 108–99 (HOU)
- Postseason results: 8–8 (tied)
- Longest win streak: HOU W10
- Current win streak: DAL W1

Postseason history
- 1988 Western Conference First Round: Mavericks won, 3–1; 2005 Western Conference First Round: Mavericks won, 4–3; 2015 Western Conference First Round : Rockets won, 4–1

The Mavericks–Rockets rivalry also known as the Battle of Texas, and the I-45 Rivalry is a National Basketball Association (NBA) rivalry between the Dallas Mavericks and the Houston Rockets.

As of the end of the 2026 NBA season, the Rockets lead the regular season series, 107–98. The two teams have met three times in the playoffs, with the Mavericks holding a 2–1 series record.

== History ==
The Mavericks played their inaugural season in 1980, joining the Rockets in Texas, who had moved to Houston in the 1972 NBA season. Both teams joined the San Antonio Spurs as the three NBA teams in Texas. The teams first faced each other on October 29, 1980. Houston won the first matchup 109-103.

The teams first met in the playoffs in 1988 in the first round. The Mavericks, the third seed, defeated the Rockets, the sixth seed, in five games.

On April 11, 1995, the Mavericks defeated the Rockets 156–147 in double overtime. Two years later, the Rockets and Mavericks played the first-ever regular season game played in Mexico City, which was won by the Rockets 108–106.

In 2005, the teams would meet again in the postseason. Houston, the fifth seed, took a 2-0 series lead over the fourth seeded Mavericks, but lost the series in seven games.

During the 2013 NBA Playoffs, then Mavericks owner Mark Cuban and Rockets general manager Daryl Morey exchanged posts on Twitter. In the 2014 offseason former Rockets forward Chandler Parsons signed an offer sheet to leave the Rockets to for the Mavericks for $46 million, while making negative statements about the city of Houston upon leaving.

Both teams met in the first round of the 2015 NBA playoffs, with the Rockets as the second seed and Mavericks the seventh seed, with Rockets winning the series in five games.

Both teams met in the inaugural 2023 NBA In-Season Tournament, which was held during the regular season, in West Group B, where the Mavericks defeated the Rockets 121–115 on November 28, 2023. Both teams finished the group stage 2–2, ending up in a three-way tie with the Denver Nuggets for second place. Because the teams were tied on group head-to-head results, overall point differential was used as the tiebreaker; the Rockets placed second behind the group winner New Orleans Pelicans, followed by the Mavericks and Nuggets.

Both teams faced each other in the 2026 NBA Cup under West Group A. The Mavericks won that game 116–111, handing the Rockets their first loss of the 2026–27 regular season after Houston started it with five consecutive wins.

== Season-by-season results ==
Dallas Mavericks vs. Houston Rockets Season-by-Season Results
1980s (Rockets, 34–29)

Season	Season series		at Dallas Mavericks	at Houston Rockets	Overall series	Notes
1980–81	Rockets	6–0	Rockets, 3–0	Rockets, 3–0	Rockets; 6–0	Dallas Mavericks join the NBA as an expansion team and are placed in the Midwest Division. Houston Rockets move from the Eastern Conference to the Western Conference and are placed in the Midwest Division alongside the Mavericks. On February 4, 1981, Rockets beat the Mavericks 116–68, their largest victory against the Mavericks with a 48-point differential. Rockets lose 1981 NBA Finals.
1981–82	Rockets	4–2	Mavericks, 2–1	Rockets, 3–0	Rockets; 10–2	
1982–83	Mavericks	5–1	Mavericks, 2–1	Mavericks, 3–0	Rockets; 11–7	
1983–84	Mavericks	4–2	Mavericks, 3–0	Rockets, 2–1	Rockets; 13–11	
1984–85	Rockets	4–2	Rockets, 2–1	Rockets, 2–1	Rockets; 17–13	
1985–86	Rockets	5–1	Rockets, 2–1	Rockets, 3–0	Rockets; 22–14	Rockets win the Midwest Division for the first time. Rockets lose 1986 NBA Finals.
1986–87	Tie	3–3	Mavericks, 3–0	Rockets, 3–0	Rockets; 25–17	Mavericks win the Midwest Division for the first time.
1987–88	Mavericks	4–2	Mavericks, 2–1	Mavericks, 2–1	Rockets; 27–21	
1988 Western Conference First Round	Mavericks	3–1	Tie, 1–1	Mavericks, 2–0	Rockets; 28–24	1st postseason series.
1988–89	Rockets	5–1	Rockets, 3–0	Rockets, 2–1	Rockets; 33–25	
1989–90	Mavericks	4–1	Mavericks, 2–0	Mavericks, 2–1	Rockets; 34–29	

1990s (Rockets, 32–13)

Season	Season series		at Dallas Mavericks	at Houston Rockets	Overall series	Notes
1990–91	Rockets	3–1	Tie, 1–1	Rockets, 2–0	Rockets; 37–30	
1991–92	Mavericks	4–2	Mavericks, 2–1	Mavericks, 2–1	Rockets; 39–34	
1992–93	Rockets	4–1	Rockets, 3–0	Tie, 1–1	Rockets; 43–35	Rockets win the Midwest Division.
1993–94	Rockets	4–1	Rockets, 2–1	Rockets, 2–0	Rockets; 47–36	Rockets win the Midwest Division. Rockets win 1994 NBA Finals, their first NBA championship.
1994–95	Rockets	3–2	Tie, 1–1	Rockets, 2–1	Rockets; 50–38	On April 11, 1995, at Houston, Mavericks beat the Rockets 156–147 in double overtime, their most points scored in a game against the Rockets and their most points scored in a game overall as a franchise. Rockets win 1995 NBA Finals.
1995–96	Rockets	3–1	Tie, 1–1	Rockets, 2–0	Rockets; 53–39	
1996–97	Rockets	4–0	Rockets, 2–0	Rockets, 2–0	Rockets; 57–39	
1997–98	Rockets	4–0	Rockets, 2–0	Rockets, 2–0	Rockets; 61–39	Compaq renamed Rocket's home stadium The Summit to Compaq Center. On December 7, 1997, Rockets beat the Mavericks 108–106 at Palacio de los Deportes in Mexico City, Mexico. The game is accounted for as a Dallas home game.
1998–99	Tie	2–2	Rockets, 2–0	Mavericks, 2–0	Rockets; 63–41	Rockets win 11 games in a row against the Mavericks. First time away team sweeps the season series.
1999–2000	Rockets	3–1	Tie, 1–1	Rockets, 2–0	Rockets; 66–42	

2000s (Mavericks, 31–16)

Season	Season series		at Dallas Mavericks	at Houston Rockets	Overall series	Notes
2000–01	Tie	2–2	Tie, 1–1	Tie, 1–1	Rockets; 68–44	First time both teams split the season series. Last season Mavericks played at Reunion Arena.
2001–02	Tie	2–2	Tie, 1–1	Tie, 1–1	Rockets; 70–46	Mavericks open up American Airlines Center.
2002–03	Mavericks	4–0	Mavericks, 2–0	Mavericks, 2–0	Rockets; 70–50	Mavericks sweep the Rockets in the season series for the first time. Mavericks win the season series and finish with a winning record at home for the first time since the 1991 season. Last season Rockets played at Compaq Center (formerly known as The Summit).
2003–04	Mavericks	3–1	Mavericks, 2–0	Tie, 1–1	Rockets; 71–53	Rockets open up Toyota Center.
2004–05	Tie	2–2	Tie, 1–1	Tie, 1–1	Rockets; 73–55	As part of new realignments, Mavericks and Rockets move to the new Southwest Division.
2005 Western Conference First Round	Mavericks	4–3	Tie, 2–2	Mavericks, 2–1	Rockets; 76–59	2nd postseason series. Mavericks come back from 0–2 to win the series. In Game 7 at Dallas, Mavericks beat the Rockets 116–76, their largest victory against the Rockets with a 40-point differential.
2005–06	Mavericks	4–0	Mavericks, 2–0	Mavericks, 2–0	Rockets; 76–63	Mavericks lose 2006 NBA Finals.
2006–07	Mavericks	3–1	Mavericks, 2–0	Tie, 1–1	Rockets; 77–66	Mavericks win the Southwest Division for the first time. Mavericks finish with the best record in the league (67–15).
2007–08	Mavericks	3–1	Tie, 1–1	Mavericks, 2–0	Rockets; 78–69	
2008–09	Tie	2–2	Tie, 1–1	Tie, 1–1	Rockets; 80–71	
2009–10	Tie	2–2	Tie, 1–1	Tie, 1–1	Rockets; 82–73	Mavericks win the Southwest Division.

2010s (Rockets, 24–19)

Season	Season series		at Dallas Mavericks	at Houston Rockets	Overall series	Notes
2010–11	Mavericks	4–0	Mavericks, 2–0	Mavericks, 2–0	Rockets; 82–77	Mavericks win 2011 NBA Finals, their first NBA championship.
2011–12	Mavericks	3–0	Mavericks, 2–0	Mavericks, 1–0	Rockets; 82–80	
2012–13	Mavericks	3–1	Mavericks, 2–0	Tie, 1–1	Tie; 83–83	Mavericks win 9 games in a row against the Rockets.
2013–14	Tie	2–2	Tie, 1–1	Tie, 1–1	Tie; 85–85	
2014–15	Rockets	3–1	Tie, 1–1	Rockets, 2–0	Rockets; 88–86	Rockets win the season series and finish with a winning record at home against the Mavericks for the first time since the 1999 season. Rockets win the Southwest Division for the first time.
2015 Western Conference First Round	Rockets	4–1	Tie, 1–1	Rockets, 3–0	Rockets; 92–87	3rd postseason series.
2015–16	Tie	2–2	Tie, 1–1	Tie, 1–1	Rockets; 94–89	
2016–17	Rockets	4–0	Rockets, 2–0	Rockets, 2–0	Rockets; 98–89	Rockets finish with a winning record at Dallas for the first time since the 1998 season.
2017–18	Rockets	4–0	Rockets, 2–0	Rockets, 2–0	Rockets; 102–89	Rockets record their 100th win over the Mavericks. Rockets win the Southwest Division. Rockets finish with the best record in the league (65–17).
2018–19	Tie	2–2	Tie, 1–1	Tie, 1–1	Rockets; 104–91	Rockets win the Southwest Division. Luka Doncic joins the Mavericks.
2019–20	Rockets	2–1	Rockets, 1–0	Tie, 1–1	Rockets; 106–92	Due to the COVID-19 pandemic suspending the season, one of their games at Dallas was played in the 2020 NBA Bubble, while the other was canceled. On July 31, 2020, Rockets beat the Mavericks 153–149 in overtime, their most points scored in a game against the Mavericks. Rockets win the Southwest Division.

2020s (Mavericks, 15–8)

Season	Season series		at Dallas Mavericks	at Houston Rockets	Overall series	Notes
2020–21	Rockets	2–1	Rockets, 1–0	Tie, 1–1	Rockets; 108–93	Mavericks win the Southwest Division.
2021–22	Mavericks	4–0	Mavericks, 2–0	Mavericks, 2–0	Rockets; 108–97	Mavericks sweep the season series and finish with a winning record at Houston against the Rockets for the first time since the 2011 season.
2022–23	Mavericks	3–1	Tie, 1–1	Mavericks, 2–0	Rockets; 109–100	Mavericks record their 100th win over the Rockets.
2023–24	Mavericks	3–1	Mavericks, 2–0	Tie, 1–1	Rockets; 110–103	On November 28, 2023, at Dallas, the Mavericks beat the Rockets 121–115 during the 2023 NBA In-Season Tournament group stage. Mavericks win the Southwest Division. Mavericks lose 2024 NBA Finals.
2024–25	Rockets	3–1	Tie, 1–1	Rockets, 2–0	Rockets; 113–104	Final season for Luka Doncic as a Maverick. Rockets win the Southwest Division.
2025–26	Tie	2–2	Mavericks, 2–0	Rockets, 2–0	Rockets; 115–106	
2026–27	Tie	1-1	Mavericks, 1–0	Rockets, 1–0	Rockets; 116–107	On October 30, 2026, at Dallas, the Mavericks beat the Rockets 116–111 during the 2026 NBA Cup group stage.

Summary of Results

Season	Season series		at Dallas Mavericks	at Houston Rockets	Notes
Regular season games	Rockets	108–99	Mavericks, 56–46	Rockets, 62–43	
Postseason games	Tie	8–8	Tie, 4–4	Tie, 4–4	
Postseason series	Mavericks	2–1	Mavericks, 1–0	Tie, 1–1	Western Conference First Round: 1988, 2005, 2015
Regular and postseason	Rockets	116–107	Mavericks, 60–50	Rockets, 66–47	

== See also ==
- National Basketball Association rivalries
- Governor's Cup (NFL rivalry between Dallas Cowboys and Houston Texans)
- Lone Star Series (MLB rivalry between Houston Astros and Texas Rangers)
- Texas Derby (MLS rivalry between Houston Dynamo and FC Dallas)
