= Governor's Cup (Texas) =

National Football League cross-state rivalry and trophy in Texas

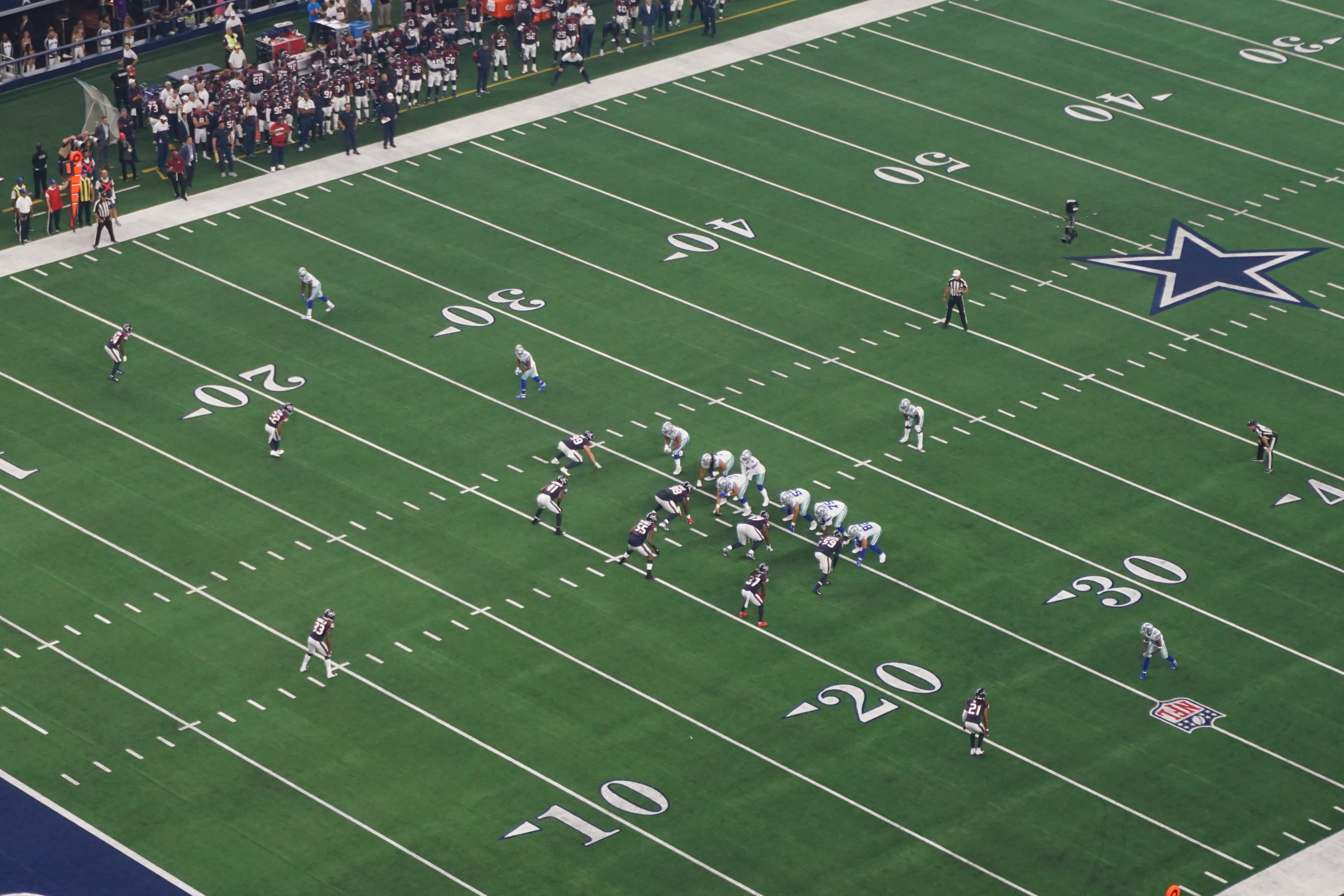
- Preseason game between the Houston Texans and Dallas Cowboys at AT&T Stadium on August 24, 2019

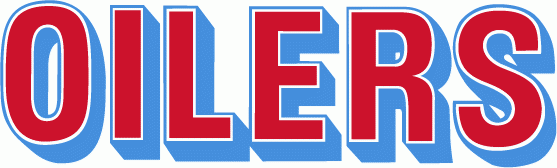
- Dallas Cowboys Houston Texans Houston Oilers
- Location: Dallas, Houston
- First meeting: October 16, 1960; Oilers 20, Texans 10
- Latest meeting: October 4, 2026; Cowboys 34, Texans 30
- Stadiums: Cowboys: AT&T Stadium; Texans: NRG Stadium

Statistics
- Total meetings: 23
- All-time series: Dallas: 14–9; Cowboys: 5–3 (Houston Texans); Cowboys: 5–3 (Oilers); Dallas Texans: 4–3 (Oilers)
- Postseason results: Dallas Texans: 1–0
- Largest victory: Dallas: 52–10 (1970); Houston: 38–7 (1961)
- Longest win streak: Dallas: 3 (2006–2014); Houston: 2 (1988–1991)
- Current win streak: Cowboys: 1 (2026–present)

Post-season history
- 1962 AFL Championship Game: Dallas Texans won: 20–17(2OT)

The Texas Governor's Cup, or Cowboys–Texans rivalry or Battle of Texas, also formerly known as the Oilers–Texans rivalry or Cowboys–Oilers rivalry, is the trophy awarded to the winner of the football game between the two National Football League (NFL) teams in Texas, currently the Dallas Cowboys and the Houston Texans.

The rivalry began during the inaugural 1960 season of the American Football League, featuring the Dallas Texans and Houston Oilers. Over the course of three seasons, both teams won three games each. They faced each other in the 1962 AFL Championship Game, where the Dallas Texans triumphed in double overtime. After that season, the Dallas Texans relocated to Kansas City, rebranding as the Kansas City Chiefs in the 1963 season, ending their in-state rivalry. The Houston Oilers did not encounter another Dallas team until the AFL–NFL merger, which placed the Oilers and Dallas Cowboys in the same league but in different conferences, leading to their first matchup in 1970. Throughout eight matchups, the Cowboys posted a 5–3 record against the Oilers, until the Oilers relocated to Nashville, Tennessee, in the 1997 season and rebranded as the Tennessee Titans. In the 2002 season, the NFL awarded a new franchise to Houston, resulting in the establishment of the Houston Texans. The inaugural game for the Houston Texans was played against the Cowboys, which they won. This development sparked the current Texas rivalry between the Cowboys and Texans, with the Cowboys holding a 5–3 record through eight meetings.

Dallas leads the overall series, 14–9.

== History ==
Since the first meeting between the Cowboys and Texans in 2002, the two teams have met in the regular season every four years, when all four NFC East teams play all four AFC South teams and every eight years at each team's home stadium, plus in 2024 when both teams won their divisions, and meet relatively often (by NFL standards) in the preseason; from 2002 until 2008 and again from 2013 to 2021 (except 2017 and 2020, which were canceled), the Cowboys and Texans have been scheduled to play each other in the preseason whenever they are not scheduled to meet in the regular season. In 2010, the teams played both a pre-season and regular season game while in 2009, 2011, and 2012 they did not meet at all. The 2017 preseason game, scheduled to be played in Houston, was canceled due to Hurricane Harvey. In 2018, the teams played both a pre-season and regular season game once again, marking the first time that this instance of two games in one year had happened since 2010.

The two cities of Houston and Dallas have a rivalry that goes way back before the team's founding. Until 2010, both were the two largest cities in Texas, with Dallas being known for having wealthy elites of the Texas oil and gas industry in the early 20th century, while Houston was known for being a working-class city with the lower-tier workers working in making oil pipelines during the Texas boom. In 2010 San Antonio – yet to ever have an NFL team – overtook Dallas to become Texas' second largest populated city. The US Census of 2020 has Houston with 2.3 million persons, the largest populated city in Texas, followed by San Antonio with 1.5 million people, then Dallas as Texas third largest city, with 1.4 million residents. The Houston and Dallas metropolitan areas remain far larger than San Antonio's, moreover, the Cowboys have not played in Dallas proper since 1971.

In 1960, the NFL established the Dallas Cowboys, mainly as an effort to cut off the American Football League (AFL)'s Dallas Texans: the cutoff effort was only a partial success, as the Texans relocated to become the Kansas City Chiefs in 1963, but the AFL itself would thrive and eventually merge into the NFL in 1970.

The AFL would be the first league to place a professional team in Houston, and though the Houston Oilers and the Texans were in opposite divisions, they quickly became rivals: this culminated in the double-overtime 1962 American Football League Championship Game that the Texans won to prevent an Oilers threepeat in the Texans' last game under that identity.

In 1965, the AFL's Houston Oilers and NFL's Dallas Cowboys both drafted Oklahoma tackle Ralph Neely. The Oilers sued the Cowboys over Neely's services. In the settlement of the case, the Oilers received three Cowboys draft picks in addition to a cash settlement. The Cowboys also agreed to play five preseason games, three in Houston, against the Oilers. Thus began the Governor's Cup series, a Texas tradition created by franchise free agency.

In 1992 the Cowboys and Oilers met twice in the preseason. The first game took place in Tokyo as part of the NFL's American Bowl series, and the second meeting in Dallas for the Governor's Cup.

The 1994 Governor's Cup was not actually played in Texas but in Mexico City at Estadio Azteca as part of the American Bowl series. As a result of Estadio Azteca's unusually large seating capacity, a league record 112,246 fans watched the Oilers shut out the Cowboys, 6–0 on August 15, 1994.

The Governor's Cup went into recess after the Oilers relocated to Nashville, Tennessee at the end of the 1996 season (being rebranded as the Tennessee Titans): this left the Cowboys as the only NFL team in Texas until the Texans entered the NFL as an expansion team in 2002.

The only other professional football league to feature teams from Dallas and Houston at the same time is the 2020 incarnation of the XFL, which established the Dallas Renegades and Houston Roughnecks.

In 2023, both teams won their respective divisions, resulting in a 2024 meeting due to the rotation of the fifth interconference game first played in 2021 pairing each NFC East team in a 2024 home game against the AFC South team with the same division placement in 2023.

== Season-by-season results ==
=== Oilers vs. Dallas Texans ===
Houston Oilers vs. Dallas Texans Season-by-Season Results
1960s (Texans, 4–3)

Season	Season series	at Houston Oilers	at Dallas Texans	Overall series	Notes
1960	Tie 1–1	Oilers; 20–10	Texans; 24–0	Tie; 1–1	Inaugural season for both franchises and the American Football League (AFL).
1961	Tie 1–1	Oilers; 38–7	Texans; 26–21	Tie; 2–2	In Houston, Houston recorded their largest victory against Dallas with a 31–point differential and scored their most points in a game against Dallas.
1962	Tie 1–1	Texans; 31–7	Oilers; 14–6	Tie; 3–3	
1962 Playoffs	Texans 1–0	Texans; 20–17(2OT)		Texans; 4–3	AFL Championship. First postseason matchup. Final matchup between Dallas and Houston in the AFL, as the Texans relocated to Kansas City the following season and renamed themselves to the Kansas City Chiefs. Oilers would not face another Dallas team until the 1970 NFL season, when the AFL–NFL merger united the Oilers and the Dallas Cowboys within the same league.

Summary of Results

Season	Season series	at Houston Oilers	at Dallas Texans	Notes
Regular season	Tie 3–3	Oilers 2–1	Texans 2–1	
Postseason	Texans 1–0	Texans 1–0		
Regular and postseason	Texans 4–3	Tie 2–2	Texans 2–1	

=== Cowboys vs. Oilers ===
Dallas Cowboys vs. Houston Oilers Season-by-Season Results
1970s (Cowboys, 2–1)

Season	Results	Location	Overall series	Notes
1970	Cowboys; 52–10	Cotton Bowl	Cowboys; 1–0	As a result of the AFL–NFL merger, the Oilers joined the National Football League (NFL) with the Cowboys but both are placed in different conferences. Oilers face a Dallas-based team for the first time since the 1962 season and the first meeting in the NFL between a Dallas and Houston team. Dallas record their largest victory against Houston with a 42–point differential and score their most points in a game against Houston.
1974	Cowboys; 10–0	Astrodome	Cowboys; 2–0	
1979	Oilers; 30–24	Texas Stadium	Cowboys; 2–1	Game was played on Thanksgiving.

1980s (Cowboys, 2–1)

Season	Results	Location	Overall series	Notes
1982	Cowboys; 37–7	Astrodome	Cowboys; 3–1	
1985	Cowboys; 17–10	Astrodome	Cowboys; 4–1	
1988	Oilers; 25–17	Texas Stadium	Cowboys; 4–2	Game was played on Thanksgiving.

1990s (Tie, 1–1)

Season	Results	Location	Overall series	Notes
1991	Oilers; 26–23(OT)	Astrodome	Cowboys; 4–3	
1994	Cowboys; 20–17	Texas Stadium	Cowboys; 5–3	Final meeting between the Cowboys and Oilers, as the Oilers would relocate to Tennessee in the 1997 season. The Cowboys would not face another Houston-based team until the 2002 season, in which the Houston Texans were added as an expansion team.

Summary of Results

Season	Season series	at Dallas Cowboys	at Houston Oilers	Notes
Regular season	Cowboys 5–3	Tie 2–2	Cowboys 3–1	

=== Cowboys vs. Houston Texans ===
Dallas Cowboys vs. Houston Texans Season-by-Season Results
2000s (Tie, 1–1)

Season	Results	Location	Overall series	Notes
2002	Texans; 19–10	Reliant Stadium	Texans; 1–0	Houston Texans join the NFL as an expansion team. They are placed in the American Football Conference (AFC). Texans' inaugural game as an NFL franchise.
2006	Cowboys; 34–6	Texas Stadium	Tie; 1–1	The only meeting at Texas Stadium, where the Cowboys recorded their largest margin of victory over the Texans with a 28-point differential.

2010s (Cowboys, 2–1)

Season	Results	Location	Overall series	Notes
2010	Cowboys; 27–13	Reliant Stadium	Cowboys; 2–1	
2014	Cowboys; 20–17(OT)	AT&T Stadium	Cowboys; 3–1	The first overtime game in the series.
2018	Texans; 19–16(OT)	NRG Stadium	Cowboys; 3–2	

2020s (Cowboys, 2–1)

Season	Results	Location	Overall series	Notes
2022	Cowboys; 27–23	AT&T Stadium	Cowboys; 4–2	
2024	Texans; 34–10	AT&T Stadium	Cowboys; 4–3	The Texans record their largest margin of victory in the series with a 24-point differential, as well as their first road win against the Cowboys. Houston's first road win against the Cowboys since the 1988 season.
2026	Cowboys; 34–30	Reliant Stadium	Cowboys; 5–3	Cowboys overcame a 16–6 halftime deficit and tie their most points scored against the Texans. Meanwhile, the Texans suffered from their first 0–4 start since 2020.

Summary of Results

Season	Season series	at Dallas Cowboys	at Houston Texans	Notes
Regular season	Cowboys 5–3	Cowboys 3–1	Tie 2–2	

== See also ==
- List of NFL rivalries
- Lone Star Series (MLB rivalry between Houston Astros and Texas Rangers)
- Mavericks–Rockets rivalry (NBA rivalry between Houston Rockets and Dallas Mavericks)
- Texas Derby (MLS rivalry between Houston Dynamo and FC Dallas)
