= List of 2014–15 NBA season transactions =

This is a list of all personnel changes for the 2014 NBA off-season and 2014–15 NBA season.

== Retirement ==
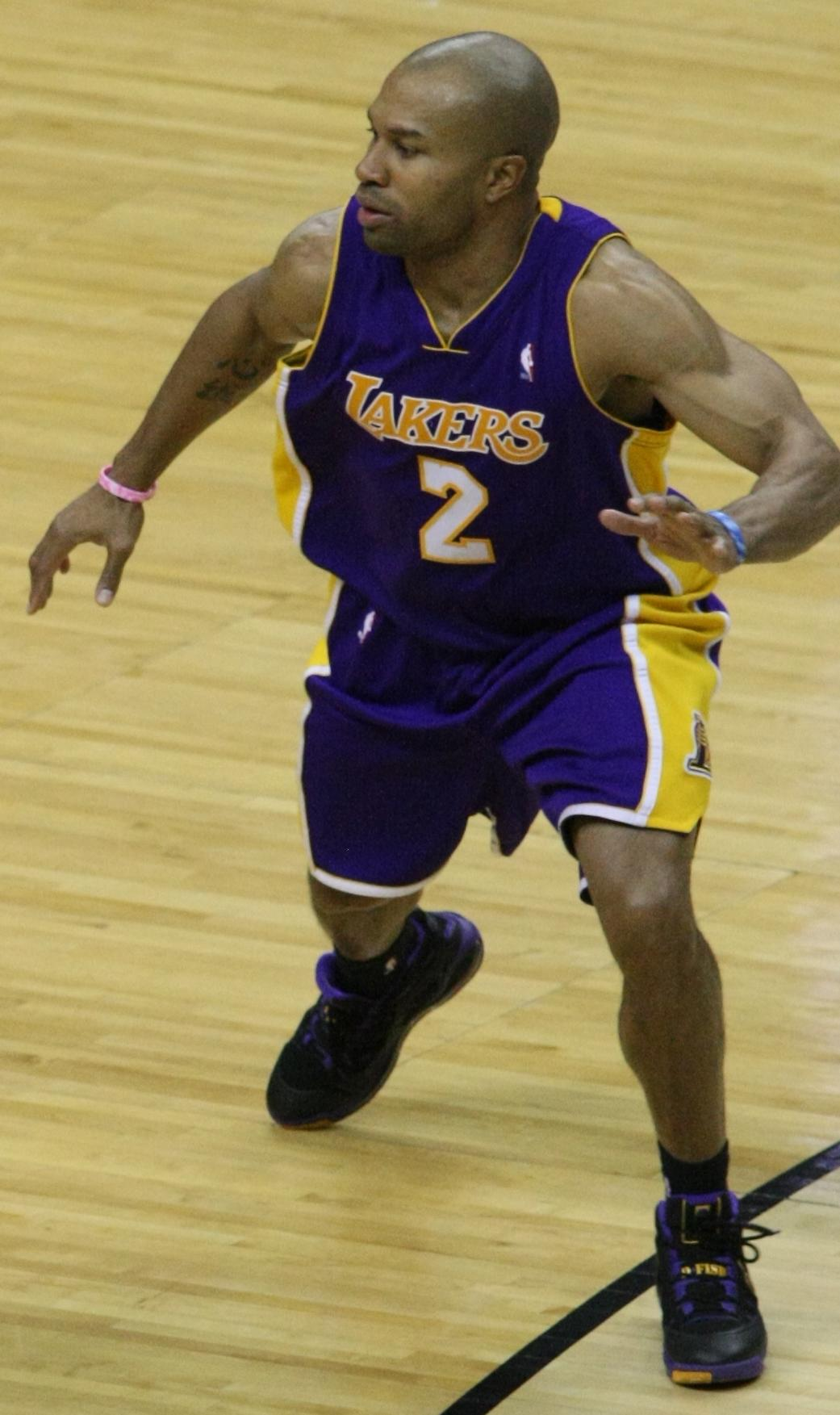
Derek Fisher with the Los Angeles Lakers.

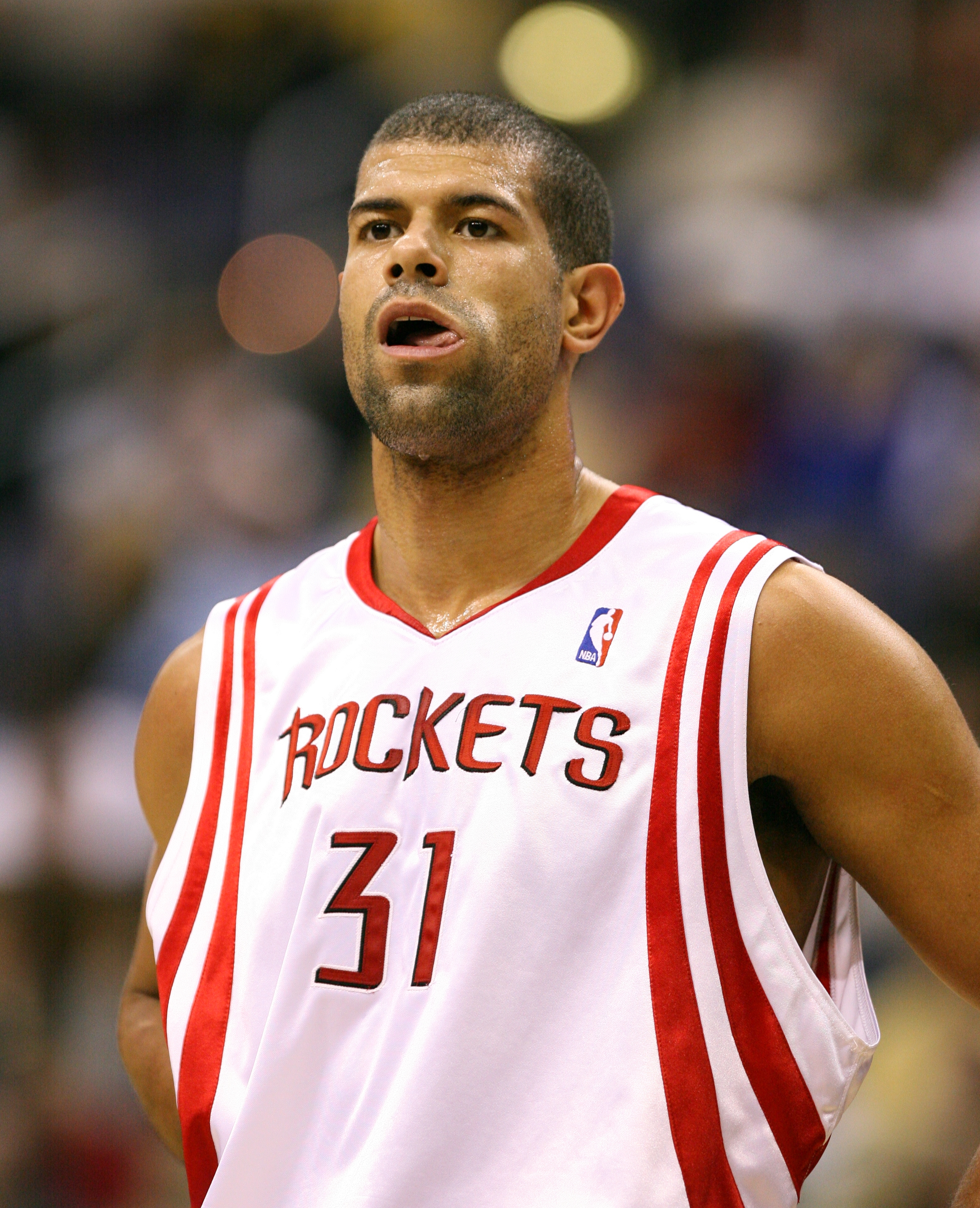
Shane Battier with the Houston Rockets.

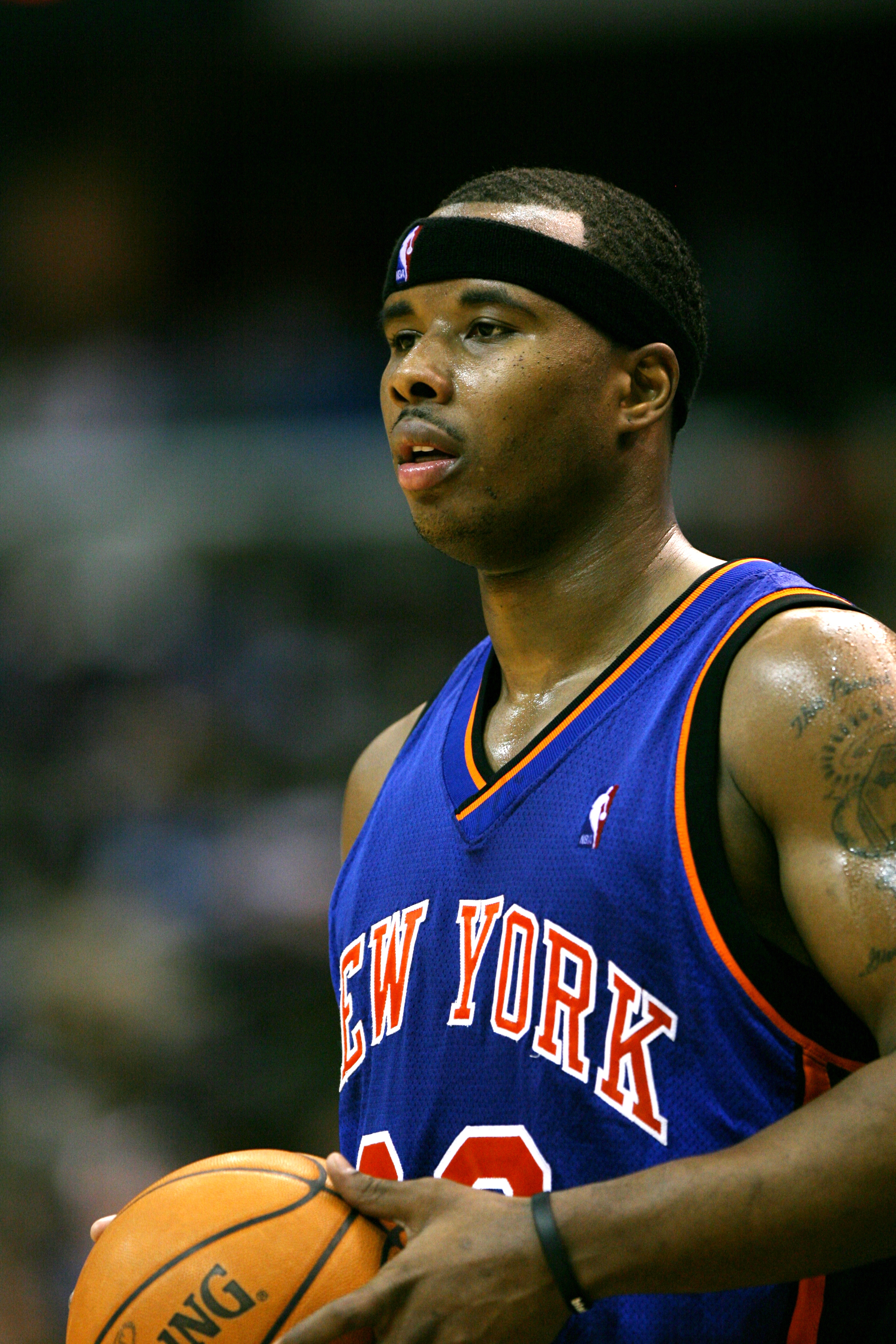
Quentin Richardson with the New York Knicks.

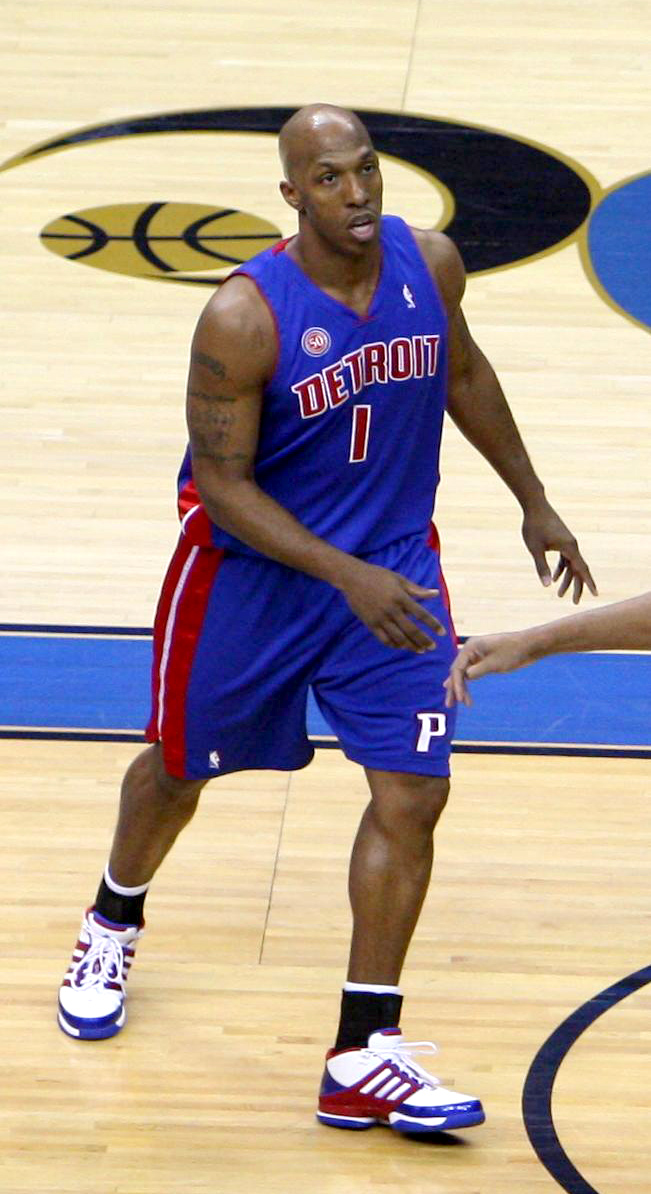
Chauncey Billups with the Detroit Pistons.

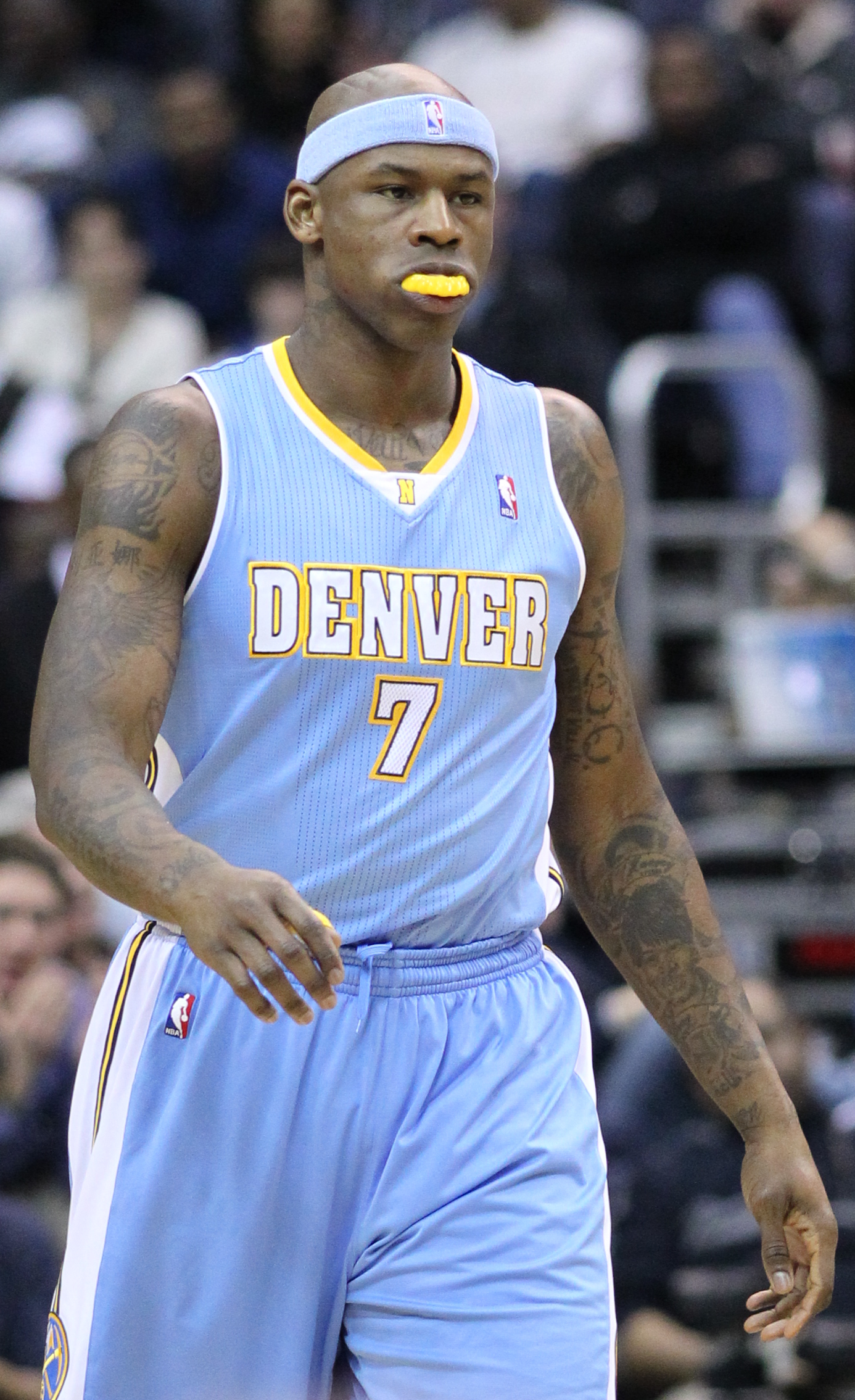
Al Harrington with the Denver Nuggets.

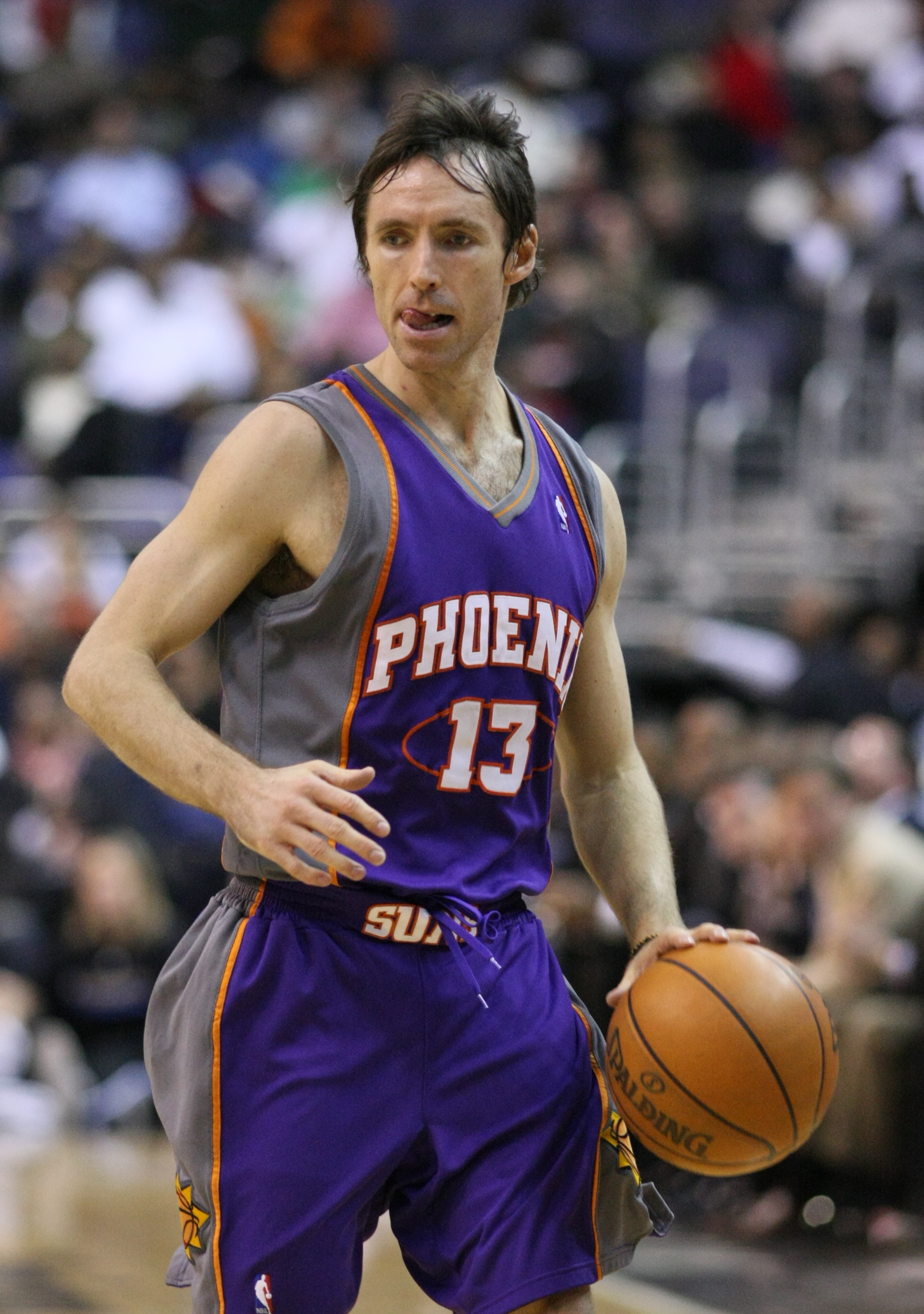
Steve Nash with the Phoenix Suns.

| Date | Name | Team(s) played (years) | Age | Notes | Ref. |
|---|---|---|---|---|---|
| June 9 | Travis Diener | Orlando Magic (2005–2007); Indiana Pacers (2007–2010); Portland Trail Blazers (2010) | 32 | Played in Italy for 4 seasons; was hired as director of player personnel for Marquette | |
| June 10 | Derek Fisher | Los Angeles Lakers (1996–2004; 2007–2012); Golden State Warriors (2004–2006); Utah Jazz (2006–2007); Oklahoma City Thunder (2012; 2013–2014); Dallas Mavericks (2012) | 39 | 5× NBA champion (2000–2002, 2009–2010); became head coach of the Knicks. | |
| June 15 | Shane Battier | Memphis Grizzlies (2001–2006; 2011); Houston Rockets (2006–2011); Miami Heat (2011–2014) | 35 | 2× NBA champion (2012–2013) | |
| August 7 | Quentin Richardson | Los Angeles Clippers (2000–2004); Phoenix Suns (2004–2005); New York Knicks (2005–2009; 2013); Miami Heat (2009–2010); Orlando Magic (2010–2012) | 34 | Won the 2005 NBA Three-Point Shootout; became the director of player development for the Pistons. | |
| August 7 | Malik Allen | Miami Heat (2001–2005); Charlotte Bobcats (2005); Chicago Bulls (2005–2007); New Jersey Nets (2007–2008); Dallas Mavericks (2008); Milwaukee Bucks (2008–2009); Dallas Mavericks (2009–2010); Orlando Magic (2010–2011) | 36 | Played for San Diego Wildfire of the ABA; became an assistant coach of the Pistons | |
| August 24 | Joel Przybilla | Milwaukee Bucks (2000–2004; 2012–2013); Atlanta Hawks (2004); Portland Trail Blazers (2004–2011; 2012); Charlotte Bobcats (2011) | 34 | | |
| September 9 | Chauncey Billups | Boston Celtics (1997–1998); Toronto Raptors (1998–1999); Denver Nuggets (1999–2000; 2008–2011); Minnesota Timberwolves (2000–2002); Detroit Pistons (2002–2008; 2013–2014); New York Knicks (2011); Los Angeles Clippers (2011–2013) | 37 | NBA champion (2004); NBA Finals MVP (2004); 5× NBA All-Star (2006–2010) | |
| September 10 | Ronald Dupree | Chicago Bulls (2004); Detroit Pistons (2004–2005; 2006–2007); Minnesota Timberwolves (2005–2006); Seattle SuperSonics (2008); Toronto Raptors (2010–2011) | 33 | Also spent time in Europe and the NBA D-League | |
| September 22 | Darko Miličić | Detroit Pistons (2003–2006); Orlando Magic (2006–2007); Memphis Grizzlies (2007–2009); New York Knicks (2009–2010); Minnesota Timberwolves (2010–2012); Boston Celtics (2012) | 29 | NBA champion (2004) | |
| September 29 | Royal Ivey | Atlanta Hawks (2004–2007); Milwaukee Bucks (2007–2008; 2010); Philadelphia 76ers (2008–2010; 2012–2013); Oklahoma City Thunder (2010–2012; 2014) | 32 | Also played for the Guangdong Southern Tigers of China; became assistant coach for D-League's Oklahoma City Blue | |
| October 2 | Earl Watson | Seattle SuperSonics / Oklahoma City Thunder (2001–2002; 2006–2009); Memphis Grizzlies (2002–2005); Denver Nuggets (2005–2006); Indiana Pacers (2009–2010); Utah Jazz (2010–2013); Portland Trail Blazers (2013–2014) | 35 | Was hired as an assistant coach for the Austin Toros. | |
| October 7 | Antawn Jamison | Golden State Warriors (1998–2003); Dallas Mavericks (2003–2004); Washington Wizards (2004–2010); Cleveland Cavaliers (2010–2012); Los Angeles Lakers (2012–2013); Los Angeles Clippers (2013–2014) | 38 | NBA Sixth Man of the Year (2004); became an analyst | |
| October 9 | Corey Maggette | Orlando Magic (1999–2000); Los Angeles Clippers (2000–2008); Golden State Warriors (2008–2010); Milwaukee Bucks (2010–2011); Charlotte Bobcats (2011–2012); Detroit Pistons (2012–2013) | 34 | Became an analyst for the Clippers | |
| November 11 | DeSagana Diop | Cleveland Cavaliers (2001–2005); Dallas Mavericks (2005–2008, 2008–2009); New Jersey Nets (2008); Charlotte Bobcats (2009–2013) | 32 | Was hired as a player development coach for the Texas Legends. | |
| November 19 | Jason Collins | New Jersey / Brooklyn Nets (2001–2008; 2014); Memphis Grizzlies (2008); Minnesota Timberwolves (2008–2009); Atlanta Hawks (2009–2012); Boston Celtics (2012–2013); Washington Wizards (2013) | 35 | First active male athlete from one of the four major North American sports leagues to publicly come out as gay | |
| February 25 | Larry Sanders | Milwaukee Bucks (2010–2015) | 26 | | |
| February 26 | Richard Hamilton | Washington Wizards (1999–2002); Detroit Pistons (2002–2011); Chicago Bulls (2011–2013) | 37 | NBA champion (2004) | |
| March 18 | Al Harrington | Indiana Pacers (1998–2004; 2006–2007); Atlanta Hawks (2004–2006); Golden State Warriors (2007–2008); New York Knicks (2008–2010); Denver Nuggets (2010–2012); Orlando Magic (2012–2013); Washington Wizards (2013–2014) | 35 | Also played for the Fujian Sturgeons of China in 2014 | |
| March 21 | Steve Nash | Phoenix Suns (1996–1998; 2004–2012); Dallas Mavericks (1998–2004); Los Angeles Lakers (2012–2015) | 41 | 2× NBA MVP (2005–2006); 8× NBA All-Star (2002–2003, 2005–2008, 2010, 2012) | |

== Front office movements ==
=== Head coach changes ===
==== Off-season ====
| Hire date | Team | Outgoing head coach | Reason for departure | Incoming head coach | Last coaching position | Ref. |
|---|---|---|---|---|---|---|
| May 14 | Detroit Pistons | John Loyer | Interim coach, contract not renewed | Stan Van Gundy | Orlando Magic head coach (2007–2012) | |
| May 19 | Golden State Warriors | Mark Jackson | Fired | Steve Kerr | None; Phoenix Suns general manager (2007–2010) | |
| June 6 | Minnesota Timberwolves | Rick Adelman | Retired | Flip Saunders | Washington Wizards head coach (2009–2012) | |
| June 6 | Utah Jazz | Tyrone Corbin | Contract not renewed | Quin Snyder | Atlanta Hawks assistant coach (2013–2014) | |
| June 10 | New York Knicks | Mike Woodson | Fired | Derek Fisher | None; Oklahoma City Thunder guard (2013–2014) | |
| June 20 | Cleveland Cavaliers | Mike Brown | Fired | David Blatt | Maccabi Tel Aviv head coach (2010–2014) | |
| July 1 | Milwaukee Bucks | Larry Drew | Fired | Jason Kidd | Brooklyn Nets head coach (2013–2014) | |
| July 2 | Brooklyn Nets | Jason Kidd | Traded | Lionel Hollins | Memphis Grizzlies head coach (2009–2013) | |
| July 28 | Los Angeles Lakers | Mike D'Antoni | Resigned | Byron Scott | Cleveland Cavaliers head coach (2010–2013) | |

==== Season ====
| Date | Team | Outgoing head coach | Reason for departure | Incoming head coach | Last coaching position | Ref. |
|---|---|---|---|---|---|---|
| December 15 | Sacramento Kings | Michael Malone | Fired | Tyrone Corbin (interim) | Sacramento Kings assistant coach (2014) | |
| February 5 | Orlando Magic | Jacque Vaughn | Fired | James Borrego (interim) | Orlando Magic assistant coach (2012–2015) | |
| February 12 | Sacramento Kings | Tyrone Corbin | Demoted | George Karl | Denver Nuggets head coach (2005–2013) | |
| March 3 | Denver Nuggets | Brian Shaw | Fired | Melvin Hunt (interim) | Denver Nuggets assistant coach (2010–2015) | |

=== General manager changes ===
Off-season

| Hire date | Team | Outgoing general manager | Reason for departure | Incoming general manager | Last managerial position | Ref. |
|---|---|---|---|---|---|---|
| June 3 | Detroit Pistons | Joe Dumars | Stepped down | Jeff Bower | New Orleans Hornets general manager (2005–2010) | |
| June 16 | Los Angeles Clippers | Gary Sacks | Demoted | Dave Wohl | Boston Celtics assistant general manager (2007–2009) | |

== Player movements ==
=== Trades ===
June
| June 25 | To Dallas Mavericks: Tyson Chandler; Raymond Felton | To New York Knicks: José Calderón; Samuel Dalembert; Wayne Ellington; Shane Larkin; Two 2014 second-round picks |
| June 26 (Draft-day trades) | To Denver Nuggets: Arron Afflalo | To Orlando Magic: Evan Fournier; Draft rights to 56th pick Roy Devyn Marble |
| June 26 (Draft-day trades) | To New York Knicks: Draft rights to 57th pick Louis Labeyrie | To Indiana Pacers: Cash considerations |
| June 26 (Draft-day trades) | To Los Angeles Lakers: Draft rights to 46th pick Jordan Clarkson | To Washington Wizards: Cash considerations |
| June 26 (Draft-day trades) | To Atlanta Hawks: Draft rights to 48th pick Lamar Patterson | To Milwaukee Bucks: 2015 Atlanta second-round pick |
| June 26 (Draft-day trades) | To Memphis Grizzlies: Draft rights to 35th pick Jarnell Stokes | To Utah Jazz: 2016 second-round pick |
| June 26 (Draft-day trades) | To Philadelphia 76ers: Draft rights to 12th pick Dario Šarić; 2015 Orlando second-round pick; Future first-round pick | To Orlando Magic: Draft rights to 10th pick Elfrid Payton |
| June 26 (Draft-day trades) | To Chicago Bulls: Draft rights to 11th pick Doug McDermott; Anthony Randolph | To Denver Nuggets: Draft rights to 16th pick Jusuf Nurkić; Draft rights to 19th pick Gary Harris; 2015 second-round pick (Note: The worse of Chicago's and Portland's picks) |
| June 26 (Draft-day trades) | To San Antonio Spurs: Draft rights to 54th pick Nemanja Dangubić | To Philadelphia 76ers: Draft rights to 58th pick Jordan McRae; Draft rights to 60th pick Cory Jefferson |
| June 26 (Draft-day trades) | To Houston Rockets: Draft rights to 53rd pick Alessandro Gentile | To Minnesota Timberwolves: Cash considerations |
| June 26 (Draft-day trades) | To Charlotte Hornets: Draft rights to 26th pick P. J. Hairston; Draft rights to 55th pick Semaj Christon; 2019 second-round pick; Cash considerations | To Miami Heat: Draft rights to 24th pick Shabazz Napier |
| June 26 (Draft-day trades) | To Oklahoma City Thunder: Draft rights to 55th pick Semaj Christon | To Charlotte Hornets: Cash considerations |
| June 26 (Draft-day trades) | To Brooklyn Nets: Draft rights to 44th pick Markel Brown | To Minnesota Timberwolves: Cash considerations |
| June 26 (Draft-day trades) | To Brooklyn Nets: Draft rights to 59th pick Xavier Thames | To Toronto Raptors: Cash considerations |
| June 26 (Draft-day trades) | To Brooklyn Nets: Draft rights to 60th pick Cory Jefferson | To Philadelphia 76ers: Cash considerations |
| June 27 | To New Orleans Pelicans: Draft rights to 47th pick Russ Smith | To Philadelphia 76ers: Rights to Pierre Jackson |
| June 30 | To Toronto Raptors: Louis Williams; Rights to Lucas Nogueira | To Atlanta Hawks: John Salmons; 2015 second-round pick |
July
| July 1 | To Brooklyn Nets: 2015 second-round pick; 2019 second-round pick | To Milwaukee Bucks: Right to hire Jason Kidd as head coach |
| July 10 | Three-team trade | |
| July 10 | To Boston Celtics: Marcus Thornton (from Brooklyn); Tyler Zeller (from Cleveland); 2016 Cleveland protected first-round pick (from Cleveland) (Note: Protected #10) | To Brooklyn Nets: Jarrett Jack (from Cleveland); Sergey Karasev (from Cleveland) |
| July 10 | To Cleveland Cavaliers: Rights to İlkan Karaman (from Brooklyn); Rights to Edin Bavčić (from Brooklyn); Future conditional second-round pick (from Boston) | |
| July 10 | To Utah Jazz: Steve Novak; 2017 New York second-round pick | To Toronto Raptors: Diante Garrett |
| July 11 | To New Orleans Pelicans: Alonzo Gee | To Cleveland Cavaliers: future draft considerations |
| July 12 | To Phoenix Suns: Isaiah Thomas (sign and trade) | To Sacramento Kings: Rights to Alex Oriakhi |
| July 12 | To Charlotte Hornets: Scotty Hopson; Cash considerations | To Cleveland Cavaliers: Brendan Haywood; Draft rights to 45th pick Dwight Powell |
| July 13 | To Los Angeles Lakers: Jeremy Lin; future first-round pick; 2015 Los Angeles Clippers protected second-round pick (Note: The Clippers pick is protected #31-50 and #56-60, obligation extinguished if pick falls in protected range) | To Houston Rockets: Rights to Sergei Lishchuk |
| July 13 | To New Orleans Pelicans: Scotty Hopson | To Charlotte Hornets: Cash considerations |
| July 14 | To Chicago Bulls: Rights to Milovan Raković | To Orlando Magic: Anthony Randolph; 2015 second-round pick; 2016 second-round pick; Cash considerations |
| July 14 | To Chicago Bulls: Rights to Tadija Dragićević | To Dallas Mavericks: Greg Smith |
| July 15 | Three-team trade | |
| July 15 | To New Orleans Pelicans: Ömer Aşık (from Houston); Omri Casspi (from Houston); Cash considerations (from Houston) | To Houston Rockets: Trevor Ariza (sign and trade) (from Washington); Alonzo Gee (from New Orleans); Scotty Hopson (from New Orleans); 2015 New Orleans protected first-round pick |
| July 15 | To Washington Wizards: Melvin Ely (from New Orleans) | |
| July 15 | To Atlanta Hawks: Thabo Sefolosha (sign and trade); Rights to Georgios Printezis; Cash considerations | To Oklahoma City Thunder: Rights to Sofoklis Schortsanitis; Trade exception |
| July 16 | To Washington Wizards: DeJuan Blair (sign and trade) | To Dallas Mavericks: Rights to Emir Preldžić |
| July 19 | To Washington Wizards: Kris Humphries (sign and trade) | To Boston Celtics: Future conditional second-round pick; Trade exception |
| July 22 | To Cleveland Cavaliers: John Lucas III; Malcolm Thomas; Erik Murphy | To Utah Jazz: Carrick Felix; 2015 second-round pick; Cash considerations |
August
| August 6 | To New York Knicks: Quincy Acy; Travis Outlaw | To Sacramento Kings: Wayne Ellington; Jeremy Tyler; 2016 New York second-round pick |
| August 23 | Three-team trade | |
| August 23 | To Minnesota Timberwolves: Andrew Wiggins (from Cleveland); Anthony Bennett (from Cleveland); Thaddeus Young (from Philadelphia); $6.3 million trade exception | To Cleveland Cavaliers: Kevin Love (from Minnesota) |
| August 23 | To Philadelphia 76ers: Luc Mbah a Moute (from Minnesota); Alexey Shved (from Minnesota); 2015 Miami first-round pick (from Cleveland) | |
| August 26 | To Los Angeles Clippers: Carlos Delfino; Miroslav Raduljica; 2015 second-round pick | To Milwaukee Bucks: Jared Dudley; 2017 first-round pick |
| August 26 | To Oklahoma City Thunder: 2015 protected second-round pick; Trade exception | To Philadelphia 76ers: Hasheem Thabeet; Cash considerations |
September
| September 17 | To Houston Rockets: Jason Terry; 2015 Sacramento protected second-round pick (Note: Sacramento pick is protected #50-60); 2016 New York second-round pick | To Sacramento Kings: Alonzo Gee; Scotty Hopson |
| September 25 | To Boston Celtics: John Lucas III; Erik Murphy; Dwight Powell; Malcolm Thomas; 2016 Cleveland second-round pick; 2017 Cleveland second-round pick; Trade exception | To Cleveland Cavaliers: Keith Bogans; 2015 Sacramento protected second-round pick (Note: Sacramento's pick is protected #31-55); 2017 Sacramento protected second-round pick |
| September 27 | To Philadelphia 76ers: Keith Bogans; 2018 Cleveland second-round pick | To Cleveland Cavaliers: 2015 Philadelphia protected second-round pick (Note: Philadelphia pick is protected #31-50 and #56-60); Trade exception |
October
| October 17 | To Boston Celtics: Will Bynum | To Detroit Pistons: Joel Anthony |
| October 24 | To Brooklyn Nets: Casper Ware | To Philadelphia 76ers: Marquis Teague; 2019 second-round pick (Note: previously obtained from Milwaukee in the Jason Kidd trade) |
| October 27 | To Philadelphia 76ers: Travis Outlaw; 2019 second-round pick; Right to exchange 2018 second-round draft picks | To New York Knicks: Arnett Moultrie |
December
| December 11 | To Brooklyn Nets: Brandon Davies | To Philadelphia 76ers: Andrei Kirilenko; Jorge Gutiérrez; 2020 Brooklyn second-round pick; Right to swap Cleveland second-round pick for Brooklyn second-round pick in 2018; Cash considerations |
| December 18 | To Boston Celtics: Jameer Nelson; Jae Crowder; Brandan Wright; conditional first-round pick; 2016 second-round pick; $12.9 million trade exception | To Dallas Mavericks: Rajon Rondo; Dwight Powell |
| December 19 | Three-team trade | |
| December 19 | To Houston Rockets: Corey Brewer (from Minnesota); Alexey Shved (from Philadelphia) | To Minnesota Timberwolves: Troy Daniels (from Houston); 2015 Sacramento second-round pick (from Houston) (Note: Sacramento pick is protected #50-60); 2016 Houston second-round pick (from Houston) (Note: Houston pick is protected #31-45); Cash considerations (from Houston) |
| December 19 | To Philadelphia 76ers: Ronny Turiaf (from Minnesota); Rights to Sergei Lishouk (from Houston); 2015 Houston second-round pick (from Houston) | |
| December 24 | To Detroit Pistons: Anthony Tolliver | To Phoenix Suns: Tony Mitchell |
January
| January 5 | Three-team trade | |
| January 5 | To New York Knicks: Lou Amundson (from Cleveland); Alex Kirk (from Cleveland); Lance Thomas (from Oklahoma City); 2019 second-round pick (from Cleveland) | To Cleveland Cavaliers: Iman Shumpert (from New York); J. R. Smith (from New York); future first-round pick (from Oklahoma City) |
| January 5 | To Oklahoma City Thunder: Dion Waiters (from Cleveland) | |
| January 7 | To Cleveland Cavaliers: Timofey Mozgov; 2015 second-round pick (Note: Less favourable of Chicago and Portland picks) | To Denver Nuggets: 2015 Memphis protected first-round pick; 2015 Oklahoma City protected first-round pick |
| January 7 | To Philadelphia 76ers: Jared Cunningham; Rights to Cenk Akyol; Cash considerations | To Los Angeles Clippers: Rights to Sergei Lishchuk |
| January 9 | To Boston Celtics: future Minnesota conditional first-round pick; Trade exception | To Phoenix Suns: Brandan Wright |
| January 12 | Three-team trade | |
| January 12 | To Memphis Grizzlies: Jeff Green (from Boston); Russ Smith (from New Orleans); Trade exception | To Boston Celtics: Tayshaun Prince (from Memphis); Austin Rivers (from New Orleans); Future protected first-round pick (from Memphis) |
| January 12 | To New Orleans Pelicans: Quincy Pondexter (from Memphis); 2015 second-round pick (from Memphis) | |
| January 13 | To Boston Celtics: Nate Robinson | To Denver Nuggets: Jameer Nelson |
| January 15 | Three-team trade | |
| January 15 | To Los Angeles Clippers: Austin Rivers (from Boston) | To Boston Celtics: Shavlik Randolph (from Phoenix); Chris Douglas-Roberts (from Los Angeles); 2017 second-round pick (from Los Angeles); $2.4 million trade exception |
| January 15 | To Phoenix Suns: Reggie Bullock (from Los Angeles) | |
February
| February 10 | To Charlotte Hornets: Mo Williams; Troy Daniels; Cash considerations | To Minnesota Timberwolves: Gary Neal; 2019 Miami second-round pick |
| February 10 | To Atlanta Hawks: Protected future first-round pick | To Minnesota Timberwolves: Adreian Payne |
| February 19 | To Denver Nuggets: Will Barton; Víctor Claver; Thomas Robinson; 2016 protected first-round pick (Note: Pick is protected #1-14) | To Portland Trail Blazers: Arron Afflalo; Alonzo Gee |
| February 19 | To New York Knicks: Alexey Shved; 2017 Houston second-round pick; 2019 Houston second-round pick | To Houston Rockets: Pablo Prigioni |
| February 19 | To Philadelphia 76ers: Isaiah Canaan; 2015 second-round pick (Note: Lesser of Denver and Minnesotra picks) | To Houston Rockets: K. J. McDaniels |
| February 19 | To Denver Nuggets: Rights to Cenk Akyol | To Philadelphia 76ers: JaVale McGee; 2015 first-round pick (via Oklahoma City); Rights to Chukwudiebere Maduabum |
| February 19 | To New Orleans Pelicans: Ish Smith; Rights to Latavious Williams; 2015 protected second-round pick; Cash considerations | To Oklahoma City Thunder: 2016 protected second-round pick |
| February 19 | To Boston Celtics: Isaiah Thomas | To Phoenix Suns: Marcus Thornton; 2016 Cleveland protected first-round pick |
| February 19 | To Washington Wizards: Ramon Sessions | To Sacramento Kings: Andre Miller |
| February 19 | To Detroit Pistons: Tayshaun Prince | To Boston Celtics: Jonas Jerebko; Luigi Datome |
| February 19 | To Minnesota Timberwolves: Kevin Garnett | To Brooklyn Nets: Thaddeus Young |
| February 19 | Three-team trade | |
| February 19 | To Phoenix Suns: Danny Granger (from Miami); John Salmons (from New Orleans); 2017 first-round pick (from Miami); 2021 first-round pick (from Miami) | To Miami Heat: Goran Dragić (from Phoenix); Zoran Dragić (from Phoenix) |
| February 19 | To New Orleans Pelicans: Norris Cole (from Miami); Shawne Williams (from Miami); Justin Hamilton (from Miami); Cash considerations (from Miami) | |
| February 19 | Three-team trade | |
| February 19 | To Phoenix Suns: Brandon Knight (from Milwaukee); Kendall Marshall (from Milwaukee) | To Milwaukee Bucks: Tyler Ennis (from Phoenix); Miles Plumlee (from Phoenix); Michael Carter-Williams (Philadelphia) |
| February 19 | To Philadelphia 76ers: 2015 Los Angeles Lakers protected first-round pick (from Phoenix) | |
| February 19 | Three-team trade | |
| February 19 | To Utah Jazz: Kendrick Perkins (from Oklahoma City); Grant Jerrett (from Oklahoma City); Rights to Tibor Pleiß (from Oklahoma City); 2017 protected first-round pick (from Oklahoma City); 2017 second-round pick (from Detroit) | To Oklahoma City Thunder: Enes Kanter (from Utah); Steve Novak (from Utah); D. J. Augustin (from Detroit); Kyle Singler (from Detroit); 2019 second-round pick (from Detroit) |
| February 19 | To Detroit Pistons: Reggie Jackson (from Oklahoma City) | |

=== Free agency ===
Free agency negotiation starts on July 1, 2014, with players being able to sign starting July 10, after the July moratorium ends. The following players, who last played for an NBA team in 2013–14, are scheduled to become free agents. All players will be unrestricted free agents unless indicated otherwise. A restricted free agent's team has the right to keep the player by matching an offer sheet the player signs with another team.

| Player | Date signed | New team | Former team | Ref |
|---|---|---|---|---|
| Willie Green | June 30 | Orlando Magic (claimed off waivers) | Los Angeles Clippers (waived on June 29) | |
| Shayne Whittington | July 2 | Indiana Pacers | Western Michigan (went undrafted in the 2014 draft) | |
| Bryce Cotton | July 7 | San Antonio Spurs | Providence (went undrafted in the 2014 draft) | |
| Steve Blake | July 10 | Portland Trail Blazers | Golden State Warriors | |
| Jordan Farmar | July 10 | Los Angeles Clippers | Los Angeles Lakers | |
| Marcin Gortat | July 10 | Washington Wizards | | |
| Spencer Hawes | July 10 | Los Angeles Clippers | Cleveland Cavaliers | |
| Chris Kaman | July 10 | Portland Trail Blazers | Los Angeles Lakers | |
| Kyle Lowry | July 10 | Toronto Raptors | | |
| Cole Aldrich | July 11 | New York Knicks | | |
| Lavoy Allen | July 11 | Indiana Pacers | | |
| Ben Gordon | July 11 | Orlando Magic | Charlotte Bobcats | |
| Shaun Livingston | July 11 | Golden State Warriors | Brooklyn Nets | |
| C. J. Miles | July 11 | Indiana Pacers | Cleveland Cavaliers | |
| Damjan Rudež | July 11 | Indiana Pacers | CAI Zaragoza (Spain) | |
| Vince Carter | July 12 | Memphis Grizzlies | Dallas Mavericks | |
| Darren Collison | July 12 | Sacramento Kings | Los Angeles Clippers | |
| Gordon Hayward (RFA) | July 12 | Utah Jazz (matched offer sheet from Charlotte) | | |
| LeBron James | July 12 | Cleveland Cavaliers | Miami Heat | |
| Patty Mills | July 12 | San Antonio Spurs | | |
| Patrick Patterson (RFA) | July 12 | Toronto Raptors | | |
| Isaiah Thomas (RFA) | July 12 | Phoenix Suns (via sign and trade) | Sacramento Kings | |
| Carmelo Anthony | July 13 | New York Knicks | | |
| Mario Chalmers | July 14 | Miami Heat | | |
| Troy Daniels (RFA) | July 14 | Houston Rockets | | |
| Channing Frye | July 14 | Orlando Magic | Phoenix Suns | |
| Danny Granger | July 14 | Miami Heat | Los Angeles Clippers | |
| Josh McRoberts | July 14 | Miami Heat | Charlotte Bobcats | |
| Jodie Meeks | July 14 | Detroit Pistons | Los Angeles Lakers | |
| Alan Anderson | July 15 | Brooklyn Nets | | |
| Trevor Ariza | July 15 | Houston Rockets (via sign and trade) | Washington Wizards | |
| D. J. Augustin | July 15 | Detroit Pistons | Chicago Bulls | |
| Avery Bradley (RFA) | July 15 | Boston Celtics | | |
| Caron Butler | July 15 | Detroit Pistons | Oklahoma City Thunder | |
| Luol Deng | July 15 | Miami Heat | Cleveland Cavaliers | |
| Boris Diaw | July 15 | San Antonio Spurs | | |
| Dirk Nowitzki | July 15 | Dallas Mavericks | | |
| Chandler Parsons (RFA) | July 15 | Dallas Mavericks | Houston Rockets (refused to match offer sheet) | |
| Thabo Sefolosha | July 15 | Atlanta Hawks (via sign and trade) | Oklahoma City Thunder | |
| Sebastian Telfair | July 15 | Oklahoma City Thunder | Tianjin Ronggang (China) | |
| Beno Udrih | July 15 | Memphis Grizzlies | | |
| Dwyane Wade | July 15 | Miami Heat | | |
| DeJuan Blair | July 16 | Washington Wizards (via sign and trade) | Dallas Mavericks | |
| Grant Jerrett (RFA) | July 16 | Oklahoma City Thunder | | |
| Anthony Morrow | July 16 | Oklahoma City Thunder | New Orleans Pelicans | |
| Carlos Boozer | July 17 | Los Angeles Lakers (claimed off waivers) | Chicago Bulls (waived on July 15) | |
| Devin Harris | July 17 | Dallas Mavericks | | |
| James Johnson | July 17 | Toronto Raptors | Memphis Grizzlies | |
| Paul Pierce | July 17 | Washington Wizards | Brooklyn Nets | |
| Greivis Vásquez (RFA) | July 17 | Toronto Raptors | | |
| Pau Gasol | July 18 | Chicago Bulls | Los Angeles Lakers | |
| Drew Gooden | July 18 | Washington Wizards | | |
| Eric Griffin | July 18 | Dallas Mavericks | Guaros de Lara (Venezuela) | |
| Udonis Haslem | July 18 | Miami Heat | | |
| Kevin Séraphin (RFA) | July 18 | Washington Wizards (signed qualifying offer) | | |
| Jason Smith | July 18 | New York Knicks | New Orleans Pelicans | |
| Lance Stephenson | July 18 | Charlotte Hornets | Indiana Pacers | |
| Garrett Temple | July 18 | Washington Wizards | | |
| Jeff Adrien | July 19 | Houston Rockets | Milwaukee Bucks | |
| Chris Andersen | July 19 | Miami Heat | | |
| Glen Davis | July 19 | Los Angeles Clippers | | |
| Joey Dorsey | July 19 | Houston Rockets | FC Barcelona (Spain) | |
| Kris Humphries | July 19 | Washington Wizards (via sign and trade) | Boston Celtics | |
| Ish Smith | July 19 | Houston Rockets | Phoenix Suns | |
| Kendall Marshall | July 20 | Milwaukee Bucks (claimed off waivers) | Los Angeles Lakers (waived on July 18) | |
| Matt Bonner | July 21 | San Antonio Spurs | | |
| Trevor Booker (RFA) | July 21 | Utah Jazz | Washington Wizards | |
| Kirk Hinrich | July 21 | Chicago Bulls | | |
| Richard Jefferson | July 21 | Dallas Mavericks | Utah Jazz | |
| Ryan Kelly (RFA) | July 21 | Los Angeles Lakers | | |
| Rodney Stuckey | July 21 | Indiana Pacers | Detroit Pistons | |
| Anthony Tolliver | July 21 | Phoenix Suns | Charlotte Bobcats | |
| Marvin Williams | July 21 | Charlotte Hornets | Utah Jazz | |
| Nick Young | July 21 | Los Angeles Lakers | | |
| Aaron Brooks | July 22 | Chicago Bulls | Denver Nuggets | |
| Brandon Rush | July 22 | Golden State Warriors | Utah Jazz | |
| Ed Davis | July 23 | Los Angeles Lakers | Memphis Grizzlies | |
| Jordan Hill | July 23 | Los Angeles Lakers | | |
| Robbie Hummel | July 23 | Minnesota Timberwolves | | |
| Brian Roberts | July 23 | Charlotte Hornets | New Orleans Pelicans | |
| P. J. Tucker (RFA) | July 23 | Phoenix Suns | | |
| Jimmer Fredette | July 24 | New Orleans Pelicans | Chicago Bulls | |
| Pierre Jackson | July 24 | Philadelphia 76ers | Fenerbahçe Ülker (Turkey) | |
| Jameer Nelson | July 24 | Dallas Mavericks | Orlando Magic (waived on June 30) | |
| Patric Young | July 24 | New Orleans Pelicans | Florida (went undrafted in the 2014 draft) | |
| Xavier Henry | July 25 | Los Angeles Lakers | | |
| Darius Miller | July 25 | New Orleans Pelicans | | |
| Jannero Pargo | July 25 | Charlotte Hornets | | |
| Luke Ridnour | July 25 | Orlando Magic | Charlotte Hornets | |
| Wesley Johnson | July 28 | Los Angeles Lakers | | |
| Al-Farouq Aminu | July 29 | Dallas Mavericks | New Orleans Pelicans | |
| Ivan Johnson | July 29 | Dallas Mavericks | Zhejiang Golden Bulls (China) | |
| Chris Bosh | July 30 | Miami Heat | | |
| Eric Moreland | July 30 | Sacramento Kings | Oregon State (went undrafted in the 2014 draft) | |
| Mo Williams | July 30 | Minnesota Timberwolves | Portland Trail Blazers | |
| Jerryd Bayless | July 31 | Milwaukee Bucks | Boston Celtics | |
| Shawne Williams | August 1 | Miami Heat | Los Angeles D-Fenders (D-League) | |
| Will Cherry | August 3 | Toronto Raptors | Canton Charge (D-League) | |
| James Jones | August 5 | Cleveland Cavaliers | Miami Heat | |
| Mike Miller | August 5 | Cleveland Cavaliers | Memphis Grizzlies | |
| JaMychal Green | August 6 | San Antonio Spurs | Chorale Roanne (France) | |
| Tyler Johnson | August 7 | Miami Heat | Fresno State (went undrafted in the 2014 draft) | |
| Alex Kirk | August 11 | Cleveland Cavaliers | New Mexico (went undrafted in the 2014 draft) | |
| Reggie Williams | August 12 | Miami Heat | San Miguel Beermen (Philippines) | |
| Sim Bhullar | August 14 | Sacramento Kings | New Mexico State (went undrafted in the 2014 draft) | |
| Dee Bost | August 15 | Utah Jazz | Trotamundos de Carabobo (Venezuela) | |
| Aaron Gray | August 18 | Detroit Pistons | Sacramento Kings | |
| Jordan Hamilton | August 18 | Toronto Raptors | Houston Rockets | |
| Cartier Martin | August 18 | Detroit Pistons | Atlanta Hawks | |
| Jack Cooley | August 19 | Utah Jazz | Trabzonspor (Turkey) | |
| Francisco García | August 22 | Houston Rockets | | |
| Shelvin Mack (RFA) | August 22 | Atlanta Hawks | | |
| Brock Motum | August 26 | Utah Jazz | Granarolo Bologna (Italy) | |
| John Salmons | August 26 | New Orleans Pelicans | Atlanta Hawks (waived on July 10) | |
| Mike Scott (RFA) | August 26 | Atlanta Hawks | | |
| Tarik Black | August 27 | Houston Rockets | Kansas (went undrafted in the 2014 draft) | |
| Shannon Brown | August 27 | Miami Heat | New York Knicks (waived on July 23) | |
| Kevin Murphy | August 27 | Utah Jazz | Idaho Stampede (D-League) | |
| Toure' Murry | August 28 | Utah Jazz | New York Knicks | |
| Aaron Craft | September 2 | Golden State Warriors | Ohio State (went undrafted in the 2014 draft) | |
| James Michael McAdoo | September 2 | Golden State Warriors | North Carolina (went undrafted in the 2014 draft) | |
| Mitchell Watt | September 2 | Golden State Warriors | Ironi Nes Ziona (Israel) | |
| Chris Douglas-Roberts | September 3 | Los Angeles Clippers | Charlotte Bobcats | |
| Bernard James | September 3 | Dallas Mavericks | | |
| Ekpe Udoh | September 3 | Los Angeles Clippers | Milwaukee Bucks | |
| Greg Stiemsma | September 4 | Toronto Raptors | New Orleans Pelicans | |
| C. J. Fair | September 5 | Indiana Pacers | Syracuse (went undrafted in the 2014 draft) | |
| Arinze Onuaku | September 5 | Indiana Pacers | Canton Charge (D-League) | |
| Chris Singleton | September 5 | Indiana Pacers | Washington Wizards | |
| Adonis Thomas | September 5 | Indiana Pacers | Philadelphia 76ers | |
| Justin Holiday | September 8 | Golden State Warriors | Szolnoki Olaj (Hungary) | |
| Greg Monroe (RFA) | September 8 | Detroit Pistons (signed qualifying offer) | | |
| Langston Galloway | September 9 | New York Knicks | Saint Joseph's (went undrafted in the 2014 draft) | |
| Shawn Marion | September 9 | Cleveland Cavaliers | Dallas Mavericks | |
| Travis Wear | September 9 | New York Knicks | UCLA (went undrafted in the 2014 draft) | |
| Leandro Barbosa | September 10 | Golden State Warriors | Phoenix Suns | |
| Jerome Jordan | September 11 | Brooklyn Nets | Virtus Bologna (Italy) | |
| Hedo Türkoğlu | September 12 | Los Angeles Clippers | | |
| Khem Birch | September 14 | Miami Heat | UNLV (went undrafted in the 2014 draft) | |
| Orlando Sánchez | September 17 | New York Knicks | St. John's (went undrafted in the 2014 draft) | |
| Omri Casspi | September 18 | Sacramento Kings | New Orleans Pelicans (waived on July 23) | |
| Kyrylo Fesenko | September 18 | Minnesota Timberwolves | Canton Charge (D-League) | |
| Brady Heslip | September 18 | Minnesota Timberwolves | Baylor (went undrafted in the 2014 draft) | |
| Ryan Hollins | September 18 | Sacramento Kings | Los Angeles Clippers | |
| E'Twaun Moore | September 18 | Chicago Bulls | Orlando Magic | |
| Justin Cobbs | September 22 | Charlotte Hornets | Laboral Kutxa (Spain) | |
| Wayne Ellington | September 22 | Los Angeles Lakers | Sacramento Kings (waived on September 3) | |
| Doron Lamb | September 22 | Dallas Mavericks | Orlando Magic (waived on June 30) | |
| Dallas Lauderdale | September 22 | Charlotte Hornets | Idaho Stampede (D-League) | |
| Nazr Mohammed | September 22 | Chicago Bulls | | |
| Ramon Sessions | September 22 | Sacramento Kings | Milwaukee Bucks | |
| Brian Qvale | September 22 | Charlotte Hornets | Medi Bayreuth (Germany) | |
| Keith Appling | September 23 | Los Angeles Lakers | Michigan State (went undrafted in the 2014 draft) | |
| Kent Bazemore | September 23 | Atlanta Hawks | Los Angeles Lakers | |
| Elton Brand | September 23 | Atlanta Hawks | | |
| Jabari Brown | September 23 | Los Angeles Lakers | Missouri (went undrafted in the 2014 draft) | |
| Andre Dawkins | September 23 | Miami Heat | Duke (went undrafted in the 2014 draft) | |
| Shawn Jones | September 23 | Miami Heat | Middle Tennessee (went undrafted in the 2014 draft) | |
| Roscoe Smith | September 23 | Los Angeles Lakers | UNLV (went undrafted in the 2014 draft) | |
| Jeremy Tyler | September 23 | Los Angeles Lakers | Sacramento Kings (waived on September 6) | |
| Charlie Villanueva | September 23 | Dallas Mavericks | Detroit Pistons | |
| Eric Bledsoe (RFA) | September 24 | Phoenix Suns | | |
| Diante Garrett | September 24 | Portland Trail Blazers | Toronto Raptors (waived on July 19) | |
| Darius Morris | September 24 | Portland Trail Blazers | Rio Grande Valley Vipers (D-League) | |
| Ronnie Price | September 24 | Los Angeles Lakers | Orlando Magic (waived on July 2) | |
| James Southerland | September 24 | Portland Trail Blazers | New Orleans Pelicans | |
| Michael Beasley | September 25 | Memphis Grizzlies | Miami Heat | |
| Josh Bostic | September 25 | Detroit Pistons | Spartak Saint Petersburg (Russia) | |
| Lorenzo Brown | September 25 | Detroit Pistons | Reyer Venezia (Italy) | |
| Deonte Burton | September 25 | Sacramento Kings | Nevada (went undrafted in the 2014 draft) | |
| Patrick Christopher | September 25 | Memphis Grizzlies | Iowa Energy (D-League) | |
| Earl Clark | September 25 | Memphis Grizzlies | New York Knicks | |
| Brian Cook | September 25 | Detroit Pistons | Utah Jazz | |
| Luke Hancock | September 25 | Memphis Grizzlies | Louisville (went undrafted in the 2014 draft) | |
| Trey Johnson | September 25 | Sacramento Kings | Maccabi Rishon LeZion (Israel) | |
| Dahntay Jones | September 25 | Utah Jazz | Chicago Bulls | |
| Kalin Lucas | September 25 | Memphis Grizzlies | Iowa Energy (D-League) | |
| Willie Reed | September 25 | Brooklyn Nets | Sacramento Kings (waived on June 29) | |
| Hasheem Thabeet | September 25 | Detroit Pistons | Philadelphia 76ers (waived on September 1) | |
| David Wear | September 25 | Sacramento Kings | UCLA (went undrafted in the 2014 draft) | |
| Hassan Whiteside | September 25 | Memphis Grizzlies | Jiangsu Tongxi (China) | |
| Lou Amundson | September 26 | Cleveland Cavaliers | Chicago Bulls (waived on July 15) | |
| Earl Barron | September 26 | Phoenix Suns | New York Knicks | |
| Aron Baynes (RFA) | September 26 | San Antonio Spurs | | |
| Dionte Christmas | September 26 | New Orleans Pelicans | Phoenix Suns (waived on July 24) | |
| Josh Davis | September 26 | San Antonio Spurs | San Diego State (went undrafted in the 2014 draft) | |
| Kim English | September 26 | Chicago Bulls | Chorale Roanne (France) | |
| Ben Hansbrough | September 26 | Chicago Bulls | Gran Canaria (Spain) | |
| John Holland | September 26 | San Antonio Spurs | BCM Gravelines (France) | |
| Joe Jackson | September 26 | Phoenix Suns | Memphis (went undrafted in the 2014 draft) | |
| Chris Johnson | September 26 | Miami Heat | Zhejiang Lions (China) | |
| Kevin Jones | September 26 | New Orleans Pelicans | San Miguel Beermen (Philippines) | |
| Solomon Jones | September 26 | Chicago Bulls | Erie BayHawks (D-League) | |
| Vernon Macklin | September 26 | New Orleans Pelicans | Liaoning (China) | |
| Akil Mitchell | September 26 | Houston Rockets | Virginia (went undrafted in the 2014 draft) | |
| Casey Prather | September 26 | Phoenix Suns | Florida (went undrafted in the 2014 draft) | |
| A. J. Price | September 26 | Cleveland Cavaliers | Minnesota Timberwolves | |
| Jamil Wilson | September 26 | Phoenix Suns | Marquette (went undrafted in the 2014 draft) | |
| Micheal Eric | September 27 | Milwaukee Bucks | Texas Legends (D-League) | |
| Elijah Millsap | September 27 | Milwaukee Bucks | Los Angeles D-Fenders (D-League) | |
| Chris Crawford | September 28 | Cleveland Cavaliers | Memphis (went undrafted in the 2014 draft) | |
| Shane Edwards | September 28 | Cleveland Cavaliers | Canton Charge (D-League) | |
| Jason Maxiell | September 28 | Charlotte Hornets | Orlando Magic (waived on July 4) | |
| Kadeem Batts | September 29 | Orlando Magic | Providence (went undrafted in the 2014 draft) | |
| Vander Blue | September 29 | Washington Wizards | Idaho Stampede (D-League) | |
| Rasual Butler | September 29 | Washington Wizards | Indiana Pacers | |
| Drew Crawford | September 29 | Orlando Magic | Northwestern (went undrafted in the 2014 draft) | |
| Jared Cunningham | September 29 | Los Angeles Clippers | Sacramento Kings | |
| Seth Curry | September 29 | Orlando Magic | Santa Cruz Warriors (D-League) | |
| Zoran Dragić | September 29 | Phoenix Suns | Unicaja Málaga (Spain) | |
| Jarell Eddie | September 29 | Atlanta Hawks | Virginia Tech (went undrafted in the 2014 draft) | |
| Tim Frazier | September 29 | Boston Celtics | Penn State (went undrafted in the 2014 draft) | |
| Joe Ingles | September 29 | Los Angeles Clippers | Maccabi Tel Aviv (Israel) | |
| Damion James | September 29 | Washington Wizards | San Antonio Spurs | |
| Michael Jenkins | September 29 | Oklahoma City Thunder | Pallacanestro Cantù (Italy) | |
| Chris Johnson | September 29 | Philadelphia 76ers | Boston Celtics (waived on September 25) | |
| Rodney McGruder | September 29 | Boston Celtics | Atomerőmű SE (Hungary) | |
| Daniel Orton | September 29 | Washington Wizards | Maine Red Claws (D-League) | |
| Dexter Pittman | September 29 | Atlanta Hawks | Caciques de Humacao (Puerto Rico) | |
| Ronald Roberts | September 29 | Philadelphia 76ers | Saint Joseph's (went undrafted in the 2014 draft) | |
| JaKarr Sampson | September 29 | Philadelphia 76ers | St. John's (went undrafted in the 2014 draft) | |
| Xavier Silas | September 29 | Washington Wizards | Quimsa (Argentina) | |
| Peyton Siva | September 29 | Orlando Magic | Detroit Pistons (waived on July 15) | |
| Richard Solomon | September 29 | Oklahoma City Thunder | California (went undrafted in the 2014 draft) | |
| David Stockton | September 29 | Washington Wizards | Gonzaga (went undrafted in the 2014 draft) | |
| Lance Thomas | September 29 | Oklahoma City Thunder | Foshan Dralions (China) | |
| Evan Turner | September 29 | Boston Celtics | Indiana Pacers | |
| Christian Watford | September 29 | Boston Celtics | Hapoel Eilat B.C. (Israel) | |
| Talib Zanna | September 29 | Oklahoma City Thunder | Pittsburgh (went undrafted in the 2014 draft) | |
| Jerrelle Benimon | September 30 | Denver Nuggets | Towson (went undrafted in the 2014 draft) | |
| Alonzo Gee | September 30 | Denver Nuggets | Sacramento Kings (waived on September 25) | |
| Pops Mensah-Bonsu | September 30 | Denver Nuggets | Galatasaray (Turkey) | |
| Marcus Williams | September 30 | Denver Nuggets | Shanxi Zhongyu (China) | |
| Stephen Holt | October 1 | Cleveland Cavaliers | MHP Riesen Ludwigsburg (Germany) | |
| D. J. Stephens | October 1 | New Orleans Pelicans | Anadolu Efes (Turkey) | |
| Jason Kapono | October 4 | Golden State Warriors | Panathinaikos B.C. (Greece) | |
| Drew Gordon | October 7 | Philadelphia 76ers | Dinamo Sassari (Italy) | |
| Malcolm Lee | October 7 | Philadelphia 76ers | Washington Wizards | |
| D. J. Mbenga | October 8 | New York Knicks | Barako Bull Energy (Philippines) | |
| Yuki Togashi | October 15 | Dallas Mavericks | Akita Northern Happinets (Japan) | |
| Larry Drew II | October 20 | Miami Heat | Sioux Falls Skyforce (D-League) | |
| Sean Kilpatrick | October 20 | Golden State Warriors | Cincinnati (went undrafted in the 2014 draft) | |
| John Lucas III | October 21 | Washington Wizards | Boston Celtics (waived on September 29) | |
| Geron Johnson | October 23 | Houston Rockets | Memphis (went undrafted in the 2014 draft) | |
| Jordan Vandenberg | October 23 | New York Knicks | NC State (went undrafted in the 2014 draft) | |
| Earl Clark | October 24 | Houston Rockets (claimed off waivers) | Memphis Grizzlies (waived on October 22) | |
| Jarell Eddie | October 24 | Boston Celtics (claimed off waivers) | Atlanta Hawks (waived on October 21) | |
| Fuquan Edwin | October 24 | San Antonio Spurs | Giorgio Tesi Group Pistoia (Italy) | |
| Robert Vaden | October 24 | San Antonio Spurs | Belfius Mons-Hainaut (Belgium) | |
| Akeem Richmond | October 25 | Houston Rockets | East Carolina (went undrafted in the 2014 draft) | |
| Jordan Hamilton | October 27 | Utah Jazz (claimed off waivers) | Toronto Raptors (waived on October 25) | |
| Joe Ingles | October 27 | Utah Jazz (claimed off waivers) | Los Angeles Clippers (waived on October 25) | |
| Malcolm Thomas | October 27 | Philadelphia 76ers | Boston Celtics (waived on September 29) | |
| José Juan Barea | October 29 | Dallas Mavericks | Minnesota Timberwolves (waived on October 27) | |
| Will Cherry | November 2 | Cleveland Cavaliers | Canton Charge (D-League) | |
| Kalin Lucas | November 4 | Memphis Grizzlies | Iowa Energy (D-League) | |
| A. J. Price | November 6 | Indiana Pacers | Cleveland Cavaliers (waived on November 1) | |
| Ish Smith | November 7 | Oklahoma City Thunder | Houston Rockets (waived on October 27) | |
| Drew Gordon | November 10 | Philadelphia 76ers | Delaware 87ers (D-League) | |
| Robert Covington | November 15 | Philadelphia 76ers | Grand Rapids Drive (D-League) | |
| Kalin Lucas | November 19 | Memphis Grizzlies | Iowa Energy (D-League) | |
| Hassan Whiteside | November 19 | Memphis Grizzlies | Iowa Energy (D-League) | |
| Hassan Whiteside | November 24 | Miami Heat | Iowa Energy (D-League) | |
| Jeff Adrien | November 29 | Minnesota Timberwolves | Houston Rockets (waived on October 27) | |
| A. J. Price | November 30 | Cleveland Cavaliers (claimed off waivers) | Indiana Pacers (waived on November 28) | |
| Dante Cunningham | December 4 | New Orleans Pelicans | Minnesota Timberwolves | |
| Malcolm Lee | December 5 | Philadelphia 76ers | Delaware 87ers (D-League) | |
| Gal Mekel | December 5 | New Orleans Pelicans | Dallas Mavericks (waived on October 29) | |
| Patrick Christopher | December 10 | Utah Jazz | Iowa Energy (D-League) | |
| Darius Morris | December 11 | Brooklyn Nets | Portland Trail Blazers (waived on October 25) | |
| Ronald Roberts | December 12 | Philadelphia 76ers | Delaware 87ers (D-League) | |
| Malcolm Thomas | December 23 | Philadelphia 76ers | | |
| Josh Smith | December 26 | Houston Rockets | Detroit Pistons (waived on December 22) | |
| Tarik Black | December 28 | Los Angeles Lakers (claimed off waivers) | Houston Rockets (waived on December 26) | |
| Elijah Millsap | January 5 | Utah Jazz (10-day contract) | Bakersfield Jam (D-League) | |
| Langston Galloway | January 7 | New York Knicks (10-day contract) | Westchester Knicks (D-League) | |
| Elliot Williams | January 7 | Utah Jazz (10-day contract) | Santa Cruz Warriors (D-League) | |
| Miroslav Raduljica | January 8 | Minnesota Timberwolves (10-day contract) | Shandong Lions (China) | |
| Kenyon Martin | January 9 | Milwaukee Bucks (10-day contract) | New York Knicks | |
| Lou Amundson | January 10 | New York Knicks (10-day contract, previously waived on January 7) | | |
| Lance Thomas | January 10 | New York Knicks (10-day contract, previously waived on January 7) | | |
| Tyler Johnson | January 12 | Miami Heat (10-day contract) | Sioux Falls Skyforce (D-League) | |
| Dahntay Jones | January 14 | Los Angeles Clippers (10-day contract) | Fort Wayne Mad Ants (D-League) | |
| Nate Wolters | January 14 | New Orleans Pelicans (10-day contract) | Milwaukee Bucks (waived on January 9) | |
| Elijah Millsap | January 15 | Utah Jazz (second 10-day contract) | | |
| Larry Drew II | January 16 | Philadelphia 76ers (10-day contract) | Sioux Falls Skyforce (D-League) | |
| Langston Galloway | January 17 | New York Knicks (second 10-day contract) | | |
| Quincy Miller | January 17 | Sacramento Kings (10-day contract) | Reno Bighorns (D-League) | |
| Elliot Williams | January 17 | Utah Jazz (second 10-day contract) | | |
| JaMychal Green | January 18 | San Antonio Spurs (10-day contract) | Austin Spurs (D-League) | |
| Kenyon Martin | January 19 | Milwaukee Bucks (second 10-day contract) | | |
| James Michael McAdoo | January 19 | Golden State Warriors (10-day contract) | Santa Cruz Warriors (D-League) | |
| Miroslav Raduljica | January 19 | Minnesota Timberwolves (second 10-day contract) | | |
| Lou Amundson | January 20 | New York Knicks (second 10-day contract) | | |
| Lance Thomas | January 21 | New York Knicks (second 10-day contract) | | |
| Tyrus Thomas | January 22 | Memphis Grizzlies (10-day contract) | Iowa Energy (D-League) | |
| Andre Dawkins | January 23 | Boston Celtics (10-day contract) | Sioux Falls Skyforce (D-League) | |
| Dahntay Jones | January 24 | Los Angeles Clippers (second 10-day contract) | | |
| Nate Wolters | January 24 | New Orleans Pelicans (second 10-day contract) | | |
| Elijah Millsap | January 25 | Utah Jazz (signed for rest of season) | | |
| Larry Drew II | January 26 | Philadelphia 76ers (second 10-day contract) | | |
| Langston Galloway | January 27 | New York Knicks (signed for rest of season) | | |
| Lorenzo Brown | January 28 | Minnesota Timberwolves (10-day contract) | Grand Rapids Drive (D-League) | |
| Jorge Gutiérrez | January 28 | Milwaukee Bucks (10-day contract) | Canton Charge (D-League) | |
| Chris Johnson | January 28 | Utah Jazz (10-day contract) | Rio Grande Valley Vipers (D-League) | |
| Reggie Williams | January 28 | San Antonio Spurs (10-day contract) | Oklahoma City Blue (D-League) | |
| Tyler Johnson | January 29 | Miami Heat (second 10-day contract) | | |
| Kenyon Martin | January 29 | Milwaukee Bucks (signed for rest of season) | | |
| Lou Amundson | January 30 | New York Knicks (signed for rest of season) | | |
| Quincy Miller | January 30 | Sacramento Kings (second 10-day contract) | | |
| Lance Thomas | January 31 | New York Knicks (signed for rest of season) | | |
| Andre Dawkins | February 2 | Boston Celtics (second 10-day contract) | | |
| JaMychal Green | February 2 | Memphis Grizzlies (10-day contract) | Austin Spurs (D-League) | |
| John Lucas III | February 2 | Detroit Pistons (10-day contract) | Fujian Sturgeons (China) | |
| James Michael McAdoo | February 2 | Golden State Warriors (second 10-day contract) | | |
| Dahntay Jones | February 3 | Los Angeles Clippers (signed for rest of season) | | |
| Toney Douglas | February 4 | New Orleans Pelicans (10-day contract) | Jiangsu Dragons (China) | |
| Elliot Williams | February 4 | Charlotte Hornets (10-day contract) | Santa Cruz Warriors (D-League) | |
| Tim Frazier | February 5 | Philadelphia 76ers (10-day contract) | Maine Red Claws (D-League) | |
| Lorenzo Brown | February 6 | Minnesota Timberwolves (second 10-day contract) | | |
| Jorge Gutiérrez | February 7 | Milwaukee Bucks (second 10-day contract) | | |
| Tyler Johnson | February 8 | Miami Heat (signed for rest of season) | | |
| Reggie Williams | February 8 | San Antonio Spurs (second 10-day contract) | | |
| Bernard James | February 11 | Dallas Mavericks (10-day contract) | Shanghai Sharks (China) | |
| John Lucas III | February 12 | Detroit Pistons (second 10-day contract) | | |
| Toney Douglas | February 18 | New Orleans Pelicans (second 10-day contract) | | |
| Amar'e Stoudemire | February 18 | Dallas Mavericks | New York Knicks (waived on February 16) | |
| Lorenzo Brown | February 19 | Minnesota Timberwolves (signed for rest of season) | | |
| JaMychal Green | February 19 | Memphis Grizzlies (second 10-day contract) | | |
| James Michael McAdoo | February 19 | Golden State Warriors (signed for rest of season) | | |
| Tim Frazier | February 20 | Philadelphia 76ers (second 10-day contract) | | |
| David Stockton | February 20 | Sacramento Kings (10-day contract) | Reno Bighorns (D-League) | |
| Reggie Williams | February 20 | San Antonio Spurs (signed for rest of season) | | |
| Earl Barron | February 21 | Phoenix Suns (10-day contract) | Bakersfield Jam (D-League) | |
| Bernard James | February 21 | Dallas Mavericks (second 10-day contract) | | |
| Quincy Miller | February 21 | Detroit Pistons (10-day contract) | Reno Bighorns (D-League) | |
| Henry Walker | February 21 | Miami Heat (10-day contract) | Sioux Falls Skyforce (D-League) | |
| Ish Smith | February 22 | Philadelphia 76ers | New Orleans Pelicans (waived on February 19) | |
| Jack Cooley | February 24 | Utah Jazz (10-day contract) | Idaho Stampede (D-League) | |
| Bryce Cotton | February 24 | Utah Jazz (10-day contract) | Austin Spurs (D-League) | |
| Jordan Hamilton | February 24 | Los Angeles Clippers (10-day contract) | Reno Bighorns (D-League) | |
| Kendrick Perkins | February 24 | Cleveland Cavaliers | Utah Jazz (waived on February 21) | |
| Thomas Robinson | February 24 | Philadelphia 76ers (claimed off waivers) | Denver Nuggets (waived on February 22) | |
| Shawne Williams | February 24 | Detroit Pistons (claimed off waivers) | New Orleans Pelicans (waived on February 22) | |
| John Lucas III | February 25 | Detroit Pistons (signed for rest of season) | | |
| Michael Beasley | February 26 | Miami Heat (10-day contract) | Shanghai Sharks (China) | |
| JaMychal Green | March 2 | Memphis Grizzlies (signed for rest of season) | | |
| Earl Barron | March 3 | Phoenix Suns (second 10-day contract) | | |
| Bernard James | March 3 | Dallas Mavericks (signed for rest of season) | | |
| Quincy Miller | March 3 | Detroit Pistons (second 10-day contract) | | |
| Henry Walker | March 3 | Miami Heat (second 10-day contract) | | |
| Elliot Williams | March 4 | New Orleans Pelicans (10-day contract) | Santa Cruz Warriors (D-League) | |
| Jarell Eddie | March 5 | Atlanta Hawks (10-day contract) | Austin Spurs (D-League) | |
| Justin Hamilton | March 5 | Minnesota Timberwolves (claimed off waivers) | New Orleans Pelicans (waived on March 3) | |
| Jerrelle Benimon | March 6 | Utah Jazz (10-day contract) | Idaho Stampede (D-League) | |
| Bryce Cotton | March 6 | Utah Jazz (second 10-day contract) | | |
| Jordan Hamilton | March 6 | Los Angeles Clippers (second 10-day contract) | | |
| Chris Johnson | March 6 | Milwaukee Bucks (10-day contract) | Rio Grande Valley Vipers (D-League) | |
| Nate Robinson | March 7 | Los Angeles Clippers (10-day contract) | Boston Celtics (waived on January 15) | |
| Glenn Robinson III | March 7 | Philadelphia 76ers (claimed off waivers) | Minnesota Timberwolves (waived on March 5) | |
| Michael Beasley | March 8 | Miami Heat (second 10-day contract) | | |
| Jabari Brown | March 10 | Los Angeles Lakers (10-day contract) | Los Angeles D-Fenders (D-League) | |
| Seth Curry | March 11 | Phoenix Suns (10-day contract) | Erie BayHawks (D-League) | |
| Quincy Miller | March 12 | Detroit Pistons (signed for rest of season) | | |
| Toure' Murry | March 12 | Washington Wizards (10-day contract) | Rio Grande Valley Vipers (D-League) | |
| Earl Barron | March 13 | Phoenix Suns (signed for rest of season) | | |
| Henry Walker | March 13 | Miami Heat (signed for rest of season) | | |
| Elliot Williams | March 14 | New Orleans Pelicans (second 10-day contract) | | |
| Austin Daye | March 15 | Atlanta Hawks (10-day contract) | Erie BayHawks (D-League) | |
| Jack Cooley | March 16 | Utah Jazz (second 10-day contract) | | |
| Bryce Cotton | March 16 | Utah Jazz (signed for rest of season) | | |
| Chris Johnson | March 16 | Milwaukee Bucks (second 10-day contract) | | |
| Nate Robinson | March 17 | Los Angeles Clippers (second 10-day contract) | | |
| Michael Beasley | March 18 | Miami Heat (signed for rest of season) | | |
| Sean Kilpatrick | March 19 | Minnesota Timberwolves (10-day contract) | Delaware 87ers (D-League) | |
| Ricky Ledo | March 19 | New York Knicks (10-day contract) | Texas Legends (D-League) | |
| Jordan Hamilton | March 20 | Los Angeles Clippers (signed for rest of season) | | |
| Jabari Brown | March 21 | Los Angeles Lakers (second 10-day contract) | | |
| A. J. Price | March 21 | Phoenix Suns (10-day contract) | Cleveland Cavaliers (waived on January 7) | |
| Toure' Murry | March 22 | Washington Wizards (second 10-day contract) | | |
| David Wear | March 23 | Sacramento Kings (10-day contract) | Reno Bighorns (D-League) | |
| Toney Douglas | March 24 | New Orleans Pelicans (signed for rest of season, previously waived on February 19) | | |
| Austin Daye | March 25 | Atlanta Hawks (second 10-day contract) | | |
| Jack Cooley | March 26 | Utah Jazz (signed for rest of season) | | |
| Chris Johnson | March 26 | Utah Jazz | Milwaukee Bucks (second 10-day contract expired) | |
| Will Bynum | March 27 | Washington Wizards (10-day contract) | Guangdong Southern Tigers (China) | |
| Earl Clark | March 27 | Brooklyn Nets (10-day contract) | Shandong Lions (China) | |
| Ian Clark | March 28 | Denver Nuggets (claimed off waivers) | Utah Jazz (waived on March 26) | |
| Lester Hudson | March 29 | Los Angeles Clippers (10-day contract) | Liaoning Flying Leopards (China) | |
| Ricky Ledo | March 29 | New York Knicks (second 10-day contract) | | |
| Tim Frazier | March 30 | Portland Trail Blazers | Maine Red Claws (D-League) | |
| Jabari Brown | April 1 | Los Angeles Lakers (signed for rest of season) | | |
| Jerel McNeal | April 1 | Phoenix Suns (10-day contract) | Bakersfield Jam (D-League) | |
| Sim Bhullar | April 2 | Sacramento Kings (10-day contract) | Reno Bighorns (D-League) | |
| Dwight Buycks | April 3 | Los Angeles Lakers (10-day contract) | Oklahoma City Blue (D-League) | |
| Austin Daye | April 4 | Atlanta Hawks (signed for rest of season) | | |
| Chris Babb | April 6 | Boston Celtics | Maine Red Claws (D-League) | |
| Will Bynum | April 6 | Washington Wizards (signed for rest of season) | | |
| Earl Clark | April 6 | Brooklyn Nets (signed for rest of season) | | |
| Jorge Gutiérrez | April 7 | Milwaukee Bucks | Canton Charge (D-League) | |
| Arinze Onuaku | April 7 | Minnesota Timberwolves | Canton Charge (D-League) | |
| Ricky Ledo | April 8 | New York Knicks (signed for rest of season) | | |
| Shavlik Randolph | April 8 | Denver Nuggets (claimed off waivers) | Boston Celtics (waived on April 6) | |
| Lester Hudson | April 11 | Los Angeles Clippers (signed for rest of season) | | |
| Jerel McNeal | April 11 | Phoenix Suns (signed for rest of season) | | |
| Jamaal Franklin | April 12 | Denver Nuggets | Los Angeles D-Fenders (D-League) | |
| David Stockton | April 12 | Sacramento Kings | Reno Bighorns (D-League) | |
| Vander Blue | April 13 | Los Angeles Lakers | Los Angeles D-Fenders (D-League) | |
| Ray Allen | | | Miami Heat | |
| Andrew Bynum | | | Indiana Pacers | |
| Othyus Jeffers | | | Minnesota Timberwolves | |
| Rashard Lewis (Note: Lewis signed with the Dallas Mavericks on July 19, but the Mavericks voided his contract on July 23 after he failed his physical when it was discovered his right knee required surgery.) | | | Miami Heat | |
| Greg Oden | | | Miami Heat | |
| Lamar Odom | | | New York Knicks | |
| Emeka Okafor | | | Phoenix Suns | |
| Jermaine O'Neal | | | Golden State Warriors | |

* Player option
** Team option
*** Early termination option

=== Going overseas ===
| * | Denotes international players who returned to their home country |

| Player | Date signed | New team | New country | NBA team | NBA contract status | Ref |
|---|---|---|---|---|---|---|
| Tornike Shengelia | June 21 | Laboral Kutxa | Spain | Chicago Bulls | Unrestricted free agent | |
| Nando de Colo | July 9 | CSKA Moscow | Russia | Toronto Raptors | Unrestricted free agent | |
| Bogdan Bogdanović | July 11 | Fenerbahçe Ülker | Turkey | Phoenix Suns | Unsigned draft pick | |
| Alessandro Gentile* | July 19 | EA7 Emporio Armani Milano | Italy | Houston Rockets | Unsigned draft pick | |
| Dwight Buycks | July 25 | Valencia Basket | Spain | Toronto Raptors | Unrestricted free agent | |
| Lorenzo Brown | July 29 | Reyer Venezia Mestre | Italy | Philadelphia 76ers | Unrestricted free agent | |
| Maalik Wayns | July 30 | Žalgiris Kaunas | Lithuania | Los Angeles Clippers | Unrestricted free agent | |
| Nemanja Dangubić* | July 31 | Crvena Zvezda | Serbia | San Antonio Spurs | Unsigned draft pick | |
| Vasilije Micić | August 4 | Bayern Munich | Germany | Philadelphia 76ers | Unsigned draft pick | |
| Metta World Peace | August 4 | Sichuan Blue Whales | China | New York Knicks | Unrestricted free agent | |
| James Anderson | August 5 | Žalgiris Kaunas | Lithuania | Philadelphia 76ers | Unrestricted free agent | |
| Lamar Patterson | August 5 | Tofaş Bursa | Turkey | Atlanta Hawks | Unsigned draft pick | |
| Jan Veselý | August 5 | Fenerbahçe Ülker | Turkey | Denver Nuggets | Unrestricted free agent | |
| Hilton Armstrong | August 6 | Beşiktaş | Turkey | Golden State Warriors | Unrestricted free agent | |
| Xavier Thames | August 6 | Baloncesto Sevilla | Spain | Brooklyn Nets | Unsigned draft pick | |
| MarShon Brooks | August 8 | EA7 Emporio Armani Milano | Italy | Los Angeles Lakers | Unrestricted free agent | |
| Al Harrington | August 11 | Fujian Sturgeons | China | Washington Wizards | Unrestricted free agent | |
| Byron Mullens | August 11 | Shanxi Zhongyu | China | Philadelphia 76ers | Unrestricted free agent | |
| Josh Childress | August 12 | Sydney Kings | Australia | New Orleans Pelicans | Unrestricted free agent | |
| DeAndre Daniels | August 14 | Perth Wildcats | Australia | Toronto Raptors | Unsigned draft pick | |
| Orlando Johnson | August 14 | Laboral Kutxa | Spain | Sacramento Kings | Unrestricted free agent | |
| Tony Mitchell | August 18 | Aquila Basket Trento | Italy | Milwaukee Bucks | Unrestricted free agent | |
| Anthony Randolph | August 18 | Lokomotiv Kuban | Russia | Orlando Magic | Unrestricted free agent | |
| Toney Douglas | August 19 | Jiangsu Dragons | China | Miami Heat | Unrestricted free agent | |
| Jordan McRae | August 29 | Melbourne United | Australia | Philadelphia 76ers | Unsigned draft pick | |
| Ryan Gomes | September 11 | Laboral Kutxa | Spain | Boston Celtics | Unrestricted free agent | |
| Mustafa Shakur | September 12 | Neptūnas | Lithuania | Oklahoma City Thunder | Unrestricted free agent | |
| Julyan Stone | September 12 | Umana Reyer Venezia | Italy | Toronto Raptors | Unrestricted free agent | |
| Viacheslav Kravtsov | September 16 | Foshan Dralions | China | Phoenix Suns | Unrestricted free agent | |
| James Nunnally | September 17 | Tuenti Móvil Estudiantes | Spain | Philadelphia 76ers | Unrestricted free agent | |
| Tyshawn Taylor | September 17 | Dynamo Moscow | Russia | New Orleans Pelicans | Unrestricted free agent | |
| Jordan Crawford | September 18 | Xinjiang Flying Tigers | China | Golden State Warriors | Unrestricted free agent | |
| Miroslav Raduljica | September 19 | Shandong Lions | China | Los Angeles Clippers | Unrestricted free agent | |
| Andray Blatche | September 20 | Xinjiang Flying Tigers | China | Brooklyn Nets | Unrestricted free agent | |
| Gustavo Ayón | September 23 | Real Madrid | Spain | Atlanta Hawks | Unrestricted free agent | |
| Josh Harrellson | September 23 | Chongqing Flying Dragons | China | Detroit Pistons | Unrestricted free agent | |
| D. J. White | October 4 | Laboral Kutxa | Spain | Charlotte Bobcats | Unrestricted free agent | |
| Jamaal Franklin | October 7 | Zhejiang Lions | China | Memphis Grizzlies | Unrestricted free agent | |
| Michael Beasley | October 9 | Shanghai Sharks | China | Memphis Grizzlies | Unrestricted free agent | |
| James Southerland | October 14 | Limoges CSP | France | Portland Trail Blazers | Unrestricted free agent | |
| Dee Bost | October 24 | Trabzonspor | Turkey | Utah Jazz | Unrestricted free agent | |
| Jeremy Tyler | October 25 | Shanxi Zhongyu | China | Los Angeles Lakers | Unrestricted free agent | |
| Chris Wright | October 26 | Turów Zgorzelec | Poland | Milwaukee Bucks | Unrestricted free agent | |
| Kim English | October 27 | SLUC Nancy Basket | France | Chicago Bulls | Unrestricted free agent | |
| Brian Qvale | October 28 | Tofaş | Turkey | Charlotte Hornets | Unrestricted free agent | |
| Casper Ware | November 1 | EWE Baskets Oldenburg | Germany | Brooklyn Nets | Unrestricted free agent | |
| Deonte Burton | November 3 | ratiopharm Ulm | Germany | Sacramento Kings | Unrestricted free agent | |
| Brock Motum* | November 3 | Adelaide 36ers | Australia | Utah Jazz | Unrestricted free agent | |
| Luke Hancock | November 4 | Panionios | Greece | Memphis Grizzlies | Unrestricted free agent | |
| Kyrylo Fesenko | November 5 | Avtodor Saratov | Russia | Minnesota Timberwolves | Unrestricted free agent | |
| Dionte Christmas | November 12 | Paris-Levallois | France | New Orleans Pelicans | Unrestricted free agent | |
| Nemanja Nedović | November 14 | Valencia Basket | Spain | Golden State Warriors | Unrestricted free agent | |
| John Lucas III | November 21 | Fujian Sturgeons | China | Washington Wizards | Unrestricted free agent | |
| Vernon Macklin | November 22 | Al Jaysh | Qatar | New Orleans Pelicans | Unrestricted free agent | |
| D. J. Stephens | December 2 | Zenit Saint Petersburg | Russia | New Orleans Pelicans | Unrestricted free agent | |
| Sebastian Telfair | December 2 | Xinjiang Flying Tigers | China | Oklahoma City Thunder | Unrestricted free agent | |
| Patric Young | December 3 | Galatasaray | Turkey | New Orleans Pelicans | Unrestricted free agent | |
| Will Bynum | December 5 | Guangdong Southern Tigers | China | Boston Celtics | Unrestricted free agent | |
| Will Cherry | December 7 | Žalgiris Kaunas | Lithuania | Cleveland Cavaliers | Unrestricted free agent | |
| Arnett Moultrie | December 16 | Jiangsu Dragons | China | New York Knicks | Unrestricted free agent | |
| Brandon Davies | January 12 | Élan Chalon | France | Brooklyn Nets | Unrestricted free agent | |
| Jeff Adrien | January 19 | Guangdong Southern Tigers | China | Minnesota Timberwolves | Unrestricted free agent | |
| Tony Mitchell | February 5 | Atléticos de San Germán | Puerto Rico | Phoenix Suns | Unrestricted free agent | |
| Jordan Farmar | February 7 | Darüşşafaka Doğuş | Turkey | Los Angeles Clippers | Unrestricted free agent | |
| Andrei Kirilenko* | February 24 | CSKA Moscow | Russia | Philadelphia 76ers | Unrestricted free agent | |
| Gal Mekel | February 24 | Nizhny Novgorod | Russia | New Orleans Pelicans | Unrestricted free agent | |
| Darius Miller | February 24 | Brose Baskets | Germany | New Orleans Pelicans | Unrestricted free agent | |
| Víctor Claver | March 1 | Khimki | Russia | Denver Nuggets | Unrestricted free agent | |

=== Released ===
==== Waived ====
| Player | Date waived | Former team | Ref |
|---|---|---|---|
| Willie Green | June 29 | Los Angeles Clippers | |
| Willie Reed | June 29 | Sacramento Kings | |
| James Anderson | June 30 | Philadelphia 76ers | |
| Doron Lamb | June 30 | Orlando Magic | |
| Jameer Nelson | June 30 | Orlando Magic | |
| Ronnie Price | July 2 | Orlando Magic | |
| Jason Maxiell | July 4 | Orlando Magic | |
| Julyan Stone | July 7 | Toronto Raptors | |
| John Salmons | July 10 | Atlanta Hawks | |
| Lamar Odom | July 11 | New York Knicks | |
| Lou Amundson | July 15 | Chicago Bulls | |
| Carlos Boozer* | July 15 | Chicago Bulls | |
| Ronnie Brewer | July 15 | Chicago Bulls | |
| Josh Harrellson | July 15 | Detroit Pistons | |
| Mike James | July 15 | Chicago Bulls | |
| Anthony Randolph | July 15 | Orlando Magic | |
| Ish Smith | July 15 | Phoenix Suns | |
| Peyton Siva | July 15 | Detroit Pistons | |
| Kendall Marshall | July 18 | Los Angeles Lakers | |
| Dwight Buycks | July 19 | Toronto Raptors | |
| Diante Garrett | July 19 | Toronto Raptors | |
| Shannon Brown | July 23 | New York Knicks | |
| Omri Casspi | July 23 | New Orleans Pelicans | |
| Dionte Christmas | July 24 | Phoenix Suns | |
| Hilton Armstrong | July 30 | Golden State Warriors | |
| Melvin Ely | July 30 | Washington Wizards | |
| Carlos Delfino | August 29 | Los Angeles Clippers | |
| Miroslav Raduljica | August 29 | Los Angeles Clippers | |
| Jamaal Franklin | August 31 | Memphis Grizzlies | |
| Hasheem Thabeet | September 1 | Philadelphia 76ers | |
| Wayne Ellington | September 3 | Sacramento Kings | |
| Jeremy Tyler | September 6 | Sacramento Kings | |
| Scotty Hopson | September 24 | Sacramento Kings | |
| Chris Babb | September 25 | Boston Celtics | |
| Alonzo Gee | September 25 | Sacramento Kings | |
| Chris Johnson | September 25 | Boston Celtics | |
| John Lucas III | September 29 | Boston Celtics | |
| Malcolm Thomas | September 29 | Boston Celtics | |
| Pierre Jackson | September 30 | Philadelphia 76ers | |
| Gal Mekel | October 29 | Dallas Mavericks | |
| A. J. Price | November 1 | Cleveland Cavaliers | |
| Jordan Hamilton | November 6 | Utah Jazz | |
| Kalin Lucas | November 9 | Memphis Grizzlies | |
| Malcolm Thomas | November 10 | Philadelphia 76ers | |
| Nemanja Nedović | November 11 | Golden State Warriors | |
| Chris Johnson | November 15 | Philadelphia 76ers | |
| Kalin Lucas | November 20 | Memphis Grizzlies | |
| Hassan Whiteside | November 20 | Memphis Grizzlies | |
| Shannon Brown | November 24 | Miami Heat | |
| Sebastian Telfair | November 26 | Oklahoma City Thunder | |
| A. J. Price | November 28 | Indiana Pacers | |
| Will Cherry | November 30 | Cleveland Cavaliers | |
| Darius Miller | November 30 | New Orleans Pelicans | |
| Patric Young | November 30 | New Orleans Pelicans | |
| Drew Gordon | December 5 | Philadelphia 76ers | |
| Malcolm Lee | December 11 | Philadelphia 76ers | |
| Jorge Gutiérrez | December 12 | Philadelphia 76ers | |
| Ronald Roberts | December 15 | Philadelphia 76ers | |
| Vítor Faverani | December 18 | Boston Celtics | |
| Gal Mekel | December 19 | New Orleans Pelicans | |
| Francisco García | December 19 | Houston Rockets | |
| Josh Smith | December 22 | Detroit Pistons | |
| Ronny Turiaf | December 23 | Philadelphia 76ers | |
| Tarik Black | December 26 | Houston Rockets | |
| Xavier Henry | December 28 | Los Angeles Lakers | |
| Toure' Murry | January 4 | Utah Jazz | |
| Samuel Dalembert | January 5 | New York Knicks | |
| Patrick Christopher | January 6 | Utah Jazz | |
| Brandon Davies | January 6 | Brooklyn Nets | |
| Andre Dawkins | January 6 | Miami Heat | |
| Jeff Adrien | January 7 | Minnesota Timberwolves | |
| Lou Amundson | January 7 | New York Knicks | |
| Jared Cunningham | January 7 | Philadelphia 76ers | |
| Alex Kirk | January 7 | New York Knicks | |
| A. J. Price | January 7 | Cleveland Cavaliers | |
| Glen Rice Jr. | January 7 | Washington Wizards | |
| Lance Thomas | January 7 | New York Knicks | |
| Tony Mitchell | January 9 | Phoenix Suns | |
| Nate Wolters | January 9 | Milwaukee Bucks | |
| Nate Robinson | January 15 | Boston Celtics | |
| Jordan Farmar | January 16 | Los Angeles Clippers | |
| Austin Daye | January 17 | San Antonio Spurs | |
| Chris Douglas-Roberts | January 18 | Boston Celtics | |
| Miroslav Raduljica | January 28 | Minnesota Timberwolves | |
| Jannero Pargo | February 4 | Charlotte Hornets | |
| Elliot Williams | February 10 | Charlotte Hornets | |
| Amar'e Stoudemire | February 16 | New York Knicks | |
| Ricky Ledo | February 18 | Dallas Mavericks | |
| Toney Douglas | February 19 | New Orleans Pelicans | |
| Kenyon Martin | February 19 | Milwaukee Bucks | |
| Ish Smith | February 19 | New Orleans Pelicans | |
| Andrei Kirilenko | February 21 | Philadelphia 76ers | |
| Kendall Marshall | February 21 | Phoenix Suns | |
| Kendrick Perkins | February 21 | Utah Jazz | |
| John Salmons | February 21 | Phoenix Suns | |
| Larry Sanders | February 21 | Milwaukee Bucks | |
| Víctor Claver | February 22 | Denver Nuggets | |
| Thomas Robinson | February 22 | Denver Nuggets | |
| Malcolm Thomas | February 22 | Philadelphia 76ers | |
| Shawne Williams | February 22 | New Orleans Pelicans | |
| Tim Frazier | February 24 | Philadelphia 76ers | |
| JaVale McGee | March 1 | Philadelphia 76ers | |
| Justin Hamilton | March 3 | New Orleans Pelicans | |
| Glenn Robinson III | March 5 | Minnesota Timberwolves | |
| Ian Clark | March 26 | Utah Jazz | |
| Toure' Murry | March 27 | Washington Wizards | |
| Shavlik Randolph | April 6 | Boston Celtics | |
| Shavlik Randolph | April 12 | Denver Nuggets | |

Note

- * Released under the amnesty clause in the CBA, which gives teams a one-time option to waive a player's remaining contract from the salary cap.

==== Training camp cuts ====
All players listed did not make the final roster.

| Atlanta Hawks | Boston Celtics | Brooklyn Nets | Charlotte Hornets | Chicago Bulls |
|---|---|---|---|---|
| Jarell Eddie; Dexter Pittman | Will Bynum; Jarell Eddie; Tim Frazier; Rodney McGruder; Erik Murphy; Christian Watford | Willie Reed; Casper Ware | Justin Cobbs; Dallas Lauderdale; Brian Qvale | Kim English; Ben Hansbrough; Solomon Jones |
| Cleveland Cavaliers | Dallas Mavericks | Denver Nuggets | Detroit Pistons | Golden State Warriors |
| Chris Crawford; Shane Edwards; Stephen Holt | Eric Griffin; Bernard James; Ivan Johnson; Doron Lamb; Yuki Togashi | Jerrelle Benimon; Quincy Miller; Marcus Williams | Josh Bostic; Lorenzo Brown; Brian Cook; Aaron Gray; Hasheem Thabeet | Aaron Craft; Jason Kapono; Sean Kilpatrick; James Michael McAdoo; Mitchell Watt |
| Houston Rockets | Indiana Pacers | Los Angeles Clippers | Los Angeles Lakers | Memphis Grizzlies |
| Jeff Adrien; Earl Clark; Robert Covington; Geron Johnson; Akil Mitchell; Josh Powell; Akeem Richmond; Ish Smith | C. J. Fair; Arinze Onuaku; Chris Singleton; Adonis Thomas | Joe Ingles | Keith Appling; Jabari Brown; Roscoe Smith; Jeremy Tyler | Michael Beasley; Patrick Christopher; Earl Clark; Luke Hancock; Kalin Lucas; Hassan Whiteside |
| Miami Heat | Milwaukee Bucks | Minnesota Timberwolves | New Orleans Pelicans | New York Knicks |
| Khem Birch; Larry Drew II; Chris Johnson; Tyler Johnson; Shawn Jones; Reggie Williams | Micheal Eric; Elijah Millsap; Chris Wright | J. J. Barea; Kyrylo Fesenko; Brady Heslip | Dionte Christmas; Kevin Jones; Vernon Macklin; D. J. Stephens | Langston Galloway; D. J. Mbenga; Arnett Moultrie; Orlando Sánchez; Jordan Vandenberg |
| Oklahoma City Thunder | Orlando Magic | Philadelphia 76ers | Phoenix Suns | Portland Trail Blazers |
| Michael Jenkins; Richard Solomon; Talib Zanna | Kadeem Batts; Drew Crawford; Seth Curry; Peyton Siva | Keith Bogans; Drew Gordon; Malcolm Lee; Travis Outlaw; Ronald Roberts; Marquis Teague; Jarvis Varnado; Elliot Williams | Earl Barron; Joe Jackson; Casey Prather; Jamil Wilson | Diante Garrett; Darius Morris; James Southerland |
| Sacramento Kings | San Antonio Spurs | Toronto Raptors | Utah Jazz | Washington Wizards |
| Sim Bhullar; Deonte Burton; Trey Johnson; David Wear | Bryce Cotton; Josh Davis; Fuquan Edwin; JaMychal Green; John Holland; Robert Vaden | Will Cherry; Jordan Hamilton | Dee Bost; Jack Cooley; Carrick Felix; Dahntay Jones; Brock Motum; Kevin Murphy | Vander Blue; Damion James; John Lucas III; Daniel Orton; Xavier Silas; David Stockton |

== Draft ==
=== 2014 NBA draft ===
The 2014 NBA draft was held on June 26, 2014, at Barclays Center in Brooklyn, New York.

==== First round ====
| Pick | Player | Date signed | Team | School/club team | Ref |
|---|---|---|---|---|---|
| 1 | Andrew Wiggins | July 24 | Cleveland Cavaliers (later traded to Minnesota) | Kansas (Fr.) | |
| 2 | Jabari Parker | July 9 | Milwaukee Bucks | Duke (Fr.) | |
| 3 | Joel Embiid | August 26 | Philadelphia 76ers | Kansas (Fr.) | |
| 4 | Aaron Gordon | July 2 | Orlando Magic | Arizona (Fr.) | |
| 5 | Dante Exum | July 11 | Utah Jazz | Australian Institute of Sport | |
| 6 | Marcus Smart | July 10 | Boston Celtics | Oklahoma State (So.) | |
| 7 | Julius Randle | July 13 | Los Angeles Lakers | Kentucky (Fr.) | |
| 8 | Nik Stauskas | July 8 | Sacramento Kings | Michigan (So.) | |
| 9 | Noah Vonleh | July 25 | Charlotte Hornets (acquired from Detroit) | Indiana (Fr.) | |
| 10 | Elfrid Payton | July 2 | Orlando Magic (acquired from New Orleans via Philadelphia) | Louisiana-Lafayette (Jr.) | |
| 11 | Doug McDermott | July 22 | Chicago Bulls (acquired from Denver) | Creighton (Sr.) | |
| 12 | Dario Šarić | — | Philadelphia 76ers (acquired from New York via Orlando) | Anadolu Efes (Turkey) | |
| 13 | Zach LaVine | July 8 | Minnesota Timberwolves | UCLA (Fr.) | |
| 14 | T. J. Warren | August 8 | Phoenix Suns | North Carolina State (So.) | |
| 15 | Adreian Payne | July 25 | Atlanta Hawks | Michigan State (Sr.) | |
| 16 | Jusuf Nurkić | July 31 | Denver Nuggets (acquired from Charlotte via Chicago) | Cedevita Zagreb (Croatia) | |
| 17 | James Young | July 10 | Boston Celtics (acquired from Brooklyn) | Kentucky (Fr.) | |
| 18 | Tyler Ennis | August 8 | Phoenix Suns (acquired from Washington) | Syracuse (Fr.) | |
| 19 | Gary Harris | July 31 | Denver Nuggets (acquired from Chicago) | Michigan State (So.) | |
| 20 | Bruno Caboclo | July 9 | Toronto Raptors | E.C. Pinheiros (Brazil) | |
| 21 | Mitch McGary | July 5 | Oklahoma City Thunder (acquired from Dallas via LA Lakers and Houston) | Michigan (So.) | |
| 22 | Jordan Adams | July 7 | Memphis Grizzlies | UCLA (So.) | |
| 23 | Rodney Hood | July 11 | Utah Jazz (acquired from Golden State) | Duke (So.) | |
| 24 | Shabazz Napier | July 18 | Miami Heat (acquired from Portland via Charlotte) | Connecticut (Sr.) | |
| 25 | Clint Capela | July 25 | Houston Rockets | Élan Chalon (France) | |
| 26 | P. J. Hairston | August 22 | Charlotte Hornets (acquired from Miami) | Texas Legends (D-League) | |
| 27 | Bogdan Bogdanović | — | Phoenix Suns (acquired from Indiana) | Partizan Belgrade (Serbia) | |
| 28 | C. J. Wilcox | July 12 | Los Angeles Clippers | Washington (Sr.) | |
| 29 | Josh Huestis | — | Oklahoma City Thunder | Stanford (Sr.) | |
| 30 | Kyle Anderson | July 12 | San Antonio Spurs | UCLA (So.) | |

==== Second round ====
| Pick | Player | Date signed | Team | School/club team | Ref |
|---|---|---|---|---|---|
| 31 | Damien Inglis | August 26 | Milwaukee Bucks | Chorale Roanne (France) | |
| 32 | K. J. McDaniels | October 1 | Philadelphia 76ers | Clemson (Jr.) | |
| 33 | Joe Harris | July 24 | Cleveland Cavaliers (acquired from Orlando) | Virginia (Sr.) | |
| 34 | Cleanthony Early | August 1 | New York Knicks (acquired from Boston via Dallas) | Wichita State (Sr.) | |
| 35 | Jarnell Stokes | August 18 | Memphis Grizzlies (acquired from Utah) | Tennessee (Jr.) | |
| 36 | Johnny O'Bryant III | July 30 | Milwaukee Bucks (acquired from LA Lakers via Phoenix and Minnesota) | Louisiana State (Jr.) | |
| 37 | DeAndre Daniels | — | Toronto Raptors (acquired from Sacramento) | Connecticut (Jr.) | |
| 38 | Spencer Dinwiddie | July 21 | Detroit Pistons | Colorado (Jr.) | |
| 39 | Jerami Grant | September 29 | Philadelphia 76ers (acquired from Cleveland) | Syracuse (So.) | |
| 40 | Glenn Robinson III | September 17 | Minnesota Timberwolves (acquired from New Orleans) | Michigan (So.) | |
| 41 | Nikola Jokić | — | Denver Nuggets | Mega Vizura (Serbia) | |
| 42 | Nick Johnson | July 25 | Houston Rockets (acquired from New York) | Arizona (Jr.) | |
| 43 | Walter Tavares | — | Atlanta Hawks | Gran Canaria (Spain) | |
| 44 | Markel Brown | July 23 | Brooklyn Nets (acquired from Minnesota) | Oklahoma State (Sr.) | |
| 45 | Dwight Powell | August 23 | Cleveland Cavaliers (acquired from Charlotte) | Stanford (Sr.) | |
| 46 | Jordan Clarkson | August 25 | Los Angeles Lakers (acquired from Washington) | Missouri (Jr.) | |
| 47 | Russ Smith | July 15 | New Orleans Pelicans (acquired from Philadelphia via Brooklyn, Boston and Dallas) | Louisville (Sr.) | |
| 48 | Lamar Patterson | — | Atlanta Hawks (acquired from Toronto via Phoenix and Milwaukee) | Pittsburgh (Sr.) | |
| 49 | Cameron Bairstow | July 21 | Chicago Bulls | New Mexico (Sr.) | |
| 50 | Alec Brown | — | Phoenix Suns | Green Bay (Sr.) | |
| 51 | Thanasis Antetokounmpo | — | New York Knicks (acquired from Dallas) | Delaware 87ers (D-League) | |
| 52 | Vasilije Micić | — | Philadelphia 76ers (acquired from Memphis via Cleveland) | Mega Vizura (Serbia) | |
| 53 | Alessandro Gentile | — | Houston Rockets (acquired from Minnesota via Golden State) | Olimpia Milano (Italy) | |
| 54 | Nemanja Dangubić | — | San Antonio Spurs (acquired from Houston via Milwaukee and Philadelphia) | Mega Vizura (Serbia) | |
| 55 | Semaj Christon | — | Oklahoma City Thunder (acquired from Miami via Charlotte) | Xavier (So.) | |
| 56 | Roy Devyn Marble | July 24 | Orlando Magic (acquired from Portland via Denver) | Iowa (Sr.) | |
| 57 | Louis Labeyrie | — | New York Knicks (acquired from Indiana) | Paris-Levallois Basket (France) | |
| 58 | Jordan McRae | — | Philadelphia 76ers (acquired from LA Clippers via New Orleans and San Antonio) | Tennessee (Sr.) | |
| 59 | Xavier Thames | — | Brooklyn Nets (acquired from Oklahoma City via New York and Toronto) | San Diego State (Sr.) | |
| 60 | Cory Jefferson | July 23 | Brooklyn Nets (acquired from San Antonio via Philadelphia) | Baylor (Sr.) | |

=== Previous years' draftees ===
| Draft | Pick | Player | Date signed | Team | Previous team | Ref |
|---|---|---|---|---|---|---|
| 2013 | 50 | James Ennis | July 15 | Miami Heat | Piratas de Quebradillas (Puerto Rico) | |
| 2011 | 23 | Nikola Mirotić | July 18 | Chicago Bulls | Real Madrid (Spain) | |
| 2011 | 31 | Bojan Bogdanović | July 22 | Brooklyn Nets | Fenerbahçe Ülker (Turkey) | |
| 2013 | 46 | Erick Green | August 1 | Denver Nuggets | Montepaschi Siena (Italy) | |
| 2013 | 16 | Lucas Nogueira | August 3 | Toronto Raptors | CB Estudiantes (Spain) | |
| 2012 | 48 | Kostas Papanikolaou | September 23 | Houston Rockets | FC Barcelona (Spain) | |
| 2012 | 53 | Furkan Aldemir | December 15 | Philadelphia 76ers | Galatasaray (Turkey) | |
| 2013 | 55 | Joffrey Lauvergne | February 19 | Denver Nuggets | Khimki (Russia) | |
