= Andre Dawkins =

American basketball player (born 1991)

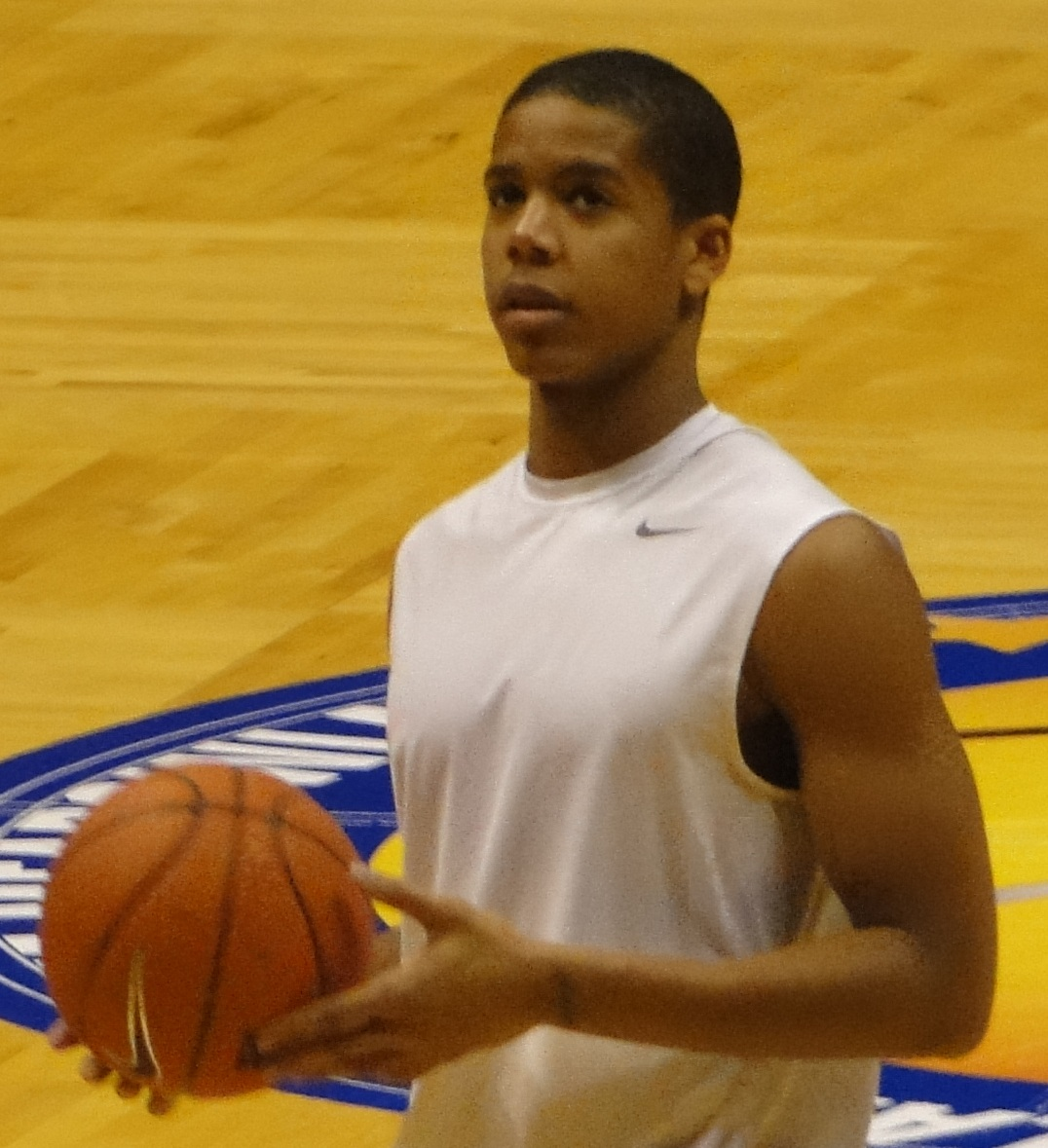
- Dawkins in 2009

Personal information
- Born: September 19, 1991 (age 34) Fairfax, Virginia, U.S.
- Listed height: 6 ft 5 in (1.96 m)
- Listed weight: 215 lb (98 kg)

Career information
- High school: Atlantic Shores Christian (Chesapeake, Virginia)
- College: Duke (2009–2014)
- NBA draft: 2014: undrafted
- Playing career: 2014–2018
- Position: Shooting guard

Career history
- 2014–2015: Miami Heat
- 2014: →Sioux Falls Skyforce
- 2015: Sioux Falls Skyforce
- 2015: Maine Red Claws
- 2015: Sioux Falls Skyforce
- 2015–2016: Auxilium CUS Torino
- 2016: Texas Legends
- 2016–2017: Windy City Bulls
- 2017: Texas Legends
- 2017–2018: Agua Caliente Clippers

Career highlights
- NBA D-League All-Rookie Third Team (2015); NCAA champion (2010)
- Stats at NBA.com
- Stats at Basketball Reference

Andre Wade Dawkins (born September 19, 1991) is an American former professional basketball player. He played college basketball for the Duke Blue Devils.

== Early life ==
Born in Fairfax, Virginia to mother, Tammy Hill, Dawkins was raised by Andre and Pamela Dawkins. He started his high school basketball career at Deep Creek High School in Chesapeake, Virginia, before transferring to Atlantic Shores Christian School, where he reclassified as a freshman. He was a three-time first team all-state, all-conference, and all-state tournament team selection. He was named conference player of the year as a sophomore, after averaging 22.4 points and 7.0 rebounds per game.

== College career ==
In June 2008, Dawkins committed to join Duke in 2010, but in July 2009 he announced he would graduate a year ahead of schedule to enroll at Duke University in time for the 2009–10 season, following the transfer of guard, Elliot Williams, to Memphis.

In December 2009 an automobile accident in West Virginia killed Dawkins' sister, Lacey, and injured their mother, Tamara Hill. The two had been on their way from Columbus, Ohio, to see Dawkins play against St. John's. He played in 38 games in the 2009–10 season, averaging 12.6 minutes and 4.4 points per game.

As a freshman, he was a back-up guard on Duke's 2010 national champion team. In the NCAA tournament Elite Eight game (March 28, 2010) against Baylor, Dawkins hit two crucial three-pointers in the first half to help Duke stay in the game.

In the Summer of 2012, Duke announced that Dawkins would redshirt the 2012–13 season.

On April 11, 2013, Dawkins announced he was returning to Duke for his Senior season and changing his number from 20 to 34 (a nod to one of his idols, Ray Allen, who changed his number from 20 to 34 for the final stage of his career when he joined the Miami Heat).

== Professional career ==
=== 2014–15 season ===
After going undrafted in the 2014 NBA draft, Dawkins joined the Miami Heat for the 2014 NBA Summer League. On September 23, 2014, he signed with the Heat. On December 3, 2014, he was assigned to the Sioux Falls Skyforce of the NBA Development League. On December 21, he was recalled by the Heat. On January 6, 2015, he was waived by the Heat after appearing in just four games. Six days later, he was acquired by the Skyforce.

On January 23, 2015, Dawkins signed a 10-day contract with the Boston Celtics, but was immediately assigned to their D-League affiliate, the Maine Red Claws. He was recalled on the afternoon of January 29, but was reassigned to Maine later that day after one practice with the Celtics. On February 1, he was recalled again by the Celtics to suit up for their home game against his former team, the Miami Heat. The next day, he signed a second 10-day contract with the Celtics. On February 5, he was reassigned to Maine, only to be recalled again five days later. Following the expiration of his second 10-day contract on February 12, he parted ways with the Celtics before appearing in a game for them. Two days later, he returned to the Sioux Falls Skyforce.

=== 2015–16 season ===
On August 13, 2015, Dawkins signed with Auxilium CUS Torino of Italy for the 2015–16 season. On March 8, 2016, he was acquired by the Texas Legends. That night, he made his debut with the Legends in a 111–93 loss to the Idaho Stampede, recording 14 points and three rebounds in 22 minutes off the bench.

=== 2016–17 season ===
After appearing in five games for the Legends and averaging 11.5 points and four rebounds per game, Dawkins was traded to the Windy City Bulls on December 1, 2016, for the returning player rights of Xavier Thames. On January 28, 2017, he was traded back to the Texas Legends.

=== 2017–18 season ===
On August 23, 2017, Dawkins was selected by the Agua Caliente Clippers in the NBA G League expansion draft.

== NBA career statistics ==
Legend
GP	Games played	GS	Games started	MPG	Minutes per game
FG%	Field goal percentage	3P%	3-point field goal percentage	FT%	Free throw percentage
RPG	Rebounds per game	APG	Assists per game	SPG	Steals per game
BPG	Blocks per game	PPG	Points per game	**Bold**	Career high

=== Regular season ===
Year	Team	GP	GS	MPG	FG%	3P%	FT%	RPG	APG	SPG	BPG	PPG
2014–15	Miami	4	0	5.5	.167	.167	.000	.5	.3	.0	.0	.8
Career		4	0	5.5	.167	.167	.000	.5	.3	.0	.0	.8
