= T. J. Ford =

American basketball player (born 1983)

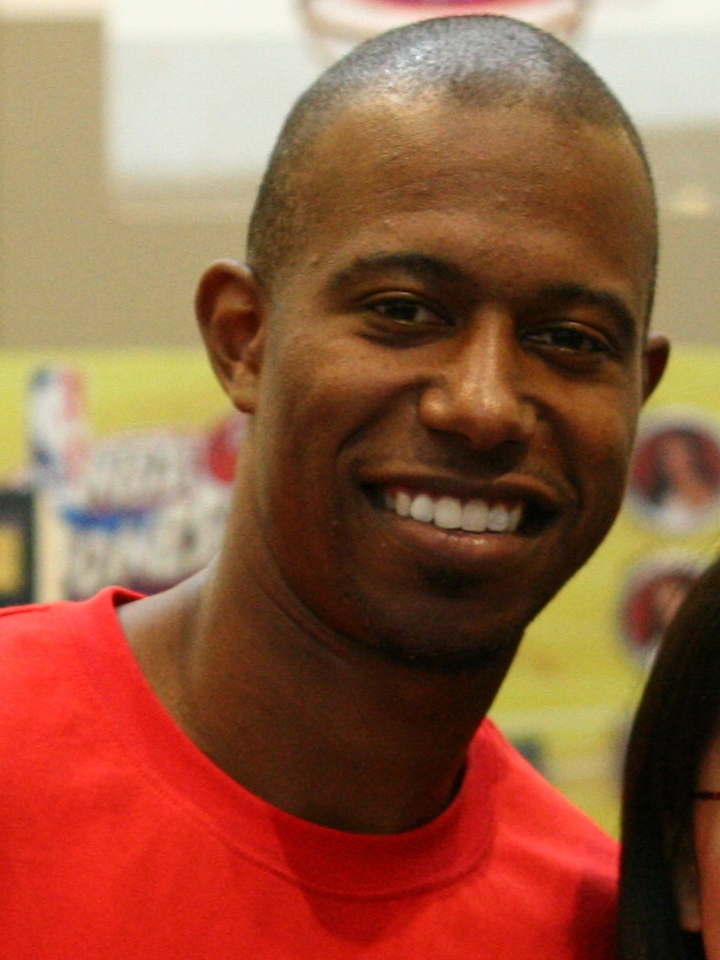
- Ford in 2011

Milwaukee Bucks
- Title: Assistant coach
- League: NBA

Personal information
- Born: March 24, 1983 (age 43) Houston, Texas, U.S.
- Listed height: 6 ft 0 in (1.83 m)
- Listed weight: 165 lb (75 kg)

Career information
- High school: Willowridge (Houston, Texas)
- College: Texas (2001–2003)
- NBA draft: 2003: 1st round, 8th overall pick
- Drafted by: Milwaukee Bucks
- Playing career: 2003–2012
- Position: Point guard
- Number: 11, 5
- Coaching career: 2026–present

Career history

Playing
- 2003–2006: Milwaukee Bucks
- 2006–2008: Toronto Raptors
- 2008–2011: Indiana Pacers
- 2011: Zagreb
- 2011–2012: San Antonio Spurs

Coaching
- 2026–present: Milwaukee Bucks (assistant)

Career highlights
- NBA All-Rookie Second Team (2004); Naismith Player of the Year (2003); John R. Wooden Award (2003); Sporting News Player of the Year (2003); Consensus first-team All-American (2003); AP Honorable mention All-American (2002); USBWA National Freshman of the Year (2002); NCAA assists leader (2002); First-team All-Big 12 (2003); Big 12 Freshman of the Year (2002); No. 11 retired by Texas Longhorns; McDonald's All-American (2001); Second-team Parade All-American (2001)

Career statistics
- Points: 4,797 (11.2 ppg)
- Rebounds: 1,331 (3.1 rpg)
- Assists: 2,495 (5.8 apg)
- Stats at NBA.com
- Stats at Basketball Reference

Terrance Jerod Ford Sr. (born March 24, 1983) is an American former professional basketball player who currently serves as an assistant coach for the Milwaukee Bucks of the National Basketball Association (NBA). Having been awarded numerous top basketball accolades in high school and college, Ford entered the 2003 NBA draft and was selected eighth overall by the Bucks. Ford's recurring back injuries resulted in him missing many games in his three seasons with the Bucks, but in 2005, it was announced that he was fit to play basketball again. Ford was traded to the Raptors prior to the 2006–07 NBA season, and established himself as the starting point guard, helping the team win the Atlantic Division crown and reach the 2007 NBA Playoffs. Following an injury sustained in the 2007–08 NBA season, however, Ford had difficulties reclaiming the starting spot and was traded to the Indiana Pacers. He signed with KK Zagreb of Croatia during the 2011 NBA lockout where he appeared in three games. On December 9, 2011, Ford signed a contract with the San Antonio Spurs.

Off the court, Ford set up the T. J. Ford Foundation in 2004 to help participants achieve their academic, personal and civil goals.

== Early life ==
I have vivid childhood memories of playing basketball in my backyard. My father would work with me on the fundamentals and my brother and I would go at it playing one on one.

— Ford

Born in Houston, Texas to Leo and Mary Ford, Terrance Jerod Ford was nicknamed "T. J." at birth by his mother. From a young age, Ford dreamed of being a basketball player, having also witnessed his home team Houston Rockets win back-to-back championships in the 1990s. Ford first played competitive basketball at Willowridge High School, and helped Willowridge to a 75–1 win–loss record (including a 62-game winning streak) in his final two seasons, earning a pair of Texas Class 5A state titles in the process. Subsequently, Ford was diagnosed with spinal stenosis, but he went on to play basketball for the Texas Longhorns for the 2001–02 and 2002–03 seasons.

In his first season at Texas, Ford not only led the team in steals and minutes per game, he became the first freshman player in NCAA history to lead the nation in assists (8.27 per game). Ford's play ensured that Texas made it to the Sweet Sixteen, while he recorded 15 double-digit assist games, and was named a consensus Big 12 Freshman of the Year. In 2003, the sophomore was third in the nation in assists (7.7 per game), and led the Longhorns in scoring, assists and steals. Ford was also the South Regional MVP while leading Texas to its first Final Four since 1947. At the end of the season, the consensus First Team All-America selection won the prestigious Naismith College Player of the Year and John Wooden awards, and was named Player of the Year by Sports Illustrated, The Sporting News, ESPN.com and CBS SportsLine. To honor Ford, his #11 jersey was retired by his university, making him the fourth University of Texas athlete in any sport (and the first basketball player) to have such an honor, joining Earl Campbell, Ricky Williams, and Roger Clemens. In 2017, he graduated from the University of Texas, earning a bachelor's degree from Texas in youth and community studies, with a minor in educational psychology.

== NBA career ==
=== Rookie season ===
Having felt he had nothing more to prove at college level, Ford decided to turn professional after his second year of college and enter the 2003 NBA draft, and was heralded by NBA.com as having "the prescient ability to see the play before it happens, like Magic Johnson and Larry Bird". Ford was picked eighth in the first round by the Milwaukee Bucks in a very strong draft class, which featured future NBA All-Stars LeBron James, Dwyane Wade, Chris Bosh and Carmelo Anthony. In his first season, he led the Bucks in assists with 6.5 assists per game, while tallying 7.1 points per game (ppg). Ford was also selected to the NBA All-Rookie 2nd Team. However, he played in only 55 games that season before an injury forced him to miss the final 26 games of the regular season and the 2004 NBA Playoffs. The injury occurred on February 24, 2004, during a home game versus the Minnesota Timberwolves where he fell on his tail bone after being fouled by center Mark Madsen. He suffered a contusion of the spinal cord, a career-threatening injury.

=== Injury woes ===
Ford sat out the entire 2004–05 season due to his spinal cord injury. In June 2005, a statement was released by Dr. Robert Watkins of the Los Angeles Spine Surgery Institute that said Ford had made a complete recovery. The point guard had trained intensively for months in his hometown of Houston under the supervision of former NBA player John Lucas; together they worked on Ford's shooting, stamina, and strength. Ford rejoined the Bucks when training camp opened, and in his first game back on the court on November 1, 2005, he was one rebound shy of a triple double (with 16 points, 14 assists and 9 rebounds in 34 minutes of play) in a 117–108 Milwaukee road win over the Philadelphia 76ers. As the season progressed Ford showed almost no effects from his injury, playing with the same intensity and hustle as he did in his rookie season. He ended the regular season with 12.2 ppg and 6.6 apg, but found that the Bucks had abandoned a fast-paced style of offense. New coach Terry Stotts was beginning to rely more on the jump shooting of Michael Redd, the post play of Andrew Bogut and Jamaal Magloire, and the playmaking of developing point guard Mo Williams, so that Ford became a less important component of the team.

=== Fresh start with the Raptors ===
In a way, all my lifelong battles with my spinal problems were a blessing in disguise. It made me appreciate the game more, that I'm still given a chance to play it at the highest level. And in every game, that always makes me want to give it everything I've got.

— Ford speaking to the Singapore press in September 2007

Following the 2005–06 season, newly appointed Toronto Raptors general manager Bryan Colangelo overhauled Toronto's roster in preparation for the 2006–07 season. He was looking for a true point guard, and acquired Ford in exchange for promising Raptors forward Charlie Villanueva. This trade was initially criticised by basketball observers as "lopsided" due to Ford's injury history, but Ford was installed as the starting point guard for the Raptors, and together with Chris Bosh, the duo formed the centerpiece of the Raptors' offense. Ford also forged a solid partnership with sophomore and fellow point guard José Calderón, the latter backing him up when Ford was injured for several games in the middle of the season. Apart from his quick speed (Ford was voted the fastest player in the NBA in a 2007 Sports Illustrated survey of 271 NBA players), Ford's clutch play was instrumental for the Raptors throughout his inaugural season. On December 20, 2006, he scored the winning basket against the Los Angeles Clippers and two days later, converted almost every shot in overtime and provided the vital assist in the win against the Portland Trail Blazers. Ford's clutch play was again evident in a 120–119 overtime win against the Seattle SuperSonics on March 11, 2007, when he scored almost all of the team's overtime points. His form continued when he equaled his career-high of 18 assists in a game against the New York Knicks on March 14, 2007 — one short of the Raptors franchise record set by Damon Stoudamire. Ford ended the 2006–07 regular season with 14.0 ppg and 7.9 apg, both career highs, and was also credited with bringing the Raptors to their first playoff berth in five years, as well as helping them clinch their first ever Division title. In the 2007 NBA Playoffs, he averaged 16.0 ppg and 4.0 apg, but Toronto lost four games to two to the New Jersey Nets in the first round.

Prior to the 2007–08 season, Ford focused on improving his turnover-to-assist ratio. When the season began, coach Sam Mitchell continued to rotate between Ford and Calderón to good effect. On December 11, 2007, following a flagrant foul committed by Al Horford, Ford suffered what appeared to be a serious injury in a game against the Atlanta Hawks. He was conscious but did not appear to move before he was strapped to a stretcher and wheeled off the court. In his absence, Calderón earned rave reviews for his performances and surpassed Ford as the starting point guard for the Raptors. However, after spending several weeks with his old trainer John Lucas in Houston, Ford made his return on February 4, 2008, to the bench. By the end of the season, there was much speculation that the Raptors would try to trade Ford, originally a central piece of the Raptors' long-term plans, and rebuild their team around the more efficient Calderón. In the 2008 NBA Playoffs, Toronto was pitted against the Orlando Magic in the first round and the perception was that Toronto's depth at the point guard position could prove to be key. While Ford played poorly in the first two games which the Raptors lost, he was pivotal in the third, bringing the series score to 2–1. The Raptors, however, were eliminated in five games, and the coaches' decision not to deploy Ford to close out games during the playoffs—coupled with Ford's subsequent alleged refusal to play backup on the team—led to further speculation about his future.

=== Moving to Indiana ===
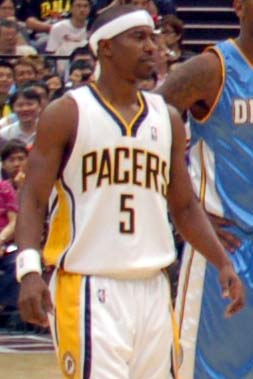
Ford with the Pacers

On the eve of the 2008 NBA draft, it was reported that the Raptors had traded Ford to the Indiana Pacers in exchange for Jermaine O'Neal and the 41st pick in the draft (Nathan Jawai). The Raptors sent Indiana Rasho Nesterovič, Maceo Baston and the 17th pick in the draft (Roy Hibbert), and because Ford's contract made him a "base-year compensation" player, the trade was only finalized on July 9, 2008. Ford got off to a good start with his new team, with the Pacers alternating between him and Jarrett Jack for the starting point guard position. While the occasional injury prevented Ford from performing at the optimal level all the time, he was able to keep up his game of attacking the basket. On February 1, 2009, he scored a career-high 36 points in a game against the New York Knicks, a week after tying his previous career-high of 34 points. However, the Pacers were eventually edged out of playoffs qualification by Detroit. The bright spot in Ford's first campaign with the Pacers was his recording of a career-best in points per game.

=== San Antonio Spurs ===
On December 9, 2011, Ford signed a contract with the San Antonio Spurs. His final NBA game was played on March 7, 2012, in a 118–105 win over the New York Knicks, where he played for 5 and half minutes and recorded a single assist. During the game, in the second quarter, Ford suffered a stinger after being elbowed in his back by Baron Davis: "If it's anybody else, it's just a regular play. But because of me and my condition a simple elbow in the back has a different outcome than hitting someone else in the back."

On March 12, 2012, after playing 14 games, he announced on Twitter that he would retire. On March 15, 2012, the Spurs traded Ford, Richard Jefferson and a 2012 first-round pick to the Golden State Warriors in exchange for Stephen Jackson. Ford was then waived by the Warriors.

== Coaching career ==
On August 7, 2026, Ford was hired to serve as an assistant coach for the Milwaukee Bucks under head coach Taylor Jenkins.

== NBA career statistics ==
Legend
GP	Games played	GS	Games started	MPG	Minutes per game
FG%	Field goal percentage	3P%	3-point field goal percentage	FT%	Free throw percentage
RPG	Rebounds per game	APG	Assists per game	SPG	Steals per game
BPG	Blocks per game	PPG	Points per game	**Bold**	Career high

=== Regular season ===
Year	Team	GP	GS	MPG	FG%	3P%	FT%	RPG	APG	SPG	BPG	PPG
2003–04	Milwaukee	55	55	26.8	.384	.238	.816	3.2	6.5	1.1	.1	7.1
2005–06	Milwaukee	72	70	**35.5**	.416	**.337**	.754	**4.3**	6.6	**1.4**	.1	12.2
2006–07	Toronto	**75**	**71**	29.9	.436	.304	.819	3.1	**7.9**	1.3	.1	12.0
2007–08	Toronto	51	26	23.5	**.469**	.294	**.880**	2.0	6.1	1.1	.0	12.1
2008–09	Indiana	74	49	30.5	.452	**.337**	.872	3.5	5.3	1.2	**.2**	**14.9**
2009–10	Indiana	47	32	25.3	.445	.160	.770	3.2	3.8	.9	**.2**	10.3
2010–11	Indiana	41	3	18.9	.386	.188	.729	2.0	3.4	.9	**.2**	5.9
2011–12	San Antonio	14	0	13.6	.442	.250	.786	1.3	3.2	.6	.1	3.6
Career		429	306	27.7	.433	.289	.815	3.1	5.8	1.2	.1	11.2

=== Playoffs ===
Year	Team	GP	GS	MPG	FG%	3P%	FT%	RPG	APG	SPG	BPG	PPG
2006	Milwaukee	5	**5**	**32.4**	.490	.400	.917	4.0	6.4	.6	.0	12.6
2007	Toronto	**6**	**5**	22.7	.487	.500	.810	1.7	4.0	**1.2**	**.3**	**16.0**
2008	Toronto	5	**5**	24.8	.362	.125	**.938**	**4.4**	**6.6**	1.0	.0	11.6
2011	Indiana	2	0	7.0	**1.000**	**1.000**	.000	.5	1.0	.0	.0	3.5
Career		18	15	24.2	.457	.375	.878	2.9	5.1	.8	.1	12.4

== Croatia ==
During the 2011 NBA lockout, Ford signed to play with KK Zagreb of Croatia. He played in two EuroLeague games. First one was with Brose Baskets in Zagreb Arena and the second one was against Panathinaikos in O.A.C.A. Olympic Indoor Hall, Athens. He also played in one Adriatic League game, against Radnički in Jezero Hall, Kragujevac.

== Off the court ==
Ford started the T. J. Ford Foundation in September 2004, an organization that seeks to enhance individuals through programs designed to develop their educational, recreational, physical and social well-being in collaboration with family and community. The Foundation has a presence in Texas and Wisconsin.
