= 2002 NCAA Men's Basketball All-Americans =

- Awarded for: 2001–02 NCAA Division I men's basketball season

The Consensus 2002 College Basketball All-American team, as determined by aggregating the results of four major All-American teams. To earn "consensus" status, a player must win honors from a majority of the following teams: the Associated Press, the USBWA, The Sporting News and the National Association of Basketball Coaches.

== 2002 Consensus All-America team ==
Consensus First Team
Player	Position	Class	Team
Dan Dickau	G	Senior	Gonzaga
Juan Dixon	G	Senior	Maryland
Drew Gooden	C	Junior	Kansas
Steve Logan	G	Senior	Cincinnati
Jason Williams	G	Junior	Duke

Consensus Second Team
Player	Position	Class	Team
Sam Clancy Jr.	F	Senior	Southern California
Mike Dunleavy Jr.	F	Junior	Duke
Casey Jacobsen	G-F	Junior	Stanford
Jared Jeffries	F	Sophomore	Indiana
David West	F	Junior	Xavier

== Individual All-America teams ==
All-America Team
All-America Team	First team		Second team		Third team	
All-America Team	Player	School	Player	School	Player	School
Associated Press	Dan Dickau	Gonzaga	Sam Clancy	Southern California	Carlos Boozer	Duke
Associated Press	Juan Dixon	Maryland	Mike Dunleavy Jr.	Duke	Erwin Dudley	Alabama
Associated Press	Drew Gooden	Kansas	Casey Jacobsen	Stanford	Jason Gardner	Arizona
Associated Press	Steve Logan	Cincinnati	Jared Jeffries	Indiana	Brandin Knight	Pittsburgh
Associated Press	Jason Williams	Duke	David West	Xavier	Tayshaun Prince	Kentucky
USBWA	Dan Dickau	Gonzaga	Sam Clancy	Southern California	No third team	
USBWA	Juan Dixon	Maryland	Mike Dunleavy Jr.	Duke	No third team	
USBWA	Drew Gooden	Kansas	Casey Jacobsen	Stanford	No third team	
USBWA	Steve Logan	Cincinnati	Jared Jeffries	Indiana	No third team	
USBWA	Jason Williams	Duke	David West	Xavier	No third team	
NABC	Juan Dixon	Maryland	Dan Dickau	Gonzaga	Carlos Boozer	Duke
NABC	Mike Dunleavy Jr.	Duke	Udonis Haslem	Florida	Sam Clancy	Southern California
NABC	Drew Gooden	Kansas	Casey Jacobsen	Stanford	Jason Gardner	Arizona
NABC	Steve Logan	Cincinnati	Jared Jeffries	Indiana	Kirk Hinrich	Kansas
NABC	Jason Williams	Duke	Tayshaun Prince	Kentucky	David West	Xavier
Sporting News	Dan Dickau	Gonzaga	Caron Butler	Connecticut	Kirk Hinrich	Kansas
Sporting News	Juan Dixon	Maryland	Sam Clancy	Southern California	Jared Jeffries	Indiana
Sporting News	Drew Gooden	Kansas	Mike Dunleavy Jr.	Duke	Hollis Price	Oklahoma
Sporting News	Steve Logan	Cincinnati	Brandin Knight	Pittsburgh	Dwyane Wade	Marquette
Sporting News	Jason Williams	Duke	Luke Walton	Arizona	David West	Xavier

AP Honorable Mention:

- Tommy Adams, Hampton
- Luboš Bartoň, Valparaiso
- Lonny Baxter, Maryland
- Troy Bell, Boston College
- Steve Blake, Maryland
- Brett Blizzard, UNC Wilmington
- Matt Bonner, Florida
- Curtis Borchardt, Stanford
- Caron Butler, Connecticut
- Nick Collison, Kansas
- Jason Conley, VMI
- Josh Davis, Wyoming
- Patrick Doctor, American
- Henry Domercant, Eastern Illinois
- Corsley Edwards, Central Connecticut
- Melvin Ely, Fresno State
- Jason Erickson, Montana State
- Reggie Evans, Iowa
- T. J. Ford, Texas
- Jerry Green, UC Irvine
- Lynn Greer, Temple
- Rod Grizzard, Alabama
- Anthony Grundy, NC State
- Udonis Haslem, Florida
- Rylan Hainje, Butler
- Jarvis Hayes, Georgia
- Paul Haynes, Grambling State
- Kirk Hinrich, Kansas
- Fred Jones, Oregon
- Jason Kapono, UCLA
- Kyle Korver, Creighton
- Greg Lewis, Winthrop
- John Linehan, Providence
- Chris Marcus, Western Kentucky
- Keith McLeod, Bowling Green
- Ugonna Onyekwe, Penn
- Mario Porter, Rider
- McEverett Powers, UTSA
- Hollis Price, Oklahoma
- Luke Recker, Iowa
- Luke Ridnour, Oregon
- Héctor Romero, New Orleans
- Kareem Rush, Missouri
- Predrag Savović, Hawaii
- Preston Shumpert, Syracuse
- Darius Songaila, Wake Forest
- T. J. Sorrentine, Vermont
- Thomas Terrell, Georgia State
- Dwyane Wade, Marquette
- Dajuan Wagner, Memphis
- Luke Walton, Arizona
- Frank Williams, Illinois
