= Rasho Nesterović =

Slovenian basketball player (born 1976)

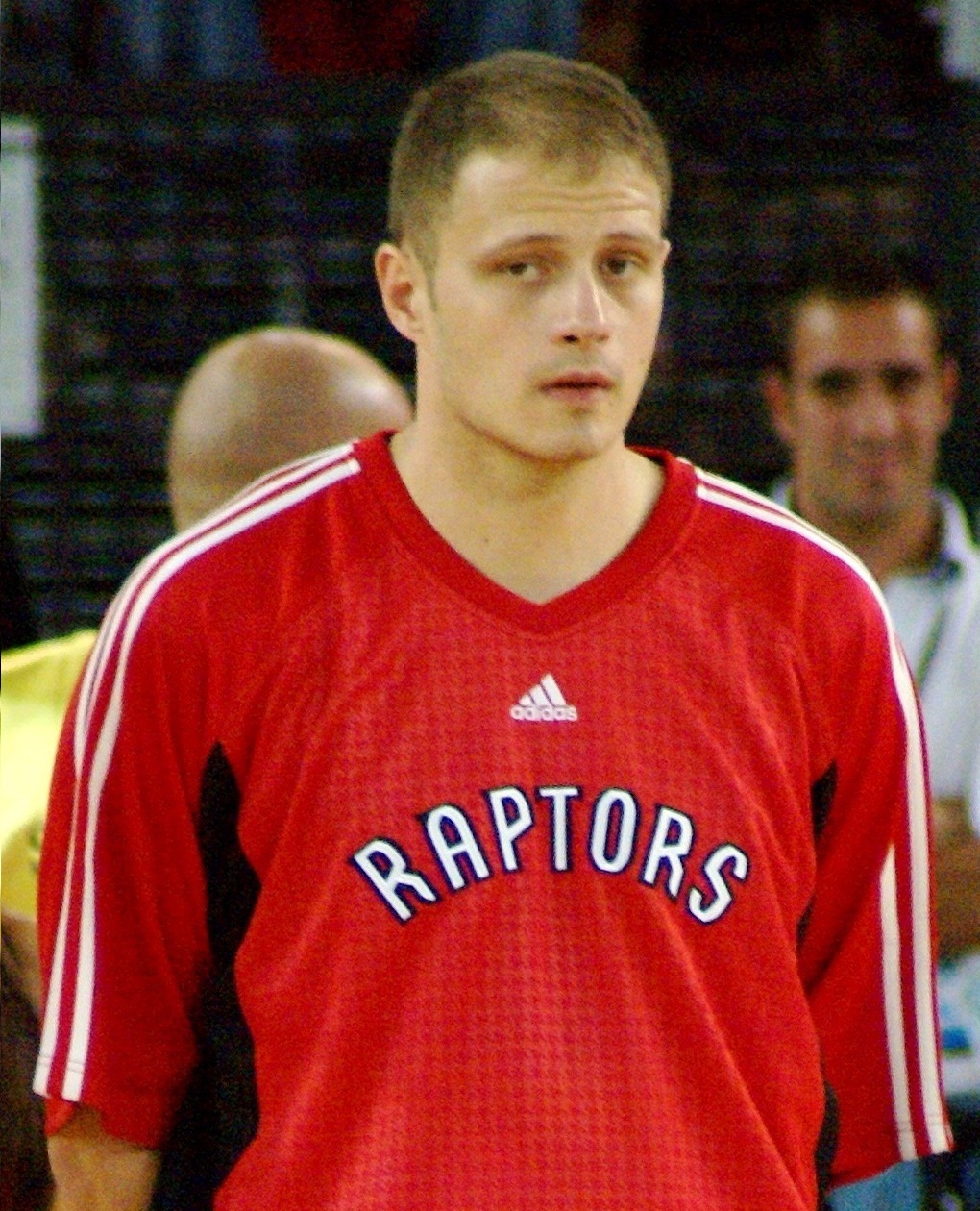
- Nesterović with the Toronto Raptors in 2007

Personal information
- Born: May 30, 1976 (age 50) Ljubljana, SR Slovenia, SFR Yugoslavia
- Listed height: 7 ft 0 in (2.13 m)
- Listed weight: 255 lb (116 kg)

Career information
- NBA draft: 1998: 1st round, 17th overall pick
- Drafted by: Minnesota Timberwolves
- Playing career: 1992–2011
- Position: Center
- Number: 8, 12

Career history
- 1992–1993: Partizan
- 1993–1995: PAOK
- 1995–1997: Union Olimpija
- 1997–1999: Virtus Bologna
- 1999–2003: Minnesota Timberwolves
- 2003–2006: San Antonio Spurs
- 2006–2008: Toronto Raptors
- 2008–2009: Indiana Pacers
- 2009–2010: Toronto Raptors
- 2010–2011: Olympiacos

Career highlights
- NBA champion (2005); EuroLeague champion (1998); FIBA EuroStar (1998); LBA champion (1998); Italian Cup winner (1999); Greek Cup winner (2011); 2× Slovenian League champion (1996, 1997); Slovenian Cup winner (1997); FIBA Europe U20 Championship MVP (1996)

Career NBA statistics
- Points: 5,519 (6.8 ppg)
- Rebounds: 4,143 (5.1 rpg)
- Blocks: 934 (1.2 bpg)
- Stats at NBA.com
- Stats at Basketball Reference

Radoslav "Rasho" Nesterović (Serbian Cyrillic: Радослав "Рашо" Нестеровић, Greek: Ράσο Νεστέροβιτς, Slovene: Radoslav "Rašo" Nesterovič; born May 30, 1976) is a Slovenian former professional basketball player. He holds citizenship in both Slovenia and Greece. During his career in the NBA, Nesterović played for the Minnesota Timberwolves, San Antonio Spurs, Indiana Pacers, and Toronto Raptors. He retired in 2011.

== Playing career ==
=== Early life and career in Europe ===
Nesterović was born in Ljubljana, SR Slovenia, SFR Yugoslavia to father Čedo, a Bosnian Serb employee of the Slovenian Railways, and a mother Branka, a midwife in the Ljubljana University Medical Centre. He started playing basketball with the KD Slovan youth team. Later, he played with the junior club of KK Partizan and made his debut during the 1992–93 season.

=== PAOK ===
During the Yugoslav wars, Nesterović moved to PAOK of the Greek League. While playing there, he obtained a second citizenship (Greek) to avoid EU restrictions. To obtain Greek citizenship he had to administratively change his name in the eyes of Greek law. While in Greece and other EU countries, he thus competed as a domestic player under the name Radoslav "Rasho" Makris.

=== Olimpija Ljubljana ===
Ahead of the 1995–96 season, Nesterović returned to his hometown to play for Union Olimpija. Competing in the Slovenian domestic league, his averages were 30 minutes, 17 points and 14 rebounds per game. The summer of 1996 off season brought another significant feat for Nesterović; while playing for Slovenia's youth national team he was named the MVP at the 1996 FIBA Europe Under-20 Championship. The next season, 1996–97, he was part of that legendary Olimpija team that reached the 1997 EuroLeague Final Four in Rome. In that season, he played an average of 17.0 minutes per game, averaging 8.0 points, and 4.3 rebounds per game in the EuroLeague.

=== Virtus Bologna ===
The exposure on the biggest European stage led to a big time move for Nesterović to the Italian League power Virtus (Kinder) Bologna during the summer of 1997. In the first season with his new club, he scored an average of 8 points and grabbed an average of 6 rebounds per game, in the Italian domestic league. In the EuroLeague, he scored 6.5 points and grabbed 6.0 rebounds per game. He helped Virtus win the EuroLeague title, playing alongside legendary players such as Sasha Danilović, Zoran Savić, and Antoine Rigaudeau. In the EuroLeague Final, Nesterović scored 6 points and grabbed 9 rebounds.

=== NBA debut: Minnesota Timberwolves ===
Nesterović was a first-round draft pick (17th overall) of the Minnesota Timberwolves in the 1998 NBA draft. He joined the Timberwolves just before the end of the 1998–99 season and played there through the 2002–03 season.

Nesterović stayed in Minnesota for four full seasons because he played only the last two regular-season games, plus all of his team's games in the playoffs, in his first season. His best season with the Timberwolves was 2002–03, when he averaged 11.2 points and 6.6 rebounds per game, earning himself a 6-year contract with the San Antonio Spurs in 2004. Although the Timberwolves were offering him a contract worth $12 million more, Nesterović opted for the move to Texas for a shot at the NBA title.

=== San Antonio Spurs ===
In his first season with San Antonio, Nesterović scored 8.7 points per game and grabbed 7.7 rebounds per game. In his second season with the Spurs, 2004–05, he suffered an ankle injury, and was limited to 70 games. Nevertheless, he remained the starting center for the majority of the season, and, along with his colleague from the Slovenian national basketball team, Beno Udrih, he ultimately won an NBA title with the Spurs that year.

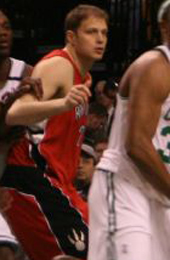
Nesterović with the Toronto Raptors

=== Toronto Raptors ===
On June 21, 2006, Nesterović was traded to the Toronto Raptors along with cash in exchange for Matt Bonner, Eric Williams and a second-round pick in the 2009 NBA draft. In his first season with the Raptors, he averaged 6.2 points, 4.5 rebounds, and 1.0 blocks per game.

On April 2, 2008, at 7:34 pm EST, Nesterović hit his first three-point shot ever in the regular season, with a pump fake, for a buzzer beater against the Atlanta Hawks, in Atlanta.

While playing for the Raptors, he was nicknamed Nestea as the fans found it "refreshing to have a true center."

=== Indiana Pacers ===
On July 9, 2008, Nesterović was traded along with the Raptors' T. J. Ford, Maceo Baston and the 17th pick in the draft (Roy Hibbert) to the Indiana Pacers, in exchange for Jermaine O'Neal and the 41st pick in the draft (Nathan Jawai).

=== Toronto Raptors (second stint) ===
On July 30, 2009, Nesterović officially was signed by the Toronto Raptors, reportedly with the biannual exception of $1.9 million for one season.

=== Return to Europe: Olympiacos ===
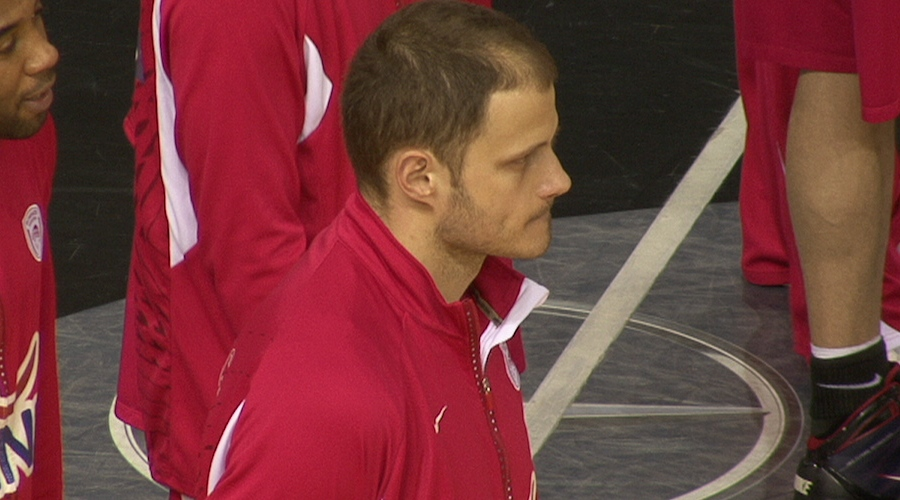
Nesterović with Olympiacos in 2011

For the 2010–11 season Nesterović returned to Europe, when he signed a two-year contract with the Greek League powerhouse Olympiacos. He was released by Olympiacos in July 2011.

== National team career ==
Nesterović was the captain of the senior men's Slovenian national basketball team until his retirement from the national team in 2008. He helped his national team finish in 6th place at the EuroBasket 2005 in Belgrade, and to thus secure a place at the 2006 FIBA World Championship. At the EuroBasket 2005, he played an average of 21.7 minutes, scored an average of 6 points, and grabbed an average of 6.2 rebounds per game.

== Post-playing career ==
Nesterović was a Secretary-General of the Basketball Federation of Slovenia from November 3, 2014, until his resignation on July 11, 2023. In 2015, he was elected a member of the FIBA commission of players.

== Personal life ==
Nesterović has a sister and five children. He is the godfather to Luka Dončić, the third pick of the 2018 NBA draft. He speaks Serbian, Slovenian, Italian, Greek, and English.

== NBA career statistics ==
Legend
GP	Games played	GS	Games started	MPG	Minutes per game
FG%	Field goal percentage	3P%	3-point field goal percentage	FT%	Free throw percentage
RPG	Rebounds per game	APG	Assists per game	SPG	Steals per game
BPG	Blocks per game	PPG	Points per game	**Bold**	Career high
†	Won an NBA championship

=== Regular season ===
Year	Team	GP	GS	MPG	FG%	3P%	FT%	RPG	APG	SPG	BPG	PPG
1998–99	Minnesota	2	0	15.0	.250	.000	**1.000**	4.0	.5	.0	.0	4.0
1999–00	Minnesota	**82**	55	21.0	.476	.000	.573	4.6	1.1	.3	1.0	5.7
2000–01	Minnesota	73	39	16.9	.461	.000	.523	3.9	.6	.3	.9	4.5
2001–02	Minnesota	**82**	**82**	27.0	.493	.000	.549	6.5	.9	.5	1.3	8.4
2002–03	Minnesota	77	77	**30.4**	.525	.000	.642	6.5	1.5	.5	1.5	**11.2**
2003–04	San Antonio	**82**	**82**	28.7	.469	.000	.474	**7.7**	1.4	**.6**	**2.0**	8.7
2004–05†	San Antonio	70	70	25.5	.460	.000	.467	6.6	1.0	.4	1.7	5.9
2005–06	San Antonio	80	51	18.9	.515	.000	.600	3.9	.4	.3	1.1	4.5
2006–07	Toronto	80	73	21.0	.546	.000	.680	4.5	.9	.5	1.1	6.2
2007–08	Toronto	71	39	20.9	**.550**	**.333**	.755	4.8	1.2	.3	.7	7.8
2008–09	Indiana	70	19	17.3	.513	.000	.781	3.4	**1.6**	.4	.5	6.8
2009–10	Toronto	42	8	9.8	.544	.000	.200	2.1	.6	.2	.4	3.9
Career		811	595	22.2	.502	.077	.585	5.1	1.0	.4	1.2	6.8

=== Playoffs ===
Year	Team	GP	GS	MPG	FG%	3P%	FT%	RPG	APG	SPG	BPG	PPG
1999	Minnesota	3	0	9.7	.500	.000	.000	2.3	1.0	.0	.0	2.7
2000	Minnesota	4	4	**31.5**	.440	.000	.500	3.3	**1.5**	**.8**	**1.8**	6.3
2001	Minnesota	4	2	12.3	.385	.000	.000	3.0	.8	.3	.8	2.5
2002	Minnesota	3	3	30.7	.484	.000	.444	**6.7**	1.0	.3	.0	**11.3**
2003	Minnesota	6	6	28.2	.500	.000	.667	5.0	.7	.2	.7	7.0
2004	San Antonio	10	**10**	26.1	.433	.000	.167	5.5	1.0	.3	1.1	5.9
2005†	San Antonio	**15**	0	7.6	.417	.000	.000	1.7	.1	.1	.3	.7
2006	San Antonio	9	1	12.7	**.579**	**1.000**	**1.000**	3.3	.1	.2	.6	2.8
2007	Toronto	5	4	14.2	.467	.000	**1.000**	4.6	.6	.0	.4	3.4
2008	Toronto	5	2	15.4	.500	.000	.500	2.6	.6	.2	.4	4.6
Career		64	32	17.2	.468	.500	.500	3.6	.6	.2	.6	4.0
