= Mike Dunleavy Jr. =

American basketball player (born 1980)

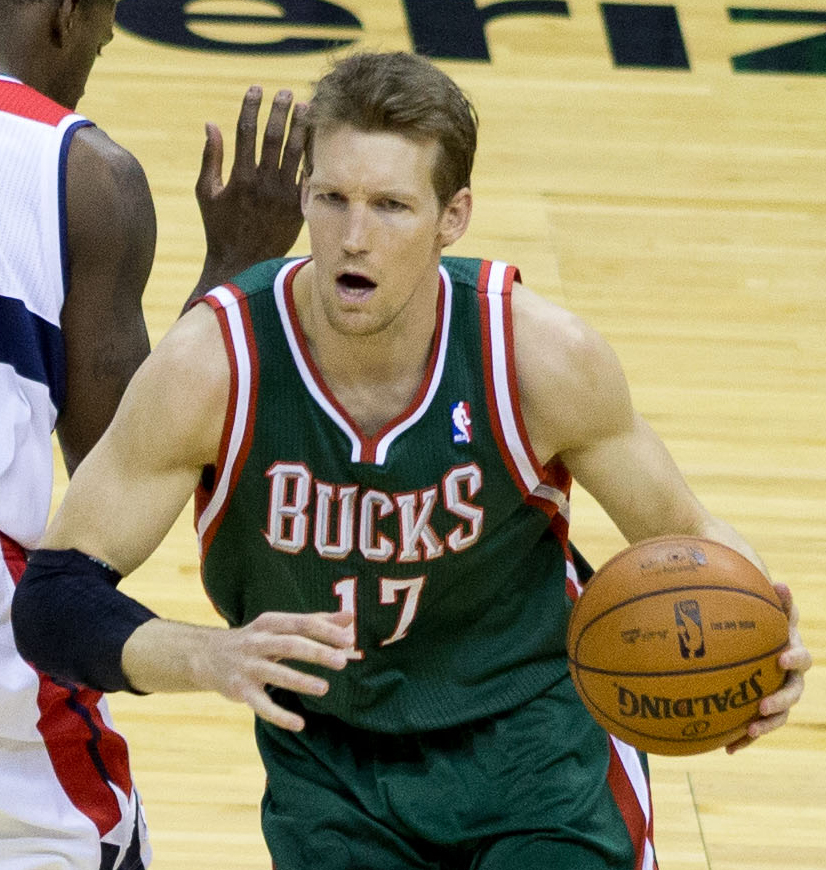
- Dunleavy with the Milwaukee Bucks in 2013

Golden State Warriors
- Title: General manager
- League: NBA

Personal information
- Born: September 15, 1980 (age 46) Fort Worth, Texas, U.S.
- Listed height: 6 ft 9 in (2.06 m)
- Listed weight: 230 lb (104 kg)

Career information
- High school: Jesuit (Beaverton, Oregon)
- College: Duke (1999–2002)
- NBA draft: 2002: 1st round, 3rd overall pick
- Drafted by: Golden State Warriors
- Playing career: 2002–2017
- Position: Small forward / shooting guard
- Number: 10, 34, 17, 3

Career history
- 2002–2007: Golden State Warriors
- 2007–2011: Indiana Pacers
- 2011–2013: Milwaukee Bucks
- 2013–2016: Chicago Bulls
- 2016–2017: Cleveland Cavaliers
- 2017: Atlanta Hawks

Career highlights
- As player: NCAA champion (2001); Consensus second-team All-American (2002); First-team All-ACC (2002); McDonald's All-American (1999); Third-team Parade All-American (1999); As executive: NBA champion (2022)
- Stats at NBA.com
- Stats at Basketball Reference

Michael Joseph Dunleavy Jr. (born September 15, 1980) is an American professional basketball executive and former player who is the general manager for the Golden State Warriors of the National Basketball Association (NBA). He played college basketball for the Duke Blue Devils, earning consensus second-team All-American honors in 2002. Dunleavy was selected by Golden State with the third overall pick of the 2002 NBA draft. He played in the NBA for the Warriors, Indiana Pacers, Milwaukee Bucks, Chicago Bulls, Cleveland Cavaliers and Atlanta Hawks. He is the son of former NBA player and head coach Mike Dunleavy Sr.

== High school career ==
As a 1999 graduate of Jesuit High School in Beaverton, Oregon, Dunleavy led them to the 1999 4A State Boys Basketball Championship over North Salem High School, 65–38. Dunleavy attended the University School of Milwaukee for his freshman year, and Homestead High School in Mequon, Wisconsin for his sophomore year.

== College career ==
Dunleavy played at Duke University from 1999 to 2002. As a sophomore, he played on Duke's national championship team and scored a team-high 21 points in the title game, including 3 three-pointers during a decisive 11–2 second-half Duke run. As a junior, Dunleavy was a first-team NABC All-American, averaging 17.3 points per game and 7.2 rebounds per game for the 31–4 Blue Devils.

In 2001–02, Dunleavy, Jay Williams, and Carlos Boozer each scored at least 600 points for the season, a feat only matched at Duke by Jon Scheyer, Kyle Singler, and Nolan Smith in the 2009–10 season.

== Professional career ==
=== Golden State Warriors (2002–2007) ===
Dunleavy was selected by the Golden State Warriors third overall in the 2002 NBA draft.

In November 2005, the Warriors signed Dunleavy to a 5-year, $44 million contract extension. During the 2005–06 season, Dunleavy lost his starting role as small forward for a number of games, due partly to a shooting slump. He won back the starting job later in the season and was expected to start at his new position of power forward for the 2006–07 season. Some early struggles, however, prompted Warriors head coach Don Nelson to send Dunleavy back to the bench, juggling his lineup in search of better team chemistry and winning results.

=== Indiana Pacers (2007–2011) ===
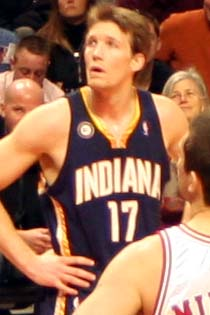
Dunleavy in 2009 with Indiana

On January 17, 2007, Dunleavy was dealt to the Indiana Pacers along with teammates Troy Murphy, Ike Diogu, and Keith McLeod for Stephen Jackson, Al Harrington, Šarūnas Jasikevičius, and Josh Powell. In his first full season with the Pacers, Dunleavy started all 82 games and averaged a career-high 19.1 points per game.

During the 2010–2011 season, the Indiana Pacers advanced to the NBA playoffs for the first time since 2006 thanks to a regular-season finale win over the Washington Wizards coupled with a Charlotte Bobcats loss to the Orlando Magic. Dunleavy scored 14 points in the 136–112 victory. Dunleavy also ended his career playoff drought of nine years and 624 games. He was the second-active leader in this category behind former Warriors and Pacers teammate Troy Murphy, who also ended his drought as a part of the Boston Celtics.

=== Milwaukee Bucks (2011–2013) ===
Following the 2011 NBA lockout, Dunleavy signed a two-year, $7.5 million contract with the Milwaukee Bucks on December 10. His best game as a Buck came on November 3, 2012, when he recorded 28 points and 13 rebounds against the Cleveland Cavaliers.

=== Chicago Bulls (2013–2016) ===
On July 10, 2013, Dunleavy signed with the Chicago Bulls, on a reported two-year deal worth about $6 million.

On April 25, 2014, Dunleavy set a playoff career-high 35 points including a franchise playoff record for most three-point field goals with 8 against the Washington Wizards in game three of their 2014 NBA Playoffs first round match-up, which the Bulls won 100–97.

Dunleavy injured his right ankle against the Denver Nuggets on January 1, 2015, and was sidelined for over a month.

On July 14, 2015, Dunleavy re-signed with the Bulls to a reported three-year, $14.4 million contract. After missing the Bulls' first 16 games of the season due to a back injury, he was ruled out for a further four-to-six weeks on December 3 due to the injury requiring additional rehabilitation.

After appearing to throw punches at the Bucks' Michael Carter-Williams in a decisive game 6 in round one of the 2015 playoffs − which the Bulls won 120–66, eliminating the Bucks − Giannis Antetokounmpo of the Bucks retaliated against Dunleavy's "dirty" play with a hard foul, leading to Antetokounmpo being ejected from the game. Since, Dunleavy has been perhaps the most hated current or former player among fans of the Bucks, with the vulgar initialism "FMD" being commonly used online.

On February 1, 2016, using the flexible assignment rule, Dunleavy was assigned to the Santa Cruz Warriors, the D-League affiliate of the Golden State Warriors, with the goal to practice there during the Bulls' West Coast road trip. Two days later, he was recalled by the Bulls. On February 6, Dunleavy made his season debut for the Bulls after missing the first 49 games. He played 14 minutes and scored five points in a 112–105 loss to the Minnesota Timberwolves.

=== Cleveland Cavaliers (2016–2017) ===
On July 7, 2016, Dunleavy was traded, along with the rights to Vladimir Veremeenko, to the Cleveland Cavaliers in exchange for the rights to Albert Miralles. He made his debut for the Cavaliers in the team's season opener on October 25, 2016, against the New York Knicks. In 22 minutes off the bench, he recorded four points, four rebounds, two assists and three steals in a 117–88 win. On December 23, 2016, he scored a season-high 14 points in a 119–99 win over the Brooklyn Nets.

=== Atlanta Hawks (2017) ===
On January 7, 2017, Dunleavy was traded, along with Mo Williams and a future first-round draft pick, to the Atlanta Hawks in exchange for Kyle Korver. After Dunleavy initially refused to report to the Hawks while seeking a buyout of his contract, he changed his mind and agreed to join the team. On January 10, he reported to the team and passed his physical. Three days later, he made his debut for the Hawks, scoring six points on a pair of three-pointers in a 103–101 loss to the Boston Celtics. On January 15, he scored 20 points off the bench in a 111–98 win over the Milwaukee Bucks. It was his first 20-point performance since a first-round playoff game for Chicago on April 30, 2015. On March 3, 2017, Dunleavy was diagnosed with right ankle synovitis. He returned to action on March 22 against Washington after a 13-game injury layoff.

Dunleavy's final NBA game was Game 6 of the 2017 Eastern Conference First Round on April 28, 2017, in a 99–115 loss to the Washington Wizards. In his final game, Dunleavy only played for 71 seconds, substituting towards the end of the first quarter for Tim Hardaway Jr. He would subsequently sit out the rest of the game, as the Hawks went on to lose the game and the series to Washington 4–2. On June 30, 2017, he was waived by the Hawks, and retired shortly afterwards.

== Executive career ==
On September 24, 2018, Dunleavy was hired by the Golden State Warriors as a pro scout. On August 29, 2019, Dunleavy was promoted to assistant general manager of the Warriors. On September 30, 2021, Dunleavy was promoted to vice president of basketball operations. He won his first NBA championship after the Warriors defeated the Boston Celtics in six games in the 2022 NBA Finals. On June 16, 2023, Dunleavy was promoted to general manager of the Warriors following Bob Myers' subsequent step down from the position.

== Personal life ==
Dunleavy has two younger brothers: Baker, who played at Villanova from 2002 to 2006 and is the former head coach at Quinnipiac; and James, who was a walk-on for USC and is currently an NBA player agent. His father is Mike Dunleavy Sr., former Los Angeles Clippers and Portland Trail Blazers coach, retired NBA player, and the former head coach at Tulane. While growing up, Dunleavy attended a residential sports camp in Eagle River, Wisconsin called Camp Menominee. In 2008, Camp Menominee honored Dunleavy by naming its basketball courts "The Mike Dunleavy Jr. Courts".

== NBA career statistics ==
Legend
GP	Games played	GS	Games started	MPG	Minutes per game
FG%	Field goal percentage	3P%	3-point field goal percentage	FT%	Free throw percentage
RPG	Rebounds per game	APG	Assists per game	SPG	Steals per game
BPG	Blocks per game	PPG	Points per game	**Bold**	Career high
*	Led the league

=== Regular season ===
Year	Team	GP	GS	MPG	FG%	3P%	FT%	RPG	APG	SPG	BPG	PPG
2002–03	Golden State	**82***	3	15.9	.403	.347	.780	2.6	1.3	.6	.2	5.7
2003–04	Golden State	75	69	31.1	.449	.370	.741	**5.9**	2.9	.9	.2	11.7
2004–05	Golden State	79	79	32.5	.451	.388	.779	5.5	2.6	1.0	.3	13.4
2005–06	Golden State	81	68	31.8	.406	.285	.778	4.9	2.9	.7	.4	11.5
2006–07	Golden State	39	6	26.9	.449	.346	.772	4.8	3.0	1.0	.3	11.4
2006–07	Indiana	43	43	35.6	.454	.283	.792	5.7	2.6	**1.1**	.2	14.0
2007–08	Indiana	**82***	**82***	**36.0**	**.476**	.424	.834	5.2	**3.5**	1.0	.4	**19.1**
2008–09	Indiana	18	14	27.5	.401	.356	.815	3.8	2.4	.7	.5	15.1
2009–10	Indiana	67	15	22.2	.410	.318	.842	3.5	1.5	.6	.2	9.9
2010–11	Indiana	61	44	27.6	.462	.402	.800	4.5	1.7	.7	.5	11.2
2011–12	Milwaukee	55	3	26.3	.474	.399	.811	3.7	2.1	.5	.1	12.3
2012–13	Milwaukee	75	3	25.9	.442	.428	.820	3.9	1.9	.5	.5	10.5
2013–14	Chicago	**82***	61	31.5	.430	.380	**.854**	4.2	2.3	.8	**.6**	11.3
2014–15	Chicago	63	63	29.2	.435	.407	.805	3.9	1.8	.6	.3	9.4
2015–16	Chicago	31	30	22.7	.410	.394	.784	2.7	1.3	.5	.3	7.2
2016–17	Cleveland	23	2	15.9	.400	.351	.737	2.0	.9	.3	.1	4.6
2016–17	Atlanta	30	0	15.8	.438	**.429**	.846	2.3	1.0	.3	.2	5.6
Career		986	585	27.7	.441	.377	.803	4.3	2.2	.7	.3	11.2

=== Playoffs ===
Year	Team	GP	GS	MPG	FG%	3P%	FT%	RPG	APG	SPG	BPG	PPG
2011	Indiana	5	0	14.4	.350	.300	.667	1.2	1.6	**.8**	.0	5.0
2013	Milwaukee	4	0	22.8	**.567**	.438	.889	**4.0**	2.0	.5	.0	12.3
2014	Chicago	5	5	**32.6**	.472	.462	.667	3.6	2.4	.6	.2	**13.2**
2015	Chicago	**12**	**12**	32.4	.489	**.482**	.947	**4.0**	**2.6**	**.8**	**.4**	10.9
2017	Atlanta	6	0	8.8	.429	.400	**1.000**	.8	.3	.2	.0	2.0
Career		32	17	24.0	.480	.451	.840	2.9	1.9	.6	.2	8.8

== See also ==
- List of second-generation NBA players
