= 2008–09 Indiana Pacers season =

NBA professional basketball team season

- Head coach: Jim O'Brien
- General manager: Larry Bird
- Arena: Conseco Fieldhouse

Results
- Record: 36–46 (.439)
- Place: Division: 4th (Central); Conference: 9th (Eastern)
- Playoff finish: Did not qualify
- Stats at Basketball Reference

Local media
- Television: Fox Sports Indiana
- Radio: WFNI

The 2008–09 Indiana Pacers season was Indiana's 42nd season as a franchise and 33rd season in the NBA.

== Key dates ==
- June 26: The 2008 NBA draft took place in Madison Square Garden, New York.
- July 1: The free agency period started.

== Offseason ==
On July 9 the Pacers officially announced they had made two trades, the most notable being the trade of former All Star forward Jermaine O'Neal in exchange for Toronto Raptors players T. J. Ford, Rasho Nesterovic, Maceo Baston and Roy Hibbert who was the 17th pick on the 2008 NBA draft. The Raptors also received Nathan Jawai who was the 41st pick in the draft. Also in a trade with the Portland Trail Blazers, the Pacers acquired Jarrett Jack, Josh McRoberts and Brandon Rush who was the 13th pick in the draft. The Pacers traded away Ike Diogu and Jerryd Bayless who was the 11th pick in the draft. With the Pacers missing the playoffs for the last two seasons and reaching just the first round before that, a change was needed in Indianapolis. Having been with the Pacers for the past eight years, O'Neal's tenure was marred by numerous injuries which saw him miss 40 games last season and 31 during the 2005–06 season.

== Draft picks ==
- The 6-foot-10 Nathan Jawai is the first indigenous player from Australia to be drafted by an NBA team.

Round	Pick	Player	Position	Nationality	College
1	11	Jerryd Bayless (Traded to Portland)	Point guard	United States	Arizona
2	41	Nathan Jawai (Traded to Toronto)	Power forward	Australia	Cairns Taipans

== Roster ==
Indiana Pacers roster
Players

Pos.	No.	Player	Height	Weight	DOB	From
PF	9	Maceo Baston	6 ft 10 in (2.08 m)	230 lb (104 kg)		Michigan
SG	6	Marquis Daniels	6 ft 6 in (1.98 m)	200 lb (91 kg)		Auburn
PG	12	Travis Diener	6 ft 1 in (1.85 m)	175 lb (79 kg)		Marquette
SF	17	Mike Dunleavy Jr.	6 ft 9 in (2.06 m)	230 lb (104 kg)		Duke
PG	5	T. J. Ford	6 ft 0 in (1.83 m)	165 lb (75 kg)		Texas
C	10	Jeff Foster	6 ft 11 in (2.11 m)	250 lb (113 kg)		Texas State
SG	23	Stephen Graham	6 ft 6 in (1.98 m)	215 lb (98 kg)		Oklahoma State
SF	33	Danny Granger	6 ft 9 in (2.06 m)	228 lb (103 kg)		New Mexico
C	55	Roy Hibbert	7 ft 2 in (2.18 m)	278 lb (126 kg)		Georgetown
PG	1	Jarrett Jack	6 ft 3 in (1.91 m)	197 lb (89 kg)		Georgia Tech
PF	32	Josh McRoberts	6 ft 10 in (2.08 m)	240 lb (109 kg)		Duke
PF	3	Troy Murphy	6 ft 11 in (2.11 m)	245 lb (111 kg)		Notre Dame
C	8	Rasho Nesterović	7 ft 0 in (2.13 m)	255 lb (116 kg)		Slovenia
SG	25	Brandon Rush	6 ft 6 in (1.98 m)	210 lb (95 kg)		Kansas
PG	11	Jamaal Tinsley	6 ft 3 in (1.91 m)	185 lb (84 kg)		Iowa State

Coaches
Head coach
- Jim O'Brien (Saint Joseph's)
Assistant(s)
- Dick Harter (Penn)
- Lester Conner (Oregon State)
- Dan Burke (Portland State)
- Frank Vogel (Kentucky)
- Jay DeFruscio (Ursinus)

Legend
- (DP) Unsigned draft pick
- (FA) Free agent
- (S) Suspended
- Injured

Roster
Updated: 2008-10-11

== Regular season ==
=== Standings ===
Central Division	W	L	PCT	GB	Home	Road	Div	GP
z-Cleveland Cavaliers	66	16	.805	—	39–2	27–14	13–3	82
x-Chicago Bulls	41	41	.500	25	28–13	13–28	9–7	82
x-Detroit Pistons	39	43	.476	27	21–20	18–23	7–9	82
Indiana Pacers	36	46	.439	30	25–16	11–30	7–9	82
Milwaukee Bucks	34	48	.415	32	22–19	12–29	4–12	82

#	Eastern Conference				
#	Team	W	L	PCT	GB
1	z-Cleveland Cavaliers	66	16	.805	—
2	y-Boston Celtics	62	20	.756	4
3	y-Orlando Magic	59	23	.720	7
4	x-Atlanta Hawks	47	35	.573	19
5	x-Miami Heat	43	39	.524	23
6	x-Philadelphia 76ers	41	41	.500	25
7	x-Chicago Bulls	41	41	.500	25
8	x-Detroit Pistons	39	43	.476	27
9	Indiana Pacers	36	46	.439	30
10	Charlotte Bobcats	35	47	.427	31
11	New Jersey Nets	34	48	.415	32
12	Milwaukee Bucks	34	48	.415	32
13	Toronto Raptors	33	49	.402	33
14	New York Knicks	32	50	.390	34
15	Washington Wizards	19	63	.232	47

=== Game log ===
2008–09 game log
October: 0–1 (home: 0–0; road: 0–1)

Game	Date	Team	Score	High points	High rebounds	High assists	Location Attendance	Record
1	October 29	@ Detroit	L 94–100	Danny Granger (33)	Troy Murphy (15)	T. J. Ford (5)	The Palace of Auburn Hills; 22,076	0–1

November: 6–9 (home: 4–4; road: 2–5)

Game	Date	Team	Score	High points	High rebounds	High assists	Location Attendance	Record
2	November 1	Boston	W 95–79	Danny Granger (20)	Marquis Daniels (10)	Troy Murphy (5)	Conseco Fieldhouse; 18,165	1–1
3	November 5	Phoenix	L 103–113	T. J. Ford, Danny Granger (23)	Troy Murphy (10)	Troy Murphy (4)	Conseco Fieldhouse; 11,660	1–2
4	November 7	@ Cleveland	L 107–111	Danny Granger (33)	Marquis Daniels (11)	Marquis Daniels (7)	Quicken Loans Arena; 20,562	1–3
5	November 8	New Jersey	W 98–80	Danny Granger (23)	Jeff Foster (13)	T. J. Ford (9)	Conseco Fieldhouse; 14,355	2–3
6	November 10	Oklahoma City	W 107–99	T. J. Ford (24)	T. J. Ford, Danny Granger (7)	T. J. Ford (10)	Conseco Fieldhouse; 10,165	3–3
7	November 12	@ New Jersey	W 98–87	T. J. Ford (18)	T. J. Ford (8)	T. J. Ford (9)	Izod Center; 13,551	4–3
8	November 14	Philadelphia	L 92–94	Danny Granger (18)	Jeff Foster (11)	T. J. Ford (7)	Conseco Fieldhouse; 12,742	4–4
9	November 15	@ Chicago	L 91–104	T. J. Ford (16)	Troy Murphy (13)	Troy Murphy (5)	United Center; 21,759	4–5
10	November 18	Atlanta	W 113–96	Danny Granger (34)	Troy Murphy (19)	Radoslav Nesterović, Jarrett Jack (5)	Conseco Fieldhouse; 13,379	5–5
11	November 21	Orlando	L 98–100 (OT)	Marquis Daniels (25)	Troy Murphy (10)	Radoslav Nesterović (8)	Conseco Fieldhouse; 14,699	5–6
12	November 22	@ Miami	L 100–109	Marquis Daniels (25)	Troy Murphy (11)	Danny Granger, Troy Murphy (6)	American Airlines Arena; 18,685	5–7
13	November 25	@ Dallas	L 106–109	Danny Granger (22)	Troy Murphy (14)	T. J. Ford (7)	American Airlines Center; 19,996	5–8
14	November 26	@ Houston	W 91–90	Troy Murphy (21)	Troy Murphy (14)	Danny Granger (5)	Toyota Center; 18,194	6–8
15	November 28	Charlotte	L 108–115 (OT)	Danny Granger (35)	Troy Murphy (12)	T. J. Ford (6)	Conseco Fieldhouse; 17,160	6–9
16	November 29	@ Orlando	L 96–110	Danny Granger (27)	Troy Murphy (11)	T. J. Ford, Jarrett Jack (5)	Amway Arena; 17,172	6–10

December: 4–11 (home: 2–5; road: 2–6)

Game	Date	Team	Score	High points	High rebounds	High assists	Location Attendance	Record
17	December 2	L.A. Lakers	W 118–117	Danny Granger (32)	Troy Murphy (17)	T. J. Ford (8)	Conseco Fieldhouse; 16,412	7–10
18	December 3	@ Boston	L 96–114	Danny Granger (20)	Troy Murphy (10)	T. J. Ford (8)	TD Banknorth Garden; 18,624	7–11
19	December 5	@ Cleveland	L 73–97	Troy Murphy (15)	Jeff Foster (7)	Danny Granger (5)	Quicken Loans Arena; 20,562	7–12
20	December 7	Boston	L 117–122 (OT)	Marquis Daniels (26)	Marquis Daniels, Jeff Foster (7)	Danny Granger (6)	Conseco Fieldhouse; 16,102	7–13
21	December 10	@ Toronto	L 88–101	Danny Granger (22)	Troy Murphy (20)	Troy Murphy (6)	Air Canada Centre; 17,877	7–14
22	December 12	@ Detroit	L 110–114	Danny Granger (42)	Troy Murphy (11)	T. J. Ford (10)	The Palace of Auburn Hills; 22,076	7–15
23	December 13	@ Milwaukee	L 103–121	T. J. Ford (27)	Troy Murphy (11)	T. J. Ford (6)	Bradley Center; 14,921	7–16
24	December 15	@ Washington	W 118–98	Danny Granger (27)	Troy Murphy (12)	Marquis Daniels (7)	Verizon Center; 14,502	8–16
25	December 17	Golden State	W 127–120	Danny Granger (41)	Danny Granger, Brandon Rush, Jeff Foster (11)	Danny Granger (6)	Conseco Fieldhouse; 11,151	9–16
26	December 19	L.A. Clippers	L 109–117 (2OT)	Jarrett Jack (27)	Jeff Foster (11)	Jarrett Jack (7)	Conseco Fieldhouse; 12,653	9–17
27	December 20	@ Philadelphia	W 95–94	T. J. Ford (25)	Jeff Foster (10)	Jarrett Jack (8)	Wachovia Center; 14,599	10–17
28	December 23	New Jersey	L 107–108	Danny Granger (26)	Jeff Foster (14)	Jarrett Jack (8)	Conseco Fieldhouse; 11,272	10–18
29	December 26	@ Memphis	L 105–108	Marquis Daniels (28)	Troy Murphy (12)	Jarrett Jack, Danny Granger (5)	FedExForum; 12,346	10–19
30	December 28	New Orleans	L 103–105	Danny Granger (34)	Troy Murphy (16)	Jarrett Jack, Marquis Daniels (6)	Conseco Fieldhouse; 14,374	10–20
31	December 30	Atlanta	L 104–110	Danny Granger (25)	Troy Murphy (14)	Danny Granger (5)	Conseco Fieldhouse; 13,762	10–21

January: 9–8 (home: 7–1; road: 2–7)

Game	Date	Team	Score	High points	High rebounds	High assists	Location Attendance	Record
32	January 2	@ New York	W 105–103	Jarrett Jack (29)	Troy Murphy (18)	Danny Granger (6)	Madison Square Garden; 19,763	11–21
33	January 3	Sacramento	W 122–117	Danny Granger (35)	Troy Murphy (13)	T. J. Ford (7)	Conseco Fieldhouse; 12,765	12–21
34	January 5	@ Denver	L 115–135	Danny Granger (36)	Troy Murphy (12)	Jarrett Jack (7)	Pepsi Center; 14,255	12–22
35	January 7	@ Phoenix	W 113–110	Danny Granger (37)	Jeff Foster (9)	Danny Granger (6)	US Airways Center; 18,422	13–22
36	January 9	@ L.A. Lakers	L 119–121	Danny Granger (28)	Troy Murphy (6)	Jarrett Jack (8)	Staples Center; 18,997	13–23
37	January 11	@ Golden State	L 117–120	Danny Granger (42)	Jeff Foster (12)	Jarrett Jack, T. J. Ford (6)	Oracle Arena; 18,262	13–24
38	January 12	@ Utah	L 113–120	Danny Granger (30)	Troy Murphy (10)	Travis Diener (8)	EnergySolutions Arena; 19,911	13–25
39	January 14	Detroit	W 110–106 (OT)	Danny Granger (24)	Troy Murphy (13)	Jarrett Jack (6)	Conseco Fieldhouse; 11,964	14–25
40	January 16	Toronto	W 111–104	Danny Granger (23)	Troy Murphy (15)	Jarrett Jack (7)	Conseco Fieldhouse; 13,234	15–25
41	January 19	@ New Orleans	L 100–103	Danny Granger (30)	Troy Murphy (11)	Troy Murphy (5)	New Orleans Arena; 17,237	15–26
42	January 20	@ San Antonio	L 81–99	Danny Granger (17)	Troy Murphy (10)	Radoslav Nesterović (4)	AT&T Center; 18,181	15–27
43	January 23	Houston	W 107–102	Danny Granger (25)	Troy Murphy (16)	T. J. Ford (6)	Conseco Fieldhouse; 14,486	16–27
44	January 25	Charlotte	W 98–93	Danny Granger (27)	Troy Murphy (14)	T. J. Ford (7)	Conseco Fieldhouse; 10,936	17–27
45	January 27	@ Orlando	L 111–135	T. J. Ford (23)	Troy Murphy (7)	Travis Diener, Jarrett Jack, Mike Dunleavy Jr. (4)	Amway Arena; 17,461	17–28
46	January 28	Milwaukee	W 107–99	T. J. Ford (34)	Troy Murphy (13)	Jarrett Jack (6)	Conseco Fieldhouse; 12,143	18–28
47	January 30	Miami	W 114–103	Mike Dunleavy Jr. (30)	Troy Murphy (12)	Mike Dunleavy Jr. (5)	Conseco Fieldhouse; 14,031	19–28
48	January 31	New York	L 113–122	T. J. Ford (36)	Troy Murphy (11)	T. J. Ford (5)	Conseco Fieldhouse; 15,067	19–29

February: 6–7 (home: 5–1; road: 1–6)

Game	Date	Team	Score	High points	High rebounds	High assists	Location Attendance	Record
49	February 3	Minnesota	L 111–116	Danny Granger (28)	Troy Murphy (12)	T. J. Ford (7)	Conseco Fieldhouse; 11,015	19–30
50	February 5	@ Philadelphia	L 94–99	Mike Dunleavy Jr. (21)	Troy Murphy (14)	T. J. Ford (7)	Wachovia Center; 10,699	19–31
51	February 6	Orlando	W 107–102	Danny Granger (33)	Jarrett Jack, Troy Murphy (8)	T. J. Ford (5)	Conseco Fieldhouse; 13,559	20–31
52	February 8	@ Washington	L 117–119	Danny Granger (29)	Troy Murphy (10)	T. J. Ford (7)	Verizon Center; 13,708	20–32
53	February 10	Cleveland	W 96–95	Troy Murphy (18)	Troy Murphy (15)	T. J. Ford (4)	Conseco Fieldhouse; 18,165	21–32
54	February 11	@ Milwaukee	L 110–122	Danny Granger (26)	Troy Murphy (10)	T. J. Ford (13)	Bradley Center; 13,486	21–33
55	February 17	Philadelphia	W 100–91	Danny Granger (20)	Danny Granger (10)	T. J. Ford (7)	Conseco Fieldhouse; 13,259	22–33
56	February 18	@ Charlotte	L 94–103	Jarrett Jack, Troy Murphy (18)	Troy Murphy (16)	Travis Diener (6)	Time Warner Cable Arena; 12,374	22–34
57	February 20	@ Minnesota	W 112–105	Marquis Daniels (24)	Troy Murphy (14)	Travis Diener (6)	Target Center; 13,777	23–34
58	February 22	Chicago	W 98–91	Troy Murphy (27)	Troy Murphy (14)	T. J. Ford, Jarrett Jack (5)	Conseco Fieldhouse; 17,083	24–34
59	February 23	@ New York	L 119–123	Jarrett Jack (33)	Troy Murphy (21)	Troy Murphy (4)	Madison Square Garden; 17,283	24–35
60	February 25	Memphis	W 104–99	T. J. Ford, Jarrett Jack (20)	Troy Murphy (12)	Jarrett Jack (6)	Conseco Fieldhouse; 13,211	25–35
61	February 27	@ Boston	L 99–104	T. J. Ford (23)	Troy Murphy (13)	T. J. Ford, Marquis Daniels (4)	TD Banknorth Garden; 18,624	25–36

March: 7–7 (home: 4–3; road: 3–4)

Game	Date	Team	Score	High points	High rebounds	High assists	Location Attendance	Record
62	March 1	Denver	W 100–94	Jarrett Jack (28)	Troy Murphy (18)	Jarrett Jack (8)	Conseco Fieldhouse; 12,458	26–36
63	March 3	@ Sacramento	W 117–109	Jarrett Jack (26)	Troy Murphy (10)	T. J. Ford (9)	ARCO Arena; 10,748	27–36
64	March 4	@ Portland	L 105–107	Marquis Daniels (28)	Troy Murphy (13)	T. J. Ford (5)	Rose Garden; 20,020	27–37
65	March 7	@ L.A. Clippers	W 106–105	Jarrett Jack (25)	Troy Murphy (15)	T. J. Ford (8)	Staples Center; 16,518	28–37
66	March 10	Utah	L 100–112	Troy Murphy (23)	Troy Murphy (13)	T. J. Ford (9)	Conseco Fieldhouse; 13,705	28–38
67	March 13	@ Atlanta	L 87–101	T. J. Ford (29)	Troy Murphy (14)	T. J. Ford (5)	Philips Arena; 14,079	28–39
68	March 15	@ Toronto	L 87–110	Troy Murphy (16)	Troy Murphy (10)	T. J. Ford (6)	Air Canada Centre; 18,169	28–40
69	March 18	Portland	L 85–95	Danny Granger (35)	Jeff Foster (11)	T. J. Ford (6)	Conseco Fieldhouse; 13,072	28–41
70	March 20	Dallas	L 92–94	Danny Granger (18)	Danny Granger, Troy Murphy (11)	Danny Granger, Travis Diener (4)	Conseco Fieldhouse; 17,232	28–42
71	March 21	@ Charlotte	W 108–83	Jarrett Jack (31)	Jarrett Jack (6)	T. J. Ford (6)	Time Warner Cable Arena; 15,721	29–42
72	March 25	Miami	W 90–88	Danny Granger (28)	Jeff Foster (16)	Jarrett Jack (4)	Conseco Fieldhouse; 17,117	30–42
73	March 28	@ Chicago	L 106–112	Danny Granger (32)	Jeff Foster (18)	Jarrett Jack (9)	United Center; 20,756	30–43
74	March 29	Washington	W 124–115	Danny Granger (31)	Brandon Rush (10)	T. J. Ford (10)	Conseco Fieldhouse; 13,729	31–43
75	March 31	Chicago	W 107–105	Danny Granger (31)	Troy Murphy (12)	T. J. Ford (9)	Conseco Fieldhouse; 15,687	32–43

April: 4–3 (home: 3–2; road: 1–1)

Game	Date	Team	Score	High points	High rebounds	High assists	Location Attendance	Record
76	April 3	San Antonio	L 121–126	Danny Granger (35)	Troy Murphy (13)	Jarrett Jack, T. J. Ford (6)	Conseco Fieldhouse; 16,414	32–44
77	April 5	@ Oklahoma City	W 117–99	Danny Granger (24)	Troy Murphy (9)	T. J. Ford (5)	Ford Center; 19,136	33–44
78	April 8	Toronto	W 130–101	Danny Granger (29)	Troy Murphy (14)	T. J. Ford (11)	Conseco Fieldhouse; 13,647	34–44
79	April 10	@ Atlanta	L 118–122	Danny Granger (35)	Troy Murphy (10)	Jarrett Jack (7)	Philips Arena; 17,222	34–45
80	April 11	Detroit	W 106–102	Danny Granger (24)	Troy Murphy (13)	Jarrett Jack (6)	Conseco Fieldhouse; 17,116	35–45
81	April 13	Cleveland	L 109–117	Danny Granger (38)	Troy Murphy (13)	Jarrett Jack (5)	Conseco Fieldhouse; 18,165	35–46
82	April 15	Milwaukee	W 115–108	Danny Granger (35)	Troy Murphy (12)	Jarrett Jack (10)	Conseco Fieldhouse; 18,165	36–46

2015–16 season schedule

== Player statistics ==
=== Regular season ===
Player	POS	GP	GS	MP	REB	AST	STL	BLK	PTS	MPG	RPG	APG	SPG	BPG	PPG
Jarrett Jack	SG	82	53	2,716	276	338	88	17	1,074	33.1	3.4	4.1	1.1	.2	13.1
Brandon Rush	SG	75	19	1,803	233	66	38	37	610	24.0	3.1	.9	.5	.5	8.1
T. J. Ford	PG	74	49	2,258	259	392	89	16	1,106	30.5	3.5	5.3	1.2	.2	14.9
Jeff Foster	C	74	26	1,828	508	130	53	49	452	24.7	6.9	1.8	.7	.7	6.1
Troy Murphy	PF	73	73	2,482	861	172	58	34	1,041	34.0	11.8	2.4	.8	.5	14.3
Roy Hibbert	C	70	42	1,009	243	49	20	76	494	14.4	3.5	.7	.3	1.1	7.1
Rasho Nesterović	C	70	19	1,214	240	109	30	38	473	17.3	3.4	1.6	.4	.5	6.8
Danny Granger	SF	67	66	2,424	341	183	69	97	1,728	36.2	5.1	2.7	1.0	1.4	25.8
Travis Diener	PG	55	0	719	86	122	26	5	206	13.1	1.6	2.2	.5	.1	3.7
Marquis Daniels	SF	54	43	1,700	248	114	62	26	733	31.5	4.6	2.1	1.1	.5	13.6
Stephen Graham	SG	52	6	684	96	33	10	4	282	13.2	1.8	.6	.2	.1	5.4
Josh McRoberts	PF	33	0	279	74	16	12	16	80	8.5	2.2	.5	.4	.5	2.4
Maceo Baston	PF	27	0	217	52	7	6	10	67	8.0	1.9	.3	.2	.4	2.5
Mike Dunleavy Jr.	SG	18	14	495	68	44	12	9	271	27.5	3.8	2.4	.7	.5	15.1

== Season Transactions ==
=== Trades ===
July 9, 2008	To Indiana Pacers T. J. Ford, Rasho Nesterovič, Maceo Baston and the rights to Roy Hibbert	To Toronto Raptors Jermaine O'Neal and the rights to Nathan Jawai

=== Free agents ===
==== Additions ====
Player	Signed	Former team

==== Subtractions ====
Player	Left	New team
