= Troy Murphy =

American basketball player (born 1980)

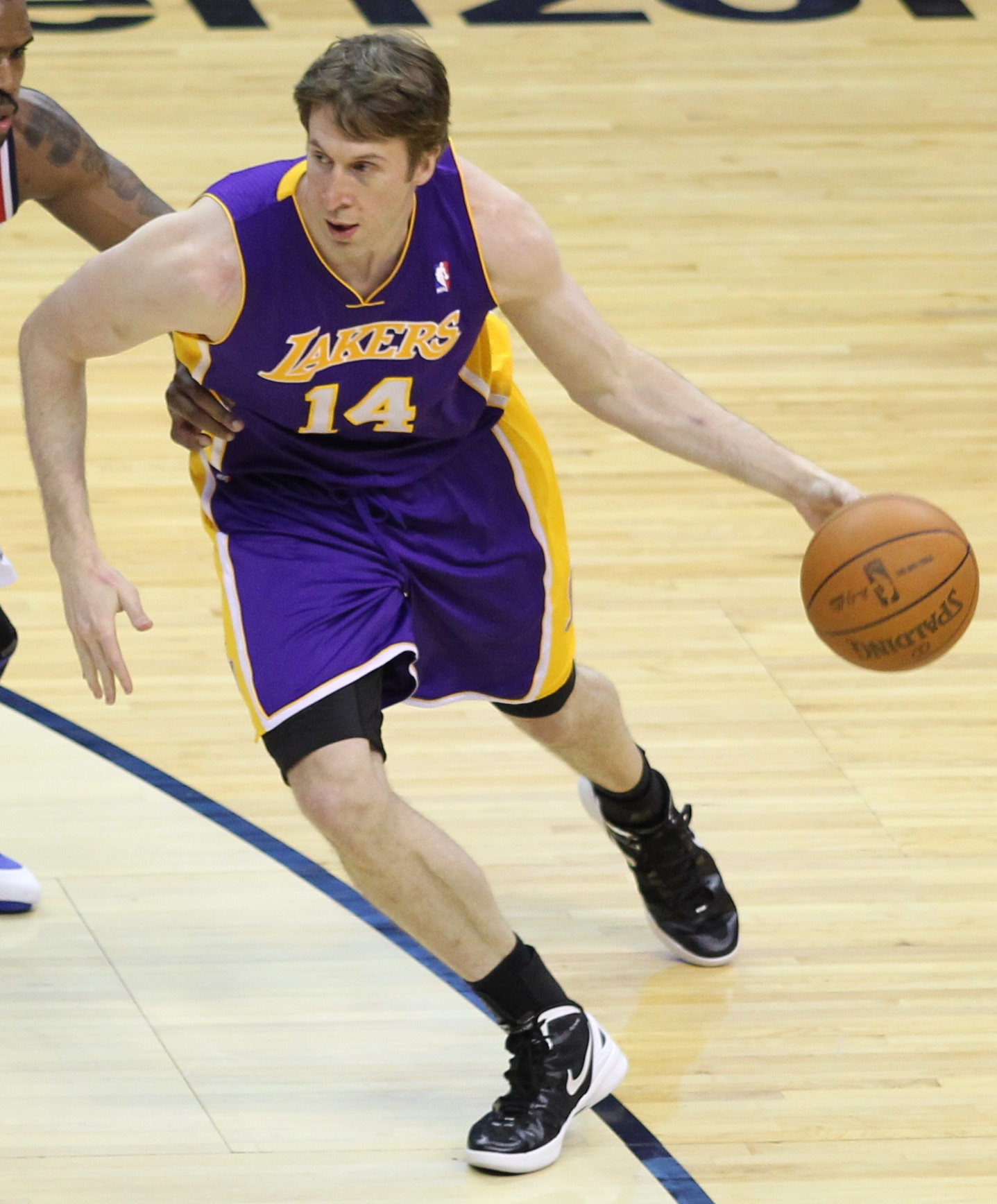
- Murphy with the Los Angeles Lakers in 2012

Personal information
- Born: May 2, 1980 (age 46) Morristown, New Jersey, U.S.
- Listed height: 6 ft 11 in (2.11 m)
- Listed weight: 245 lb (111 kg)

Career information
- High school: Delbarton School (Morristown, New Jersey)
- College: Notre Dame (1998–2001)
- NBA draft: 2001: 1st round, 14th overall pick
- Drafted by: Golden State Warriors
- Playing career: 2001–2012
- Position: Power forward / center
- Number: 1, 3, 7, 30, 14, 6

Career history
- 2001–2007: Golden State Warriors
- 2007–2010: Indiana Pacers
- 2010–2011: New Jersey Nets
- 2011: Boston Celtics
- 2011–2012: Los Angeles Lakers
- 2012: Dallas Mavericks

Career highlights
- 2× Consensus first-team All-American (2000, 2001); 2× Big East Player of the Year (2000, 2001); 2× First-team All-Big East (2000, 2001)

Career NBA statistics
- Points: 7,860 (10.8 ppg)
- Rebounds: 5,708 (7.8 rpg)
- Assists: 1,088 (1.5 apg)
- Stats at NBA.com
- Stats at Basketball Reference

Troy Brandon Murphy (born May 2, 1980) is an American former professional basketball player who played twelve seasons in the National Basketball Association (NBA). Murphy was born in Morristown, New Jersey but grew up in Sparta Township. He attended the Delbarton School and the University of Notre Dame, both of which are Roman Catholic schools. During his time at Notre Dame, he was a two-time consensus All-American before declaring himself for the 2001 NBA draft, where he was selected by the Golden State Warriors with the 14th overall pick. Murphy has since graduated from Columbia University.

== High school ==
Murphy was a standout performer for Delbarton School in Morristown, New Jersey and coach Dan Whalen.

His breakout year was as a sophomore when he averaged 20.5 points per game and 11.8 rebounds, earning first team all-county honors. He followed up his sophomore year with a successful junior campaign, averaging 23.5 points and 10.5 rebounds and All-State honors. His senior year would be his most successful season as he led Delbarton to a 20–6 record and the state quarterfinals.

For the season he averaged 33.0 points per game (on 56.8 percent shooting), to lead the state in scoring along with 14.8 rebounds and 3.2 blocks per game. At the end of the season he was named Morris County Player of the Year by the Newark Star-Ledger and the most valuable player for his team at the prestigious Capital Classic in Washington, D.C.

== College career ==
Murphy played college basketball at the University of Notre Dame. He led the Irish in scoring and rebounding in each of his three seasons, averaging 21.8 points and 9.2 rebounds during the 2000–01 campaign. A consensus first-team All-American as a junior and sophomore, he is one of 10 Irish players to earn consensus All-American honors (which includes six players named on more than one occasion).

Murphy shared Big East Conference Player of the Year honors with Troy Bell of Boston College in 2001 and joined an elite group of four players—Chris Mullin (St. John's), Patrick Ewing (Georgetown) and Richard Hamilton (Connecticut)—as the only two-time winners of the award. He was named to the John R. Wooden Award All-America Team for the second consecutive year, finished fifth in the balloting for the Wooden Award and was among the top three finalists for the Naismith player-of-the-year honor. A first-team all-Big East selection for two seasons, Murphy also was named the Big East Rookie of the Year in 1999.

He became just the fifth player in Notre Dame history to score more than 2,000 career points and finished his career fifth on the all-time scoring list with 2,011 points. Murphy is the only player to score more than 2,000 points and grab more than 900 rebounds (924) in 94 career games. He left Notre Dame with career averages of 21.4 points and 9.8 rebounds. Murphy was a starter in 93 games during his career and scored in double figures in 92 of those 94 contests.

In addition to finishing fifth on the all-time career scoring list, upon his departure from the university, he ranked second in blocked shots (126), free throws made (587) and free throws attempted (755), sixth in rebounding and field goals made (680) and ninth in field goals attempted (1,370).

On January 23, 2016, Murphy was inducted into Notre Dame's Ring of Honor.

== Professional career ==
=== Golden State Warriors (2001–2007) ===
Murphy was selected 14th overall in the 2001 NBA draft by the Golden State Warriors. After starting slowly, he showed promise toward the end of the season. He realized this promise in his second pro season, averaging a double-double – 11.7 pts and 10.2 boards – and finishing second in Most Improved Player voting. He also started the Rookie Challenge as the Sophomores' power forward. However, his three-point shooting that was a huge part of his college success was nearly absent, as he only attempted 14 three-pointers during the year, making five. He spent the next offseason working extensively on his outside shooting; however, he never got much of a chance to test out his new jumper in 2003–04 after a series of injuries limited him to 28 games, with no starts.

However, he did attempt 17 threes in those games. With that part of his arsenal seemingly ready to go, Murphy spent the following offseason working on strength and conditioning as he looked to be a more well-rounded and complete player. While he had one injury scare the next season, he played in 70 games, and rediscovered his three-point shot, attempting nearly three per game. He averaged 15.4 points and 10.8 rebounds and finished 22nd in Western Conference All-Star voting that year. His numbers dropped off slightly in 2005–06 to 14.0 and 10.0 per game.

=== Indiana Pacers (2007–2010) ===
On January 17, 2007, Murphy was involved in an 8-player trade that sent him, Mike Dunleavy Jr., Ike Diogu, and Keith McLeod to the Indiana Pacers for Stephen Jackson, Al Harrington, Šarūnas Jasikevičius, and Josh Powell. During his time with the Pacers, Murphy's three-point shot improved even more. Against the Utah Jazz on March 10, 2009, Murphy made seven out of his first eight three-pointers in the first half.

=== New Jersey Nets (2010–2011) ===
On August 11, 2010, the Pacers traded Murphy to the New Jersey Nets in a four-team, five-player deal.

=== Boston Celtics (2011) ===
On February 23, 2011, the Warriors reacquired Murphy and a second-round pick in exchange for Brandan Wright and Dan Gadzuric. On February 27, Murphy and the Warriors reached a buyout agreement. He was waived in time to be playoff-eligible for a new team.

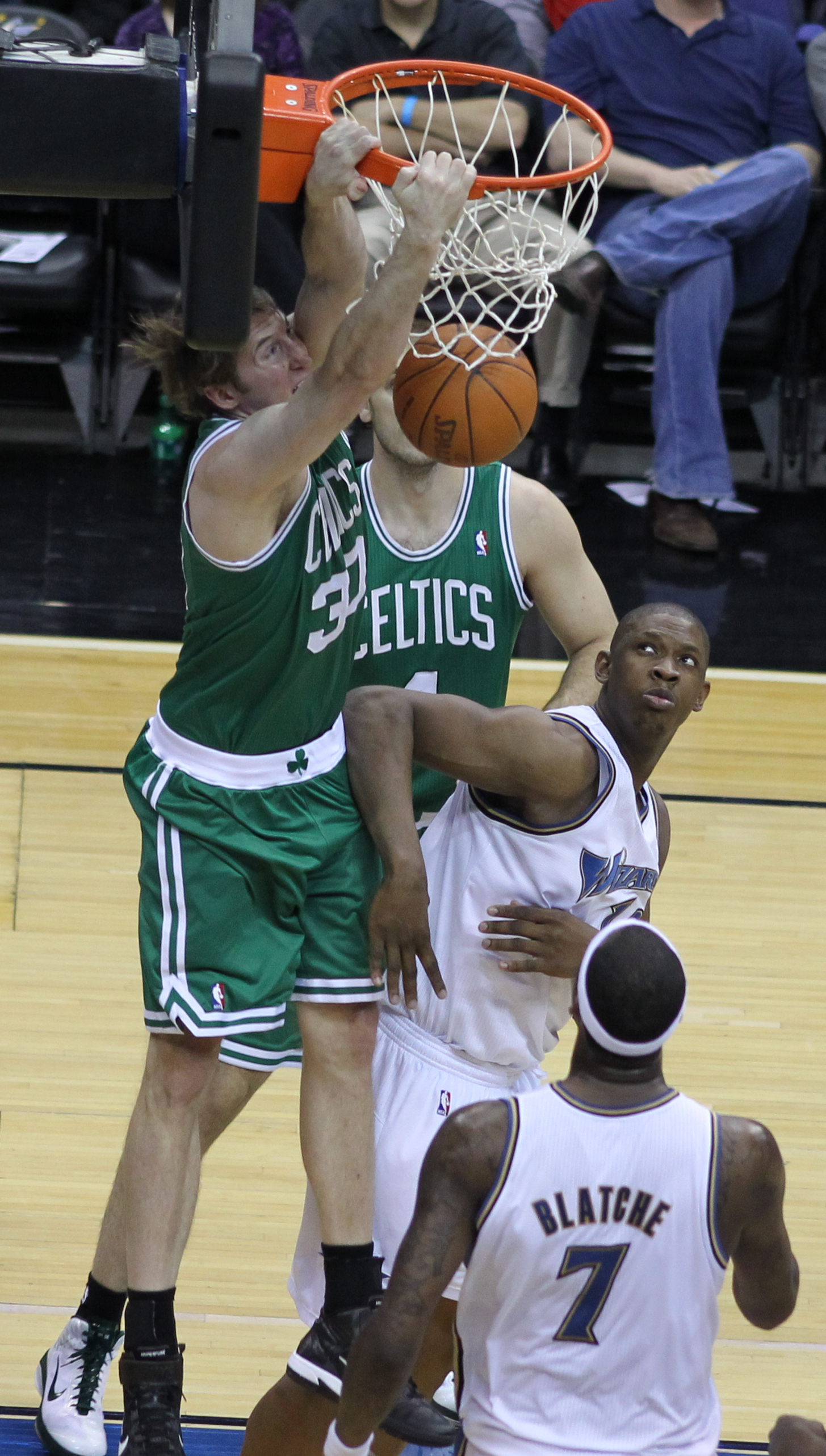
Murphy with the Celtics

On March 2, 2011, Murphy signed with the Boston Celtics for the remainder of the 2010-11 NBA season. On April 22, 2011, Murphy played in his first career playoff game, a first-round game against the New York Knicks.

=== Los Angeles Lakers (2011–2012) ===
On December 17, 2011, Murphy signed with the Los Angeles Lakers for the 2011-12 NBA season. Over the season, he averaged 3.2 points in 16.2 minutes per game.

=== Dallas Mavericks (2012) ===
On November 2, 2012, Murphy signed with the Dallas Mavericks for the 2012–13 NBA season, replacing Eddy Curry. Murphy's final game in the NBA was played on November 28, 2012, in a 78 - 101 loss to the Chicago Bulls where he recorded 7 points, 2 rebounds and 2 blocks. He was waived the very next day on November 29 when Dallas signed guard Derek Fisher.

== NBA career statistics ==
Legend
GP	Games played	GS	Games started	MPG	Minutes per game
FG%	Field goal percentage	3P%	3-point field goal percentage	FT%	Free throw percentage
RPG	Rebounds per game	APG	Assists per game	SPG	Steals per game
BPG	Blocks per game	PPG	Points per game	**Bold**	Career high

=== Regular season ===
Year	Team	GP	GS	MPG	FG%	3P%	FT%	RPG	APG	SPG	BPG	PPG
2001–02	Golden State	**82**	4	17.7	.421	.333	.776	3.9	.9	.4	.3	5.9
2002–03	Golden State	79	**79**	31.8	.451	.214	.841	10.2	1.3	.8	.4	11.7
2003–04	Golden State	28	0	21.8	.440	.294	.750	6.2	.7	.4	.6	10.0
2004–05	Golden State	70	69	33.9	.414	.399	.730	10.8	1.4	.8	.5	**15.4**
2005–06	Golden State	74	74	**34.0**	.433	.320	.787	10.0	1.4	.6	.4	14.0
2006–07	Golden State	26	17	25.7	.450	.373	.712	6.0	2.3	.8	**.7**	8.9
2006–07	Indiana	42	31	28.2	.461	.409	.772	6.1	1.6	.6	.6	11.1
2007–08	Indiana	75	61	28.1	.455	.398	.797	7.2	2.2	.7	.4	12.2
2008–09	Indiana	73	73	**34.0**	**.475**	**.450**	.826	**11.8**	**2.4**	.8	.5	14.3
2009–10	Indiana	72	69	32.6	.472	.384	.798	10.2	2.1	**1.0**	.5	14.6
2010–11	New Jersey	18	4	16.0	.342	.174	.529	4.2	.9	.4	.1	3.6
2010–11	Boston	17	0	10.5	.421	.100	.846	2.2	.4	.5	.1	2.6
2011–12	L.A. Lakers	59	0	16.2	.450	.418	.667	3.2	.9	.3	.3	3.2
2012–13	Dallas	14	1	18.3	.361	.314	**.909**	3.5	.5	.7	.4	4.6
Career		729	482	27.3	.445	.388	.785	7.8	1.5	.7	.4	10.8

=== Playoffs ===
Year	Team	GP	GS	MPG	FG%	3P%	FT%	RPG	APG	SPG	BPG	PPG
2011	Boston	1	0	3.0	—	—	—	**1.0**	.0	.0	.0	.0
2012	L.A. Lakers	**4**	0	**3.8**	**1.000**	**1.000**	—	.8	.0	.0	.0	**.8**
Career		5	0	3.4	1.000	1.000	—	.8	.0	.0	.0	.6

== Personal life ==
Murphy earned $66,000,000 in his NBA career. He then attended the Columbia University School of General Studies, pursuing a degree in sociology. Murphy maintained a 3.8 GPA and made the dean's list, according to The New York Times. He has since graduated.
