= Jarrett Jack =

American basketball player and coach (born 1983)

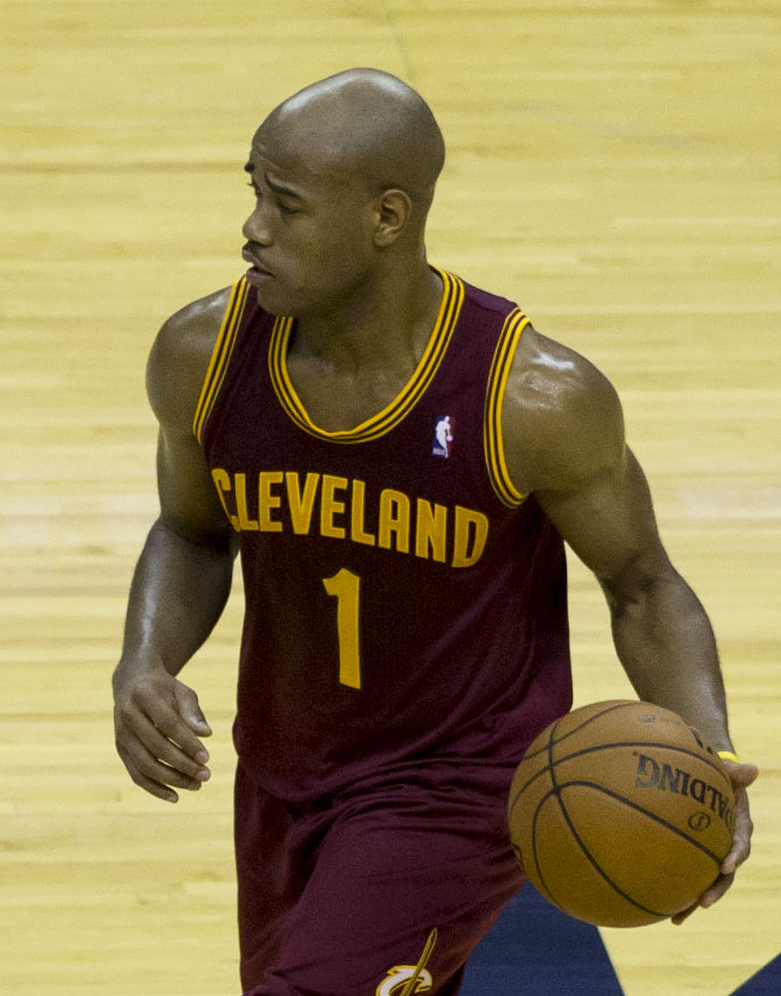
- Jack with the Cleveland Cavaliers in 2013

Detroit Pistons
- Title: Assistant coach
- League: NBA

Personal information
- Born: October 28, 1983 (age 43) Fort Washington, Maryland, U.S.
- Listed height: 6 ft 3 in (1.91 m)
- Listed weight: 200 lb (91 kg)

Career information
- High school: DeMatha Catholic (Hyattsville, Maryland); Mt. Zion Christian Academy (Durham, North Carolina); St. Vincent Pallotti (Laurel, Maryland); Worcester Academy (Worcester, Massachusetts)
- College: Georgia Tech (2002–2005)
- NBA draft: 2005: 1st round, 22nd overall pick
- Drafted by: Denver Nuggets
- Playing career: 2005–2021
- Position: Point guard
- Number: 0, 1, 2, 55
- Coaching career: 2021–present

Career history

Playing
- 2005–2008: Portland Trail Blazers
- 2008–2009: Indiana Pacers
- 2009–2010: Toronto Raptors
- 2010–2012: New Orleans Hornets
- 2012–2013: Golden State Warriors
- 2013–2014: Cleveland Cavaliers
- 2014–2016: Brooklyn Nets
- 2017: New Orleans Pelicans
- 2017–2018: New York Knicks
- 2019–2020: Sioux Falls Skyforce
- 2021: NBA G League Ignite

Coaching
- 2021–2023: Phoenix Suns (assistant)
- 2023–present: Detroit Pistons (assistant)

Career highlights
- Second-team All-ACC (2005); Third-team All-ACC (2004)

Career statistics
- Points: 9,349 (10.8 ppg)
- Rebounds: 2,487 (2.9 rpg)
- Assists: 3,952 (4.6 apg)
- Stats at NBA.com
- Stats at Basketball Reference

Jarrett Matthew Jack (born October 28, 1983) is an American professional basketball coach and former player and an assistant coach for the Detroit Pistons of the National Basketball Association (NBA). He attended four high schools in North Carolina, Maryland and Massachusetts before playing collegiately at Georgia Tech. He was selected with the 22nd overall pick in the 2005 NBA draft by the Denver Nuggets, before playing with the Portland Trail Blazers, Indiana Pacers, Toronto Raptors, New Orleans Hornets, Golden State Warriors, Cleveland Cavaliers, Brooklyn Nets, New Orleans Pelicans, and New York Knicks.

== High school career ==
Jack attended four high schools, including DeMatha Catholic High School and St. Vincent Pallotti High School in Maryland, Mount Zion Academy in North Carolina, and Worcester Academy in Massachusetts.

Considered a four-star recruit by Scout.com, Jack was listed as the No. 9 point guard and the No. 40 player in the nation in 2002.

== College career ==
After high school, Jack played for Georgia Tech in Atlanta. In his sophomore year (2003–04), he helped guide Georgia Tech to the NCAA Finals with 12.5 points and 5.1 assists a game. In his junior and final year at Georgia Tech he averaged 15.5 points, 4.8 rebounds and 4.5 assists.

After forgoing his senior year of eligibility at Georgia Tech to enter the NBA draft, Jack graduated on December 13, 2014, receiving his degree in business management at commencement ceremonies in Atlanta.

== Professional career ==
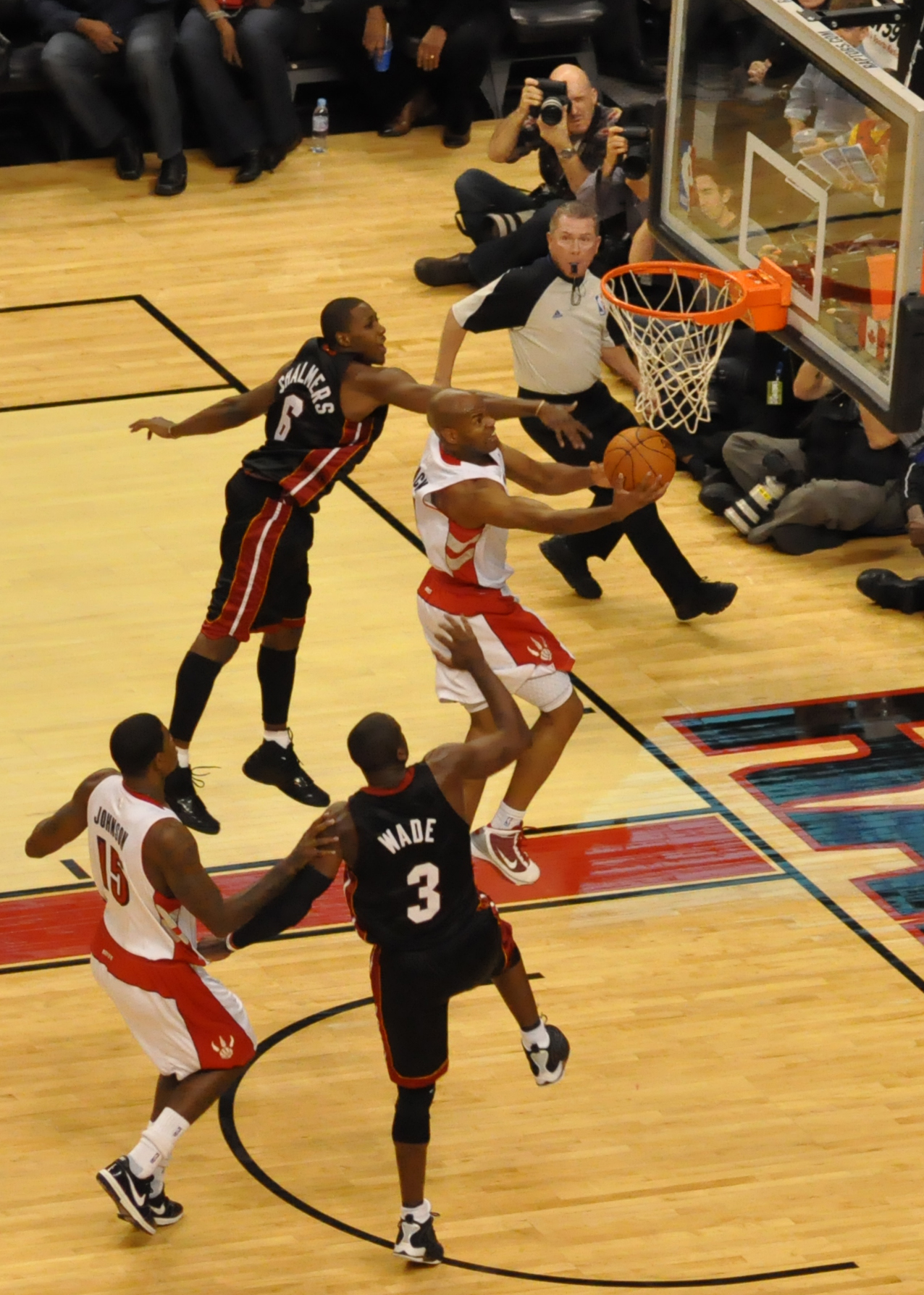
Jack going for a layup in a game between the Toronto Raptors and the Miami Heat

=== Portland Trail Blazers (2005–2008) ===
After his junior year at Georgia Tech, he opted to enter the 2005 NBA draft and was selected by the Denver Nuggets with the 22nd pick. On draft night, he was traded to the Portland Trail Blazers in exchange for their 27th pick (Linas Kleiza) and 35th pick (Ricky Sánchez).

As a rookie in 2005–06, Jack backed up Steve Blake and Sebastian Telfair as a point guard, getting limited minutes. Blake was traded to the Milwaukee Bucks and Telfair was traded to the Boston Celtics in a multi-player trade during the 2006 off-season. In their absence, Jack was named starting point guard by coach Nate McMillan for the 2006–07 season, dramatically increasing his minutes and stats. With Blake's return in 2007–08, however, Jack was once again relegated to sixth man.

=== Indiana Pacers (2008–2009) ===
On July 9, 2008, Jack was traded to the Indiana Pacers along with Josh McRoberts and 2008 NBA draft pick Brandon Rush for Ike Diogu and Jerryd Bayless.

=== Toronto Raptors (2009–2010) ===
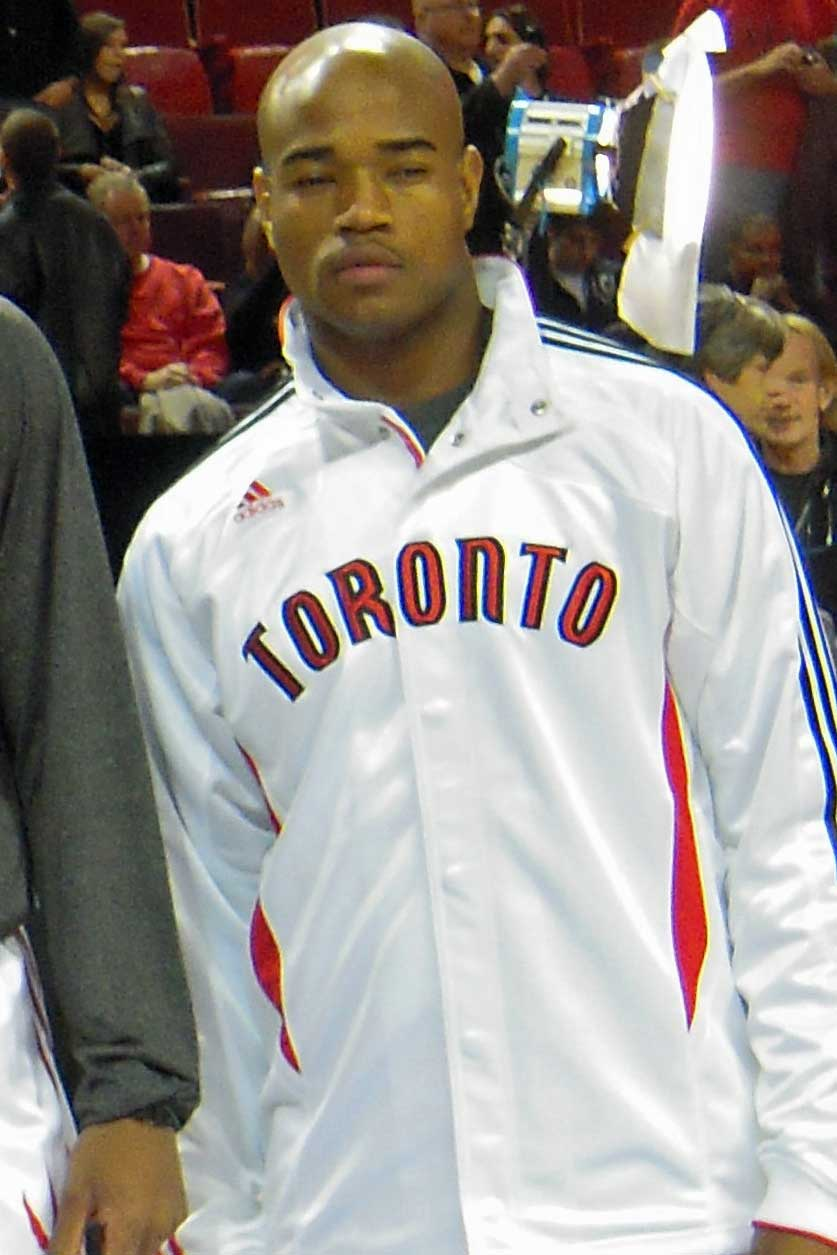
Jack with the Toronto Raptors in 2010

On July 13, 2009, Jack signed a 4-year, $20 million offer sheet with the Toronto Raptors. The Pacers had seven days to match the offer, and they chose not to.

=== New Orleans Hornets (2010–2012) ===
On November 20, 2010, Jack was traded to the New Orleans Hornets, along with Marcus Banks and David Andersen for Peja Stojaković and Jerryd Bayless.

=== Golden State Warriors (2012–2013) ===
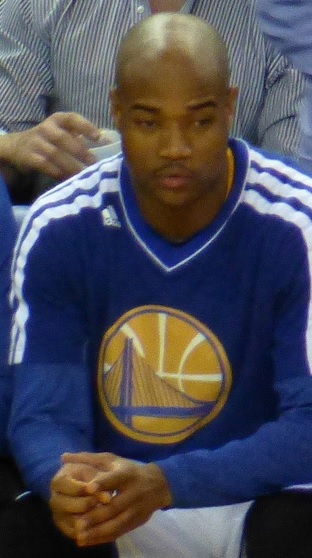
Jack with the Golden State Warriors in 2013

On July 11, 2012, Jack was traded to the Golden State Warriors in a three-team trade including the Philadelphia 76ers, who received Dorell Wright from Golden State. The Hornets received the right to Edin Bavčić in the deal.

On February 22, 2013, Jack recorded a double-double with 30 points and 10 assists against the Spurs and became the first bench player to record such numbers since Magic Johnson in 1996.

At the end of season, Jack finished third in the Sixth Man of the Year voting.

=== Cleveland Cavaliers (2013–2014) ===
On July 12, 2013, Jack signed a four-year, $25 million contract with the Cleveland Cavaliers. On April 15, 2014, he was named the recipient of the ninth annual Austin Carr Good Guy Award. The award, named after Cavaliers legend Austin Carr, is designed to recognize a Cavaliers player who is cooperative and understanding of the media.

=== Brooklyn Nets (2014–2016) ===
On July 10, 2014, the Cleveland Cavaliers traded Jack to the Brooklyn Nets in a three-team trade also involving the Boston Celtics, as they needed to clear cap space to re-sign LeBron James. This is the second trade involving Jack where the team trading him away received the rights to Edin Bavčić in return. Hours after graduating from Georgia Tech on December 13, 2014, Jack travelled to Charlotte to join his teammates for their game against the Hornets. In 20 minutes of action off the bench, he recorded 14 points, 5 assists, and 2 rebounds to help the Nets win 114–87.

On November 14, 2015, Jack scored a season-high 28 points in an overtime loss to the Golden State Warriors. On January 3, 2016, he was ruled out for the rest of the season with a torn anterior cruciate ligament and small medial meniscus tear in his right knee. He sustained the injury the previous night during the second half of the Nets' game at Boston. On June 30, 2016, Jack was waived by the Nets.

On July 15, 2016, Jack signed with the Atlanta Hawks. However, on October 20, 2016, he was waived by the Hawks due to injury. He had been unable to practice during training camp due to torn right knee ligaments he suffered in 2015–16, and subsequently sat out all seven of the Hawks' exhibition games during the preseason.

=== Return to New Orleans (2017) ===
On February 24, 2017, Jack signed a 10-day contract with the New Orleans Pelicans, returning to the franchise for a second stint. However, on March 3, 2017, he was ruled out for four to six weeks after suffering a right lateral meniscus tear.

=== New York Knicks (2017–2018) ===
On September 15, 2017, Jack signed with the New York Knicks. On November 24, 2017, he had 10 points and a season-high 14 assists against the Atlanta Hawks. On December 10, 2017, also against the Hawks, Jack scored a season-high 19 points. On January 10, 2018, he recorded his first triple-double in six years with 16 points, 10 rebounds, and 10 assists in a 122–119 double overtime loss to the Chicago Bulls. Four days later, he set a new season high with 22 points in a 123–118 overtime loss to the New Orleans Pelicans.

Jack signed with the Pelicans on September 19, 2018, before being waived on October 13.

=== Sioux Falls Skyforce (2019–2020) ===
On March 5, 2019, Jack was acquired by the Sioux Falls Skyforce of the NBA G League. In his lone appearance for the Skyforce, Jack tore the ACL and lateral meniscus as well as spraining the MCL in his left knee, which ruled him out for the rest of the season.

On November 26, 2019, Jack was acquired again by the Sioux Falls Skyforce.

=== NBA G League Ignite (2021) ===
On January 14, 2021, Jack signed with the NBA G League Ignite.

== Coaching career ==
=== Phoenix Suns (2021–2023) ===
On August 7, 2021, Jack was hired as an assistant coach for the Phoenix Suns.

=== Detroit Pistons (2023–present) ===
On June 16, 2023, Jack was hired as an assistant coach for the Detroit Pistons.

== NBA career statistics ==
Legend
GP	Games played	GS	Games started	MPG	Minutes per game
FG%	Field goal percentage	3P%	3-point field goal percentage	FT%	Free throw percentage
RPG	Rebounds per game	APG	Assists per game	SPG	Steals per game
BPG	Blocks per game	PPG	Points per game	**Bold**	Career high
*	Led the league

=== Regular season ===
Year	Team	GP	GS	MPG	FG%	3P%	FT%	RPG	APG	SPG	BPG	PPG
2005–06	Portland	79	4	20.2	.442	.263	.800	2.0	2.8	.5	.0	6.7
2006–07	Portland	79	**79**	33.6	.454	.350	.871	2.6	5.3	**1.1**	.1	12.0
2007–08	Portland	82*	16	27.2	.431	.342	.867	2.9	3.8	.7	.0	9.9
2008–09	Indiana	82*	53	33.1	.453	.353	.852	3.4	4.1	**1.1**	.2	13.1
2009–10	Toronto	82*	43	27.4	.481	**.412**	.842	2.7	5.0	.7	.1	11.4
2010–11	Toronto	**13***	13	26.7	.393	.167	.870	3.2	4.5	**1.1**	.0	10.8
2010–11	New Orleans	**70***	2	19.6	.412	.345	.845	1.9	2.6	.6	.1	8.5
2011–12	New Orleans	45	39	**34.0**	.456	.348	.872	3.9	6.3	.7	.2	**15.6**
2012–13	Golden State	79	4	29.7	.452	.404	.843	3.1	5.5	.8	.1	12.9
2013–14	Cleveland	80	31	28.2	.410	.341	.839	2.8	4.1	.7	**.3**	9.5
2014–15	Brooklyn	80	27	28.0	.439	.267	.881	3.1	4.7	.9	.2	12.0
2015–16	Brooklyn	32	32	32.1	.391	.304	.893	**4.3**	**7.4**	**1.1**	.2	12.8
2016–17	New Orleans	2	0	16.5	**.667**	.000	**1.000**	.0	2.5	1.0	.0	3.0
2017–18	New York	62	56	25.0	.427	.291	.840	3.1	5.6	.6	.1	7.5
Career		867	399	27.8	.440	.343	.855	2.9	4.6	.8	.1	10.8

=== Playoffs ===
Year	Team	GP	GS	MPG	FG%	3P%	FT%	RPG	APG	SPG	BPG	PPG
2011	New Orleans	6	0	18.5	.353	.000	.688	2.5	2.2	.2	.2	5.8
2013	Golden State	**12**	**4**	**35.5**	.506	.292	.896	**4.4**	**4.7**	.9	**.3**	**17.2**
2015	Brooklyn	6	0	25.5	**.519**	**.333**	**1.000**	4.2	4.5	**1.2**	.2	12.3
Career		24	4	28.8	.488	.273	.870	3.9	4.0	.8	.3	13.1

== Personal life ==
Former NBA player Chris Duhon is Jack's cousin.
