= Keith McLeod =

American basketball player (born 1979)

Personal information
- Born: November 5, 1979 (age 47) Canton, Ohio, U.S.
- Listed height: 6 ft 2 in (1.88 m)
- Listed weight: 190 lb (86 kg)

Career information
- High school: Canton McKinley (Canton, Ohio)
- College: Bowling Green (1998–2002)
- NBA draft: 2002: undrafted
- Playing career: 2002–2014
- Position: Point guard
- Number: 4, 25, 20

Career history
- 2002: Saint Joseph Express
- 2002–2003: Mabo Prefabbricati Livorno
- 2003–2004: Minnesota Timberwolves
- 2004: Yakima Sun Kings
- 2004: Lottomatica Virtus Roma
- 2004–2006: Utah Jazz
- 2006–2007: Golden State Warriors
- 2007: Indiana Pacers
- 2008: Montepaschi Siena
- 2008–2010: Albuquerque Thunderbirds
- 2010–2011: Panionios
- 2011–2012: Canton Charge
- 2012: Erie BayHawks
- 2012–2013: BC Kalev/Cramo
- 2013–2014: LF Basket Norrbotten

Career highlights
- MAC Player of the Year (2002); First-team All-MAC (2002)
- Stats at NBA.com
- Stats at Basketball Reference

Keith McLeod (born November 5, 1979) is an American former professional basketball player and current varsity boys basketball head coach at East Canton High School in Canton, Ohio. He is 6 ft 2 in (1.88 m) tall. He has also played in the NBA for the Minnesota Timberwolves, Utah Jazz, Golden State Warriors and Indiana Pacers, in the CBA for the Yakima Sun Kings, in the USBL for the Saint Joseph Express, in the NBA D-League with the Albuquerque Thunderbirds, Canton Charge, and Erie BayHawks, and in the Italian top league for Mabo Prefabbricati Livorno, Lottomatica Virtus Roma and Montepaschi Siena.

== College career ==
In 2001, he was named in the All-MAC second-team. McLeod was the 2002 MAC men's basketball player of the year, leading the Bowling Green to the MAC championship game and a berth in the NIT. At the time of his graduation he was the school's second all-time leading scorer with 1,895 points.

== Professional career ==
He was not taken in the 2002 NBA draft, but was selected in the 2002 USBL Draft by the Saint Joseph Express, and in the 2002 CBA Draft by the Yakima Sun Kings.

He was traded by the Jazz on July 13, 2006, to the Golden State Warriors - along with Devin Brown and Andre Owens - for Derek Fisher.

On January 17, 2007, McLeod was dealt to the Indiana Pacers along with teammates Mike Dunleavy Jr., Ike Diogu and Troy Murphy for Stephen Jackson, Al Harrington, Sarunas Jasikevicius and Josh Powell.

On July 11, 2008, McLeod signed a one-year deal with the Dallas Mavericks. He was waived by the Mavericks on October 23, 2008 (before ever playing a game for them), and later played for the Albuquerque Thunderbirds of the NBA D-League. McLeod never made his way back into the NBA and his final game was played on April 18, 2007, during his time with the Pacers. On that day, the Pacers lost to the Washington Wizards with McLeod recording 11 points, 4 rebounds, and 3 assists.

On September 1, 2010, McLeod signed a 1-year deal with the Greek club Panionios B.C.

McLeod signed with the Canton Charge of the NBA D-League in 2011. He was later traded to the Erie BayHawks.

In October 2012, McLeod joined BC Kalev/Cramo of Estonia and poured in 25 points in his first game in the VTB League for the club, including a game winning basket at the buzzer.

On June 13, 2016, McLeod agreed to become an assistant to head coach Matt Hackenberg on the Canton Glenoak High School boys varsity basketball team. His primary focus will be on player development with the Golden Eagles.

== Education ==
McLeod attended Canton McKinley High School and graduated with a BS in Computer Science from Bowling Green State University.
