= Roy Hibbert =

American basketball player (born 1986)

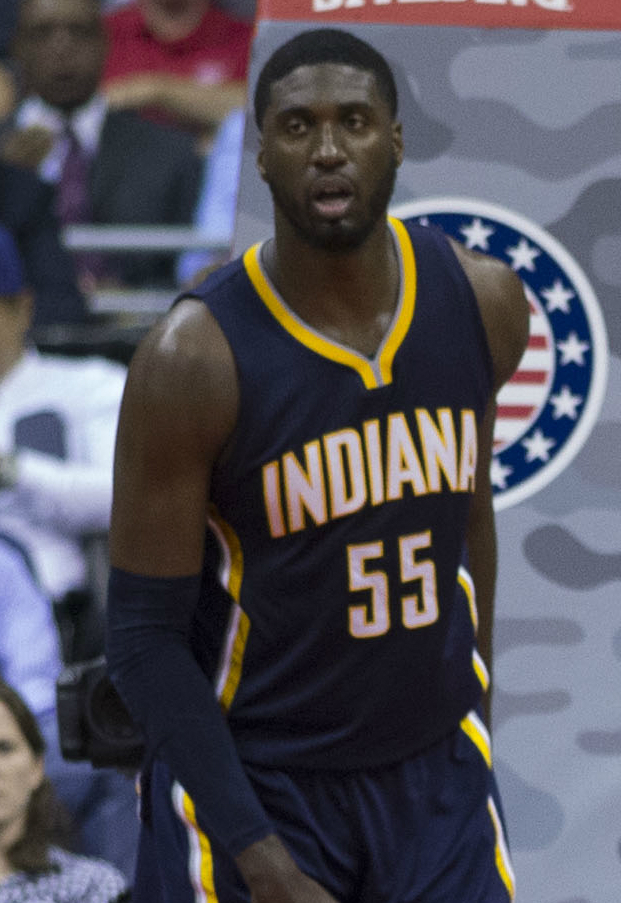
- Hibbert with the Indiana Pacers in 2014

Personal information
- Born: December 11, 1986 (age 39) Queens, New York, U.S.
- Listed height: 7 ft 2 in (2.18 m)
- Listed weight: 270 lb (122 kg)

Career information
- High school: Georgetown Prep (North Bethesda, Maryland)
- College: Georgetown (2004–2008)
- NBA draft: 2008: 1st round, 17th overall pick
- Drafted by: Toronto Raptors
- Playing career: 2008–2017
- Position: Center
- Number: 55, 17, 34
- Coaching career: 2019–2022

Career history

Playing
- 2008–2015: Indiana Pacers
- 2015–2016: Los Angeles Lakers
- 2016–2017: Charlotte Hornets
- 2017: Denver Nuggets

Coaching
- 2019–2022: Philadelphia 76ers (player development)

Career highlights
- 2× NBA All-Star (2012, 2014); NBA All-Defensive Second Team (2014); Consensus second-team All-American (2008); 2× First-team All-Big East (2007, 2008)

Career NBA statistics
- Points: 6,611 (10.0 ppg)
- Rebounds: 4,173 (6.3 rpg)
- Blocks: 1,146 (1.7 bpg)
- Stats at NBA.com
- Stats at Basketball Reference

Roy Denzil Hibbert (born December 11, 1986) is a Jamaican-American former professional basketball player. He is a two-time NBA All-Star, and earned NBA All-Defensive Second Team honors in 2014 with the Indiana Pacers. Hibbert was the runner-up for the NBA Defensive Player of the Year Award in the 2013–14 NBA season, placing second behind Joakim Noah.

Hibbert played college basketball for the Georgetown Hoyas and was named a consensus second-team All-American as a senior in 2008. He was drafted 17th overall in the 2008 NBA draft by the Toronto Raptors and was subsequently traded to the Indiana Pacers on draft night. Hibbert has represented the Jamaica national team in international competition, being eligible because of his dual U.S. and Jamaican citizenship.

== Early life ==
Hibbert was born in Queens, New York City to Roy Sr. and Patty Hibbert. His father is originally from Jamaica and his mother from Trinidad. The family moved to Adelphi, Maryland, when Roy was two. Around that time, the New York Post states, his parents introduced him to basketball after they had "tried to get him to play tennis, then golf, then the piano".

== College career ==
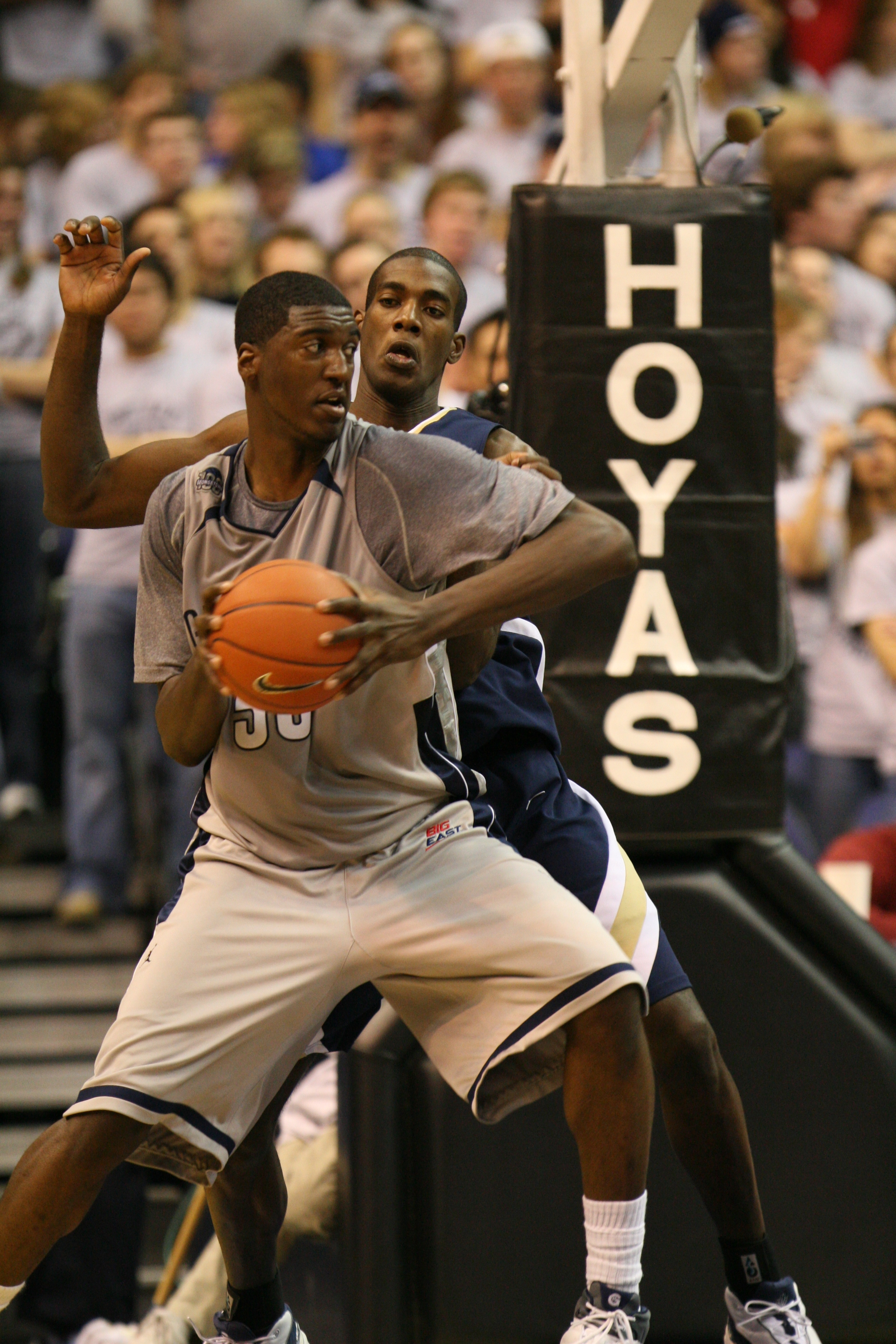
Hibbert with the Georgetown Hoyas in December 2006

Hibbert was named to the All-Big East Second Team in 2006 along with teammate Jeff Green. In 2007, he and Green were unanimous selections to the All-Big East First Team, with Green earning Big East Player of the Year honors. The two led the Hoyas to victory in the 2007 Big East Conference Championship for the first time since 1989 against the Pittsburgh Panthers; Hibbert contributed a double-double with 18 points and 11 rebounds. Before the 2007–08 season he was named Big East's preseason player of the year. He was also named a pre-season All-American along with the likes of Tyler Hansbrough, whose North Carolina Tar Heels were upset by Hibbert's Hoyas in the Elite Eight of the 2007 NCAA Tournament.

Hibbert had repeatedly said that he planned to play all four years and graduate from Georgetown, continuing the tradition of graduating Hoya centers such as Patrick Ewing, Alonzo Mourning and Dikembe Mutombo. However, his performance in helping to lead the Hoyas to the 2007 Final Four catapulted him into lottery pick status. Hibbert declared his eligibility for the 2007 NBA draft, but did not sign with an agent. On May 23, 2007, Hibbert announced he would return to school for his senior season. Hibbert said of Georgetown, "My heart was here. ... I feel like I have unfinished business here." Following the Hoyas' upset loss to Davidson and Stephen Curry in the second round of the 2008 NCAA Tournament, Hibbert's collegiate career came to a close.

In college, Hibbert was often referred to as the "Big Stiff" by reporters and fans.

== Professional career ==
=== Indiana Pacers (2008–2015) ===
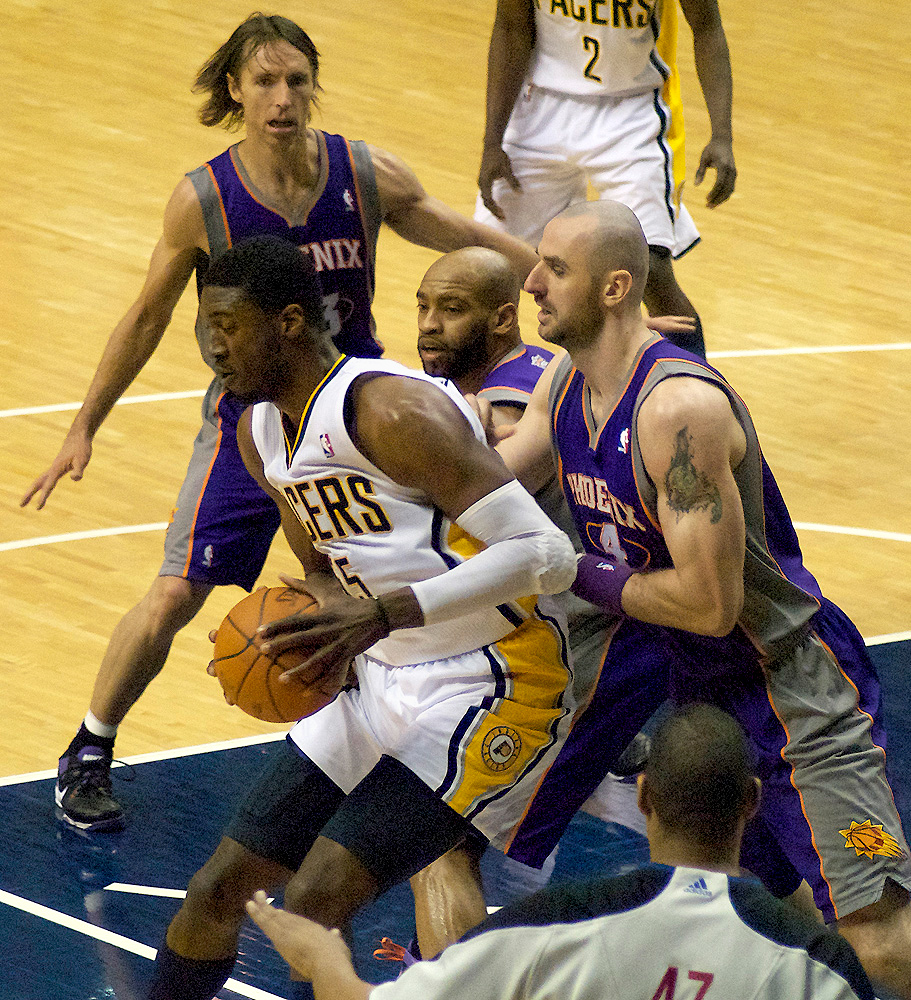
Hibbert posts up Marcin Gortat in February 2011

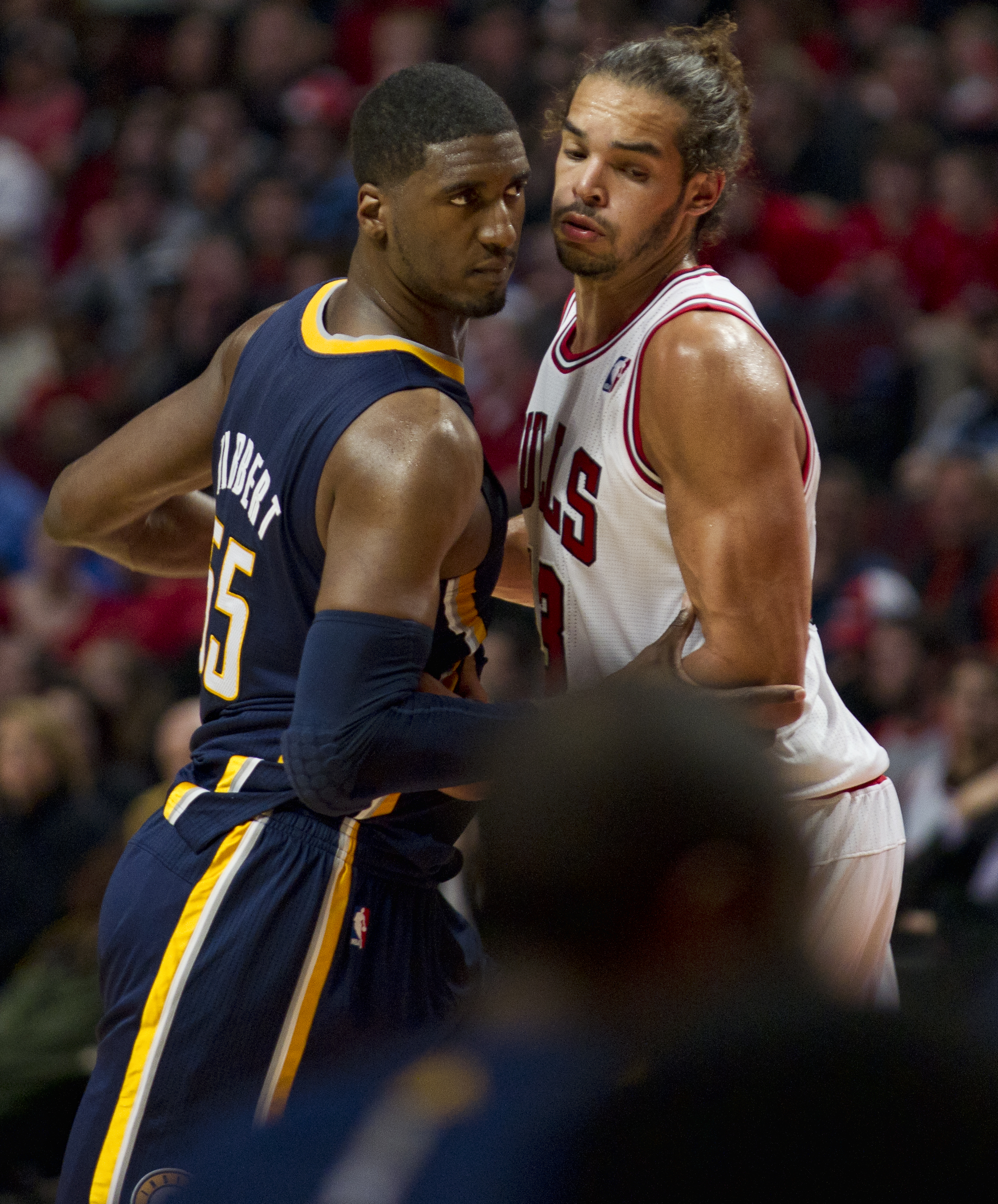
Hibbert battling Joakim Noah of the Chicago Bulls for position in December 2011

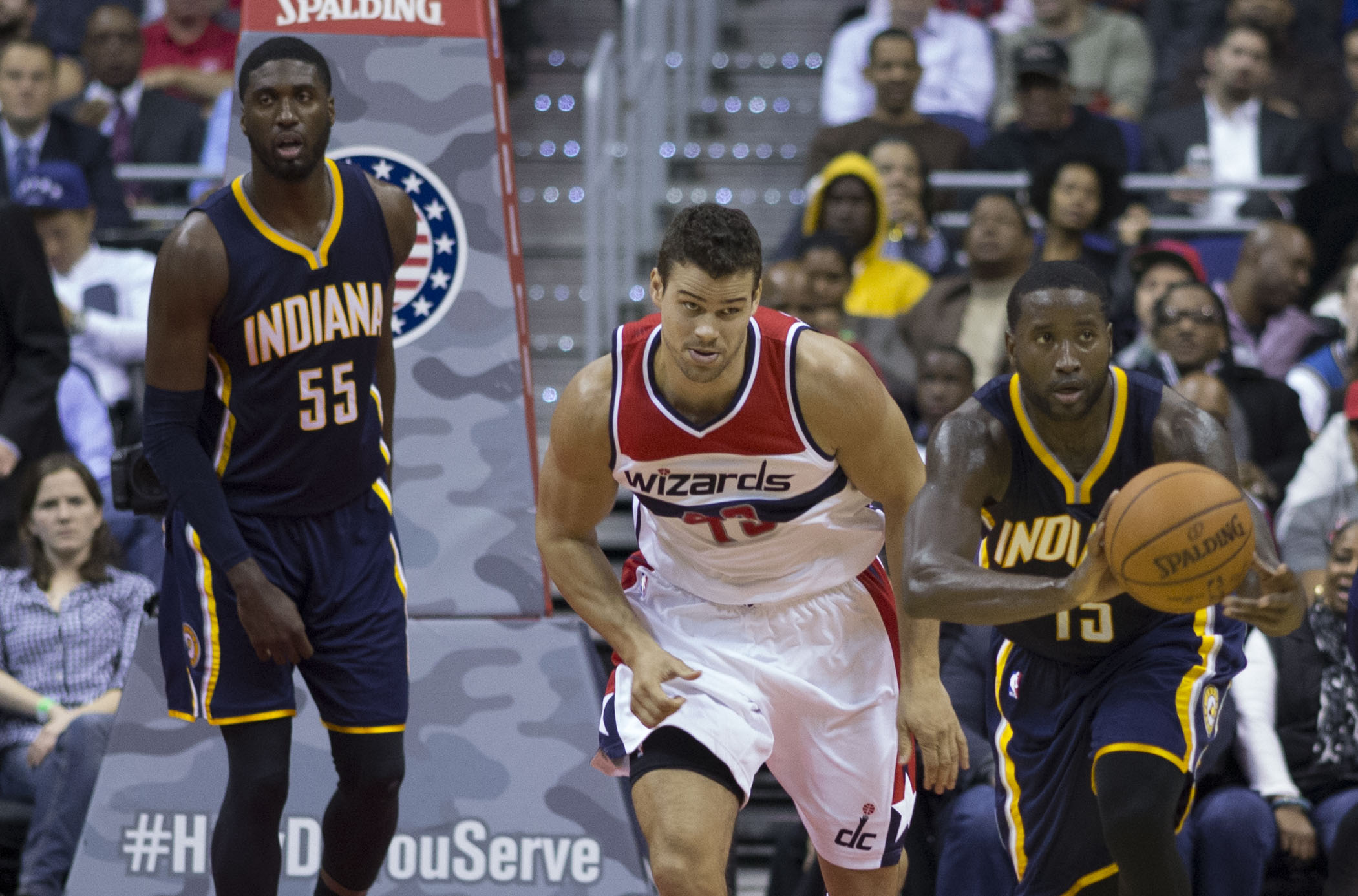
Hibbert with the Indiana Pacers in November 2014

Hibbert was drafted 17th overall by the Toronto Raptors in the 2008 NBA draft. On July 9, 2008, his rights were traded to the Indiana Pacers, along with T. J. Ford, for Jermaine O'Neal. On July 15, he signed his first professional contract with the Pacers.

Hibbert was selected to the 2012 NBA All-Star Game as a reserve for the East. He played 10 minutes and scored three points, going 1–3 from the field. In Game 1 of the first round of the 2012 NBA playoffs against the Orlando Magic, Hibbert recorded nine blocks.

On July 13, 2012, Hibbert re-signed with the Pacers on a reported four-year, $58 million contract, matching the offer sheet from the Portland Trail Blazers. On November 21, 2012, Hibbert set a career-high by recording 11 blocks as part of a 10-point, 11-rebound, 11-block triple-double in a victory against the New Orleans Hornets. His 11 blocks also broke the franchise record for most blocks in a single game, and Hibbert became only the second player in Pacers history (alongside Jermaine O'Neal) to record a points-rebounds-blocks triple-double. In Game 3 of a 2013 Eastern Conference Semifinals series against the New York Knicks, Hibbert recorded 24 points and 12 rebounds in a Pacers win. In Game 6, Hibbert recorded 25 points and 12 rebounds, along with five blocks, including a significant block on Carmelo Anthony, which led the Pacers to the 2013 Eastern Conference Finals. Hibbert averaged 15.8 points and 3.8 blocks in this series.

Hibbert was selected as an All-Star reserve for the East in 2014. He played 12 minutes and tallied eight points on 4–5 shooting. At the end of the season, Hibbert finished second in the Defensive Player of the Year voting with 166 out of the 1125, losing to Joakim Noah, who had 555 of the points. Hibbert averaged 2.2 blocks per game. During the 2014 NBA playoffs, Hibbert went scoreless in games 5 and 6 of the Pacers' first round match against the eighth seed, Atlanta Hawks. Hibbert was the second All-Star to ever go scoreless in consecutive games in the playoffs, the first being Jim King in 1968. Hibbert would also have scoreless games in Game 1 of the semifinals (against the Washington Wizards) and in Game 4 of the conference finals (against the Miami Heat). By the end of the 2014 postseason, Hibbert had four scoreless postseason games, setting an NBA record for most scoreless NBA postseason games by a current All-Star. Hibbert's season ended in the Eastern Conference Finals as the Pacers were eliminated by the Miami Heat in six games, adding history to the Heat–Pacers rivalry.

On June 29, 2015, Hibbert exercised his player option with the Pacers for the 2015–16 season.

=== Los Angeles Lakers (2015–2016) ===
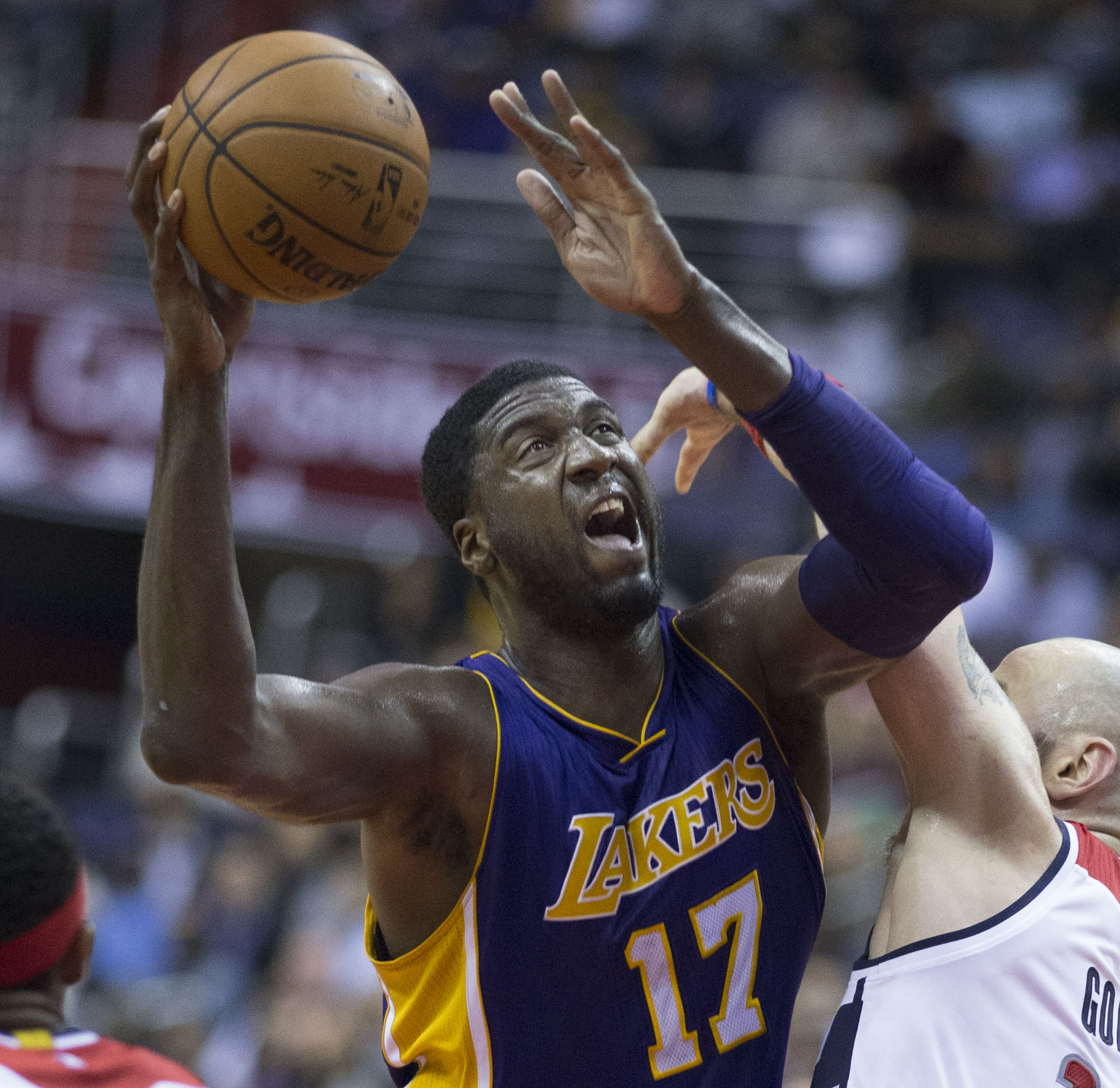
Hibbert with the Los Angeles Lakers in December 2015

On July 9, 2015, Hibbert was traded to the Los Angeles Lakers in exchange for a second-round pick in the 2019 NBA draft (Eric Paschall), which Indiana turned into Rakeem Christmas. He made his debut for the Lakers in their season opener on October 28, 2015, recording 12 points and 10 rebounds in a 112–111 loss to the Minnesota Timberwolves. Hibbert started in 81 of 82 games, also playing alongside Kobe Bryant in his last NBA season.

=== Charlotte Hornets (2016–2017) ===
On July 7, 2016, Hibbert signed with the Charlotte Hornets. He made his debut for the Hornets in their season opener on October 26, 2016, recording 15 points and nine rebounds in a 107–96 win over the Milwaukee Bucks. On January 18, 2017, Hibbert scored a season-high 16 points on 7-of-8 shooting in a 107–85 win over the Portland Trail Blazers. On the Hornets, he played alongside 4x NBA All-Star Kemba Walker.

=== Denver Nuggets (2017) ===
On February 2, 2017, Hibbert was traded, along with Spencer Hawes, to the Milwaukee Bucks in exchange for former Pacers teammate Miles Plumlee. However, before appearing in a game for the Bucks, he was traded again, this time to the Denver Nuggets on February 23, in exchange for a protected 2019 second-round draft pick. The Nuggets renounced their free agent exception rights on Hibbert during the subsequent off-season, making him an unrestricted free agent. In Denver, Hibbert played with a young Nikola Jokić.

On July 17, 2018, Hibbert announced his retirement.

== Coaching career ==
On August 9, 2019, it was reported that Hibbert was hired by the Philadelphia 76ers as a player development specialist on the coaching staff. He served this role until becoming a college basketball analyst for CBS Sports in 2022.

== National team career ==
In the summer of 2007, Hibbert was the starting center on the U.S. team, which was composed of college players, at the 2007 Pan-American Games. In 2009, he expressed an interest to play for the Jamaica national team. He has dual U.S. and Jamaican citizenship due to his father. He was named captain of the Jamaican team in 2010 and represented them in the 2010 Centrobasket.

== Personal life ==
In September 2014, Hibbert married his long-time girlfriend, Valerie Cooke. The couple had met in college at Georgetown University.

Hibbert works as a college basketball analyst for CBS Sports, serving this role during the 2022–23 and 2023–24 seasons. As of 2024, Hibbert lives in Maryland with his wife and four children. In 2023, Hibbert started his own YouTube channel, analyzing and reacting to news around the NBA.

In popular media, Hibbert appeared as a guest star playing himself on three episodes of the comedy series Parks and Recreation which aired between 2011 and 2013. He also appeared in an episode of The Eric Andre Show in 2016. Recently, Hibbert was interviewed by ESPN in 2020 to discuss the decline of the "Big Man" in the NBA, and again in 2023 by the Pacers to celebrate the 10th anniversary of his famous block against Carmelo Anthony in the 2013 NBA playoffs.

During the post-game press conference after Game 6 of the 2013 Eastern Conference Finals against the Miami Heat, Hibbert used the term "no homo" and later was fined $75,000 by the NBA for the remark. Hibbert apologized for his comments in a statement released by the Pacers: "I am apologizing for insensitive remarks made during the post-game press conference after our victory over Miami Saturday night", he said. "They were disrespectful and offensive and not a reflection of my personal views. I used a slang term that is not appropriate in any setting, private or public, and the language I used definitely has no place in a public forum, especially over live television. I apologize to those who I have offended, to our fans and to the Pacers' organization."

== NBA career statistics ==
Legend
GP	Games played	GS	Games started	MPG	Minutes per game
FG%	Field goal percentage	3P%	3-point field goal percentage	FT%	Free throw percentage
RPG	Rebounds per game	APG	Assists per game	SPG	Steals per game
BPG	Blocks per game	PPG	Points per game	**Bold**	Career high

=== Regular season ===
Year	Team	GP	GS	MPG	FG%	3P%	FT%	RPG	APG	SPG	BPG	PPG
2008–09	Indiana	69	42	14.4	.471	—	.667	3.5	.7	.3	1.1	7.1
2009–10	Indiana	**81**	69	25.1	.495	**.500**	.754	5.7	**2.0**	.4	1.6	11.7
2010–11	Indiana	**81**	80	27.7	.461	.000	.745	7.5	**2.0**	.4	1.8	12.7
2011–12	Indiana	65	65	**29.8**	.497	.000	.711	**8.8**	1.7	**.5**	2.0	**12.8**
2012–13	Indiana	79	79	28.7	.448	.250	.741	8.3	1.4	**.5**	**2.6**	11.9
2013–14	Indiana	**81**	**81**	29.7	.439	.400	.770	6.6	1.1	.4	2.2	10.8
2014–15	Indiana	76	76	25.3	.446	.000	**.824**	7.1	1.1	.2	1.6	10.6
2015–16	L.A. Lakers	**81**	**81**	23.2	.443	.000	.807	4.9	1.2	.4	1.4	5.9
2016–17	Charlotte	42	13	16.0	.542	—	.813	3.6	.5	.2	1.0	5.2
2016–17	Denver	6	0	1.8	**.667**	—	—	.3	.2	.0	.3	.7
Career		662	586	24.8	.465	.250	.755	6.3	1.3	.4	1.7	10.0
All-Star		2	0	11.0	.625	.000	1.000	4.0	1.5	.0	.0	5.5

=== Playoffs ===
Year	Team	GP	GS	MPG	FG%	3P%	FT%	RPG	APG	SPG	BPG	PPG
2011	Indiana	5	5	26.4	.444	—	.706	6.8	.6	**.4**	1.8	10.4
2012	Indiana	11	11	30.9	.500	**1.000**	.667	**11.2**	1.1	**.4**	**3.1**	11.7
2013	Indiana	**19**	**19**	**36.5**	**.511**	—	**.806**	9.9	**1.4**	.2	1.9	**17.0**
2014	Indiana	**19**	**19**	28.5	.449	.000	.772	5.5	.9	.2	1.4	9.3
Career		54	54	31.6	.486	.500	.765	8.3	1.1	.2	2.0	12.6

== See also ==
- List of National Basketball Association players with most blocks in a game
