= 2011–12 Indiana Pacers season =

NBA professional basketball team season

- Head coach: Frank Vogel
- General manager: Larry Bird
- Owners: Herb Simon
- Arena: Bankers Life Fieldhouse

Results
- Record: 42–24 (.636)
- Place: Division: 2nd (Central); Conference: 3rd (Eastern)
- Playoff finish: Conference semifinals (lost to Heat 2–4)
- Stats at Basketball Reference

Local media
- Television: Fox Sports Indiana
- Radio: WFNI

The 2011–12 Indiana Pacers season was the 45th season of the franchise and 36th season in the National Basketball Association (NBA). The Pacers finished the regular season with a 42–24 record and secured a spot in the 2012 NBA playoffs as the 3rd-best team in the Eastern Conference. After eliminating the Orlando Magic in the First Round in five games, Indiana lost in the East Semifinals series against the eventual champion Miami Heat in six games.

In the offseason, the team drafted future multi-time Finals MVP Kawhi Leonard, who was later traded to the San Antonio Spurs.

== Key dates ==
- June 23: The 2011 NBA draft took place at Prudential Center in Newark, New Jersey.
- December 26: The regular season started with a win against the Detroit Pistons.
- April 11: The Pacers secure a playoff spot with a win against the Cleveland Cavaliers.
- May 8: By eliminating the Orlando Magic in the first round of the 2012 NBA Playoffs, the Pacers win their first playoff series since 2005.

== 2011 NBA draft ==
Round	Pick	Player	Position	Nationality	College
1	15	Kawhi Leonard	SF	United States	San Diego State
2	42	Dāvis Bertāns	SF	Latvia	Union Olimpija

The Pacers entered the draft holding one first-round pick and one second-round pick. They used these picks to acquire future All-Star Kawhi Leonard and Dāvis Bertāns, respectively, but their rights were soon traded to the San Antonio Spurs for George Hill.

== Roster ==
2011–12 Indiana Pacers roster
Players

Pos.	No.	Player	Height	Weight	DOB	From
PF	17	Louis Amundson	6 ft 9 in (2.06 m)	225 lb (102 kg)	1982–12–07	UNLV
SG	28	Leandro Barbosa	6 ft 3 in (1.91 m)	194 lb (88 kg)	1982–11–28	Brazil
PG	2	Darren Collison	6 ft 0 in (1.83 m)	160 lb (73 kg)	1987–08–23	UCLA
C	44	Kyrylo Fesenko (waived)	7 ft 1 in (2.16 m)	280 lb (127 kg)	1986–12–24	Ukraine
C	10	Jeff Foster	6 ft 11 in (2.11 m)	250 lb (113 kg)	1977-01-16	Texas State
SG	24	Paul George	6 ft 8 in (2.03 m)	215 lb (98 kg)	1990–05–02	Fresno State
SF	33	Danny Granger	6 ft 8 in (2.03 m)	228 lb (103 kg)	1983–04–20	New Mexico
PF	50	Tyler Hansbrough	6 ft 9 in (2.06 m)	250 lb (113 kg)	1985–11–03	North Carolina
C	55	Roy Hibbert	7 ft 2 in (2.18 m)	260 lb (118 kg)	1986–12–11	Georgetown
PG	3	George Hill	6 ft 2 in (1.88 m)	180 lb (82 kg)	1986–05–04	IUPUI
SF	1	Dahntay Jones	6 ft 6 in (1.98 m)	225 lb (102 kg)	1980–12–27	Duke
C	29	Jeff Pendergraph	6 ft 10 in (2.08 m)	240 lb (109 kg)	1987–04–29	Arizona State
PG	12	A. J. Price	6 ft 2 in (1.88 m)	185 lb (84 kg)	1986–10–07	Connecticut
SG	6	Lance Stephenson	6 ft 5 in (1.96 m)	220 lb (100 kg)	1990–09–05	Cincinnati
PF	21	David West	6 ft 9 in (2.06 m)	240 lb (109 kg)	1980–08–29	Xavier

Coaches
Head coach
- Frank Vogel
Assistant(s)
- Brian Shaw
- Dan Burke
- Jim Boylen

Legend
- (DP) Unsigned draft pick
- (FA) Free agent
- (S) Suspended
- Injured

== Pre-season ==
Due to the 2011 NBA lockout negotiations, the programmed pre-season schedule, along with the first two weeks of the regular season were scrapped, and a two-game pre-season was set for each team once the lockout concluded.

2011 pre-season game log
Pre-season: 0–2 (home: 0–1; road: 0–1)

Game	Date	Team	Score	High points	High rebounds	High assists	Location Attendance	Record
1	December 16	Chicago	L 86–95	Tyler Hansbrough (19)	Tyler Hansbrough (11)	Darren Collison (4)	Conseco Fieldhouse; 14,013	0–1
2	December 21	@ Chicago	L 85–93	Tyler Hansbrough (24)	Tyler Hansbrough (13)	Darren Collison (5)	United Center; 21,659	0–2

2011–12 season schedule

== Regular season ==
=== Standings ===
Central Division	W	L	PCT	GB	Home	Road	Div	GP
z-Chicago Bulls	50	16	.758	–	26–7	24–9	13–1	66
x-Indiana Pacers	42	24	.636	8	23–10	19–14	9–4	66
Milwaukee Bucks	31	35	.470	19	17–16	14–19	7–8	66
Detroit Pistons	25	41	.379	25	18–15	7–26	4–11	66
Cleveland Cavaliers	21	45	.318	29	11–22	10–23	3–12	66

Eastern Conference
#	Team	W	L	PCT	GB	GP
1	z-Chicago Bulls	50	16	.758	–	66
2	y-Miami Heat *	46	20	.697	4.0	66
3	x-Indiana Pacers *	42	24	.636	8.0	66
4	y-Boston Celtics	39	27	.591	11.0	66
5	x-Atlanta Hawks	40	26	.606	10.0	66
6	x-Orlando Magic	37	29	.561	13.0	66
7	x-New York Knicks	36	30	.545	14.0	66
8	x-Philadelphia 76ers	35	31	.530	15.0	66
9	Milwaukee Bucks	31	35	.470	19.0	66
10	Detroit Pistons	25	41	.379	25.0	66
11	Toronto Raptors	23	43	.348	27.0	66
12	New Jersey Nets	22	44	.333	28.0	66
13	Cleveland Cavaliers	21	45	.318	29.0	66
14	Washington Wizards	20	46	.303	30.0	66
15	Charlotte Bobcats	7	59	.106	43.0	66

=== Game log ===
2011–12 game log
Total: 42–24 (home: 23–10; road: 19–14)
December: 3–1 (home: 2–0; road: 1–1)

Game	Date	Team	Score	High points	High rebounds	High assists	Location Attendance	Record
1	December 26	Detroit	W 91–79	Danny Granger, Roy Hibbert (16)	Roy Hibbert (14)	Darren Collison (5)	Bankers Life Fieldhouse; 18,165	1–0
2	December 28	@ Toronto	W 90–85	Danny Granger (21)	Roy Hibbert (10)	Darren Collison (12)	Air Canada Centre; 19,800	2–0
3	December 30	Cleveland	W 98–91 (OT)	Danny Granger (22)	Roy Hibbert (13)	Danny Granger, Darren Collison (4)	Bankers Life Fieldhouse; 13,004	3–0
4	December 31	@ Detroit	L 88–96	George Hill, Tyler Hansbrough (16)	Five players (5)	Darren Collison (8)	The Palace of Auburn Hills; 8,824	3–1

January : 11–5 (home: 4–1; road: 7–4)

Game	Date	Team	Score	High points	High rebounds	High assists	Location Attendance	Record
5	January 2	@ New Jersey	W 108–94	Paul George (21)	Tyler Hansbrough (7)	Darren Collison (7)	Prudential Center; 12,519	4–1
6	January 4	@ Miami	L 83–118	Roy Hibbert (16)	Roy Hibbert (12)	Paul George (3)	American Airlines Arena; 20,201	4–2
7	January 6	@ Boston	W 87–74	Danny Granger (15)	Roy Hibbert (12)	Darren Collison (4)	TD Garden; 18,624	5–2
8	January 7	Charlotte	W 99–77	Roy Hibbert (20)	Darren Collison, Roy Hibbert (8)	Darren Collison (4)	Bankers Life Fieldhouse; 17,226	6–2
9	January 9	@ Philadelphia	L 86–96	Roy Hibbert (19)	David West (11)	Paul George (5)	Wells Fargo Center; 8,612	6–3
10	January 11	Atlanta	W 96–84	Danny Granger (24)	Roy Hibbert (11)	Darren Collison (6)	Bankers Life Fieldhouse; 10,334	7–3
11	January 13	@ Toronto	W 95–90	George Hill (22)	Roy Hibbert (9)	Darren Collison (5)	Air Canada Centre; 15,302	8–3
12	January 14	Boston	W 97–83	Danny Granger (21)	Roy Hibbert (9)	Darren Collison (4)	Bankers Life Fieldhouse; 14,203	9–3
13	January 18	@ Sacramento	L 88–92	Darren Collison, Danny Granger (16)	Paul George (9)	Roy Hibbert (4)	Power Balance Pavilion; 14,170	9–4
14	January 20	@ Golden State	W 94–91	Danny Granger (26)	Roy Hibbert (16)	Darren Collison (9)	Oracle Arena; 17,621	10–4
15	January 22	@ L. A. Lakers	W 98–96	Roy Hibbert (18)	David West (9)	Darren Collison (7)	Staples Center; 18,997	11–4
16	January 24	Orlando	L 83–102	Danny Granger, Roy Hibbert (16)	Roy Hibbert (12)	Danny Granger, Roy Hibbert (3)	Bankers Life Fieldhouse; 12,760	11–5
17	January 25	@ Chicago	W 95–90	Danny Granger (22)	Danny Granger (9)	Darren Collison (8)	United Center; 21,755	12–5
18	January 27	@ Boston	L 87–94	Danny Granger (21)	Paul George (9)	Darren Collison (4)	TD Garden; 18,624	12–6
19	January 29	@ Orlando	W 106–85	Danny Granger (24)	David West, Paul George (7)	Darren Collison (10)	Amway Center; 18,846	13–6
20	January 31	New Jersey	W 106–99	Paul George (24)	Roy Hibbert (14)	Danny Granger, Lance Stephenson (5)	Bankers Life Fieldhouse; 11,408	14–6

February: 8–6 (home: 5–3; road: 3–3)

Game	Date	Team	Score	High points	High rebounds	High assists	Location Attendance	Record
21	February 1	@ Minnesota	W 109–99	Danny Granger (36)	Roy Hibbert (9)	Darren Collison (9)	Target Center; 15,017	15–6
22	February 3	@ Dallas	W 98–87	Paul George (30)	Roy Hibbert (14)	Darren Collison (6)	American Airlines Center; 20,146	16–6
23	February 4	Orlando	L 81–85	Danny Granger (19)	David West, Danny Granger (7)	Paul George (5)	Bankers Life Fieldhouse; 18,165	16–7
24	February 7	Utah	W 104–99	Darren Collison (25)	Roy Hibbert (10)	Darren Collison (5)	Bankers Life Fieldhouse; 11,006	17–7
25	February 8	@ Atlanta	L 87–97	Josh Smith (28)	Roy Hibbert (13)	Darren Collison (9)	Philips Arena; 16,288	17–8
26	February 10	@ Memphis	L 92–98	David West (22)	David West (13)	Mike Conley Jr. (6)	FedEx Forum; 16,281	17–9
27	February 11	Denver	L 109–113	Ty Lawson (27)	David West (7)	Darren Collison (7)	Bankers Life Fieldhouse; 15,313	17–10
28	February 14	Miami	L 90–105	LeBron James (23)	LeBron James (9)	LeBron James (7)	Bankers Life Fieldhouse; 18,165	17–11
29	February 15	@ Cleveland	L 87–98	Kyrie Irving (22)	David West (10)	Kyrie Irving (5)	Quicken Loans Arena; 12,712	17–12
30	February 16	New Jersey	W 93–88	Danny Granger (32)	Roy Hibbert (11)	Paul George (5)	Bankers Life Fieldhouse; 11,117	18–12
31	February 19	Charlotte	W 108–73	Roy Hibbert (18)	Roy Hibbert (14)	Darren Collison (6)	Bankers Life Fieldhouse; 11,673	19–12
32	February 21	New Orleans	W 117–108 (OT)	Roy Hibbert (30)	Roy Hibbert (13)	Jarrett Jack (10)	Bankers Life Fieldhouse; 10,508	20–12
33	February 22	@ Charlotte	W 102–88	Tyler Hansbrough (22)	Louis Amundson (12)	Boris Diaw (8)	Time Warner Cable Arena; 13,458	21–12
34	February 28	Golden State	W 102–78	Danny Granger (25)	Roy Hibbert (9)	Darren Collison (5)	Bankers Life Fieldhouse; 12,111	22–12

March: 8–9 (home: 5–3; road: 3–6)

Game	Date	Team	Score	High points	High rebounds	High assists	Location Attendance	Record
35	March 3	@ New Orleans	W 102–84	Danny Granger (20)	David West (13)	Darren Collison (4)	New Orleans Arena; 16,379	23–12
36	March 5	@ Chicago	L 72–92	Paul George (21)	David West (9)	Roy Hibbert (4)	United Center; 22,106	23–13
37	March 6	Atlanta	L 96–101	David West (24)	Danny Granger; Roy Hibbert (8)	Darren Collison (4)	Bankers Life Fieldhouse; 11,393	23–14
38	March 10	@ Miami	L 91–93 (OT)	Danny Granger (19)	David West (10)	Darren Collison (6)	American Airlines Arena; 20,154	23–15
39	March 11	@ Orlando	L 94–107	Paul George (22)	Paul George (8)	Darren Collison (4)	Amway Center; 18,846	23–16
40	March 13	Portland	W 92–75	Louis Amundson (21)	David West (10)	A. J. Price (6)	Bankers Life Fieldhouse; 10,933	24–16
41	March 14	Philadelphia	W 111–94	Danny Granger (20)	Roy Hibbert (9)	Roy Hibbert (5)	Bankers Life Fieldhouse; 13,081	25–16
42	March 16	@ New York	L 100–115	Darren Collison (15)	Paul George; Tyler Hansbrough (6)	Darren Collison; George Hill (4)	Madison Square Garden; 19,763	25–17
43	March 17	New York	L 88–102	Roy Hibbert (24)	Roy Hibbert (12)	Paul George (4)	Bankers Life Fieldhouse; 18,165	25–18
44	March 20	L. A. Clippers	W 102–89	Danny Granger (25)	Danny Granger (8)	George Hill (6)	Bankers Life Fieldhouse; 14,901	26–18
45	March 22	@ Washington	W 85–83	Roy Hibbert (19)	Roy Hibbert (9)	Darren Collison (5)	Verizon Center; 15,874	27–18
46	March 23	Phoenix	L 111–113	Danny Granger (28)	David West (8)	Darren Collison (7)	Bankers Life Fieldhouse; 14,786	27–19
47	March 24	@ Milwaukee	W 125–104	George Hill (24)	Roy Hibbert (9)	George Hill (5)	Bradley Center; 16,207	28–19
48	March 26	Miami	W 105–90	Danny Granger (25)	David West (12)	David West (4)	Bankers Life Fieldhouse; 17,415	29–19
49	March 28	@ New Jersey	L 84–100	Paul George (22)	Roy Hibbert (7)	Darren Collison (7)	Prudential Center; 10,817	29–20
50	March 29	Washington	W 93–89	Danny Granger (25)	David West (8)	Darren Collison (7)	Bankers Life Fieldhouse; 11,505	30–20
51	March 31	@ San Antonio	L 103–112	Danny Granger; Paul George (18)	Roy Hibbert; George Hill (7)	George Hill (6)	AT&T Center; 18,581	30–21

April: 12–3 (home: 7–3; road: 5–0)

Game	Date	Team	Score	High points	High rebounds	High assists	Location Attendance	Record
52	April 1	@ Houston	W 104–102 (OT)	Danny Granger (32)	Tyler Hansbrough (10)	Darren Collison (7)	Toyota Center; 18,197	31–21
53	April 3	New York	W 112–104	Danny Granger (27)	Paul George (8)	George Hill (6)	Bankers Life Fieldhouse; 17,042	32–21
54	April 4	@ Washington	W 109–96	Danny Granger (20)	Louis Amundson (8)	Darren Collison (11)	Verizon Center; 14,561	33–21
55	April 6	Oklahoma City	W 103–98	Danny Granger (26)	Paul George (16)	George Hill (4)	Bankers Life Fieldhouse; 18,165	34–21
56	April 7	Boston	L 72–86	Danny Granger (20)	Roy Hibbert (17)	Darren Collison; Paul George (3)	Bankers Life Fieldhouse; 16,892	34–22
57	April 9	Toronto	W 103–98	Danny Granger; George Hill (18)	George Hill; Tyler Hansbrough (7)	George Hill; A. J. Price (4)	Bankers Life Fieldhouse; 11,021	35–22
58	April 11	@ Cleveland	W 104–98	Danny Granger (23)	Roy Hibbert (11)	Roy Hibbert; Paul George (5)	Quicken Loans Arena; 14,307	36–22
59	April 13	Cleveland	W 102–83	Danny Granger (18)	Roy Hibbert (10)	George Hill (7)	Bankers Life Fieldhouse; 13,356	37–22
60	April 14	@ Milwaukee	W 105–99	Roy Hibbert (23)	Roy Hibbert (14)	Danny Granger; George Hill (3)	Bradley Center; 15,143	38–22
61	April 16	Minnesota	W 111–88	David West (22)	Roy Hibbert (11)	Danny Granger (5)	Bankers Life Fieldhouse; 11,845	39–22
62	April 17	@ Philadelphia	W 102–97	Danny Granger (24)	Roy Hibbert (13)	George Hill (7)	Wells Fargo Center; 18,969	40–22
63	April 19	Milwaukee	W 118–109	Danny Granger (29)	David West (14)	George Hill (8)	Bankers Life Fieldhouse; 12,453	41–22
64	April 21	Philadelphia	L 106–109 (OT)	David West (32)	David West (12)	George Hill (5)	Bankers Life Fieldhouse; 17,701	41–23
65	April 23	Detroit	W 103–97	Paul George (27)	Paul George (10)	A.J. Price (6)	Bankers Life Fieldhouse; 13,584	42–23
66	April 25	Chicago	L 87–92	Lance Stephenson (22)	Louis Amundson (7)	George Hill (5)	Bankers Life Fieldhouse; 18,165	42–24

2011–12 season schedule

== Playoffs ==
=== Game log ===
2012 playoff game log
First round: 4–1 (home: 2–1; road: 2–0)

Game	Date	Team	Score	High points	High rebounds	High assists	Location Attendance	Series
1	April 28	Orlando	L 77–81	David West (19)	Roy Hibbert (13)	Darren Collison (5)	Bankers Life Fieldhouse; 18,165	0–1
2	April 30	Orlando	W 93–78	David West; Danny Granger; George Hill (18)	Roy Hibbert (13)	David West (4)	Bankers Life Fieldhouse; 18,165	1–1
3	May 2	@ Orlando	W 97–74	Danny Granger (26)	Roy Hibbert (10)	Paul George (4)	Amway Center; 18,846	2–1
4	May 5	@ Orlando	W 101–99 (OT)	David West (26)	David West (12)	Darren Collison (9)	Amway Center; 18,846	3–1
5	May 8	Orlando	W 105–87	Danny Granger (25)	David West (8)	Darren Collison (6)	Bankers Life Fieldhouse; 18,165	4–1

Conference Semi-finals: 2–4 (home: 1–2; road: 1–2)

Game	Date	Team	Score	High points	High rebounds	High assists	Location Attendance	Series
1	May 13	@ Miami	L 86–95	David West; Roy Hibbert (17)	David West (12)	Darren Collison (6)	American Airlines Arena; 19,600	0–1
2	May 15	@ Miami	W 78–75	David West (16)	Roy Hibbert; Paul George (11)	Danny Granger (3)	American Airlines Arena; 19,828	1–1
3	May 17	Miami	W 94–75	George Hill (20)	Roy Hibbert (18)	George Hill (5)	Bankers Life Fieldhouse; 18,165	2–1
4	May 20	Miami	L 93–101	Danny Granger (20)	Roy Hibbert (9)	Paul George (5)	Bankers Life Fieldhouse; 18,165	2–2
5	May 22	@ Miami	L 83–115	Paul George (11)	Roy Hibbert (12)	Paul George (3)	American Airlines Arena; 20,097	2–3
6	May 24	Miami	L 93–105	David West (24)	Paul George (10)	George Hill (5)	Bankers Life Fieldhouse; 18,165	2–4

2012 playoff schedule

== Player statistics ==
=== Regular season ===
Player	POS	GP	GS	MP	REB	AST	STL	BLK	PTS	MPG	RPG	APG	SPG	BPG	PPG
Paul George	SG	66	66	1,958	370	158	108	38	798	29.7	5.6	2.4	1.6	.6	12.1
David West	PF	66	66	1,925	433	140	52	46	842	29.2	6.6	2.1	.8	.7	12.8
Tyler Hansbrough	PF	66	0	1,442	290	30	54	9	614	21.8	4.4	.5	.8	.1	9.3
Roy Hibbert	C	65	65	1,937	572	108	32	128	834	29.8	8.8	1.7	.5	2.0	12.8
Dahntay Jones	SF	65	3	1,052	117	63	23	11	346	16.2	1.8	1.0	.4	.2	5.3
Danny Granger	SF	62	62	2,062	307	109	62	40	1,159	33.3	5.0	1.8	1.0	.6	18.7
Darren Collison	PG	60	56	1,878	187	287	49	14	621	31.3	3.1	4.8	.8	.2	10.4
Lou Amundson	PF	60	0	753	222	14	27	44	213	12.6	3.7	.2	.5	.7	3.6
George Hill	PG	50	9	1,274	151	145	42	17	481	25.5	3.0	2.9	.8	.3	9.6
A. J. Price	PG	44	1	568	61	86	20	2	172	12.9	1.4	2.0	.5	.0	3.9
Lance Stephenson	SG	42	1	442	53	46	21	5	106	10.5	1.3	1.1	.5	.1	2.5
Leandro Barbosa^{†}	SG	22	0	436	49	33	20	0	196	19.8	2.2	1.5	.9	.0	8.9
Jeff Ayres	C	20	1	106	33	4	3	2	34	5.3	1.7	.2	.2	.1	1.7
Jeff Foster	C	11	0	141	42	4	8	1	25	12.8	3.8	.4	.7	.1	2.3
Kyrylo Fesenko	C	3	0	17	9	1	2	0	8	5.7	3.0	.3	.7	.0	2.7

- ^{†} Denotes player spent time with another team in the season. Stats reflect time with the Pacers only.

=== Playoffs ===
Player	POS	GP	GS	MP	REB	AST	STL	BLK	PTS	MPG	RPG	APG	SPG	BPG	PPG
Danny Granger	SF	11	11	420	62	27	6	4	187	38.2	5.6	2.5	.5	.4	17.0
David West	PF	11	11	416	94	22	8	6	168	37.8	8.5	2.0	.7	.5	15.3
Paul George	SG	11	11	371	73	26	18	4	107	33.7	6.6	2.4	1.6	.4	9.7
George Hill	PG	11	11	346	25	32	13	3	148	31.5	2.3	2.9	1.2	.3	13.5
Roy Hibbert	C	11	11	340	123	12	4	34	129	30.9	11.2	1.1	.4	3.1	11.7
Leandro Barbosa	SG	11	0	223	24	14	5	1	63	20.3	2.2	1.3	.5	.1	5.7
Darren Collison	PG	11	0	205	14	33	14	0	96	18.6	1.3	3.0	1.3	.0	8.7
Tyler Hansbrough	PF	11	0	164	35	6	5	3	48	14.9	3.2	.5	.5	.3	4.4
Lou Amundson	PF	11	0	94	23	2	2	5	27	8.5	2.1	.2	.2	.5	2.5
Dahntay Jones	SF	7	0	58	7	3	1	0	17	8.3	1.0	.4	.1	.0	2.4
Lance Stephenson	SG	4	0	12	0	1	0	0	6	3.0	.0	.3	.0	.0	1.5
Jeff Ayres	C	4	0	9	2	0	0	0	2	2.3	.5	.0	.0	.0	.5
A. J. Price	PG	4	0	7	2	1	0	0	2	1.8	.5	.3	.0	.0	.5

== Awards ==
- Head coach Frank Vogel was named Eastern Conference Coach of the Month for April.
- Team president Larry Bird won the NBA Executive of the Year Award, becoming the first person in NBA history to also win the Most Valuable Player and Coach of the Year awards.

=== All-Star ===
- Roy Hibbert made his first All-Star appearance at the 2012 NBA All-Star Game.
- Paul George was selected to play in the BBVA Rising Stars Challenge and also participated in the Slam Dunk Contest.

== Disciplinary actions ==
- Danny Granger and David West received a $25,000 fine after an altercation during a game against the Milwaukee Bucks on April 19.
- Head coach Frank Vogel was fined $15,000 before the playoff series against the Miami Heat began, after making comments about the officiating.

== Transactions ==
=== Overview ===
Players Added

Via free agency

- Jeff Pendergraph
- David West

Via trade

- Louis Amundson
- Leandro Barbosa
- Kyrylo Fesenko
- George Hill
Players Lost

Via trade

- Brandon Rush

Via free agency

- Josh McRoberts
- T. J. Ford
- Mike Dunleavy Jr.
- Solomon Jones

Waived

- James Posey

=== Trades ===
June 23, 2011	To Indiana Pacers George Hill	To San Antonio Spurs Draft rights to Kawhi Leonard; Draft rights to Erazem Lorbek; Draft rights to Dāvis Bertāns
December 19, 2011	To Indiana Pacers Louis Amundson	To Golden State Warriors Brandon Rush
March 15, 2012	To Indiana Pacers Leandro Barbosa	To Toronto Raptors Conditional 2012 second-round draft pick. Cash considerations.

=== Free agents ===
Additions
Player	Date signed	Former team
David West	December 13	New Orleans Hornets
Kyrylo Fesenko	March 23	Utah Jazz

Subtractions
Player	Date signed	New team
Solomon Jones	January 3	Los Angeles Clippers
Josh McRoberts	December 14	Los Angeles Lakers

Many players signed with teams from other leagues due to the 2011 NBA lockout. FIBA allows players under NBA contracts to sign and play for teams from other leagues if the contracts have opt-out clauses that allow the players to return to the NBA if the lockout ends. The Chinese Basketball Association, however, only allows its clubs to sign foreign free agents who could play for at least the entire season.

Played in other leagues during lockout
Player	Date signed	New team	Opt-out clause
T. J. Ford	November 22	KK Zagreb (Croatia)	Yes

== See also ==
- 2011–12 NBA season
