= Karabo Poppy =

South African illustrator, graphic designer

- Born: Karabo Poppy Moletsane; 1992 (age 33–34); Vereeniging, South Africa
- Education: The Open Window (BA in Visual Communication)
- Occupations: Street artist; illustrator; Designer
- Years active: 2012–present
- Movement: Drawing; Painting
- Awards: The Loeries (Craft Gold Award. 2014)
- Website: karabo.behance

Karabo Poppy Moletsane (born 1992) is a South African illustrator, graphic designer, and street artist.

== Early life ==
Poppy was born in Vereeniging. She studied at Open Window Institute in Pretoria and has a degree in Visual Communication.

== Career ==
Poppy has done work for the Wall Street Journal, Google, Coca-Cola, and Nike, including designing shoes worn by LeBron James. She created the graphics for the first African series on Netflix, Queen Sono, and When They See Us. She collaborated with RICH MNISI on a unisex clothing collection, called Running Errands, in 2020. Her Utah Jazz mural is installed in Salt Lake City, Utah.

In 2021, she was commissioned by Wikipedia, along with Jasmina El Bouamraoui, to design 101 symbols for the 20th anniversary of Wikipedia.

Her murals are displayed as urban installations across Johannesburg, and have appeared in Times Square, in music videos, and on the Soweto Towers.

== Professional awards ==
She was listed on Forbes “30 Under 30” list in the 2019 creatives category. Her 2019 designs for Nike won the BASA Beyond Border Partnership Award. In 2020 she was named “Creative of the Year” by Between 10and5.
