= 2010–11 Indiana Pacers season =

NBA professional basketball team season

- Head coach: Jim O'Brien; Frank Vogel
- General manager: Larry Bird
- Owners: Herb Simon
- Arena: Conseco Fieldhouse

Results
- Record: 37–45 (.451)
- Place: Division: 2nd (Central); Conference: 8th (Eastern)
- Playoff finish: First Round (lost to Bulls 1–4)
- Stats at Basketball Reference

Local media
- Television: Fox Sports Indiana
- Radio: WFNI

The 2010–11 Indiana Pacers season was the 44th season of the franchise and 35th season in the National Basketball Association (NBA). With a victory over the Washington Wizards on April 6, 2011, the Pacers clinched their first playoff berth since 2006.

However, a first round loss to eventual league MVP Derrick Rose and the top-seeded Chicago Bulls ended the season for the Pacers.

On January 30, head coach Jim O'Brien was fired. Replacing him was interim head coach Frank Vogel, who would be named as permanent during the lockout following the season.

== 2010 NBA draft ==
Round	Pick	Player	Position	Nationality	College
1	10	Paul George	SF	United States	Fresno State
2	40	Lance Stephenson	SG	United States	Cincinnati
2	57	Ryan Reid	F	United States	Florida State

== Roster ==
2010-11 Indiana Pacers roster
Players

Pos.	No.	Player	Height	Weight	DOB	From
G	2	Darren Collison	6 ft 0 in (1.83 m)	160 lb (73 kg)		UCLA
G/F	17	Mike Dunleavy Jr.	6 ft 9 in (2.06 m)	230 lb (104 kg)		Duke
G	5	T. J. Ford	6 ft 0 in (1.83 m)	165 lb (75 kg)		Texas
C	10	Jeff Foster	6 ft 11 in (2.11 m)	250 lb (113 kg)		Texas State
G/F	24	Paul George	6 ft 9 in (2.06 m)	220 lb (100 kg)		Fresno State
G/F	33	Danny Granger	6 ft 8 in (2.03 m)	228 lb (103 kg)		New Mexico
F	50	Tyler Hansbrough	6 ft 9 in (2.06 m)	250 lb (113 kg)		North Carolina
C	55	Roy Hibbert	7 ft 2 in (2.18 m)	278 lb (126 kg)		Georgetown
G/F	1	Dahntay Jones	6 ft 6 in (1.98 m)	210 lb (95 kg)		Duke
F	44	Solomon Jones	6 ft 10 in (2.08 m)	245 lb (111 kg)		South Florida
F	32	Josh McRoberts	6 ft 10 in (2.08 m)	240 lb (109 kg)		Duke
G/F	41	James Posey	6 ft 8 in (2.03 m)	215 lb (98 kg)		Xavier
G	12	A. J. Price	6 ft 2 in (1.88 m)	181 lb (82 kg)		Connecticut
G	25	Brandon Rush	6 ft 6 in (1.98 m)	210 lb (95 kg)		Kansas
G	6	Lance Stephenson	6 ft 5 in (1.96 m)	210 lb (95 kg)		Cincinnati

Coaches
Head coach
- Jim O'Brien(Saint Joseph's)
- Frank Vogel (Kentucky)
Assistant(s)
- Dan Burke (Portland State)
- Jay DeFruscio (Ursinus)
- Walter McCarty (Kentucky)
- Vitaly Potapenko (Wright State)

Legend
- (DP) Unsigned draft pick
- (FA) Free agent
- (S) Suspended
- Injured

== Pre-season ==
=== Game log ===
2010 pre-season game log
Pre-season: 3–4 (home: 2–1; road: 1–3)

Game	Date	Team	Score	High points	High rebounds	High assists	Location Attendance	Record
1	October 6	@ Memphis	L 85–87	Roy Hibbert (18)	Roy Hibbert (10)	Darren Collison (5)	FedExForum; 8,618	0–1
2	October 8	Orlando	L 86–93	Darren Collison (18)	James Posey, Paul George (5)	Roy Hibbert, Mike Dunleavy Jr. (2)	Conseco Fieldhouse; 10,001	0–2
3	October 9	@ Houston	L 92–126	Roy Hibbert (17)	Roy Hibbert (9)	Darren Collison (4)	Toyota Center; 12,469	0–3
4	October 13	Minnesota	W 98–86	Danny Granger (30)	Roy Hibbert (14)	Danny Granger, Roy Hibbert, A. J. Price (4)	Conseco Fieldhouse; 9,177	1–3
5	October 15	New Orleans	W 101–98	Tyler Hansbrough (19)	Josh McRoberts (8)	Darren Collison (5)	Conseco Fieldhouse; 10,758	2–3
6	October 19	@ Minnesota	W 128–124 (OT)	Roy Hibbert (27)	Roy Hibbert (16)	Darren Collison (9)	Target Center; 10,918	3–3
7	October 22	@ Chicago	L 74–102	Roy Hibbert, Darren Collison (14)	Paul George (10)	Darren Collison, Paul George, Jeff Foster (4)	United Center; 21,126	3–4

2010–11 season schedule

== Regular season ==
=== Standings ===
Central Division	W	L	PCT	GB	Home	Road	Div
z-Chicago Bulls	62	20	.756	–	36–5	26–15	15–1
x-Indiana Pacers	37	45	.451	25	24–17	13–28	9–7
Milwaukee Bucks	35	47	.427	27	22–19	13–28	6–10
Detroit Pistons	30	52	.366	32	21–20	9–32	7–9
Cleveland Cavaliers	19	63	.232	43	12–29	7–34	3–13

#	Eastern Conference				
#	Team	W	L	PCT	GB
1	z-Chicago Bulls	62	20	.756	–
2	y-Miami Heat	58	24	.707	4
3	y-Boston Celtics	56	26	.683	6
4	x-Orlando Magic	52	30	.634	10
5	x-Atlanta Hawks	44	38	.537	18
6	x-New York Knicks	42	40	.512	20
7	x-Philadelphia 76ers	41	41	.500	21
8	x-Indiana Pacers	37	45	.451	25
9	Milwaukee Bucks	35	47	.427	27
10	Charlotte Bobcats	34	48	.415	28
11	Detroit Pistons	30	52	.366	32
12	New Jersey Nets	24	58	.293	38
13	Washington Wizards	23	59	.280	39
14	Toronto Raptors	22	60	.268	40
15	Cleveland Cavaliers	19	63	.232	43

=== Game log ===
2010–11 game log
Total: 37–45 (home: 24–17; road: 13–28)
October: 2–1 (home: 1–0; road: 1–1)

Game	Date	Team	Score	High points	High rebounds	High assists	Location Attendance	Record
1	October 27	@ San Antonio	L 109–122	Roy Hibbert (28)	Roy Hibbert (9)	Darren Collison (7)	AT&T Center; 18,581	0–1
2	October 29	@ Charlotte	W 104–101	Danny Granger (33)	Roy Hibbert (8)	Darren Collison, Roy Hibbert (6)	Time Warner Cable Arena; 18,351	1–1
3	October 30	Philadelphia	W 99–86	Danny Granger (22)	Roy Hibbert (13)	Roy Hibbert (5)	Conseco Fieldhouse; 18,165	2–1

November: 7–6 (home: 3–5; road: 4–1)

Game	Date	Team	Score	High points	High rebounds	High assists	Location Attendance	Record
4	November 3	@ Philadelphia	L 75–101	Darren Collison (11)	Roy Hibbert (8)	Danny Granger, Roy Hibbert, Darren Collison (3)	Wells Fargo Center; 12,277	2–2
5	November 5	Milwaukee	L 90–94	Danny Granger, Darren Collison (19)	Roy Hibbert (12)	Roy Hibbert (4)	Conseco Fieldhouse; 14,115	2–3
6	November 9	Denver	W 144–113	Mike Dunleavy Jr. (31)	Josh McRoberts (10)	Darren Collison, T. J. Ford (6)	Conseco Fieldhouse; 11,122	3–3
7	November 12	Houston	L 99–102	James Posey (19)	Roy Hibbert, Josh McRoberts (8)	Mike Dunleavy Jr. (6)	Conseco Fieldhouse; 14,414	3–4
8	November 13	@ Cleveland	W 99–85	Danny Granger (34)	Roy Hibbert (13)	Darren Collison, T. J. Ford (5)	Quicken Loans Arena; 20,562	4–4
9	November 16	Atlanta	L 92–102	Danny Granger (22)	Roy Hibbert (15)	T. J. Ford (5)	Conseco Fieldhouse; 11,133	4–5
10	November 18	L.A. Clippers	W 107–80	Danny Granger (22)	Tyler Hansbrough, Roy Hibbert (8)	A. J. Price (6)	Conseco Fieldhouse; 12,459	5–5
11	November 20	Orlando	L 86–90	Roy Hibbert (19)	Roy Hibbert (10)	T. J. Ford (5)	Conseco Fieldhouse; 14,583	5–6
12	November 22	@ Miami	W 93–77	Danny Granger, Brandon Rush (20)	Danny Granger (11)	Danny Granger (6)	American Airlines Arena; 19,600	6–6
13	November 23	Cleveland	W 100–89	Danny Granger (24)	Roy Hibbert, Josh McRoberts (7)	Darren Collison (7)	Conseco Fieldhouse; 12,629	7–6
14	November 26	Oklahoma City	L 106–110 (OT)	Danny Granger (30)	Mike Dunleavy Jr., Roy Hibbert (10)	Darren Collison (5)	Conseco Fieldhouse; 17,155	7–7
15	November 28	@ L.A. Lakers	W 95–92	Roy Hibbert (24)	Roy Hibbert (12)	Roy Hibbert (6)	Staples Center; 18,997	8–7
16	November 30	@ Sacramento	W 107–98	Danny Granger (37)	Roy Hibbert (8)	Darren Collison (6)	ARCO Arena; 10,927	9–7

December: 5–10 (home: 5–3; road: 0–7)

Game	Date	Team	Score	High points	High rebounds	High assists	Location Attendance	Record
17	December 1	@ Utah	L 88–110	Darren Collison (16)	Danny Granger (7)	Darren Collison, Josh McRoberts (5)	EnergySolutions Arena; 18,732	9–8
18	December 3	@ Phoenix	L 97–105	Brandon Rush (21)	Josh McRoberts (9)	T. J. Ford (9)	US Airways Center; 16,991	9–9
19	December 6	Toronto	W 124–100	Brandon Rush (26)	Danny Granger (9)	T. J. Ford, Roy Hibbert, Josh McRoberts (6)	Conseco Fieldhouse; 11,930	10–9
20	December 8	@ Milwaukee	L 95–97	Danny Granger (26)	Josh McRoberts (7)	Josh McRoberts (5)	Bradley Center; 12,789	10–10
21	December 10	Charlotte	W 100–92	Danny Granger (18)	Roy Hibbert (14)	Darren Collison (7)	Conseco Fieldhouse; 13,128	11–10
22	December 11	@ Atlanta	L 83–97	Mike Dunleavy Jr. (16)	Mike Dunleavy Jr. (9)	Darren Collison (5)	Philips Arena; 14,131	11–11
23	December 13	@ Chicago	L 73–92	T. J. Ford, Brandon Rush (13)	Mike Dunleavy Jr. (8)	T. J. Ford (4)	United Center; 21,287	11–12
24	December 15	L.A. Lakers	L 94–109	Darren Collison (17)	James Posey (7)	Darren Collison, T. J. Ford (6)	Conseco Fieldhouse; 18,165	11–13
25	December 17	Cleveland	W 108–99	Danny Granger (30)	Danny Granger (12)	Darren Collison (5)	Conseco Fieldhouse; 12,021	12–13
26	December 19	@ Boston	L 88–99	Danny Granger (19)	Roy Hibbert (14)	T. J. Ford, James Posey (3)	TD Garden; 18,624	12–14
27	December 20	New Orleans	W 94–93	Danny Granger (27)	Jeff Foster (11)	Darren Collison, T. J. Ford (5)	Conseco Fieldhouse; 12,271	13–14
28	December 26	Memphis	L 90–104	Danny Granger (29)	Roy Hibbert (10)	Darren Collison, T. J. Ford (4)	Conseco Fieldhouse; 12,630	13–15
29	December 28	Boston	L 83–95	Brandon Rush (17)	Roy Hibbert (8)	Danny Granger (4)	Conseco Fieldhouse; 18,165	13–16
30	December 29	@ Washington	L 90–104	Mike Dunleavy Jr. (20)	Danny Granger (9)	Darren Collison (5)	Verizon Center; 16,108	13–17
31	December 31	Washington	W 95–86	Darren Collison, Danny Granger (18)	Roy Hibbert, Josh McRoberts (8)	Darren Collison (6)	Conseco Fieldhouse; 13,043	14–17

January: 4–10 (home: 3–3; road: 1–7)

Game	Date	Team	Score	High points	High rebounds	High assists	Location Attendance	Record
32	January 2	@ New York	L 92–98	Danny Granger (25)	Danny Granger (17)	Darren Collison (6)	Madison Square Garden; 19,763	14–18
33	January 7	San Antonio	L 87–90	Tyler Hansbrough (23)	Roy Hibbert (14)	Darren Collison (6)	Conseco Fieldhouse; 14,157	14–19
34	January 8	@ Atlanta	L 93–108	Danny Granger (16)	Mike Dunleavy Jr., Roy Hibbert (7)	T. J. Ford (6)	Philips Arena; 13,547	14–20
35	January 11	@ Philadelphia	W 111–103	Danny Granger (27)	Tyler Hansbrough (9)	Darren Collison (13)	Wells Fargo Center; 10,890	15–20
36	January 12	Dallas	W 102–89	Brandon Rush (20)	Mike Dunleavy Jr. (11)	Danny Granger (6)	Conseco Fieldhouse; 11,204	16–20
37	January 14	Chicago	L 86–99	Danny Granger (22)	Jeff Foster (15)	Darren Collison (5)	Conseco Fieldhouse; 18,165	16–21
38	January 17	@ L.A. Clippers	L 107–114	Danny Granger (32)	Jeff Foster (8)	Darren Collison (8)	Staples Center; 15,863	16–22
39	January 19	@ Golden State	L 108–110	Danny Granger (32)	Jeff Foster (15)	Danny Granger (6)	Oracle Arena; 18,185	16–23
40	January 22	@ Portland	L 92–97	Danny Granger (24)	Roy Hibbert (10)	Darren Collison (7)	Rose Garden; 20,563	16–24
41	January 23	@ Denver	L 107–121	Tyler Hansbrough (27)	Tyler Hansbrough (10)	A. J. Price (8)	Pepsi Center; 17,047	16–25
42	January 26	Orlando	L 96–111	Danny Granger (27)	Jeff Foster (8)	Darren Collison (4)	Conseco Fieldhouse; 12,164	16–26
43	January 28	New Jersey	W 124–92	Mike Dunleavy Jr. (30)	Jeff Foster, Roy Hibbert (6)	Darren Collison (8)	Conseco Fieldhouse; 11,337	17–26
44	January 29	@ Chicago	L 89–110	Josh McRoberts (20)	Jeff Foster (10)	Darren Collison (8)	United Center; 21,611	17–27
45	January 31	Toronto	W 104–93	Roy Hibbert (24)	Roy Hibbert (11)	Darren Collison (6)	Conseco Fieldhouse; 10,258	18–27

February: 8–5 (home: 4–3; road: 4–2)

Game	Date	Team	Score	High points	High rebounds	High assists	Location Attendance	Record
46	February 2	@ Cleveland	W 117–112	Danny Granger (23)	Roy Hibbert (10)	Darren Collison (9)	Quicken Loans Arena; 18,877	19–27
47	February 4	Portland	W 100–87	Danny Granger (25)	Jeff Foster (13)	Darren Collison (7)	Conseco Fieldhouse; 11,778	20–27
48	February 6	@ New Jersey	W 105–86	Dahntay Jones (18)	Jeff Foster (8)	Danny Granger, Roy Hibbert, Darren Collison (4)	Prudential Center; 13,167	21–27
49	February 8	@ Miami	L 112–117	Roy Hibbert (20)	Roy Hibbert (10)	Darren Collison (8)	American Airlines Arena; 19,600	21–28
50	February 9	Charlotte	W 104–103	Roy Hibbert (29)	Roy Hibbert (10)	Josh McRoberts (7)	Conseco Fieldhouse; 10,268	22–28
51	February 11	Minnesota	W 116–105	Danny Granger, Dahntay Jones (19)	A. J. Price (8)	Darren Collison (6)	Conseco Fieldhouse; 12,559	23–28
52	February 12	@ Milwaukee	W 103–97	Danny Granger (30)	Roy Hibbert (8)	Roy Hibbert (6)	Bradley Center; 17,046	24–28
53	February 15	Miami	L 103–110	Roy Hibbert (18)	Danny Granger (9)	Darren Collison, A. J. Price (5)	Conseco Fieldhouse; 18,165	24–29
54	February 16	@ Detroit	L 109–115 (OT)	Roy Hibbert (29)	Josh McRoberts (12)	Darren Collison (9)	The Palace of Auburn Hills; 12,551	24–30
All-Star Break
55	February 22	@ Washington	W 113–96	Danny Granger (21)	Danny Granger (10)	Darren Collison (6)	Verizon Center; 14,328	25–30
56	February 23	Detroit	W 102–101	Tyler Hansbrough (21)	Tyler Hansbrough (12)	Darren Collison (6)	Conseco Fieldhouse; 12,214	26–30
57	February 25	Utah	L 84–95	Danny Granger (17)	Danny Granger (9)	Darren Collison (3)	Conseco Fieldhouse; 16,205	26–31
58	February 27	Phoenix	L 108–110 (OT)	Danny Granger (25)	Jeff Foster (12)	Danny Granger (6)	Conseco Fieldhouse; 14,168	26–32

March: 8–10 (home: 5–2; road: 3–8)

Game	Date	Team	Score	High points	High rebounds	High assists	Location Attendance	Record
59	March 1	Golden State	W 109–100	Danny Granger (27)	Roy Hibbert (9)	Roy Hibbert, Josh McRoberts (4)	Conseco Fieldhouse; 9,557	27–32
60	March 2	@ Oklahoma City	L 89–113	Tyler Hansbrough (13)	Roy Hibbert (12)	Josh McRoberts (5)	Oklahoma City Arena; 18,203	27–33
61	March 4	@ Dallas	L 108–116	Danny Granger (22)	Roy Hibbert (8)	Darren Collison, Lance Stephenson (6)	American Airlines Center; 20,385	27–34
62	March 5	@ Houston	L 95–112	Tyler Hansbrough (17)	Jeff Foster, Tyler Hansbrough (10)	Lance Stephenson (5)	Toyota Center; 14,965	27–35
63	March 8	Philadelphia	L 100–110	Tyler Hansbrough (26)	Paul George (10)	Dahntay Jones (4)	Conseco Fieldhouse; 9,466	27–36
64	March 9	@ Minnesota	L 75–101	Tyler Hansbrough (21)	Tyler Hansbrough (10)	Darren Collison, Danny Granger, Roy Hibbert, Dahntay Jones, A. J. Price, Brandon Rush, Lance Stephenson (1)	Target Center; 15,153	27–37
65	March 11	@ Toronto	L 98–108	Danny Granger (25)	Paul George, Danny Granger, Tyler Hansbrough (7)	Darren Collison (7)	Air Canada Centre; 14,726	27–38
66	March 13	@ New York	W 106–93	Tyler Hansbrough (29)	Tyler Hansbrough, Roy Hibbert (8)	Darren Collison (8)	Madison Square Garden; 19,763	28–38
67	March 15	New York	W 119–117	Tyler Hansbrough (30)	Roy Hibbert (12)	Darren Collison (9)	Conseco Fieldhouse; 14,164	29–38
68	March 16	@ Boston	L 80–92	Paul George, Danny Granger (15)	Tyler Hansbrough, Josh McRoberts (11)	Darren Collison (9)	TD Garden; 18,624	29–39
69	March 18	Chicago	W 115–108 (OT)	Tyler Hansbrough (29)	Tyler Hansbrough (12)	Darren Collison (8)	Conseco Fieldhouse; 18,165	30–39
70	March 19	@ Memphis	L 78–99	Darren Collison, Danny Granger (17)	Jeff Foster (9)	Paul George, Danny Granger, Dahntay Jones (2)	FedExForum; 17,013	30–40
71	March 21	@ New Jersey	W 102–98	Roy Hibbert (24)	Tyler Hansbrough (9)	Darren Collison (12)	Prudential Center; 13,792	31–40
72	March 23	@ Charlotte	W 111–88	Danny Granger (33)	Roy Hibbert (14)	Darren Collison, Roy Hibbert (4)	Time Warner Cable Arena; 14,703	32–40
73	March 25	Sacramento	L 93–110	Danny Granger (20)	Paul George, Tyler Hansbrough, Brandon Rush (8)	Darren Collison, Tyler Hansbrough, A. J. Price (3)	Conseco Fieldhouse; 13,813	32–41
74	March 26	@ Detroit	L 88–100	Brandon Rush (19)	Tyler Hansbrough, Josh McRoberts (8)	Darren Collison (6)	The Palace of Auburn Hills; 19,216	32–42
75	March 28	Boston	W 107–100	Roy Hibbert (26)	Jeff Foster (7)	Danny Granger (4)	Conseco Fieldhouse; 15,932	33–42
76	March 30	Detroit	W 111–101	Darren Collison (20)	Josh McRoberts (13)	Darren Collison, A. J. Price (3)	Conseco Fieldhouse; 9,390	34–42

April: 3–3 (home: 3–1; road: 0–2)

Game	Date	Team	Score	High points	High rebounds	High assists	Location Attendance	Record
77	April 1	Milwaukee	W 89–88	Danny Granger (17)	Roy Hibbert (11)	Darren Collison (7)	Conseco Fieldhouse; 11,177	35–42
78	April 3	@ New Orleans	L 96–108	Mike Dunleavy Jr., Danny Granger (15)	Roy Hibbert (6)	A. J. Price (6)	New Orleans Arena; 13,898	35–43
79	April 6	Washington	W 136–112	Danny Granger (25)	Paul George, Roy Hibbert (6)	Darren Collison (11)	Conseco Fieldhouse; 14,222	36–43
80	April 8	Atlanta	W 114–102	Danny Granger (28)	Roy Hibbert (11)	Darren Collison (10)	Conseco Fieldhouse; 15,879	37–43
81	April 10	New York	L 109–110	Danny Granger (20)	Roy Hibbert (10)	Darren Collison (5)	Conseco Fieldhouse; 13,542	37–44
82	April 13	@ Orlando	L 74–92	Mike Dunleavy Jr., Brandon Rush (16)	Tyler Hansbrough, Solomon Jones (6)	A. J. Price (7)	Amway Center; 19,169	37–45

2010–11 season schedule

== Playoffs ==
=== Game log ===
2011 playoff game log
First Round: 1–4 (home: 1–1; road: 0–3)

Game	Date	Team	Score	High points	High rebounds	High assists	Location Attendance	Series
1	April 16	@ Chicago	L 99–104	Danny Granger (24)	Roy Hibbert (8)	Darren Collison (9)	United Center; 22,986	0–1
2	April 18	@ Chicago	L 90–96	Danny Granger (19)	Tyler Hansbrough, Josh McRoberts (6)	Mike Dunleavy Jr., Danny Granger (4)	United Center; 22,480	0–2
3	April 21	Chicago	L 84–88	Danny Granger (21)	Paul George (12)	Darren Collison, Mike Dunleavy Jr., Paul George, Danny Granger (2)	Conseco Fieldhouse; 18,165	0–3
4	April 23	Chicago	W 89–84	Danny Granger (24)	Danny Granger, Roy Hibbert (10)	Danny Granger (4)	Conseco Fieldhouse; 18,165	1–3
5	April 26	@ Chicago	L 89–116	Danny Granger (20)	Tyler Hansbrough (11)	Darren Collison (5)	United Center; 22,822	1–4

2011 playoff schedule

== Player statistics ==
=== Regular season ===
Player	POS	GP	GS	MP	REB	AST	STL	BLK	PTS	MPG	RPG	APG	SPG	BPG	PPG
Roy Hibbert	C	81	80	2,244	610	166	33	142	1,025	27.7	7.5	2.0	.4	1.8	12.7
Danny Granger	SF	79	79	2,763	425	203	89	62	1,622	35.0	5.4	2.6	1.1	.8	20.5
Darren Collison	PG	79	79	2,360	225	403	87	14	1,039	29.9	2.8	5.1	1.1	.2	13.2
Josh McRoberts	PF	72	51	1,597	382	150	47	57	533	22.2	5.3	2.1	.7	.8	7.4
Tyler Hansbrough	PF	70	29	1,535	366	41	37	15	767	21.9	5.2	.6	.5	.2	11.0
Brandon Rush	SG	67	21	1,754	217	62	41	35	607	26.2	3.2	.9	.6	.5	9.1
Mike Dunleavy Jr.	SG	61	44	1,683	276	105	40	30	682	27.6	4.5	1.7	.7	.5	11.2
Paul George	SG	61	19	1,265	224	65	62	26	476	20.7	3.7	1.1	1.0	.4	7.8
Jeff Foster	C	56	3	940	350	46	24	31	187	16.8	6.3	.8	.4	.6	3.3
A. J. Price	PG	50	0	795	72	111	29	1	323	15.9	1.4	2.2	.6	.0	6.5
James Posey	SF	49	0	839	147	34	24	6	240	17.1	3.0	.7	.5	.1	4.9
Dahntay Jones	SG	45	2	589	65	33	20	7	283	13.1	1.4	.7	.4	.2	6.3
T. J. Ford	PG	41	3	773	81	141	35	8	223	18.9	2.0	3.4	.9	.2	5.4
Solomon Jones	C	39	0	528	113	30	12	22	139	13.5	2.9	.8	.3	.6	3.6
Lance Stephenson	SG	12	0	115	18	21	4	0	37	9.6	1.5	1.8	.3	.0	3.1

=== Playoffs ===
Player	POS	GP	GS	MP	REB	AST	STL	BLK	PTS	MPG	RPG	APG	SPG	BPG	PPG
Danny Granger	SF	5	5	183	28	16	6	1	108	36.6	5.6	3.2	1.2	.2	21.6
Tyler Hansbrough	PF	5	5	164	27	5	6	0	56	32.8	5.4	1.0	1.2	.0	11.2
Darren Collison	PG	5	5	146	13	20	5	2	47	29.2	2.6	4.0	1.0	.4	9.4
Paul George	SG	5	5	133	25	5	7	10	30	26.6	5.0	1.0	1.4	2.0	6.0
Roy Hibbert	C	5	5	132	34	3	2	9	52	26.4	6.8	.6	.4	1.8	10.4
Jeff Foster	C	5	0	93	24	4	2	4	17	18.6	4.8	.8	.4	.8	3.4
A. J. Price	PG	5	0	80	7	6	3	0	42	16.0	1.4	1.2	.6	.0	8.4
Josh McRoberts	PF	5	0	79	18	6	4	1	25	15.8	3.6	1.2	.8	.2	5.0
Mike Dunleavy Jr.	SG	5	0	72	6	8	4	0	25	14.4	1.2	1.6	.8	.0	5.0
Brandon Rush	SG	5	0	55	7	3	1	1	16	11.0	1.4	.6	.2	.2	3.2
Dahntay Jones	SG	3	0	50	2	2	1	0	26	16.7	.7	.7	.3	.0	8.7
T. J. Ford	PG	2	0	14	1	2	0	0	7	7.0	.5	1.0	.0	.0	3.5

== Transactions ==
=== Trades ===
June 24, 2010
To Indiana Pacers----
- No. 51 pick (Magnum Rolle)
To Oklahoma City Thunder----
- No. 57 pick (Ryan Reid),
  cash considerations

=== Free agents ===
==== Additions ====
Player	Former Team
Darren Collison	New Orleans Hornets
James Posey	New Orleans Hornets

==== Subtractions ====
Player	Current Team
Luther Head	Sacramento Kings
Troy Murphy	New Jersey Nets
Earl Watson	Utah Jazz
