= Lou Amundson =

American basketball player (born 1982)

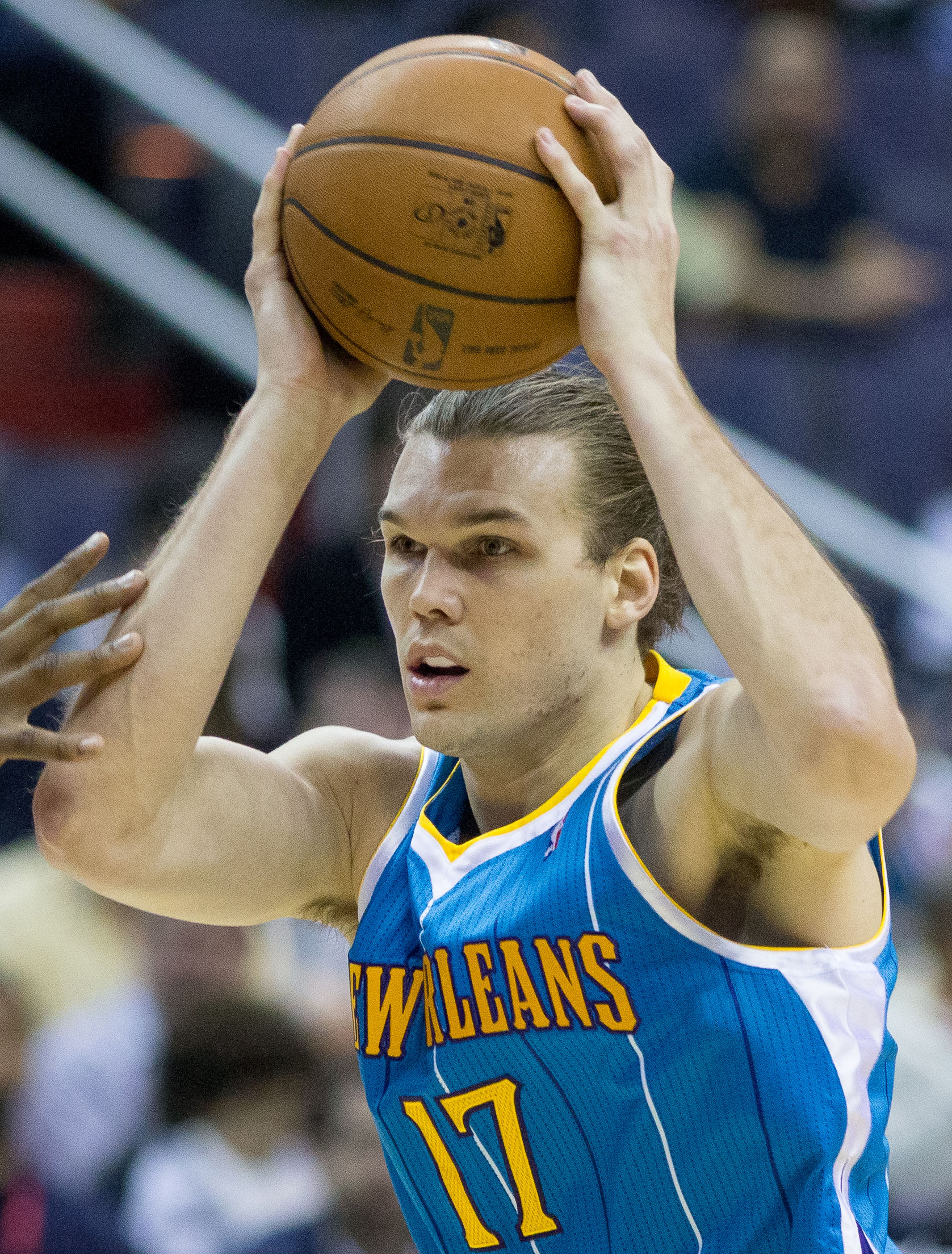
- Amundson in 2013

Personal information
- Born: December 7, 1982 (age 43) Ventura, California, U.S.
- Listed height: 6 ft 9 in (2.06 m)
- Listed weight: 220 lb (100 kg)

Career information
- High school: Monarch (Louisville, Colorado)
- College: UNLV (2001–2006)
- NBA draft: 2006: undrafted
- Playing career: 2006–2018
- Position: Power forward / center
- Number: 10, 22, 20, 17, 19, 89, 21, 8

Career history
- 2006–2007: Colorado 14ers
- 2007: Utah Jazz
- 2007–2008: Philadelphia 76ers
- 2008–2010: Phoenix Suns
- 2010–2011: Golden State Warriors
- 2011–2012: Indiana Pacers
- 2012–2013: Minnesota Timberwolves
- 2013: Chicago Bulls
- 2013: New Orleans Hornets / Pelicans
- 2014: Chicago Bulls
- 2014–2015: Cleveland Cavaliers
- 2015–2016: New York Knicks
- 2017: TNT KaTropa
- 2017–2018: Kawasaki Brave Thunders

Career highlights
- All-NBA D-League First Team (2007); NBA D-League Rookie of the Year (2007); Second-team All-Mountain West (2006)
- Stats at NBA.com
- Stats at Basketball Reference

Louis Gabriel Amundson (/ˈɑːməndsən/ born December 7, 1982) is an American former professional basketball player. He played college basketball for the UNLV Runnin' Rebels and professionally for 12 years, including 10 seasons in the National Basketball Association (NBA).

== Early life and college ==
Amundson was born in Ventura, California, and grew up in Boulder, Colorado.

He played college basketball at the University of Nevada, Las Vegas, from 2001 to 2002 and then from 2003 to 2006, missing the 2002–03 season as a medical redshirt due to a thumb infection.

== Professional career ==
=== Colorado 14ers (2006–2007) ===
Amundson played in the NBA D-League for the Colorado 14ers and was named the NBA D-League Rookie of the Year in 2007.

=== Utah Jazz (2007) ===
On February 5, 2007, Amundson signed a 10-day contract with the Utah Jazz. He signed a second 10-day contract on February 19.

=== Philadelphia 76ers (2007–2008) ===
On March 8, 2007, Amundson signed a 10-day contract with the Philadelphia 76ers. He signed a second 10-day contract on March 18, and signed for the remainder of the season on March 28.

=== Phoenix Suns (2008–2010) ===
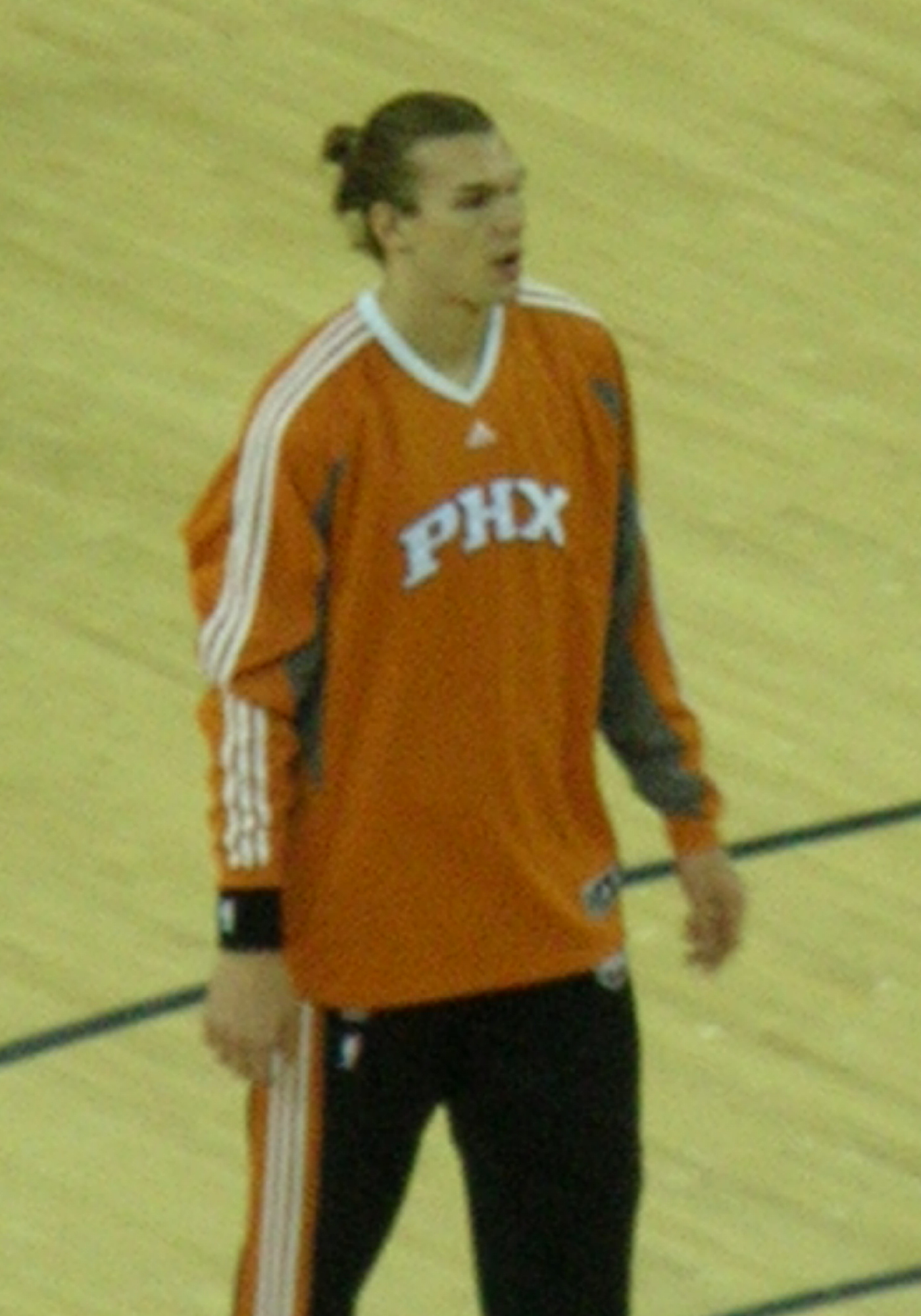
Amundson with the Suns in 2009

On August 14, 2008, Amundson signed a two-year contract with the Phoenix Suns. On June 30, 2009, Suns exercised the team option on Amundson's contract.

=== Golden State Warriors (2010–2011) ===
On September 13, 2010, Amundson signed a two-year $4.17 million contract with the Golden State Warriors, with the second year being a player option. During 46 games, he averaged 4.3 points and 4 rebounds in 15 minutes of play. After the 2010–2011 season, he exercised his option to stay with the Warriors for one more year.

On October 16, 2010, in a game against the Trail Blazers in Portland, Amundson dislocated the middle knuckle on his right index finger and had a fracture at its base that required surgery.

On October 18, 2010, Amundson underwent successful surgery to repair this fractured right index finger. The procedure was performed by Dr. Andrew Gutow, a hand specialist from the Palo Alto Medical Foundation, at the Menlo Park Surgical Hospital.

=== Indiana Pacers (2011–2012) ===
On December 19, 2011, Amundson was traded to the Indiana Pacers for Brandon Rush.

On March 13, 2012, Amundson helped avenge his broken finger from the prior season when he was with Golden State and scored a career-high 21 points to help Indiana beat the Portland Trail Blazers 92–75.

=== Minnesota Timberwolves (2012–2013) ===
He signed with the Minnesota Timberwolves on September 25, 2012. He was waived by the Timberwolves on February 8, 2013.

=== Chicago Bulls (2013) ===
On March 2, 2013, the Chicago Bulls signed Amundson to a 10-day contract.

=== New Orleans Hornets / Pelicans (2013) ===
On March 12, 2013, Amundson signed with the New Orleans Hornets for the rest of the 2012–13 NBA season.

On September 30, 2013, Amundson signed with the Los Angeles Clippers. On October 26, 2013, he was waived by the Clippers.

On November 12, 2013, Amundson signed with the New Orleans Pelicans for the rest of the 2013–14 NBA season. On December 31, 2013, he was waived by the Pelicans.

=== Return to Chicago (2014) ===
On April 10, 2014, Amundson signed with the Chicago Bulls for the rest of the 2013–14 season. On July 15, 2014, he was waived by the Bulls.

=== Cleveland Cavaliers (2014–2015) ===
On September 26, 2014, Amundson signed with the Cleveland Cavaliers.

=== New York Knicks (2015–2016) ===
On January 5, 2015, Amundson was traded to the New York Knicks in a three-team trade that also involved the Cavaliers and the Oklahoma City Thunder. The Knicks received Amundson, Alex Kirk, and a second round pick in the 2019 NBA draft, while Cleveland received Iman Shumpert and J. R. Smith from the Knicks and a first round pick in the 2015 NBA draft from the Thunder, while Cleveland sent Dion Waiters to Oklahoma City, and the Thunder send Lance Thomas to the Knicks. After being waived by the Knicks on January 7, he signed a 10-day contract with the team three days later. With his Knicks debut on January 15, he became just the twelfth player to play for at least ten NBA teams. On January 20, he signed a second 10-day contract with the Knicks. On January 30, he signed with the Knicks for the rest of the season.

On July 30, 2015, Amundson re-signed with the Knicks. He re-signed with the Knicks for a second time on September 19, 2016, but was later waived on October 21, 2016.

=== TNT KaTropa (2017) ===
On March 23, 2017, Amundson signed with TNT KaTropa of the Philippine Basketball Association as an import for the 2017 PBA Commissioner's Cup. He appeared in two games for TNT KaTropa before parting with the team on March 27.

=== Kawasaki Brave Thunders (2017–2018) ===
On December 28, 2017, Amundson signed with the Kawasaki Brave Thunders of the B.League.

Amundson has played in The Basketball Tournament (TBT), a $2 million winner-take-all summer tournament broadcast on the ESPN family of channels. In TBT 2017, he played for The Stickmen, scoring 27 points in one game played. Amundson helped take The Stickmen to the second round of the tournament, where they lost to Team Challenge ALS, 87–73. In TBT 2018, he returned to the team, then named Eberlein Drive. Eberlein Drive made it to the championship game, where they lost to Overseas Elite.

== Personal life ==
Amundson has Swedish heritage on his father's side, and also lived in Stockholm for a time. He expressed a desire to play for the Swedish national team, but that failed when the Swedish immigration ministry rejected his application for citizenship.

== NBA career statistics ==
Legend
GP	Games played	GS	Games started	MPG	Minutes per game
FG%	Field goal percentage	3P%	3-point field goal percentage	FT%	Free throw percentage
RPG	Rebounds per game	APG	Assists per game	SPG	Steals per game
BPG	Blocks per game	PPG	Points per game	**Bold**	Career high

=== Regular season ===
Year	Team	GP	GS	MPG	FG%	3P%	FT%	RPG	APG	SPG	BPG	PPG
2006–07	Utah	1	0	2.0	.000	.000	.000	.0	.0	.0	.0	.0
2006–07	Philadelphia	10	0	8.7	.400	.000	.400	2.8	.1	.1	.8	1.6
2007–08	Philadelphia	16	0	4.0	.500	.000	.286	.8	.0	.1	.1	1.1
2008–09	Phoenix	76	0	13.7	.536	.000	.442	3.6	.4	.4	.9	4.2
2009–10	Phoenix	**79**	0	14.8	**.551**	.000	.545	4.4	.4	.3	.9	4.7
2010–11	Golden State	46	7	15.0	.454	.000	.391	4.0	.4	.3	.7	4.3
2011–12	Indiana	60	0	12.6	.430	.000	.427	3.7	.2	**.5**	.7	3.6
2012–13	Minnesota	20	0	8.1	.368	.000	.200	2.4	.2	.4	.3	1.6
2012–13	Chicago	1	0	2.0	.000	.000	.000	1.0	.0	.0	.0	.0
2012–13	New Orleans	18	0	11.6	.429	.000	.500	3.2	.4	**.5**	.3	2.4
2013–14	New Orleans	18	0	10.2	.500	.000	.250	3.1	.3	**.5**	.6	2.1
2013–14	Chicago	1	0	1.0	.000	.000	.000	.0	.0	.0	.0	.0
2014–15	Cleveland	12	0	6.6	.333	.000	**.600**	1.7	.4	.1	.0	.9
2014–15	New York	41	**35**	**20.9**	.432	.000	.463	**6.0**	**1.6**	**.5**	**1.3**	**6.0**
2015–16	New York	29	0	7.0	.358	.000	.519	1.7	.4	.2	.2	1.8
Career		428	42	12.9	.474	.000	.444	3.6	.4	.4	.7	3.7

=== Playoffs ===
Year	Team	GP	GS	MPG	FG%	3P%	FT%	RPG	APG	SPG	BPG	PPG
2008	Philadelphia	2	0	5.0	.500	.000	**.500**	**3.5**	.0	.0	.0	2.5
2010	Phoenix	**16**	0	**12.1**	**.528**	.000	.429	**3.5**	.1	**.4**	.4	**2.9**
2012	Indiana	11	0	8.5	.522	.000	**.500**	2.1	**.2**	.2	**.5**	2.5
Career		29	0	10.3	.524	.000	.448	3.0	.1	.3	.4	2.7
