= Jeff Foster (basketball) =

American basketball player (born 1977)

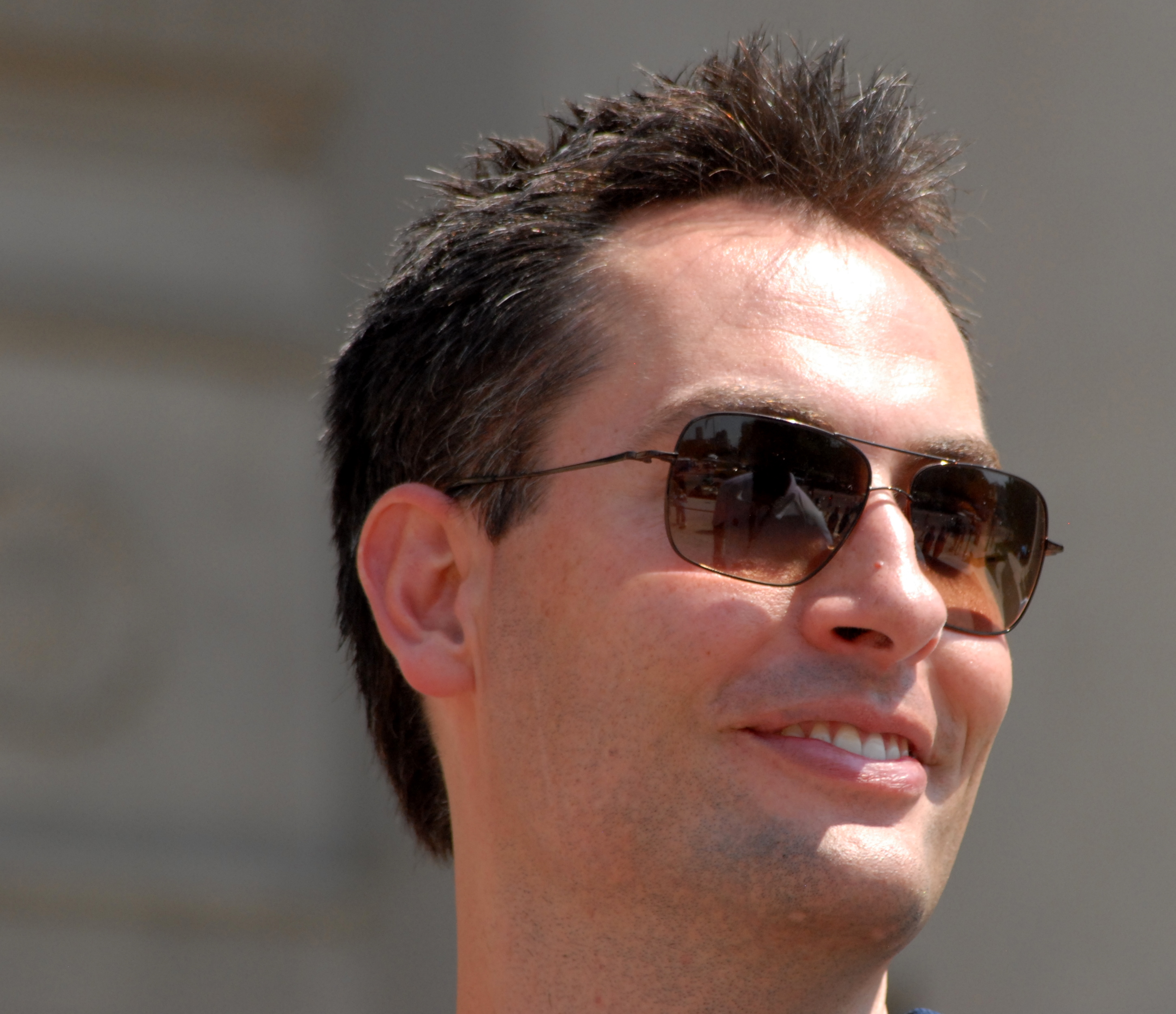
- Foster in 2010

Personal information
- Born: January 16, 1977 (age 49) San Antonio, Texas, U.S.
- Listed height: 6 ft 11 in (2.11 m)
- Listed weight: 250 lb (113 kg)

Career information
- High school: James Madison (San Antonio, Texas)
- College: Texas State (1995–1999)
- NBA draft: 1999: 1st round, 21st overall pick
- Drafted by: Golden State Warriors
- Playing career: 1999–2012
- Position: Center / power forward
- Number: 10

Career history
- 1999–2012: Indiana Pacers

Career statistics
- Points: 3,747 (4.9 ppg)
- Rebounds: 5,248 (6.9 rpg)
- Assists: 703 (0.9 apg)
- Stats at NBA.com
- Stats at Basketball Reference

Jeffrey Douglas Foster (born January 16, 1977) is an American former professional basketball player who spent the entirety of his 13-year career with the Indiana Pacers of the National Basketball Association (NBA).

== Early life and college ==
Foster was born in San Antonio, Texas and graduated from James Madison High School in San Antonio in 1995. In senior year, he joined the varsity basketball team in high school. He attended Southwest Texas State University and finished college nine credits short of a degree in finance. With the Southwest Texas State Bobcats, Foster averaged 12.8 points and 10.2 rebounds in his junior season and was part of the All-Southland Conference Second-Team in 1998.

== NBA career ==
He was selected 21st overall by the Golden State Warriors in the 1999 NBA draft out of Southwest Texas State University, but his draft rights were immediately traded to the Pacers in exchange for Vonteego Cummings and a future first-round draft pick.

Foster was part of the Pacers' 1999–2000 Eastern Conference championship team, though he played only 19 games that year as he was fourth on the Pacers' depth chart at center behind Rik Smits, Sam Perkins and Zan Tabak. In his second season, he played in 71 games, gaining a spot in the rotation as the Pacers rebuilt for the future. He averaged 3.5 points and 5.5 rebounds per game while averaging only 16.2 minutes per contest.

Foster began the 2001–02 season as the starter, and started 48 games that year before Brad Miller was acquired in a trade with the Chicago Bulls. Nevertheless, Foster played in all 82 games for the first time in his career, averaging 5.7 points and 6.8 rebounds per game.

Miller remained the Pacers' starting center throughout the 2002–03 season, and as such Foster was relegated back to the bench, and he produced his lowest point total yet of his career (2.1 ppg) and grabbed only 3.6 rebounds per game.

Before the 2003–04 season, Brad Miller was traded to the Sacramento Kings, and newly acquired Scot Pollard began as the starting center. But Foster distinguished himself in the Pacers' season opener against the Detroit Pistons and his play, combined with Pollard's poor play, meant a return to the starting line-up for Foster. The energetic, hard-working center became an important rebounding presence for the Pacers, and his offensive rebounds, in particular, combined with well-timed tip-ins, finally endeared himself to Indiana fans.

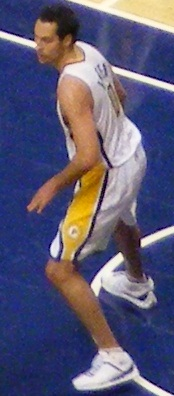
Foster with the Pacers in 2008.

Foster sustained a back injury in December 2009 and underwent surgery on February 16, 2010.

Foster announced his retirement on March 21, 2012. He cited chronic back issues as the reason for his departure from the game. At the time of his retirement, Foster ranked 8th all-time in total rebound rate and 4th all-time in offensive rebound rate.

== NBA career statistics ==
Legend
GP	Games played	GS	Games started	MPG	Minutes per game
FG%	Field goal percentage	3P%	3-point field goal percentage	FT%	Free throw percentage
RPG	Rebounds per game	APG	Assists per game	SPG	Steals per game
BPG	Blocks per game	PPG	Points per game	**Bold**	Career high

=== Regular season ===
Year	Team	GP	GS	MPG	FG%	3P%	FT%	RPG	APG	SPG	BPG	PPG
1999–00	Indiana	19	0	4.5	**.565**	.000	**.680**	1.7	.3	.3	.1	2.3
2000–01	Indiana	71	9	16.2	.469	.286	.516	5.5	.5	.5	.4	3.5
2001–02	Indiana	**82**	48	21.8	.449	.133	.610	6.8	.9	**.9**	.5	5.7
2002–03	Indiana	77	2	10.4	.360	.000	.540	3.6	.7	.4	.3	2.1
2003–04	Indiana	**82**	**79**	23.9	.544	.000	.669	7.4	.8	**.9**	.3	6.1
2004–05	Indiana	61	43	**26.1**	.519	.000	.634	9.0	.7	.8	.2	**7.0**
2005–06	Indiana	63	37	25.1	.552	.000	.604	**9.1**	.8	.7	.4	5.9
2006–07	Indiana	75	43	23.2	.469	.000	.639	8.1	.8	.8	.5	4.3
2007–08	Indiana	77	52	24.5	.550	.000	.593	8.7	1.7	.7	.4	6.4
2008–09	Indiana	74	26	24.7	.501	.286	.658	6.9	**1.8**	.7	**.7**	6.1
2009–10	Indiana	16	3	15.9	.478	.000	.556	5.1	1.3	.2	.3	3.1
2010–11	Indiana	56	3	16.8	.479	.000	.563	6.3	.8	.4	.6	3.3
2011–12	Indiana	11	0	12.8	.500	**1.000**	.667	3.8	.4	.7	.1	2.3
Career		764	345	20.6	.497	.130	.615	6.9	.9	.7	.4	4.9

=== Playoffs ===
Year	Team	GP	GS	MPG	FG%	3P%	FT%	RPG	APG	SPG	BPG	PPG
2001	Indiana	4	2	13.0	.444	.000	**1.000**	3.0	.5	.0	.8	2.5
2002	Indiana	5	0	15.6	.538	**.500**	.444	4.8	**1.4**	.6	.2	4.0
2003	Indiana	6	0	6.3	.545	.000	**1.000**	1.3	.3	.0	.5	2.3
2004	Indiana	**16**	**13**	19.2	.581	.000	.800	6.6	.8	.8	.3	3.6
2005	Indiana	13	0	18.8	**.596**	.000	.714	**7.4**	.4	.5	**.9**	**5.9**
2006	Indiana	4	4	**20.0**	.364	.000	.750	6.0	.8	**1.0**	.3	2.8
2011	Indiana	5	0	18.6	.583	.000	.375	4.8	.8	.4	.8	3.4
Career		53	19	16.8	.556	.400	.661	5.5	.7	.5	.5	3.9

== See also ==
- List of NBA players who have spent their entire career with one franchise
