= A. J. Price =

American basketball player (born 1986)

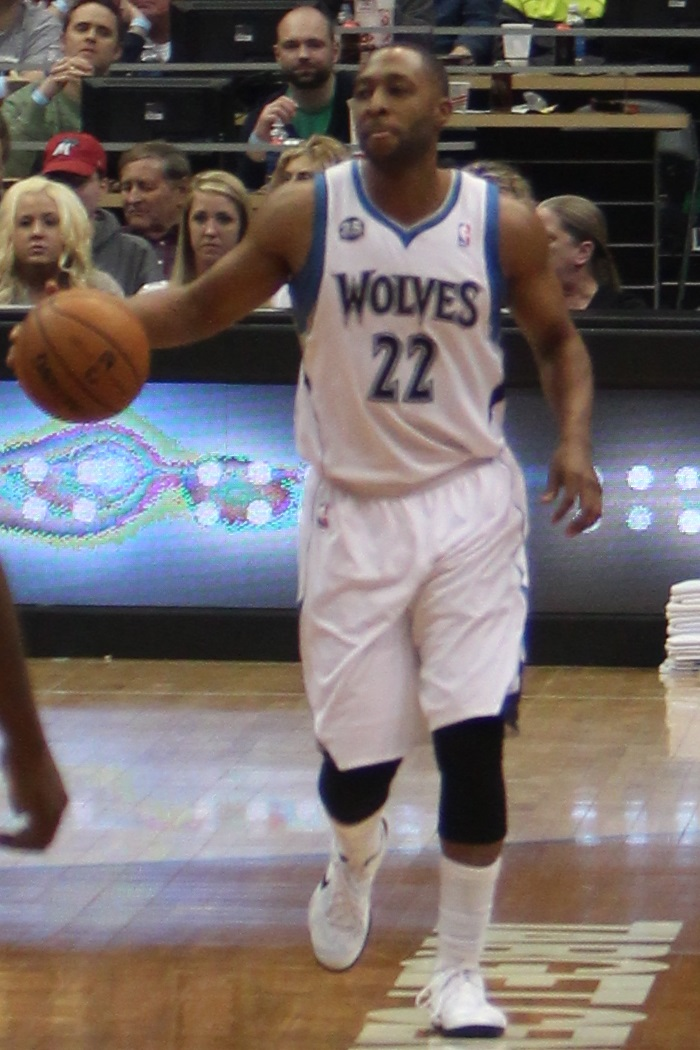
- Price during a Timberwolves vs. Pelicans game on January 1, 2014

Personal information
- Born: October 7, 1986 (age 39) Orange, New Jersey, U.S.
- Listed height: 6 ft 2 in (1.88 m)
- Listed weight: 195 lb (88 kg)

Career information
- High school: Amityville Memorial (Amityville, New York)
- College: UConn (2006–2009)
- NBA draft: 2009: 2nd round, 52nd overall pick
- Drafted by: Indiana Pacers
- Playing career: 2009–2017
- Position: Point guard
- Number: 22, 12, 21, 1

Career history
- 2009–2012: Indiana Pacers
- 2012–2013: Washington Wizards
- 2013–2014: Minnesota Timberwolves
- 2014: Indiana Pacers
- 2014–2015: Cleveland Cavaliers
- 2015: Phoenix Suns
- 2015–2016: Shanghai Sharks
- 2016–2017: Shandong Golden Stars

Career highlights
- Second-team All-American – USBWA (2008); First-team All-Big East (2008); Second-team All-Big East (2009)
- Stats at NBA.com
- Stats at Basketball Reference

Anthony Jordan Price (born October 7, 1986) is an American former professional basketball player. He was born in Orange, New Jersey and raised in East Massapequa, New York. He is the son of former NBA player Tony Price.

== High school career ==
Price attended Amityville Memorial High School, where he led the Warriors to three straight Long Island Championships and state titles in his sophomore and junior seasons. As a junior (2003) he averaged 25.4 points, seven rebounds, five assists and three steals. His numbers continued to increase as a senior; he averaged 28.5 points and eight rebounds. He finished his three-year career with 130 career three-pointers and 1,394 career points. He was a two-time Newsday Suffolk County Player of the Year.

Considered a four-star recruit by Rivals.com, Price was listed as the No. 7 point guard and the No. 32 player in the nation in 2004.

== College career ==
Price chose UConn over Florida State, Kansas and St. John's. He missed his freshman (2004–05) season after a life-threatening battle with AVM, which caused bleeding in his brain. He underwent radio-surgery treatment in February 2005 and spent more than 14 months recovering from his illness. It was not until May 2006 that he received clearance from his doctors to return to the court.

However, Price was suspended by the university for the 2005–06 academic semester due to violations of the University Student Code of Conduct. He was arrested, along with fellow basketball player Marcus Williams in August 2005 on charges of trying to sell stolen laptops. He pleaded not guilty to larceny charges. Price was not permitted to take classes during the Fall 2005 semester, but returned to classes in the Spring 2006 semester.

He returned to the court for the 2006–07 season as a sophomore. He appeared in all 31 games, starting at point guard in 23 contests. For the season he averaged 9.4 points per game with 113 assists and 37 steals to his credit in 23.9 minutes per game. In the 2007–08 season, Price started all 33 games at point guard and was UConn's second leading scorer. He won many awards and was named to the U.S. Basketball Writers Association's All-America Team. He was also a unanimous selection to the First Team All-BIG EAST squad and selected as USBWA District Player of the Year and member of All-District First Team, named a finalist for the John R. Wooden Award, and was chosen as one of ten finalists for the USBWA Player of the Year Award, the Oscar Robertson Trophy and named to the NABC All-District 1 First Team. In the first round of the 2008 NCAA Tournament against San Diego Price played nine minutes before tearing his left anterior cruciate ligament. The team would go on to lose the game by one point in overtime.

The next season 2008–09 was the best season for Price. Coming off the ACL injury he was the Huskies' leading scorer with 14.7 points a game and was critical in their run to the final four. In a game versus Gonzaga he hit a falling down three-pointer to force the game into overtime. In the 2009 NCAA Men's Division I Basketball Tournament he was named the most outstanding player in the West Region, but the Huskies fell in the semi-finals to the Michigan State Spartans. He was a liberal arts major at Connecticut.

=== College statistics ===
Year	Team	GP	GS	MPG	FG%	3P%	FT%	RPG	APG	SPG	BPG	PPG
2006–07	Connecticut Huskies	31	23	24.0	.387	.273	.690	3.0	3.7	1.2	.1	9.4
2007–08	Connecticut Huskies	33	33	32.1	.437	.369	.746	3.5	5.8	1.3	.1	14.5
2008–09	Connecticut Huskies	35	35	31.8	.408	.402	.721	3.5	4.7	.7	.0	14.7
Career		99	91	29.4	.413	.365	.722	3.3	4.7	1.1	.1	13.0

== Professional career ==
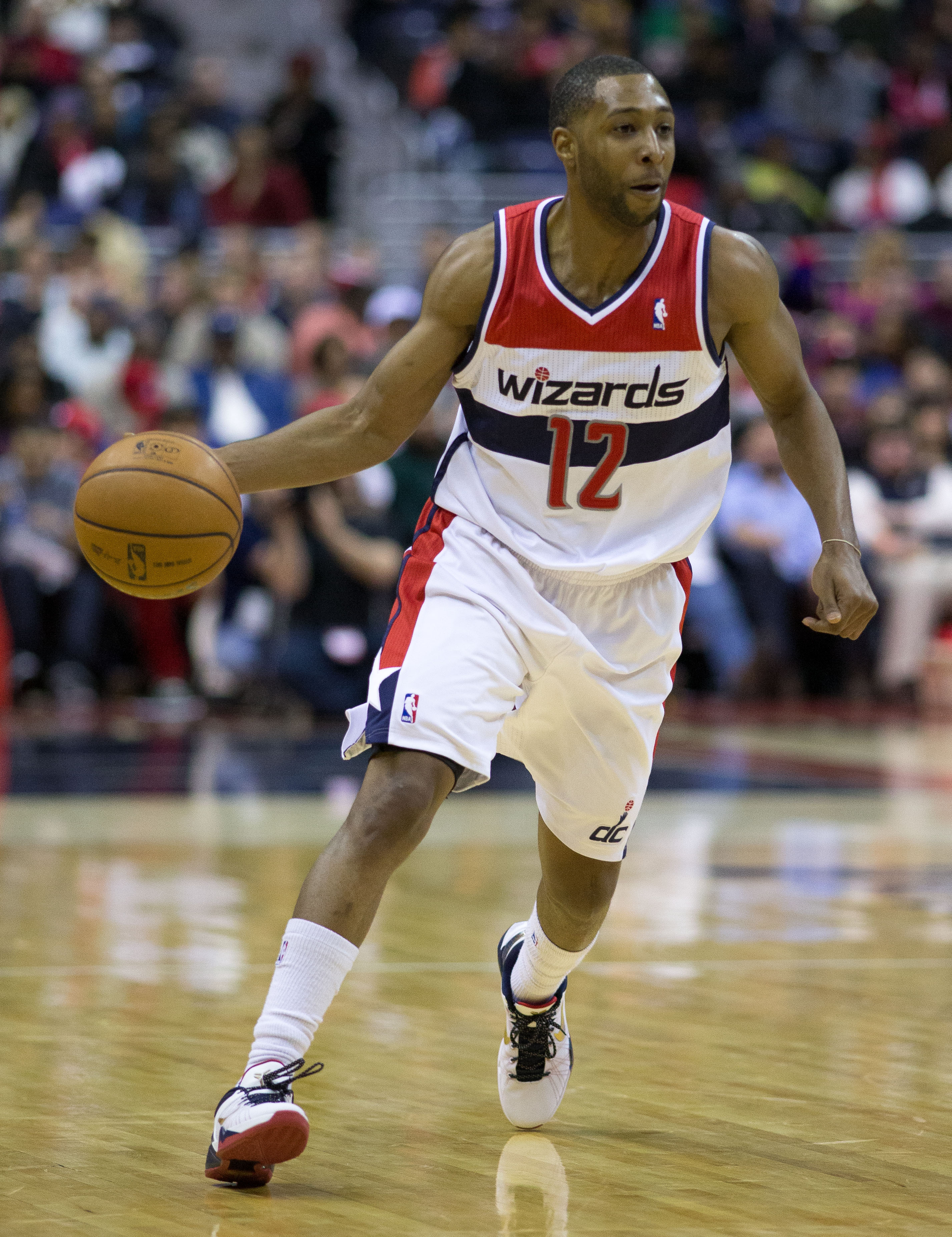
Price with the Wizards

Price was selected in the second round of the 2009 NBA draft at number 52 overall by the Indiana Pacers on June 25, 2009.

Midway through the 2009–10 season, Price, along with Earl Watson, moved ahead of T. J. Ford on the team's depth chart. In December, Watson became the starter and Price became the primary backup point guard.

In the 2011–12 season, Price backed up Darren Collison when George Hill was injured; however, when the Pacers acquired Leandro Barbosa, he received fewer minutes.

On July 24, 2012, Price signed with the Washington Wizards.

On September 30, 2013, Price signed with the Minnesota Timberwolves. On April 3, 2014, he was waived by the Timberwolves.

On September 26, 2014, Price signed with the Cleveland Cavaliers. On November 1, 2014, he was waived by the Cavaliers before playing in a regular season game for them.

On November 6, 2014, Price signed with the Indiana Pacers to help the team deal with numerous injuries. Indiana had to use an NBA hardship exemption in order to sign him as he made their roster stand at 16, one over the allowed limited of 15. On November 28, 2014, he was waived by the Pacers. Two days later, he was claimed off waivers by the Cavaliers. On January 7, 2015, he was waived again by Cavaliers. On March 21, he signed a 10-day contract with the Phoenix Suns and made his debut for the team later that night, recording 2 points, 1 rebound and 1 assist in a 117–102 win over the Houston Rockets. He was not retained by the Suns following the expiration of his 10-day contract on March 31.

In September 2015, Price signed with the Shanghai Sharks of the Chinese Basketball Association. He then spent the 2016–17 season with the Shandong Golden Stars.

== NBA career statistics ==
Legend
GP	Games played	GS	Games started	MPG	Minutes per game
FG%	Field goal percentage	3P%	3-point field goal percentage	FT%	Free throw percentage
RPG	Rebounds per game	APG	Assists per game	SPG	Steals per game
BPG	Blocks per game	PPG	Points per game	**Bold**	Career high

=== Regular season ===
Year	Team	GP	GS	MPG	FG%	3P%	FT%	RPG	APG	SPG	BPG	PPG
2009–10	Indiana	56	2	15.4	.410	.345	**.800**	1.6	1.9	**.6**	**.1**	7.3
2010–11	Indiana	50	0	15.9	.356	.275	.667	1.4	2.2	**.6**	.0	6.5
2011–12	Indiana	44	1	12.9	.339	.295	**.800**	1.4	2.0	.5	.0	3.9
2012–13	Washington	**57**	**22**	**22.4**	.390	.350	.790	**2.0**	**3.6**	**.6**	**.1**	7.7
2013–14	Minnesota	28	0	3.5	.413	.273	.000	.4	.5	.0	.0	1.6
2014–15	Indiana	10	0	19.3	**.438**	**.385**	.667	1.4	2.7	.4	.0	**10.5**
2014–15	Cleveland	11	0	7.9	.265	.000	.667	1.4	1.2	.3	.0	2.0
2014–15	Phoenix	5	0	8.8	.214	.000	.000	.6	1.2	.0	.0	1.2
Career		261	25	15.1	.380	.316	.742	1.4	2.2	.5	.0	5.8

=== Playoffs ===
Year	Team	GP	GS	MPG	FG%	3P%	FT%	RPG	APG	SPG	BPG	PPG
2011	Indiana	**5**	0	**16.0**	.371	**.438**	**.900**	**1.4**	**1.2**	**.6**	.0	**8.4**
2012	Indiana	4	0	1.8	**.500**	.000	.000	.5	.3	.0	.0	.5
Career		9	0	9.6	.378	.438	.900	1.0	.8	.3	.0	4.9

== Personal life ==
Price is the older of two children born to Tony and Inga Price. His younger sister's name is Raven. His father Tony was a standout basketball performer at the University of Pennsylvania, helping the team advance to the 1979 NCAA Men's Division I Basketball Tournament and eventually into the Final Four. Tony was the top scorer of the tournament with 142 points and earned a spot on the 1979 East Regional All-Tournament Team.
