= Dahntay Jones =

American basketball coach and player (born 1980)

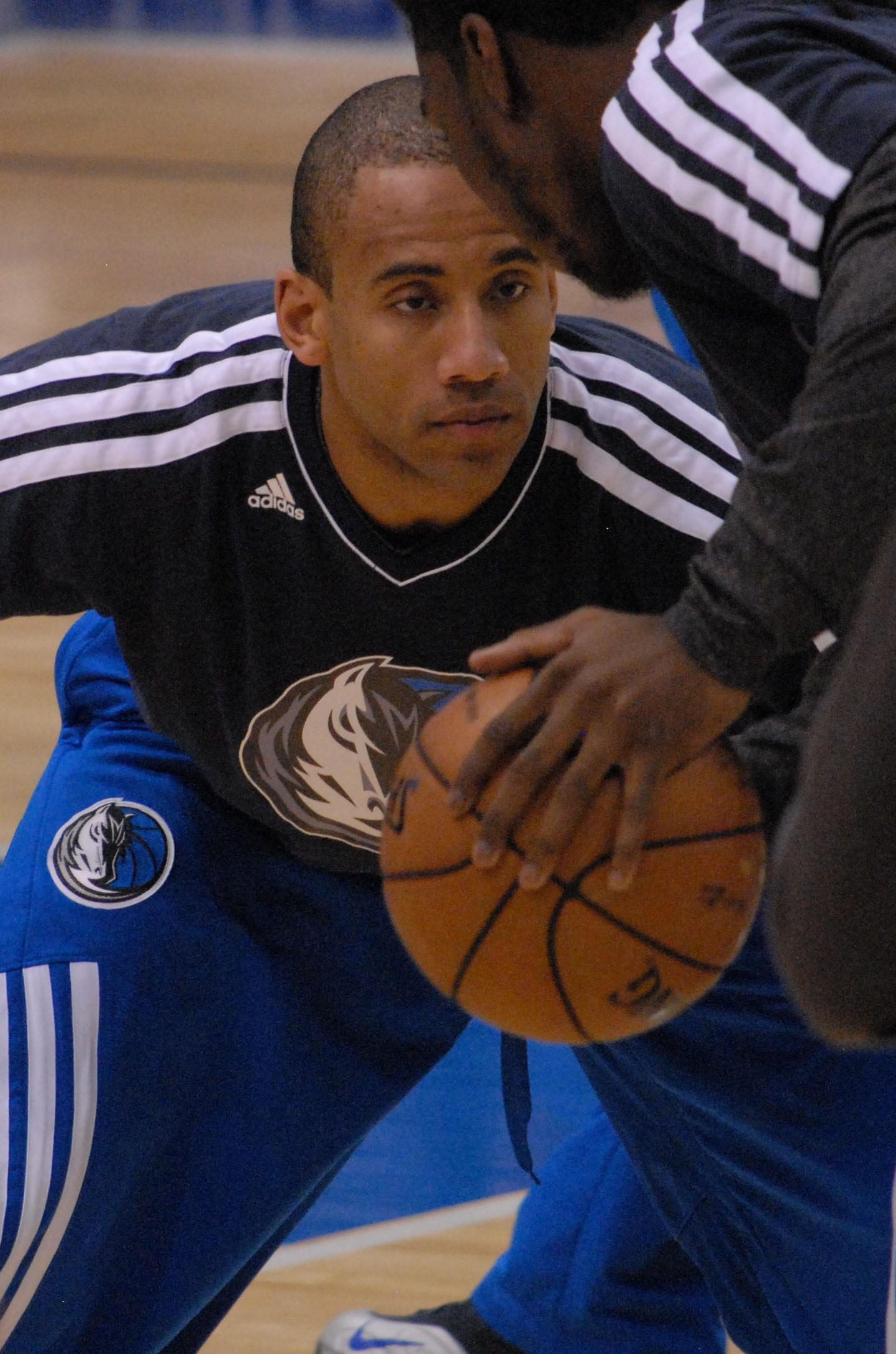
- Jones with the Dallas Mavericks in 2012

Los Angeles Clippers
- Title: Assistant coach
- League: NBA

Personal information
- Born: December 27, 1980 (age 45) Trenton, New Jersey, U.S.
- Listed height: 6 ft 6 in (1.98 m)
- Listed weight: 225 lb (102 kg)

Career information
- High school: Steinert (Hamilton, New Jersey)
- College: Rutgers (1998–2000); Duke (2001–2003)
- NBA draft: 2003: 1st round, 20th overall pick
- Drafted by: Boston Celtics
- Playing career: 2003–2017
- Position: Small forward / shooting guard
- Number: 30, 7, 1, 31
- Coaching career: 2020–present

Career history

Playing
- 2003–2007: Memphis Grizzlies
- 2007–2008: Sacramento Kings
- 2008: Fort Wayne Mad Ants
- 2008–2009: Denver Nuggets
- 2009–2012: Indiana Pacers
- 2012–2013: Dallas Mavericks
- 2013: Atlanta Hawks
- 2014–2015: Fort Wayne Mad Ants
- 2015: Los Angeles Clippers
- 2015–2016: Grand Rapids Drive
- 2016–2017: Cleveland Cavaliers

Coaching
- 2020–present: Los Angeles Clippers (player development)

Career highlights
- NBA champion (2016); First-team All-ACC (2003); 2× ACC All-Defensive Team (2002, 2003); Big East All-Rookie Team (1999)
- Stats at NBA.com
- Stats at Basketball Reference
Medals
Men's basketball
Representing United States
FIBA U21 World Championship
Gold medal – first place	2001 Saitama	National team

Dahntay Lavall Jones (born December 27, 1980) is an American professional basketball coach and former player who is an assistant coach for the Los Angeles Clippers of the National Basketball Association (NBA). He played college basketball for the Rutgers Scarlet Knights and Duke Blue Devils. Jones played in the NBA as a small forward and shooting guard from 2003 to 2017. He won an NBA championship with the Cleveland Cavaliers in 2016.

== Early life ==
Jones grew up in Hamilton Square, New Jersey, and starred at Steinert High School in Hamilton Township, Mercer County, from 1995 to 1998. He earned a McDonald's All-America honorable mention honor as a senior after averaging 24 points and 9 rebounds per game at Steinert.

== College career ==
After playing college basketball at Rutgers in his freshman and sophomore years, Jones transferred to Duke, where he earned All-ACC Honorable Mention honors in 2002 after averaging 11.2 points, 4.2 rebounds and 1.1 assists as a junior. In his senior season, he played 33 games, averaging 17.7 points, 5.5 rebounds and 1.2 steals per game.

== Professional career ==
=== Memphis Grizzlies (2003–2007) ===
Jones was selected by the Boston Celtics with the 20th overall pick in the 2003 NBA draft, and his rights were later traded, along with the rights to Troy Bell, to the Memphis Grizzlies for the rights to Kendrick Perkins and Marcus Banks. On November 21, 2003, he made his professional debut in a 98–97 win over the Seattle SuperSonics, recording one rebound, one assist and two blocks in eight minutes off the bench. In four professional seasons for the Grizzlies, Jones averaged 5.0 points per game.

=== Sacramento Kings (2007–2008) ===
On September 27, 2007, Jones signed with the Boston Celtics. However, he was later waived by the Celtics on October 25. On December 10, he signed with the Sacramento Kings. Four days later, he made his debut with the Kings in a 109–99 win over the Philadelphia 76ers, recording one assist and two steals in seven minutes off the bench. On February 16, 2008, he was waived by the Kings.

=== Fort Wayne Mad Ants (2008) ===
On March 21, 2008, Jones was acquired by the Fort Wayne Mad Ants of the NBA Development League. That night, he made his debut for the Mad Ants in a 125–102 loss to the Dakota Wizards, recording 18 points in 31 minutes.

=== Denver Nuggets (2008–2009) ===
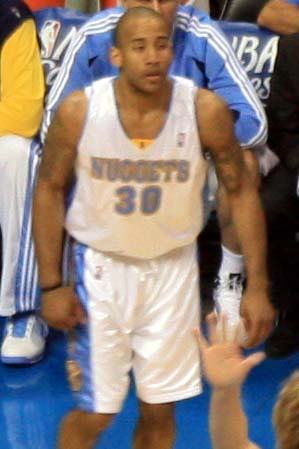
Jones with the Nuggets in 2009

On July 30, 2008, Jones signed with the Denver Nuggets. On October 29, he made his debut for the Nuggets in a 98–94 loss to the Utah Jazz, recording three points, three rebounds and one steal in 14 minutes off the bench. The Nuggets went on to reach the Western Conference Finals but were defeated 4 games to 2 by the Los Angeles Lakers.

=== Indiana Pacers (2009–2012) ===
On July 14, 2009, Jones signed a four-year deal with the Indiana Pacers. On October 28, he made his debut for the Pacers in a 120–109 loss to the Atlanta Hawks, recording 17 points and five rebounds in 26 minutes.

=== Dallas Mavericks (2012–2013) ===
On July 12, 2012, Jones was traded, along with Darren Collison, to the Dallas Mavericks in exchange for Ian Mahinmi. On October 30, he made his debut for the Mavericks in a 99–91 win over the Los Angeles Lakers.

=== Atlanta Hawks (2013) ===
On February 21, 2013, Jones was traded to the Atlanta Hawks in exchange for Anthony Morrow. The next day, he made his debut for the Hawks in a 122–108 win over the Sacramento Kings.

On September 27, 2013, Jones signed with the Chicago Bulls. However, he was later waived by the Bulls on October 8, 2013. Jones did not play for the 2013–14 season.

=== Return to Fort Wayne (2014–2015) ===
On September 25, 2014, Jones signed with the Utah Jazz. However, he was later waived by the Jazz on October 22, 2014. On November 26, 2014, Jones was reacquired by the Fort Wayne Mad Ants. Two days later, he made his season debut in a 124–115 loss to the Delaware 87ers, recording 14 points, one rebound, three assists, one steal and one block in 19 minutes off the bench.

=== Los Angeles Clippers (2015) ===
On January 14, 2015, Jones signed a 10-day contract with the Los Angeles Clippers. Two days later, he made his debut for the Clippers in a 126–121 loss to the Cleveland Cavaliers. On January 24, he signed a second 10-day contract with the Clippers. On February 3, he signed with the Clippers for the rest of the season. On March 9, the league fined Jones $10,000 for bumping Draymond Green of the Golden State Warriors during a postgame interview following the previous night's Warriors win over the Clippers. Jones denied that the bump was intentional.

=== Grand Rapids Drive (2015–2016) ===
On September 10, 2015, Jones signed with the Brooklyn Nets. However, he was later waived by the Nets on October 26 after appearing in four preseason games. On December 4, he was acquired by the Grand Rapids Drive of the NBA Development League. The next day, he made his debut for the Drive in a 128–99 win over Raptors 905, recording 13 points, two rebounds, one assist, one steal and one block in 20 minutes off the bench.

=== Cleveland Cavaliers (2016–2017) ===
On April 13, 2016, Jones signed with the Cleveland Cavaliers. That night, he made his debut for the Cavaliers in a 112–110 loss to the Detroit Pistons, recording 13 points, five rebounds, two assists, one steal and two blocks in 42 minutes off the bench. On May 22, he was suspended for Game 4 of the Eastern Conference Finals for striking Toronto Raptors' center Bismack Biyombo in the groin during the final possession of Game 3. The Cavaliers went on to win the series in six games and advanced to the 2016 NBA Finals. Jones saw some early minutes in Game 6 of the NBA Finals after several teammates were in foul trouble. He finished Game 6 with five points, one rebound and one block. The Cavaliers came back from a 3–1 deficit to win the series in seven games, as Jones won his first NBA championship.

Jones was waived by the Cavaliers on July 30, 2016, then re-signed on September 26, waived again on October 24, and re-signed yet again on April 12, 2017. Jones played three minutes at the end of the Cavaliers' 116–105 Game 1 Eastern Conference semifinals win over the Raptors on May 1 and picked up back-to-back technical fouls for talking trash to Toronto's Norman Powell, which earned him an ejection with 18.7 seconds remaining. The technicals came with a $3,000 fine attached to each of them, but due to earning only $9,127 in salary with the team for the postseason run—the veteran's minimum—teammate LeBron James covered the fine. The Cavaliers went 12–1 over the first three rounds of the playoffs to reach the NBA Finals for a third straight season. The Cavaliers played the Warriors in the 2017 NBA Finals and lost the series in 5 games.

Jones' final NBA game was Game 4 of that Finals series against Golden State on June 9, 2017. Cleveland would win the game 137 - 116 with Jones recording 1 rebound and playing for only 2 minutes (coming in at the very end of the 4th quarter, when the Cavs already built a 21-point lead to end the game).

== Coaching career ==
On November 16, 2020, Jones was announced as a player development and video coach for the Los Angeles Clippers.

== NBA career statistics ==
Legend
GP	Games played	GS	Games started	MPG	Minutes per game
FG%	Field goal percentage	3P%	3-point field goal percentage	FT%	Free throw percentage
RPG	Rebounds per game	APG	Assists per game	SPG	Steals per game
BPG	Blocks per game	PPG	Points per game	**Bold**	Career high
†	Won an NBA championship

=== Regular season ===
Year	Team	GP	GS	MPG	FG%	3P%	FT%	RPG	APG	SPG	BPG	PPG
2003–04	Memphis	20	0	7.8	.283	.250	.455	1.1	.6	.3	.3	1.8
2004–05	Memphis	52	7	12.5	.437	.383	.688	1.3	.4	.3	.2	4.5
2005–06	Memphis	71	4	13.6	.414	.143	.645	1.5	.5	.5	.2	4.0
2006–07	Memphis	78	25	21.4	**.477**	.417	.793	2.0	.9	.5	.3	7.5
2007–08	Sacramento	25	0	8.2	.434	.167	.667	1.4	.5	.3	.2	3.2
2008–09	Denver	**79**	**71**	18.1	.458	**.647**	.728	2.1	1.0	**.6**	.2	5.4
2009–10	Indiana	76	26	**24.9**	.461	.125	.770	**3.0**	**2.0**	.5	**.5**	10.2
2010–11	Indiana	45	2	13.1	.467	.359	.767	1.4	.7	.4	.2	6.3
2011–12	Indiana	65	3	16.2	.409	.429	**.838**	1.8	1.0	.4	.2	5.3
2012–13	Dallas	50	15	12.7	.357	.216	.805	1.4	.6	.2	.1	3.5
2012–13	Atlanta	28	4	13.6	.390	.250	.677	1.1	.7	.4	.0	3.1
2014–15	L.A. Clippers	33	0	3.7	.286	.000	.818	.3	.1	.1	.0	.6
2015–16†	Cleveland	1	0	42.0	.429	.500	.000	5.0	2.0	1.0	2.0	**13.0**
2016–17	Cleveland	1	0	12.0	.375	.000	.750	2.0	1.0	.0	.0	9.0
**Career**		624	157	15.7	.439	.329	.751	1.7	.8	.4	.2	5.4

=== Playoffs ===
Year	Team	GP	GS	MPG	FG%	3P%	FT%	RPG	APG	SPG	BPG	PPG
2005	Memphis	3	0	**24.0**	.381	**.600**	.750	**3.0**	.3	.3	.0	7.3
2006	Memphis	4	0	11.5	.714	.000	.000	1.8	.0	.3	.0	4.3
2009	Denver	**16**	**16**	17.5	.481	.250	.767	2.4	.6	**.8**	**.3**	7.0
2011	Indiana	3	0	16.7	.450	.000	.889	.7	**.7**	.3	.0	**8.7**
2012	Indiana	7	0	8.3	.222	.222	**1.000**	1.0	.4	.1	.0	2.4
2013	Atlanta	5	0	3.8	.250	.000	**1.000**	.2	.0	.0	.0	.8
2015	L.A. Clippers	11	0	1.6	**1.000**	.000	.000	.1	.0	.2	.0	.4
2016†	Cleveland	15	0	3.3	.462	.333	.800	.5	.1	.1	.1	1.1
2017	Cleveland	10	0	3.3	.500	.500	**1.000**	.7	.1	.0	.1	1.6
**Career**		74	16	8.5	.448	.294	.812	1.1	.3	.3	.1	3.2

== Personal life ==
Jones is the son of Larry and Joanne Jones. His father played college basketball at St. Peter's College. His cousin, Al Harrington, is a retired professional basketball player. He was previously married to Valeisha Butterfield Jones, the daughter of North Carolina Congressman G. K. Butterfield. They share two children, Dahntay Jr. and Dillon. Jones also has three other children from previous relationships.
