= Open Window Institute =

Open Window
- Type: Private
- Established: 1993
- CEO: Nigel Tattersall
- Undergraduates: +/- 1000
- Location: Centurion, Gauteng, RSA
- Campus: John Vorster Drive Ext. East, Southdowns, Irene
- Website: www.openwindow.co.za

Open Window is an accredited private higher education provider. It was established in 1993 as an art school. It has since expanded into an institute offering three accredited bachelor's degrees and postgraduate degrees.

Open Window provides dynamic practice-led higher education integrating conceptual thinking and academic rigour in applied arts. Its approach is multi-disciplinary, with the following subject choices:

- Communication Design
- Illustration
- Photography
- User Experience Design
- Interactive Development
- Product (Industrial) Design
- Film & Television
- Screen Acting
- Screen Writing
- Production Design
- Motion Design
- Sound Design
- 3D Animation & Game Design.

Students are high school students, gap-year students, graduates, corporates, professionals and others.

== Qualifications ==
=== Bachelor of Arts Honours in Visual Communication NQF 8 ===
A four-year Honours degrees includes a mix of practical work, critical and creative thinking, as well as research.

All qualifications are accredited by the Council on Higher Education (CHE) and are registered with the South African Qualifications Authority (SAQA).

=== Postgraduate Diploma in Creative Practice NQF 8 ===
The Open Window’s Postgraduate Diploma in Creative Practice is offered at NQF level 8 and consists of 120 credits in total.

The degree's methodology is practice-led and practice-focused and comprises both practical and theoretical components that are examinable.

=== Bachelor of Film Arts NQF 7 ===
This includes the following majors:

- Film & Television
- Sound Design
- Motion Design
- 3D Animation
- Game Design
- Production Design
- Screen Acting
- Screenwriting

=== Bachelor of Creative Technologies NQF 7 ===
This includes the following majors:

- User Experience Design
- Interaction Development
- Industrial Product Design

=== Bachelor of Arts in Visual Communication Design NQF 7 ===
This includes the following majors:

- Communication Design
- Illustration
- Photography
