= Josh McRoberts =

American basketball player (born 1987)

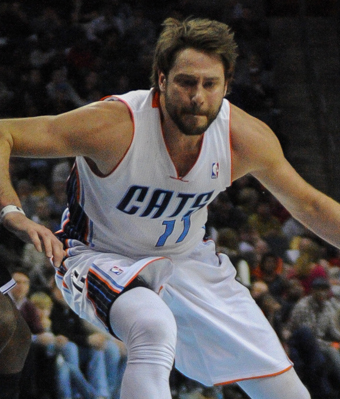
- McRoberts with the Charlotte Bobcats in 2013

Personal information
- Born: February 28, 1987 (age 39) Indianapolis, Indiana, U.S.
- Listed height: 6 ft 10 in (2.08 m)
- Listed weight: 240 lb (109 kg)

Career information
- High school: Carmel (Carmel, Indiana)
- College: Duke (2005–2007)
- NBA draft: 2007: 2nd round, 37th overall pick
- Drafted by: Portland Trail Blazers
- Playing career: 2007–2018
- Position: Power forward
- Number: 4, 32, 6, 17, 11, 13

Career history
- 2007–2008: Portland Trail Blazers
- 2008: →Idaho Stampede
- 2008–2011: Indiana Pacers
- 2011–2012: Los Angeles Lakers
- 2012–2013: Orlando Magic
- 2013–2014: Charlotte Bobcats
- 2014–2017: Miami Heat
- 2017–2018: Dallas Mavericks

Career highlights
- Second-team All-ACC (2007); ACC All-Defensive Team (2007); Morgan Wootten National Player of the Year (2005); McDonald's All-American MVP (2005); First-team Parade All-American (2005)
- Stats at NBA.com
- Stats at Basketball Reference

Joshua Scott McRoberts (born February 28, 1987) is an American former professional basketball player who played eleven seasons in the National Basketball Association (NBA). McRoberts, a 6-foot-10-inch (2.08 m) power forward, played college basketball for the Duke Blue Devils. He was selected by the Portland Trail Blazers with the 37th overall pick in the 2007 NBA draft.

== High school career ==
McRoberts attended Carmel High School in Carmel, Indiana, and led the Greyhounds in both scoring and rebounding during his senior year.

He averaged 17.9 points to go along with 11.4 rebounds, 4.2 assists and 3.0 blocked shots per game and shot .593 (166-of-280) from the field while guiding the Greyhounds to a 21–4 record and a trip to the sectional championship game in 2005. McRoberts was considered the number-one power forward prospect out of high school, and was projected to be drafted in the 2005 NBA draft had he declared.

As of 2021, 247sports.org rates McRoberts as the third-highest-rated recruit in the history of Duke basketball.

== College career ==
=== Freshman season ===
At Duke University, McRoberts averaged 8.7 points and 1.3 blocked shots while leading the team in field goal percentage (60.5%). McRoberts was named to the ACC All-Freshman team. He helped the Duke Blue Devils to a record of 32–4, the ACC regular season title, and the 2006 ACC tournament championship title by defeating Boston College. He was also named to the third team Freshman All-America by collegehoops.net.

McRoberts' late-season numbers improved as he recorded 10 of his 15 double-figure scoring games in his final 14 games, while averaging 10.4 points and 6.3 rebounds (with a 59.6 FG%).

Considered a potential NBA draft lottery pick, McRoberts instead stated he would not enter the draft, and would return to Duke for the 2006–07 season.

McRoberts underwent a successful lumbar discectomy on August 3, 2006. He had been suffering from chronic back problems since high school and had the operation to alleviate the problem.

=== Sophomore season ===
On December 19, 2006, against Kent State, McRoberts had a career-high 19 points, six blocks, six rebounds, four assists, and four steals making him the first Duke player to tally at least four in all five categories.

== Professional career ==
=== Portland Trail Blazers (2007–2008) ===
On March 22, 2007, McRoberts declared himself eligible for the 2007 NBA draft. On June 28, 2007, he was selected by the Portland Trail Blazers with the 37th overall pick in the NBA draft.

On January 9, 2008, McRoberts was assigned to the Idaho Stampede, the Trail Blazers' D-League affiliate. After being with the Stampede for nearly a month, and getting an over 20-minute-per-game increase in playing time, McRoberts was called back up to the Trail Blazers.

=== Indiana Pacers (2008–2011) ===
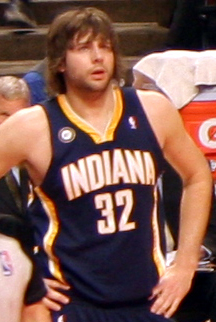
McRoberts in December 2009 as a member of the Pacers

On June 26, 2008, the night of the 2008 NBA draft, McRoberts was traded by the Trail Blazers to his hometown Indiana Pacers in a deal that sent him, along with Brandon Rush and Jarrett Jack in return, for 11th overall pick Jerryd Bayless and Ike Diogu.

=== Los Angeles Lakers (2011–2012) ===
On December 14, 2011, the Los Angeles Lakers signed McRoberts to a two-year deal worth about $6 million.

=== Orlando Magic (2012–2013) ===
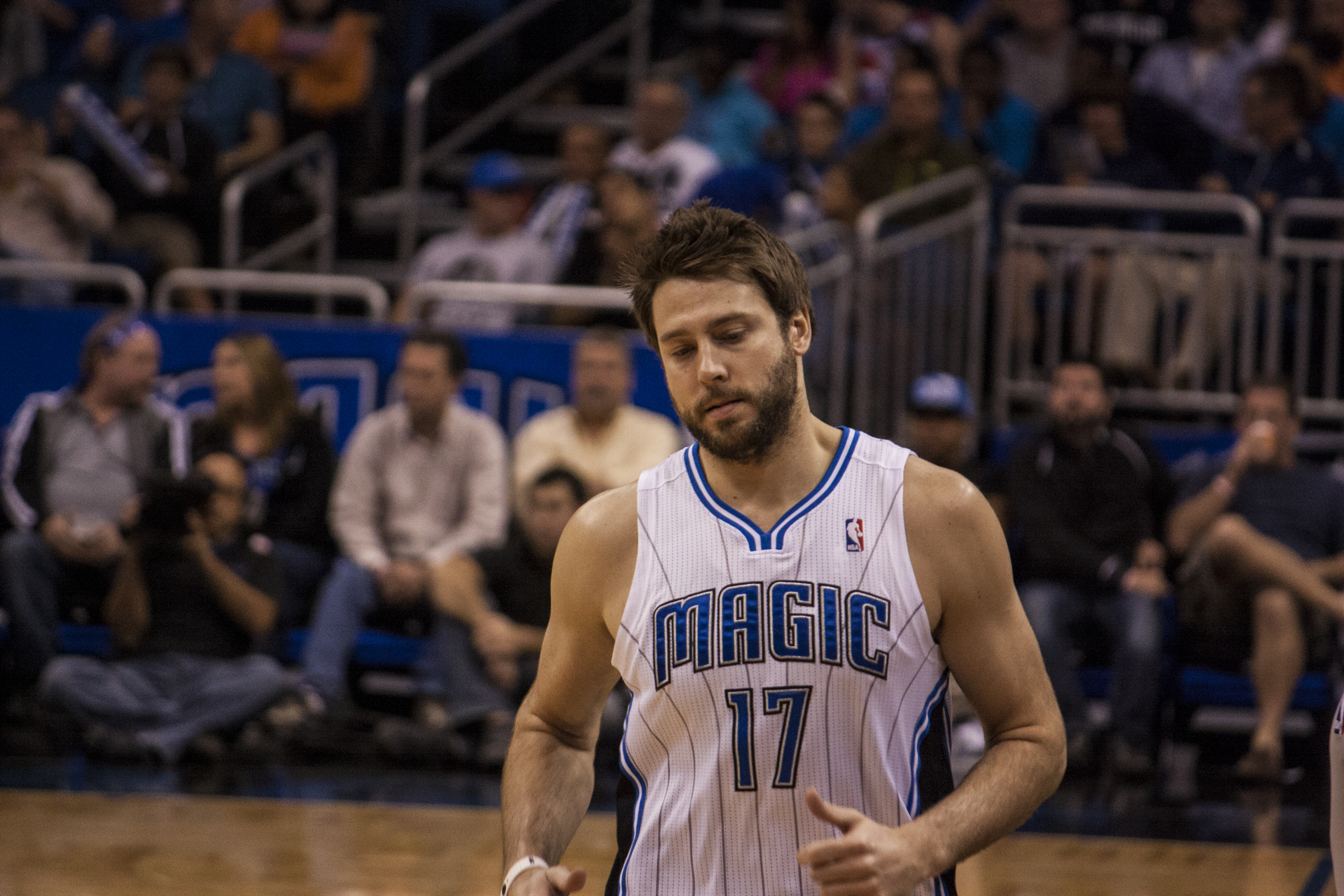
McRoberts playing for the Magic in 2012

On August 10, 2012, McRoberts was traded to the Orlando Magic as part of the blockbuster deal that sent All-Star center Dwight Howard to the Lakers.

=== Charlotte Bobcats (2013–2014) ===
On February 21, 2013, McRoberts was traded to the Charlotte Bobcats for Hakim Warrick.

On July 11, 2013, McRoberts re-signed with the Bobcats. On March 28, 2014, McRoberts scored a career-high 24 points in a loss to the Orlando Magic. He finished the season with career highs in games played and starts with 78 each. On April 30, 2014, McRoberts underwent successful surgery to remove bone spurs from his left big toe.

On June 18, 2014, McRoberts opted out of his 2014–15 contract with the Charlotte Hornets.

=== Miami Heat (2014–2017) ===
On July 14, 2014, McRoberts signed with the Miami Heat to a reported four-year, $23 million contract. After tearing his right meniscus on December 9, 2014, against the Phoenix Suns, McRoberts underwent surgery to repair it on December 22 and was subsequently ruled out for the rest of the 2014–15 season; he appeared in just 17 games.

After having most of 2014–15 season wiped out by injuries, McRoberts lost his starting spot because of Hassan Whiteside's emergence. He came into the 2015–16 season with a significant role off the bench, but that got away from him after missing nearly two months with a bruised knee.

On December 27, 2016, McRoberts was ruled out indefinitely with a stress fracture in his problematic left foot.

On May 23, 2017, McRoberts opted into his final year of his contract worth just over $6 million.

=== Dallas Mavericks (2017–2018) ===
On July 7, 2017, McRoberts was traded, along with a 2023 second-round draft pick and cash considerations, to the Dallas Mavericks in exchange for A. J. Hammons. On February 10, 2018, he was waived by the Mavericks. He saw action in two games for the Mavericks after spending the first 37 games of the season on the inactive list while rehabbing a left foot injury.

== Player profile ==
McRoberts can play both power forward and center. His scoring mostly comes off fast breaks, rebounds and hustle plays. He is a screen-setter with a decent jumper, and possesses excellent passing skills for a big man. He is considered an average defender. Former teammate Pau Gasol called McRoberts "scrappy and a hustler".

== Post-playing career ==
According to the Carmel Monthly magazine, McRoberts became an assistant coach for the Carmel High School's varsity basketball team during the 2020–21 season.

== Awards ==
=== High school ===
- 2005 McDonald's All-American Player of the Year
- 2005 McDonald's All-American Game MVP
- 2005 McDonald's All-American
- 2005 First-team Parade All-American
- 2005 National High School Coaches Assn. Senior Athlete of the Year

=== College ===
- 2006 ACC All-Tournament Second Team
- 2006 ACC All-Freshman Team
- 2006 Third Team Freshman All-America
- 2007 Atlantic Coast Sports Media Assocn All-ACC Second Team
- 2007 ACC All-Defensive Team

== NBA career statistics ==
Legend
GP	Games played	GS	Games started	MPG	Minutes per game
FG%	Field goal percentage	3P%	3-point field goal percentage	FT%	Free throw percentage
RPG	Rebounds per game	APG	Assists per game	SPG	Steals per game
BPG	Blocks per game	PPG	Points per game	**Bold**	Career high

=== Regular season ===
Year	Team	GP	GS	MPG	FG%	3P%	FT%	RPG	APG	SPG	BPG	PPG
2007–08	Portland	8	0	3.5	**.600**	.000	—	1.3	.3	.1	.0	1.5
2008–09	Indiana	33	0	8.5	.422	.000	.769	2.2	.5	.4	.5	2.4
2009–10	Indiana	42	3	12.5	.521	.348	.500	3.0	1.0	.4	.4	4.3
2010–11	Indiana	72	51	22.2	.547	.383	.739	5.3	2.1	.7	**.8**	7.4
2011–12	L.A. Lakers	50	6	14.4	.475	**.429**	.639	3.4	1.0	.3	.4	2.8
2012–13	Orlando	41	3	16.7	.392	.309	.733	3.3	1.7	.2	.3	3.9
2012–13	Charlotte	26	19	**30.8**	.505	.241	**.782**	**7.2**	2.7	**.8**	.6	**9.3**
2013–14	Charlotte	**78**	**78**	30.3	.436	.361	.729	4.8	**4.3**	.7	.6	8.5
2014–15	Miami	17	4	17.4	.528	.421	.615	2.6	1.9	.7	.2	4.2
2015–16	Miami	42	1	14.2	.372	.245	.700	2.5	1.9	.4	.2	3.6
2016–17	Miami	22	14	17.3	.373	.419	.667	3.4	2.3	.5	.2	4.9
2017–18	Dallas	2	0	3.0	.000	.000	—	.0	.0	.0	.0	.0
Career		433	179	19.1	.463	.340	.705	3.9	2.1	.5	.4	5.4

=== Playoffs ===
Year	Team	GP	GS	MPG	FG%	3P%	FT%	RPG	APG	SPG	BPG	PPG
2011	Indiana	5	0	15.8	.333	.000	.818	3.6	1.2	.8	.2	5.0
2012	L.A. Lakers	6	0	2.7	.250	.000	—	.7	.2	.0	.2	.3
2014	Charlotte	4	**4**	**38.5**	.455	**.471**	.800	**6.8**	**3.8**	**1.0**	.3	**11.5**
2016	Miami	**10**	0	13.4	**.471**	.000	**1.000**	2.6	.9	.5	**.5**	3.8
Career		25	4	15.3	.421	.308	.852	3.0	1.2	.5	.3	4.4
