= Brandon Rush =

American basketball player (born 1985)

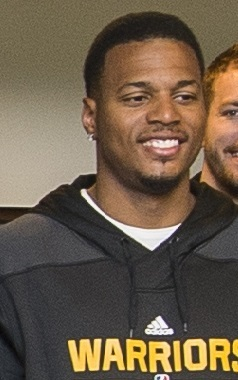
- Rush in 2015

Personal information
- Born: July 7, 1985 (age 41) Kansas City, Missouri, U.S.
- Listed height: 6 ft 6 in (1.98 m)
- Listed weight: 220 lb (100 kg)

Career information
- High school: Westport (Kansas City, Missouri); Mount Zion Christian Academy (Durham, North Carolina)
- College: Kansas (2005–2008)
- NBA draft: 2008: 1st round, 13th overall pick
- Drafted by: Portland Trail Blazers
- Playing career: 2008–2021
- Position: Shooting guard / small forward
- Number: 20, 4, 25

Career history
- 2008–2011: Indiana Pacers
- 2011–2013: Golden State Warriors
- 2013–2014: Utah Jazz
- 2014–2016: Golden State Warriors
- 2016–2017: Minnesota Timberwolves
- 2019–2021: Larisa

Career highlights
- NBA champion (2015); Greek League All Star (2020); NCAA champion (2008); Third-team All-American – NABC (2008); 3× First-team All-Big 12 (2006–2008); Big 12 Freshman of the Year (2006); Big 12 tournament MVP (2008); No. 25 jersey retired by Kansas Jayhawks
- Stats at NBA.com
- Stats at Basketball Reference

Brandon Leray Rush (born July 7, 1985) is an American former professional basketball player. He was drafted in the first round of the 2008 NBA draft by the Portland Trail Blazers, before being traded to the Indiana Pacers on draft day, after playing for Kansas for three seasons, including the 2008 championship season. He was selected as a Wooden Award All-American in both 2007 and 2008 as a Jayhawk. Rush has also played for the Golden State Warriors, Utah Jazz, and Minnesota Timberwolves, winning an NBA championship with the Warriors in 2015.

== High school career ==
Rush played high school basketball at Westport High School in Missouri and Mt. Zion Christian Academy in Durham, North Carolina.

Considered a five-star recruit by Rivals.com, Rush was listed as the No. 2 small forward and the No. 13 player in the nation in 2005. After withdrawing from the 2005 NBA draft, he committed to play collegiately at Kansas under Bill Self.

== College career ==
Rush was the starting small forward in every game that season. He led the Jayhawks in scoring (13.5 points per game), rebounding (5.9) and three-point shooting percentage (47.2%). He was instrumental in the team's Big 12 Conference championship run, and was elected the conference Freshman of the Year. He was also the first freshman ever to be named to the First Team All-Big 12, before Kevin Durant did it the following season for the Texas Longhorns. He was selected as the preseason Co-Player of the Year in the Big 12, along with fellow Jayhawk Julian Wright. He was also selected as a preseason All-American. In 2007, he earned a position on the All-Tournament Team in the Big 12 Tournament. On April 26, 2007, Rush announced his intentions to enter the 2007 NBA draft, but he did not sign with an agent.

=== Injury ===
Rush returned to Kansas in May 2007, after tearing the anterior cruciate ligament in his right knee in a pickup game. He had planned to enter the 2007 NBA draft had he not been injured, but returned to play for Kansas. On June 1, 2007, the torn ACL was successfully repaired. After rehabilitation, he returned to play in November, and became a starter soon afterward.

On October 27, 2010, it was reported that Rush had, in fact, suffered the ACL injury during an illegal workout conducted by Rodney Heard, director of East Coast scouting for the New York Knicks; Isiah Thomas, then-president of the Knicks, is said to have known of the secret workouts. Rush verified the allegation, and severe sanctions were expected to be levied against the Knicks organization.

=== Junior season ===
After returning to the starting lineup, he led Kansas to a national title in the 2008 NCAA championship. He was named Most Valuable Player in the national semifinal game against North Carolina, with 25 points and 7 rebounds. He was rated number one small forward in all of college basketball by Rivals.com for his overall statistics after being named MVP in the Big 12 Tournament and averaging 15.8 points per game in the six games of the NCAA national championship tournament. On April 17, 2008, he declared himself eligible for the 2008 NBA draft, skipping his senior year.

On February 22, 2017, the University of Kansas basketball program retired his jersey, #25.

== Professional career ==
=== Indiana Pacers (2008–2011) ===
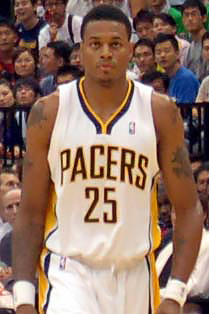
Rush with the Pacers in 2009

Rush was selected 13th overall by the Portland Trail Blazers in the 2008 NBA draft. He was then traded to the Indiana Pacers, along with Jarrett Jack and Josh McRoberts, for Jerryd Bayless and Ike Diogu.

=== Golden State Warriors (2011–2013) ===
On December 19, 2011, Rush was traded to the Golden State Warriors in exchange for Louis Amundson.

On August 1, 2012, Rush re-signed with the Warriors on a two-year, $8 million contract. In a game against the Memphis Grizzlies on November 2, 2012, Rush injured his left knee landing awkwardly after being fouled in the air by Zach Randolph. An MRI the next day revealed a torn ACL. The extent of the injury ruled him out for the remainder of the 2012–13 season.

=== Utah Jazz (2013–2014) ===
On July 10, 2013, Rush was traded, along with Richard Jefferson and Andris Biedriņš and several draft picks, to the Utah Jazz in a three-team trade that brought Andre Iguodala and Kevin Murphy to the Warriors.

=== Second stint with Golden State (2014–2016) ===
On July 22, 2014, Rush signed a two-year deal with the Golden State Warriors, returning to the franchise for a second stint. Rush won his first NBA championship with the Warriors after they defeated the Cleveland Cavaliers in the 2015 NBA Finals in six games.

On June 25, 2015, Rush exercised his player option with the Warriors for the 2015–16 season. On November 28, 2015, he started at small forward against the Sacramento Kings in place of the injured Harrison Barnes. He subsequently scored 16 points, his highest scoring total since scoring 19 points on April 22, 2012. On January 8, 2016, he scored a season-high 20 points on 8-of-9 shooting against the Portland Trail Blazers. Rush helped the Warriors win an NBA record 73 games to eclipse the 72 wins set by the 1995–96 Chicago Bulls. Rush played limited minutes during the Warriors playoff run to the NBA Finals. The Warriors would again face the Cleveland Cavaliers. Despite the Warriors going up 3–1 in the series following a Game 4 win, they went on to lose the series in seven games to become the first team in NBA history to lose the championship series after being up 3–1.

=== Minnesota Timberwolves (2016–2017) ===
On July 8, 2016, Rush signed with the Minnesota Timberwolves.

On September 19, 2017, Rush signed with the Milwaukee Bucks. He was waived on October 14 as one of the team's final preseason roster cuts.

=== Portland Trail Blazers (2018) ===
On February 21, 2018, the Portland Trail Blazers signed Rush to a 10-day contract. Rush left Portland after the 10-day contract expired, without even playing a game for the team.

=== Larisa (2019–2021) ===
On November 21, 2019, Rush returned to action and signed overseas with Greek Basket League club Larisa for the remainder of the 2019–2020 season. On August 26, 2020, Rush renewed his contract with the Greek team.

== NBA career statistics ==
Legend
GP	Games played	GS	Games started	MPG	Minutes per game
FG%	Field goal percentage	3P%	3-point field goal percentage	FT%	Free throw percentage
RPG	Rebounds per game	APG	Assists per game	SPG	Steals per game
BPG	Blocks per game	PPG	Points per game	**Bold**	Career high
†	Won an NBA championship	*	Led the league

=== Regular season ===
Year	Team	GP	GS	MPG	FG%	3P%	FT%	RPG	APG	SPG	BPG	PPG
2008–09	Indiana	75	19	24.0	.423	.373	.697	3.1	.9	.5	.5	8.1
2009–10	Indiana	**82***	**64**	**30.4**	.423	.411	.629	**4.2**	**1.4**	**.7**	.8	9.4
2010–11	Indiana	67	21	26.2	.421	.417	.755	3.2	.9	.6	.5	9.1
2011–12	Golden State	65	1	26.4	.501	**.452**	**.793**	3.9	**1.4**	.5	**.9**	**9.8**
2012–13	Golden State	2	0	12.5	**.667**	.000	.667	.5	1.0	.0	.0	7.0
2013–14	Utah	38	0	11.0	.333	.340	.600	1.2	.6	.1	.2	2.1
2014–15†	Golden State	33	0	8.2	.204	.111	.455	1.2	.4	.2	.4	.9
2015–16	Golden State	72	25	14.7	.427	.414	.643	2.5	.8	.3	.3	4.2
2016–17	Minnesota	47	33	21.9	.374	.386	.722	2.1	1.0	.5	.5	4.2
Career		481	163	22.0	.426	.402	.706	2.9	1.0	.5	.5	6.8

=== Playoffs ===
Year	Team	GP	GS	MPG	FG%	3P%	FT%	RPG	APG	SPG	BPG	PPG
2011	Indiana	5	0	**11.0**	**.462**	**.750**	**.500**	1.4	**.6**	**.2**	**.2**	**3.2**
2015†	Golden State	3	0	2.3	.167	.500	.000	1.0	.0	.0	.0	1.0
2016	Golden State	**14**	0	7.9	.450	.333	**.500**	**1.6**	.2	.1	.1	1.6
Career		22	0	7.8	.410	.444	.500	1.5	.3	.1	.1	1.9

== Personal life ==
Rush was born in Kansas City, Missouri. He is the brother of former professional basketball players JaRon and Kareem Rush.

He resides in Berkeley, California.

== See also ==
- List of National Basketball Association career 3-point field goal percentage leaders
