= Utah Jazz mural =

Mural in Salt Lake City, Utah, U.S.

- The mural in 2021
- Artist: Karabo Poppy
- Completion date: November 1, 2018
- Dimensions: 610 cm × 2,100 cm (20 ft × 70 ft)
- Location: Salt Lake City, Utah, U.S.; 40°45′45.1″N 111°53′46.7″W

Karabo Poppy's Utah Jazz mural is installed in Salt Lake City, Utah, United States. The mural was painted in 2018.

== Background ==
Poppy is a designer and artist who has worked extensively with many brands and received acclaim for her work.

Prior to painting the mural, Poppy had never been to Utah and only known about the Utah Jazz months prior to beginning her work. She spoke with members of the Utah Jazz in the 2018–19 season such as Ricky Rubio and his Jazz teammates Rudy Gobert, Joe Ingles, and Derrick Favors at the Zions Bank Basketball Campus before finalizing her design and beginning to paint the mural. She found herself drawn to the power of a slam dunk and the creativity of dribbling a basketball. She conceived the mural through these inspirations and sought to capture the energy of the game, jazz music, and Utah's love for the team while blending African aesthetics.

== Mural ==
The mural measures at 20 feet by 70 feet (6.096m x 21.336m), and it is located in the west-facing wall of Valter's Osteria in downtown Salt Lake City.

Poppy began work on the mural on October 21, 2018, and finished on November 1 shortly after midnight.

== See also ==
- Street art
