= Dan Burke (basketball) =

American basketball player-coach

Personal information
- Born: April 3, 1959 (age 67) Lynwood, California, U.S.

Career history

Coaching
- 1989–1997: Portland Trail Blazers (assistant)
- 1997–2020: Indiana Pacers (assistant)
- 2020–2023: Philadelphia 76ers (assistant)
- 2023–2024: Detroit Pistons (assistant)

Daniel P. Burke (born April 3, 1959, in Lynwood, California) is an American basketball coach who was most recently an assistant coach for the Detroit Pistons of the National Basketball Association (NBA).

== Coaching career ==
=== Portland Trail Blazers ===
Burke spent eight seasons (1989–1997) with the Trail Blazers and went to the playoffs each time including three Western Conference finals and two NBA Finals appearances in 1990 and 1992. During his time with the Blazers, Burke worked under Rick Adelman and P. J. Carlesimo.

=== Indiana Pacers ===
In 1997, Burke joined the Pacers. During his tenure the team reached the playoffs 14 times, including six Eastern Conference Finals appearances and one NBA Finals appearance. The Pacers have ranked in the league's top 10 defensive teams for the past five seasons, having the best defense rating in 2013–14. They also ranked in the NBA's top 10 for defensive field goal percentage 13 times during the last 17 seasons.

With the Pacers, Burke has worked under Larry Bird, Isiah Thomas, Rick Carlisle, Jim O'Brien, Frank Vogel, and Nate McMillan.

On May 16, 2016, when Larry Bird was asked about his priorities heading into free agency, he said, "[Burke] been a very important part over 19 years of what we’ve done here. It's important for me that he would be my first free agent."

=== Philadelphia 76ers ===
On November 9, 2020, the Philadelphia 76ers hired Burke as an assistant coach under Doc Rivers.

=== Detroit Pistons ===
On June 10, 2023, the Detroit Pistons hired Burke as an assistant coach under Monty Williams.
