= Devin Harris =

American basketball player (born 1983)

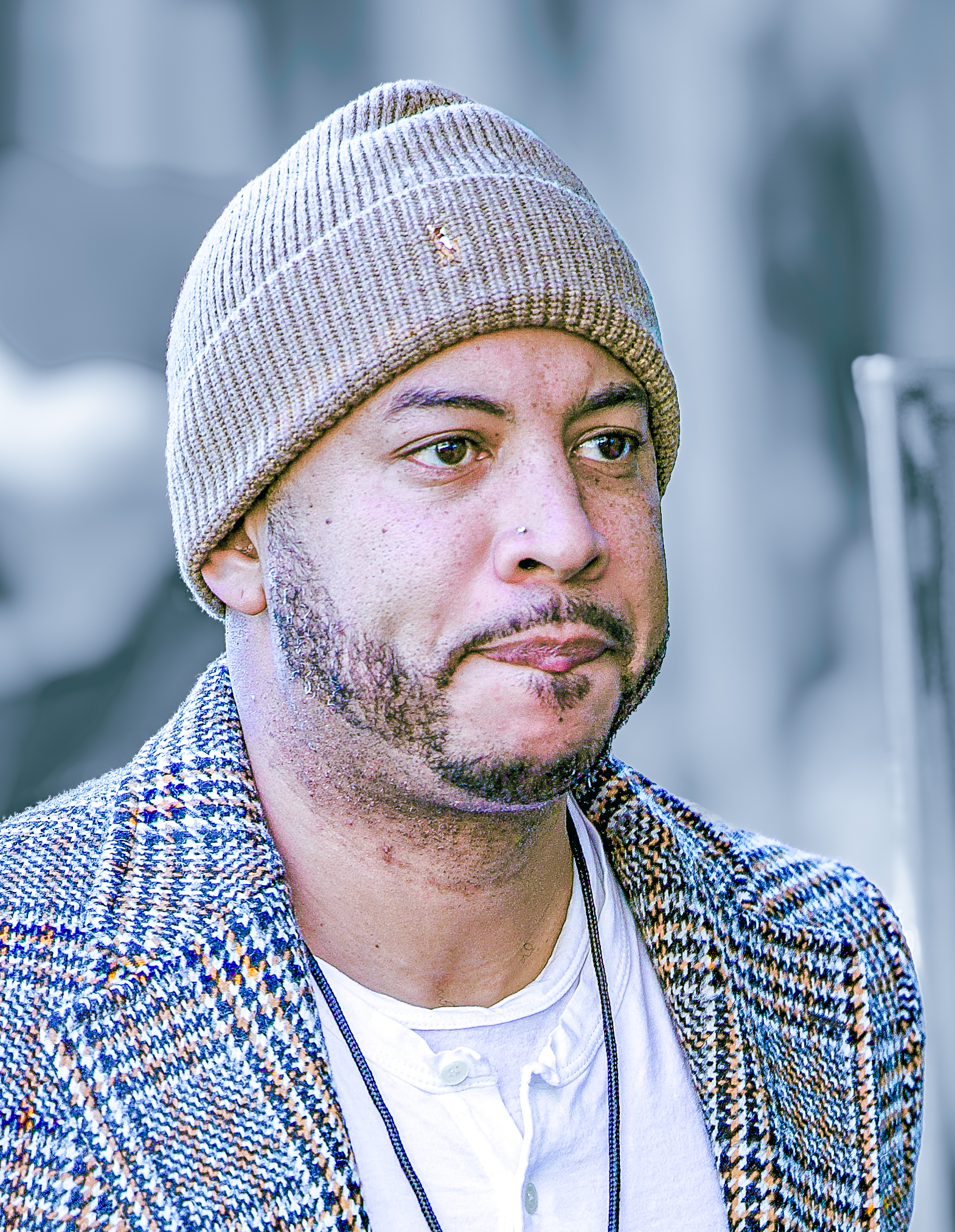
- Harris in 2022

Personal information
- Born: February 27, 1983 (age 43) Milwaukee, Wisconsin, U.S.
- Listed height: 6 ft 3 in (1.91 m)
- Listed weight: 185 lb (84 kg)

Career information
- High school: Wauwatosa East (Wauwatosa, Wisconsin)
- College: Wisconsin (2001–2004)
- NBA draft: 2004: 1st round, 5th overall pick
- Drafted by: Washington Wizards
- Playing career: 2004–2019
- Position: Point guard
- Number: 34, 5, 20

Career history
- 2004–2008: Dallas Mavericks
- 2008–2011: New Jersey Nets
- 2011–2012: Utah Jazz
- 2012–2013: Atlanta Hawks
- 2013–2018: Dallas Mavericks
- 2018: Denver Nuggets
- 2018–2019: Dallas Mavericks

Career highlights
- NBA All-Star (2009); Consensus second-team All-American (2004); Big Ten Player of the Year (2004); Big Ten tournament MOP (2004); Wisconsin Mr. Basketball (2001)

Career NBA statistics
- Points: 10,597 (10.8 ppg)
- Rebounds: 2,151 (2.2 rpg)
- Assists: 3,869 (3.9 apg)
- Stats at NBA.com
- Stats at Basketball Reference

Devin Lamar Harris (born February 27, 1983) is an American sports analyst and former professional basketball player. He played in the National Basketball Association (NBA) for 15 seasons, primarily with the Dallas Mavericks and New Jersey Nets.

Harris played college basketball for the Wisconsin Badgers and was selected with the fifth pick in the 2004 NBA draft by the Washington Wizards. He was an NBA All-Star with the Nets in 2009. He was hired by Bally Sports Southwest following his retirement from the NBA.

== Early life ==
Harris was born and raised in Milwaukee, Wisconsin; the son of Terry and Julie Harris. Throughout high school, Harris was a superior athlete and took up basketball and volleyball at Wauwatosa East High School. He played volleyball for only one season, a season in which he gained all-conference honors, before he set that aside to focus on basketball. Harris was nagged by injuries after his sophomore year of high school and was unable to participate in the summer basketball camps and tournaments that are ever important in the recruiting process.

Harris exploded his senior season at Wauwatosa East in 2001, setting school scoring records through an undefeated regular season. Harris was named Wisconsin's "Mr. Basketball" for 2001, edging out Travis Diener of Fond du Lac High School. Harris finally accepted an offer to play for Dick Bennett at the University of Wisconsin–Madison. Bennett retired in the midst of the upcoming season and by the time Harris arrived on campus, Bo Ryan was the head coach.

Harris's number 20 jersey was retired by Wauwatosa East at ceremonies held in 2007.

== College career ==
In Harris's freshman season, the 2001–02 season, he was a starter on an unheralded team. The Badgers came into the season being predicted to finish as low as ninth in the Big Ten Conference (which had eleven teams at the time). On a team led by seniors Charlie Wills and Travon Davis, the Badgers won an unexpected Big Ten Championship (shared with three other teams: Indiana, Illinois, and Ohio State).

Harris's sophomore season was his "breakout" year. Harris, along with senior Kirk Penney and fellow sophomore Mike Wilkinson, led the Badgers to their second consecutive Big Ten Championship. In the NCAA tournament, the Badgers reached the "Sweet 16". In the Sweet 16 game against Kentucky, Harris showcased his skill before a national audience, despite an eventual Badger loss.

The 2003–04 season saw Harris establish himself as one of the top players in the nation. Harris was the leader on the team and was considered a "coach on the floor" by Bo Ryan. He garnered several awards, including Big Ten Player of the Year, 2004 Big Ten men's basketball tournament MOP, the Silver Basketball award, and was named a Second Team All-American. Harris decided to leave college early after his junior year to play in the NBA.

== NBA career ==
=== Draft day ===
Days prior to the draft, the Washington Wizards and Dallas Mavericks agreed to a deal that involved the Wizards' 5th overall pick going to the Mavs along with Jerry Stackhouse and Christian Laettner in exchange for Antawn Jamison. NBA rules prevented teams from trading draft picks for two consecutive years (in addition to trade kicker details in Laettner's contract) so the deal was momentarily delayed until the actual draft in which Washington selected Harris and subsequently traded him to the Mavericks to complete the deal. The Mavs' plan was to bring Harris along slowly under the tutelage of all-star point guard Steve Nash but Nash ended up leaving the team through free agency and signing with the Phoenix Suns.

=== Dallas Mavericks (2004–2008) ===
In Harris's rookie season, he averaged 5.7 points and 2.2 assist per game, but put up a PER of 14.69. He ranked 2nd in the NBA in steals per 48 minutes at 3.15 (behind Larry Hughes), and in November 2004 was named the Rookie of the Month. Although he started for much of the early portion of the season, his playing time dwindled as the season progressed.

Harris showed marked improvement in the early stages of the 2005–06 season, especially when it came to scoring; as a result, his minutes increased and he took more ball-handling responsibilities from Jason Terry. He is known for his exceptional speed, earning comparisons to other NBA guards like the Phoenix Suns' Leandro Barbosa and his good friend, the Miami Heat's Dwyane Wade. He ended the year with averages of 9.9 points and 3.2 assists per game. He improved his jump-shot and his ability to split defenses and get to the rim. Midway through the year, he sustained a leg injury and missed most of the rest of the regular season. Harris returned for the playoffs and played a huge role in toppling the Mavericks' longtime rivals, the San Antonio Spurs. The Spurs had dominated the Mavs in recent playoff history, ending their playoff runs in 6 games in 2003 and 5 games in 2001. Devin Harris and the Mavericks reached the 2006 NBA Finals, where they lost to the Miami Heat 4 games to 2.

In the 2006–07 season, Harris averaged 10.2 points, 2.5 rebounds, and 3.7 assists per game. After becoming the starting point guard for the Mavericks in the 2006–07 season, he helped lead the Mavericks to a team record of 67 wins in the regular season only to be upset by the eighth-seeded Golden State Warriors in the 2007 playoffs. Halfway through the 2007–08 season, Harris was averaging career highs with 14.4 points per game and 5.4 assists per game. He was named a co-captain in 2007–08 along with Dirk Nowitzki.

=== New Jersey Nets (2008–2011) ===
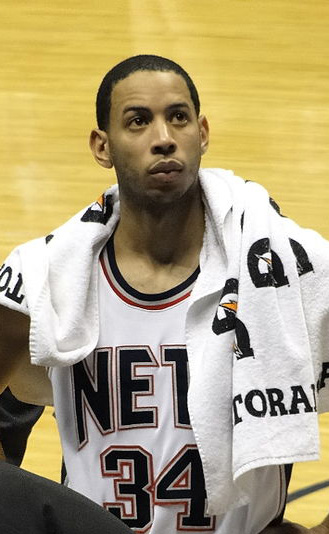
Harris with the Nets in 2009

On February 19, 2008, he was traded to the New Jersey Nets with Keith Van Horn, Trenton Hassell, DeSagana Diop, Maurice Ager, $3 million cash and two first-round draft picks (2008, 2010) in exchange for Jason Kidd, Malik Allen, and Antoine Wright. In his Nets home game debut against the Milwaukee Bucks, he posted 21 points and five assists in just under 21 minutes. Towards the end of the game he was treated to chants of "Dev-in Harris! Dev-in Harris!", and the first 5,000 attendees received Harris T-shirts in the Nets' next home game versus the San Antonio Spurs. After New Jersey missed the playoffs for the first time in 7 years, he expressed that he was not satisfied with the way he played toward the season's end and he said he would mainly need to work on his assertiveness on offense over the summer.

On November 7, 2008, Harris posted a career-high 38 points against All-Star Allen Iverson, who was making his debut with the Detroit Pistons. He later bettered that mark on November 30 with 47 points, including scoring 21 in both the first half and the fourth quarter, against the Suns in the Nets' first win in Phoenix since 1993. On December 19, in Dallas's first game at the Nets' Izod Center since the trade between the two teams, Harris put on a masterful performance posting 41 points and a season-high 13 assists in a blowout victory against his former team, while outplaying the player for whom he was essentially traded, Jason Kidd. Towards the end of the game, Nets fans were chanting "Thank you Cuban!" (Mavericks team owner Mark Cuban was sitting courtside). On January 29, 2009, Harris was named a reserve for the 2009 NBA All-Star Game. It was the first and only time Harris was named as an All-Star in his career. On February 23, 2009, in a game against the 76ers, Harris converted a half-court buzzer-beating 47-foot shot, known as "the Harris Heave," to win the game 98–96.

In a cost-cutting move, the Nets traded Vince Carter on the same day of the 2009 NBA draft, leaving Harris to assume the role of team captain. Harris was out for large portions of the season with shoulder and ankle injuries, including the team's infamous 0–18 start. His personal play, stats, and talent around him were well below the previous year but he managed to bring his averages back up to just under 17 points per game and 6 assists per game. In order to reduce his risk of injury, Harris took part in a weight training program during the summer of 2010 at Nets' head coach (and Harris's former head coach in Dallas) Avery Johnson's request. He managed to add 15 pounds of muscle and also worked on his defense with Tim Grover.

=== Utah Jazz (2011–2012) ===
On February 23, 2011, Harris was traded along with rookie Derrick Favors, two draft picks and $3 million cash to the Utah Jazz in exchange for Deron Williams.

=== Atlanta Hawks (2012–2013) ===
On July 11, 2012, Harris was traded to the Atlanta Hawks for Marvin Williams.

=== Return to Dallas (2013–2018) ===
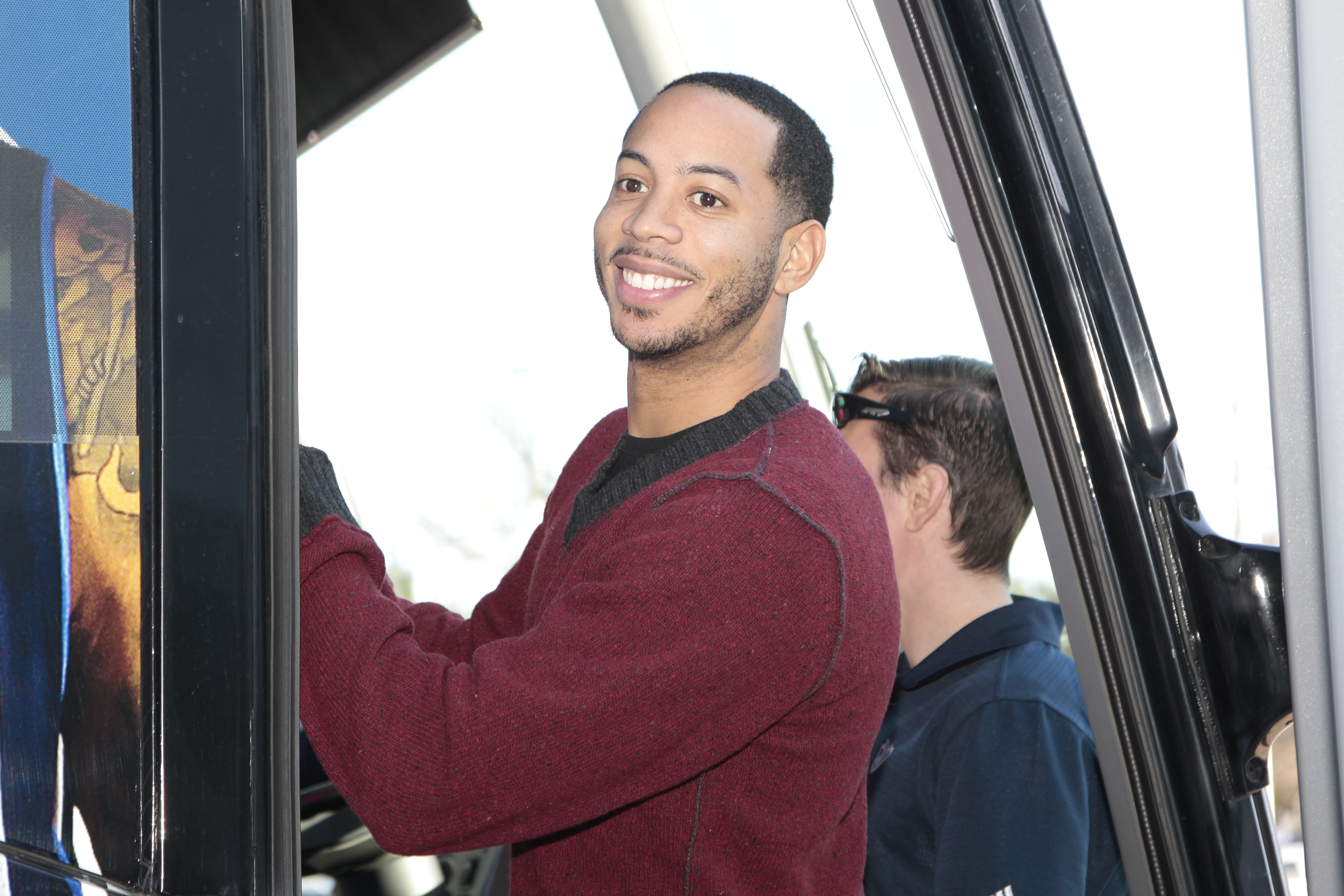
Harris in 2014

In early July 2013, it was widely reported that Harris would return to his original team, the Dallas Mavericks. However, the deal was later rescinded after it was discovered that Harris required surgery for a toe injury. Despite the injury concerns, Mavericks owner Mark Cuban expressed his intention to reunite with Harris, stating that he'd be returning to the team following a restructured deal, and on July 31, Harris signed with the Mavericks to a one-year, $1.3 million contract.

On January 18, 2014, Harris made his season debut and scored six points in 17 minutes off the bench in the Mavericks' 127–111 loss to the Portland Trail Blazers. He played well off the bench for the Mavericks over the second half of the 2013–14 season, scoring a season-high 20 points on March 9 in a win over the Indiana Pacers. His performance off the bench during the Mavericks' first-round series loss to the San Antonio Spurs was impressive, scoring over 17 points in three of the series' seven games.

On July 17, 2014, Harris re-signed with the Mavericks to a four-year, $16.5 million contract. Harris entered the 2014–15 season as the team's wily veteran and was much healthier than he had been the previous year, and it showed. He missed just six games all season, providing a constant spark off the bench behind Rajon Rondo and Monta Ellis. In the team's fourth last game of the season on April 10, Harris scored a season-high 21 points against the Denver Nuggets. He went on to play in four of the Mavericks' five first-round playoff games against the Houston Rockets. His 2014 playoff form did not follow over to 2015, though, as he scored in double figures in just one game and shot 8-of-23 from the field in the 4–1 series loss.

Harris played in 40 of the team's first 46 games to begin the 2015–16 season, averaging 7.4 points per game off the bench. A left big toe strain suffered in late January forced him out of action for 10 games, returning to the line-up on February 21 against the Philadelphia 76ers.

On October 26, 2016, Harris was ruled out for the first three weeks of the 2016–17 season after he sprained his right big toe during preseason. He made his season debut on November 30, 2016, against the San Antonio Spurs after missing the first 16 games.

=== Denver Nuggets (2018) ===
On February 8, 2018, Harris was acquired by the Denver Nuggets in a three-team trade that also involved the Mavericks and the New York Knicks, in which Doug McDermott was sent to the Mavericks and Emmanuel Mudiay was sent to the Knicks. On March 6, 2018, in a 118–107 loss to the Mavericks, Harris reached 10,000 points for his career.

=== Third stint with Dallas (2018–2019) ===
On August 8, 2018, Harris signed with the Dallas Mavericks, returning to the franchise for a third stint. He missed 10 games early in the season with a left hamstring strain. On November 28, Harris led (Luka Dončić also scored 20 points) the Mavericks in scoring with a season high 20 points, in a 128–108 win over the Houston Rockets.

Harris's final NBA game was played on April 10, 2019, in a 94–105 loss to the San Antonio Spurs. In his final game, Harris recorded 12 points, 2 rebounds and 4 assists as the Mavs' starting point guard. This game was also Harris' teammate Dirk Nowitzki's final NBA game.

== Broadcast career ==
Harris is currently a MavsTV analyst covering the Dallas Mavericks, a position he started when they were on Bally Sports Southwest, and has also worked for Fox Sports covering college basketball.

== NBA career statistics ==
Legend
| GP | Games played | GS | Games started | MPG | Minutes per game |
| FG% | Field goal percentage | 3P% | 3-point field goal percentage | FT% | Free throw percentage |
| RPG | Rebounds per game | APG | Assists per game | SPG | Steals per game |
| BPG | Blocks per game | PPG | Points per game | **Bold** | Career high |

=== Regular season ===
| Year | Team | GP | GS | MPG | FG% | 3P% | FT% | RPG | APG | SPG | BPG | PPG |
|---|---|---|---|---|---|---|---|---|---|---|---|---|
| 2004–05 | Dallas | 76 | 19 | 15.4 | .429 | .336 | .757 | 1.3 | 2.2 | 1.0 | **.3** | 5.7 |
| 2005–06 | Dallas | 56 | 4 | 22.8 | .469 | .238 | .716 | 2.2 | 3.2 | .9 | **.3** | 9.9 |
| 2006–07 | Dallas | **80** | 61 | 26.0 | **.492** | .280 | .824 | 2.5 | 3.7 | 1.2 | **.3** | 10.2 |
| 2007–08 | Dallas | 39 | 39 | 30.4 | .483 | .357 | .821 | 2.3 | 5.3 | 1.4 | .1 | 14.4 |
| 2007–08 | New Jersey | 25 | 22 | 33.5 | .438 | .320 | .829 | **3.3** | 6.5 | 1.4 | **.3** | 15.4 |
| 2008–09 | New Jersey | 69 | **69** | **36.1** | .438 | .291 | .820 | **3.3** | 6.9 | **1.7** | .2 | **21.3** |
| 2009–10 | New Jersey | 64 | 61 | 34.7 | .403 | .276 | .798 | 3.2 | 6.6 | 1.2 | .3 | 16.9 |
| 2010–11 | New Jersey | 54 | 54 | 31.9 | .425 | .300 | .840 | 2.4 | **7.6** | 1.1 | .1 | 15.0 |
| 2010–11 | Utah | 17 | 16 | 31.2 | .413 | .357 | .811 | 2.4 | 5.4 | .8 | .1 | 15.8 |
| 2011–12 | Utah | 63 | 63 | 27.6 | .445 | **.362** | .746 | 1.8 | 5.0 | 1.0 | .2 | 11.3 |
| 2012–13 | Atlanta | 58 | 34 | 24.5 | .438 | .335 | .727 | 2.0 | 3.4 | 1.1 | .2 | 9.9 |
| 2013–14 | Dallas | 40 | 0 | 20.5 | .378 | .307 | .800 | 2.1 | 4.5 | .7 | .1 | 7.9 |
| 2014–15 | Dallas | 76 | 3 | 22.2 | .418 | .357 | .815 | 1.8 | 3.1 | 1.0 | .2 | 8.8 |
| 2015–16 | Dallas | 64 | 0 | 20.0 | .447 | .329 | .721 | 2.2 | 1.8 | .9 | .2 | 7.6 |
| 2016–17 | Dallas | 65 | 0 | 16.7 | .399 | .328 | .829 | 2.0 | 2.1 | .7 | .1 | 6.7 |
| 2017–18 | Dallas | 44 | 1 | 18.3 | .415 | .352 | .830 | 1.9 | 1.9 | .8 | .2 | 8.5 |
| 2017–18 | Denver | 27 | 0 | 19.7 | .406 | .343 | **.845** | 1.6 | 2.5 | .5 | .1 | 8.2 |
| 2018–19 | Dallas | 68 | 2 | 15.8 | .380 | .310 | .761 | 1.6 | 1.8 | .5 | .2 | 6.3 |
| Career | | 985 | 448 | 24.3 | .432 | .325 | .796 | 2.2 | 3.9 | 1.0 | .2 | 10.8 |
| All-Star | | 1 | 0 | 17.0 | .500 | .000 | .000 | 1.0 | .0 | .0 | .0 | 6.0 |

=== Playoffs ===
| Year | Team | GP | GS | MPG | FG% | 3P% | FT% | RPG | APG | SPG | BPG | PPG |
|---|---|---|---|---|---|---|---|---|---|---|---|---|
| 2005 | Dallas | 9 | 0 | 8.9 | .438 | .333 | .667 | 1.2 | 1.2 | .4 | .1 | 2.4 |
| 2006 | Dallas | **23** | **15** | 24.3 | .480 | .000 | .703 | 1.7 | 2.2 | .8 | .1 | 9.4 |
| 2007 | Dallas | 6 | 6 | 27.2 | .492 | .300 | .737 | 2.0 | **5.0** | 1.0 | .2 | **13.2** |
| 2012 | Utah | 4 | 4 | 30.0 | .396 | .267 | .714 | 1.5 | 3.8 | .8 | **.5** | 13.0 |
| 2013 | Atlanta | 6 | 6 | **37.5** | .365 | .200 | .680 | 2.8 | 3.7 | **1.7** | .2 | 11.3 |
| 2014 | Dallas | 7 | 0 | 25.1 | .470 | **.440** | .875 | 2.4 | 3.9 | .3 | .3 | 11.4 |
| 2015 | Dallas | 4 | 0 | 18.5 | .348 | .000 | **.889** | 2.0 | 1.0 | .5 | .0 | 6.0 |
| 2016 | Dallas | 5 | 0 | 24.2 | **.500** | .308 | .500 | 2.8 | 1.6 | .6 | .0 | 7.8 |
| Career | | 64 | 31 | 23.7 | .450 | .257 | .708 | 1.9 | 2.6 | .8 | .2 | 9.1 |

== Personal life ==
Harris reportedly owns over 400 pairs of sneakers. He credits former teammate Keyon Dooling with helping him improve his wardrobe so he could look "the part of an NBA star". Harris owns the Guinness World Record for "fastest man with a basketball," running the length of the court in 3.9 seconds. In 2009, Harris received the NBA's Community Assist Award for his work with his charitable foundation "34 Ways to Assist".

In 2013, Harris married former Fear Factor contestant (2004) and Playboy Cyber Club model, Meghan Allen. They have 2 children. Harris and his children are converts to Catholicism.

In October 2017, Harris was granted leave from the Mavericks following the death of his brother.
