= Trenton Hassell =

American basketball player (born 1979)

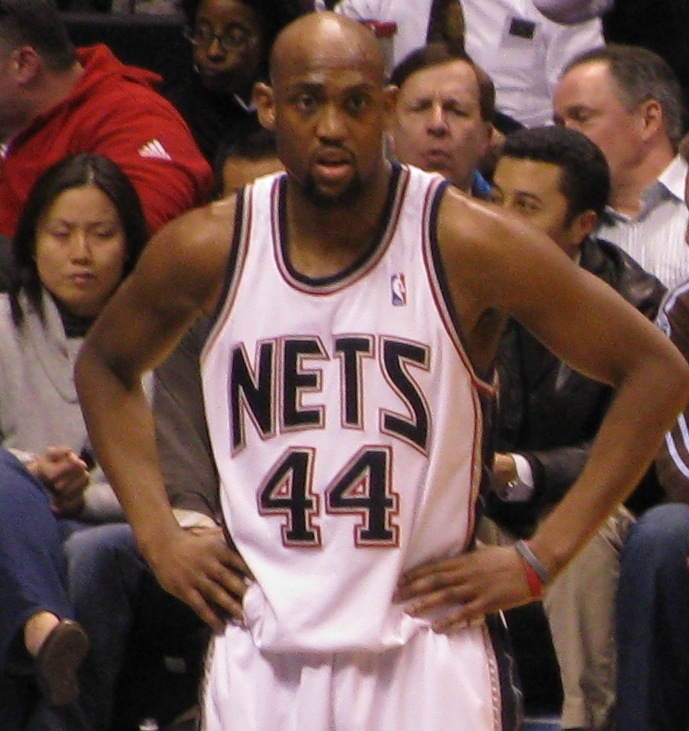
- Hassell with the New Jersey Nets in 2009

Personal information
- Born: March 4, 1979 (age 47) Clarksville, Tennessee, U.S.
- Listed height: 6 ft 6 in (1.98 m)
- Listed weight: 227 lb (103 kg)

Career information
- High school: Clarksville (Clarksville, Tennessee)
- College: Austin Peay (1997–2001)
- NBA draft: 2001: 2nd round, 30th overall pick
- Drafted by: Chicago Bulls
- Playing career: 2001–2011
- Position: Shooting guard / small forward
- Number: 22, 44, 23

Career history
- 2001–2003: Chicago Bulls
- 2003–2007: Minnesota Timberwolves
- 2007–2008: Dallas Mavericks
- 2008–2010: New Jersey Nets
- 2011: Clarksville Cavaliers

Career highlights
- OVC Player of the Year (2001); 3× First-team All-OVC (1999–2001); No. 44 retired by Austin Peay Governors

Career NBA statistics
- Points: 3,741 (5.8 ppg)
- Rebounds: 1,826 (2.8 rpg)
- Assists: 1,132 (1.8 apg)
- Stats at NBA.com
- Stats at Basketball Reference

Trenton Lavar Hassell (born March 4, 1979) is an American former professional basketball forward. A 6 ft 5 in (1.96 m), 227 lb (103 kg) guard-forward, Hassell was selected by the Chicago Bulls with the 30th overall pick of the 2001 NBA draft.

== Early life and college career ==
Hassell graduated from Clarksville High School in Clarksville, Tennessee, in 1997 and from Austin Peay State University in 2001 with a degree in health and human performance. Among his high school teammates was future NBA player Shawn Marion. He was named as one of the greatest high school basketball players in Tennessee history.

Hassell played three seasons of college basketball with the Austin Peay Governors after redshirting his first year. In January 2002, Austin Peay retired Hassell's college jersey number 44. He was inducted into the Austin Peay Athletics Hall of Fame in 2006.

== Professional playing career ==
During Hassell's rookie season with the Chicago Bulls in 2001–02, he appeared in 78 games, making 47 starts and averaging 8.7 points, 3.3 rebounds and 2.2 assists per game. In Hassell's sophomore season in Chicago, he appeared in all 82 games, making 53 starts and averaging 4.2 point, 3.1 rebounds and 1.8 assists in 24.4 minutes per game.

Hassell was waived by the Bulls on October 23, 2003, and signed by the Minnesota Timberwolves six days later. He was a regular starter with the Wolves and often took the role of defensive specialist, helping the Wolves make the franchise's first appearance in the NBA Western Conference Finals in his first season with the team. Hassell played four seasons in Minnesota, until he was traded to the Dallas Mavericks for Greg Buckner on September 28, 2007.

On February 19, 2008, Hassell was traded from Dallas to the New Jersey Nets along with signed and traded Keith Van Horn, Devin Harris, DeSagana Diop, Maurice Ager, $3 million cash and 2008 and 2010 first round draft picks in exchange for Jason Kidd, Malik Allen and Antoine Wright.

Hassell's final NBA game was played on March 24, 2010, in a 93–79 win over the Sacramento Kings. In his final game, Hassell played for 4 minutes and did not record a single stat.

Hassell joined the Clarksville Cavaliers of the American Basketball Association (ABA) in 2011.

== Coaching career ==
Hassell is the head girls basketball coach at Clarksville Christian School.

== NBA career statistics ==
Legend
GP	Games played	GS	Games started	MPG	Minutes per game
FG%	Field goal percentage	3P%	3-point field goal percentage	FT%	Free throw percentage
RPG	Rebounds per game	APG	Assists per game	SPG	Steals per game
BPG	Blocks per game	PPG	Points per game	**Bold**	Career high

=== Regular season ===
Year	Team	GP	GS	MPG	FG%	3P%	FT%	RPG	APG	SPG	BPG	PPG
2001–02	Chicago	78	47	28.7	.425	**.364**	.763	**3.3**	2.2	**.7**	.6	8.7
2002–03	Chicago	**82**	53	24.4	.367	.325	.745	3.1	1.8	.6	**.7**	4.2
2003–04	Minnesota	81	**74**	28.0	.465	.308	.787	3.2	1.6	.4	**.7**	5.0
2004–05	Minnesota	**82**	51	25.2	.474	.091	.789	2.7	1.6	.4	.4	6.6
2005–06	Minnesota	77	67	**32.6**	.464	.304	.744	2.8	2.6	.6	.4	**9.2**
2006–07	Minnesota	76	68	29.3	**.490**	.240	.783	3.2	**2.7**	.3	.3	6.7
2007–08	Dallas	37	6	12.5	.463	.250	.500	1.2	.7	.2	.0	2.1
2007–08	New Jersey	26	0	11.9	.364	.200	.750	1.5	.6	.2	.1	1.8
2008–09	New Jersey	53	31	20.6	.450	.250	**.800**	2.8	1.0	.4	.3	3.7
2009–10	New Jersey	52	31	21.3	.411	.000	.754	2.9	1.0	.3	.2	4.5
Career		644	428	25.3	.445	.318	.765	2.8	1.8	.4	.4	5.8

=== Playoffs ===
Year	Team	GP	GS	MPG	FG%	3P%	FT%	RPG	APG	SPG	BPG	PPG
2004	Minnesota	18	18	26.2	.521	.500	.813	2.4	1.5	.6	.4	7.7
Career		18	18	26.2	.521	.500	.813	2.4	1.5	.6	.4	7.7
