= 2010–11 New Jersey Nets season =

NBA professional basketball team season

- Head coach: Avery Johnson
- Owners: Mikhail Prokhorov
- Arena: Prudential Center

Results
- Record: 24–58 (.293)
- Place: Division: 4th (Atlantic); Conference: 12th (Eastern)
- Playoff finish: Did not qualify
- Stats at Basketball Reference

Local media
- Television: YES Network, WWOR
- Radio: WFAN

The 2010–11 New Jersey Nets season was the 44th season of the franchise, 35th in the National Basketball Association (NBA). This was the franchise's first season in the Prudential Center. Despite a slightly improved record, the Nets missed the playoffs for the fourth consecutive year.

== Key dates ==
- June 10: Avery Johnson becomes the Nets' head coach.
- June 24: The 2010 NBA draft took place in New York City.
- July 1: The free agency period started.
- October 27: New Jersey Nets play first regular season game at Prudential Center by defeating the Detroit Pistons.

== Draft picks ==
Round	Pick	Player	Position	Nationality	College
1	3	Derrick Favors	Power forward	United States	Georgia Tech
1	24	Damion James	Small forward	United States	Texas

== Roster ==
2010–11 New Jersey Nets roster
Players

Pos.	No.	Player	Height	Weight	DOB	From
PG	2	Jordan Farmar	6 ft 2 in (1.88 m)	180 lb (82 kg)	1986-11-30	UCLA
C	50	Dan Gadzuric	6 ft 11 in (2.11 m)	240 lb (109 kg)	1978-02-02	UCLA
PG	0	Sundiata Gaines	6 ft 1 in (1.85 m)	195 lb (88 kg)	1986-04-18	Georgia
SG	26	Stephen Graham	6 ft 6 in (1.98 m)	215 lb (98 kg)	1982-06-11	Oklahoma State
PF	43	Kris Humphries	6 ft 9 in (2.06 m)	235 lb (107 kg)	1985-02-06	Minnesota
SF	10	Damion James	6 ft 7 in (2.01 m)	225 lb (102 kg)	1987-10-07	Texas
C	11	Brook Lopez	7 ft 0 in (2.13 m)	275 lb (125 kg)	1988-04-01	Stanford
SG	22	Anthony Morrow	6 ft 5 in (1.96 m)	210 lb (95 kg)	1985-09-27	Georgia Tech
SF	21	Travis Outlaw	6 ft 9 in (2.06 m)	208 lb (94 kg)	1984-09-18	Starkville (HS)
C	27	Johan Petro	7 ft 0 in (2.13 m)	247 lb (112 kg)	1986-01-27	France
PG	18	Ben Uzoh	6 ft 3 in (1.91 m)	205 lb (93 kg)	1988-03-18	Tulsa
SG	20	Sasha Vujačić	6 ft 7 in (2.01 m)	205 lb (93 kg)	1984-03-08	Slovenia
SG	6	Mario West	6 ft 5 in (1.96 m)	210 lb (95 kg)	1984-06-19	Georgia Tech
PG	8	Deron Williams	6 ft 3 in (1.91 m)	200 lb (91 kg)	1984-06-26	Illinois
PF	34	Brandan Wright	6 ft 10 in (2.08 m)	210 lb (95 kg)	1987-10-05	North Carolina

Coaches
Head coach
- Avery Johnson

Legend
- (DP) Unsigned draft pick
- (FA) Free agent
- (S) Suspended
- Injured

Roster

== Pre-season ==
=== Game log ===
2010 pre-season game log
Pre-season: 3–5 (home: 2–2; road: 1–3)

Game	Date	Team	Score	High points	High rebounds	High assists	Location Attendance	Record
1	October 3	Maccabi Haifa	W 108–70	Derrick Favors, Anthony Morrow (14)	Kris Humphries (12)	Terrence Williams (6)	Prudential Center; 5,174	1–0
2	October 5	@ Philadelphia	W 103–96	Brook Lopez (24)	Kris Humphries (9)	Terrence Williams (8)	Roanoke Civic Center; 4,114	2–0
3	October 7	Boston	L 92–96	Brook Lopez (23)	Travis Outlaw (6)	Terrence Williams (5)	Prudential Center; 8,483	2–1
4	October 9	Philadelphia	W 90–89	Brook Lopez (23)	Derrick Favors (10)	Devin Harris (8)	Prudential Center; 6,252	3–1
5	October 13	@ Houston	L 81–91	Brook Lopez (22)	Terrence Williams (8)	Devin Harris (7)	Wukesong Arena; 16,996	3–2
6	October 16	Houston	L 85–95	Brook Lopez (20)	Brook Lopez (9)	Devin Harris (5)	Guangzhou Gymnasium; 16,516	3–3
7	October 19	@ New York	L 111–117	Jordan Farmar (21)	Brook Lopez (8)	Jordan Farmar (5)	Madison Square Garden; 18,895	3–4
8	October 20	@ Boston	L 92–107	Derrick Favors (16)	Kris Humphries (8)	Devin Harris (4)	TD Garden; 18,624	3–5

2010–11 season schedule

== Regular season ==
=== Standings ===
Atlantic Division	W	L	PCT	GB	Home	Road	Div
y-Boston Celtics	56	26	.683	–	33–8	23–18	13–3
x-New York Knicks	42	40	.512	14	23–18	19–22	10–6
x-Philadelphia 76ers	41	41	.500	15	26–15	15–26	9–7
New Jersey Nets	24	58	.293	32	19–22	5–36	3–13
Toronto Raptors	22	60	.268	34	16–25	6–35	5–11

#	Eastern Conference				
#	Team	W	L	PCT	GB
1	z-Chicago Bulls	62	20	.756	–
2	y-Miami Heat	58	24	.707	4
3	y-Boston Celtics	56	26	.683	6
4	x-Orlando Magic	52	30	.634	10
5	x-Atlanta Hawks	44	38	.537	18
6	x-New York Knicks	42	40	.512	20
7	x-Philadelphia 76ers	41	41	.500	21
8	x-Indiana Pacers	37	45	.451	25
9	Milwaukee Bucks	35	47	.427	27
10	Charlotte Bobcats	34	48	.415	28
11	Detroit Pistons	30	52	.366	32
12	New Jersey Nets	24	58	.293	38
13	Washington Wizards	23	59	.280	39
14	Toronto Raptors	22	60	.268	40
15	Cleveland Cavaliers	19	63	.232	43

=== Game log ===
2010–11 game log
Total: 24–58 (Home: 19–22; Road: 5–36)
October: 2–1 (home: 2–1; road: 0–0)

Game	Date	Team	Score	High points	High rebounds	High assists	Location Attendance	Record
1	October 27	Detroit	W 101–98	Brook Lopez (25)	Derrick Favors (10)	Devin Harris (9)	Prudential Center; 15,178	1–0
2	October 29	Sacramento	W 106–100	Brook Lopez (29)	Kris Humphries (8)	Devin Harris (10)	Prudential Center; 13,482	2–0
3	October 31	Miami	L 78–101	Brook Lopez (20)	Derrick Favors (13)	Devin Harris (6)	Prudential Center; 17,086	2–1

November: 4–11 (home: 2–3; road: 2–8)

Game	Date	Team	Score	High points	High rebounds	High assists	Location Attendance	Record
4	November 3	Charlotte	L 83–85	Devin Harris (19)	Derrick Favors (8)	Devin Harris (8)	Prudential Center; 11,778	2–2
5	November 5	@ Orlando	L 90–105	Travis Outlaw (17)	Travis Outlaw (6)	Jordan Farmar (7)	Amway Center; 18.846	2–3
6	November 6	@ Miami	L 89–101	Anthony Morrow (25)	Anthony Morrow, Terrence Williams (7)	Terrence Williams (9)	American Airlines Arena; 19,600	2–4
7	November 9	Cleveland	L 91–93	Travis Outlaw (27)	Troy Murphy (11)	Devin Harris (6)	Prudential Center; 10,188	2–5
8	November 10	@ Cleveland	W 95–87	Devin Harris (31)	Kris Humphries (18)	Devin Harris (9)	Quicken Loans Arena; 20,562	3–5
9	November 13	Orlando	L 90–91	Devin Harris (26)	Travis Outlaw, Kris Humphries (7)	Devin Harris (8)	Prudential Center; 15,086	3–6
10	November 15	@ L.A. Clippers	W 110–96	Brook Lopez (24)	Kris Humphries (12)	Jordan Farmar (12)	Staples Center; 14,516	4–6
11	November 17	@ Utah	L 88–98	Anthony Morrow (24)	Kris Humphries (15)	Devin Harris (8)	EnergySolutions Arena; 19,314	4–7
12	November 19	@ Sacramento	L 81–86	Kris Humphries (18)	Kris Humphries, Brook Lopez (10)	Devin Harris (8)	ARCO Arena; 11,766	4–8
13	November 20	@ Denver	L 103–107	Brook Lopez (20)	Derrick Favors, Kris Humphries, Brook Lopez (8)	Jordan Farmar (5)	Pepsi Center; 16,396	4–9
14	November 23	Atlanta	W 107–101 (OT)	Brook Lopez (32)	Kris Humphries (14)	Devin Harris (9)	Prudential Center; 13,010	5–9
15	November 24	@ Boston	L 83–89	Devin Harris (20)	Kris Humphries (11)	Jordan Farmar (7)	TD Garden; 18,624	5–10
16	November 27	@ Philadelphia	L 86–102	Brook Lopez (25)	Kris Humphries (15)	Devin Harris (6)	Wells Fargo Center; 14,150	5–11
17	November 28	Portland	W 98–96	Devin Harris (25)	Kris Humphries (8)	Devin Harris (8)	Prudential Center; 11,448	6–11
18	November 30	@ New York	L 100–111	Brook Lopez (36)	Kris Humphries (7)	Jordan Farmar (4)	Madison Square Garden; 19,763	6–12

December: 3–12 (home: 2–5; road: 1–7)

Game	Date	Team	Score	High points	High rebounds	High assists	Location Attendance	Record
19	December 1	Oklahoma City	L 120–123 (3OT)	Jordan Farmar, Brook Lopez (28)	Kris Humphries (15)	Jordan Farmar (9)	Prudential Center; 13,108	6–13
20	December 3	@ Charlotte	L 84–91 (OT)	Travis Outlaw (21)	Kris Humphries, Troy Murphy (8)	Jordan Farmar (10)	Time Warner Cable Arena; 12,183	6–14
21	December 5	Boston	L 75–100	Jordan Farmar (16)	Johan Petro (9)	Devin Harris, Damion James (3)	Prudential Center; 16,196	6–15
22	December 7	@ Atlanta	L 101–116	Brook Lopez (24)	Kris Humphries (7)	Devin Harris (13)	Philips Arena; 14,273	6–16
23	December 9	@ Dallas	L 89–102	Brook Lopez (24)	Kris Humphries (13)	Devin Harris, Terrence Williams (4)	American Airlines Center; 19,666	6–17
24	December 12	L.A. Lakers	L 92–99	Brook Lopez (25)	Kris Humphries (11)	Devin Harris (10)	Prudential Center; 16,561	6–18
25	December 14	Philadelphia	L 77–82	Brook Lopez (16)	Derrick Favors, Kris Humphries (13)	Devin Harris (6)	Prudential Center; 10,151	6–19
26	December 16	Washington	W 97–89	Devin Harris (29)	Kris Humphries (17)	Devin Harris (9)	Prudential Center; 10,764	7–19
27	December 17	@ Toronto	L 92–98	Brook Lopez (20)	Kris Humphries (12)	Devin Harris (6)	Air Canada Centre; 14,623	7–20
28	December 19	Atlanta	W 89–82	Devin Harris (22)	Stephen Graham (7)	Devin Harris (8)	Prudential Center; 11,295	8–20
29	December 21	@ Memphis	W 101–94	Brook Lopez (26)	Kris Humphries (15)	Jordan Farmar (6)	FedExForum; 14,113	9–20
30	December 22	@ New Orleans	L 91–105	Devin Harris (21)	Troy Murphy (7)	Devin Harris (8)	New Orleans Arena; 15,423	9–21
31	December 27	Orlando	L 88–104	Devin Harris (24)	Kris Humphries (11)	Devin Harris (6)	Prudential Center; 11,514	9–22
32	December 29	@ Oklahoma City	L 93–114	Devin Harris, Brook Lopez (19)	Kris Humphries (7)	Ben Uzoh (5)	Oklahoma City Arena; 18,203	9–23
33	December 31	@ Chicago	L 81–90	Brook Lopez (19)	Brook Lopez (8)	Devin Harris (9)	United Center; 21,792	9–24

January: 6–10 (home: 6–2; road: 0–8)

Game	Date	Team	Score	High points	High rebounds	High assists	Location Attendance	Record
34	January 1	@ Minnesota	L 88–103	Sasha Vujačić (22)	Kris Humphries (14)	Devin Harris (8)	Target Center; 12,665	9–25
35	January 5	Chicago	W 96–94	Kris Humphries (20)	Kris Humphries (11)	Devin Harris (11)	Prudential Center; 15,025	10–25
36	January 7	@ Washington	L 77–97	Jordan Farmar, Brook Lopez (14)	Stephen Graham (9)	Devin Harris (3)	Verizon Center; 16,017	10–26
37	January 8	Milwaukee	L 92–115	Kris Humphries (22)	Kris Humphries (8)	Jordan Farmar (10)	Prudential Center; 12,898	10–27
38	January 12	@ Phoenix	L 109–118 (OT)	Sasha Vujačić (19)	Travis Outlaw (11)	Devin Harris (15)	US Airways Center; 16,334	10–28
39	January 14	@ L.A. Lakers	L 88–100	Brook Lopez (35)	Kris Humphries (15)	Devin Harris (8)	Staples Center; 18,997	10–29
40	January 15	@ Portland	L 89–96	Brook Lopez (32)	Kris Humphries (10)	Devin Harris (6)	Rose Garden; 20,441	10–30
41	January 17	@ Golden State	L 100–109	Brook Lopez (20)	Kris Humphries (10)	Devin Harris (8)	Oracle Arena; 18,563	10–31
42	January 19	Utah	W 103–95	Brook Lopez (20)	Travis Outlaw (8)	Devin Harris (8)	Prudential Center; 13,251	11–31
43	January 21	Detroit	W 89–74	Brook Lopez (15)	Kris Humphries (12)	Devin Harris (9)	Prudential Center; 13,316	12–31
44	January 22	Dallas	L 86–87	Brook Lopez (24)	Kris Humphries (15)	Devin Harris (11)	Prudential Center; 14,051	12–32
45	January 24	Cleveland	W 103–101	Brook Lopez (28)	Kris Humphries (11)	Devin Harris (10)	Prudential Center; 10,197	13–32
46	January 26	Memphis	W 93–88	Anthony Morrow (19)	Derrick Favors (9)	Devin Harris (9)	Prudential Center; 8,866	14–32
47	January 28	@ Indiana	L 92–124	Brook Lopez (28)	Travis Outlaw (6)	Devin Harris (9)	Conseco Fieldhouse; 11,337	14–33
48	January 29	@ Milwaukee	L 81–91	Brook Lopez (26)	Kris Humphries (10)	Devin Harris (16)	Bradley Center; 17,173	14–34
49	January 31	Denver	W 115–99	Brook Lopez (27)	Kris Humphries (9)	Devin Harris (18)	Prudential Center; 14,039	15–34

February: 2–9 (home: 1–5; road: 1–4)

Game	Date	Team	Score	High points	High rebounds	High assists	Location Attendance	Record
50	February 2	Philadelphia	L 92–106	Devin Harris, Kris Humphries, Brook Lopez (16)	Derrick Favors (11)	Devin Harris (7)	Prudential Center; 10,057	15–35
51	February 4	@ Detroit	L 82–92	Anthony Morrow (22)	Kris Humphries (9)	Devin Harris (13)	The Palace of Auburn Hills; 17,304	15–36
52	February 6	Indiana	L 86–105	Devin Harris, Brook Lopez (13)	Kris Humphries (9)	Devin Harris (7)	Prudential Center; 13,167	15–37
53	February 9	New Orleans	W 103–101 (OT)	Sasha Vujačić (25)	Kris Humphries (15)	Jordan Farmar (11)	Prudential Center; 13,316	16–37
54	February 11	@ Charlotte	W 94–89	Brook Lopez (31)	Kris Humphries (14)	Devin Harris (8)	Time Warner Cable Arena; 15,386	17–37
55	February 12	New York	L 95–105	Devin Harris (22)	Derrick Favors (14)	Sasha Vujačić (4)	Prudential Center; 18,711	17–38
56	February 14	San Antonio	L 85–102	Brook Lopez, Travis Outlaw (11)	Brook Lopez (10)	Jordan Farmar (7)	Prudential Center; 13,433	17–39
57	February 16	@ Boston	L 80–94	Brook Lopez (18)	Derrick Favors (7)	Devin Harris, Sasha Vujačić (5)	TD Garden; 18,624	17–40
All-Star Break
58	February 25	@ San Antonio	L 96–106	Anthony Morrow (25)	Brook Lopez (8)	Deron Williams (12)	AT&T Center; 18,581	17–41
59	February 26	@ Houston	L 108–123	Brook Lopez (21)	Kris Humphries (11)	Deron Williams (17)	Toyota Center; 17,209	17–42
60	February 28	Phoenix	L 103–104 (OT)	Brook Lopez (28)	Kris Humphries (15)	Deron Williams (18)	Prudential Center; 15,836	17–43

March: 6–8 (home: 5–3; road: 1–5)

Game	Date	Team	Score	High points	High rebounds	High assists	Location Attendance	Record
61	March 4	Toronto	W 116–103	Brook Lopez (25)	Kris Humphries (17)	Deron Williams (11)	O2 Arena; 18,689	18–43
62	March 5	Toronto	W 137–136 (3OT)	Brook Lopez (34)	Kris Humphries (17)	Deron Williams (18)	O2 Arena; 18,689	19–43
63	March 9	Golden State	W 94–90	Brook Lopez (26)	Kris Humphries (15)	Jordan Farmar (9)	Prudential Center; 13,513	20–43
64	March 11	L.A. Clippers	W 102–98 (OT)	Jordan Farmar, Brook Lopez (24)	Kris Humphries (20)	Jordan Farmar (7)	Prudential Center; 18,711	21–43
65	March 14	Boston	W 88–79	Brook Lopez (20)	Kris Humphries (15)	Deron Williams (9)	Prudential Center; 18,711	22–43
66	March 17	Chicago	L 73–84	Brook Lopez (22)	Kris Humphries (16)	Deron Williams (11)	Prudential Center; 18,351	22–44
67	March 18	@ Milwaukee	L 95–110	Brook Lopez (25)	Kris Humphries (11)	Deron Williams (9)	Bradley Center; 14,563	22–45
68	March 20	@ Washington	L 92–98	Brook Lopez (21)	Kris Humphries (17)	Jordan Farmar (17)	Verizon Center; 17,761	22–46
69	March 21	Indiana	L 98–102	Brook Lopez (20)	Kris Humphries (14)	Jordan Farmar, Stephen Graham (4)	Prudential Center; 13,792	22–47
70	March 23	@ Cleveland	W 98–94 (OT)	Kris Humphries, Brook Lopez, Sasha Vujačić (18)	Kris Humphries (23)	Jordan Farmar (10)	Quicken Loans Arena; 18,923	23–47
71	March 25	@ Orlando	L 85–95	Anthony Morrow (19)	Kris Humphries (10)	Jordan Farmar (16)	Amway Center; 19,087	23–48
72	March 26	@ Atlanta	L 87–98	Anthony Morrow (25)	Johan Petro (8)	Jordan Farmar (8)	Philips Arena; 17,093	23–49
73	March 29	Houston	L 87–112	Brook Lopez (22)	Kris Humphries (13)	Jordan Farmar (7)	Prudential Center; 13,866	23–50
74	March 30	@ New York	L 116–120	Anthony Morrow (30)	Kris Humphries (14)	Deron Williams (8)	Madison Square Garden; 19,763	23–51

April: 1–7 (home: 1–3; road: 0–4)

Game	Date	Team	Score	High points	High rebounds	High assists	Location Attendance	Record
75	April 1	@ Philadelphia	L 90–115	Brandan Wright (15)	Brandan Wright (11)	Deron Williams (7)	Wells Fargo Center; 16,695	23–52
76	April 3	Miami	L 94–108	Deron Williams (18)	Travis Outlaw (9)	Deron Williams (9)	Prudential Center; 18,711	23–53
77	April 5	Minnesota	W 107–105	Brook Lopez (30)	Brook Lopez (12)	Deron Williams (21)	Prudential Center; 13,461	24–53
78	April 6	@ Detroit	L 109–116	Brook Lopez (39)	Brook Lopez (7)	Jordan Farmar (11)	The Palace of Auburn Hills; 14,554	24–54
79	April 8	New York	L 93–116	Brook Lopez (27)	Jordan Farmar (8)	Jordan Farmar (9)	Prudential Center; 18,023	24–55
80	April 10	@ Toronto	L 92–99	Brook Lopez (35)	Brook Lopez (11)	Jordan Farmar (7)	Air Canada Centre; 17,755	24–56
81	April 11	Charlotte	L 103–105	Brook Lopez (31)	Dan Gadzuric (8)	Jordan Farmar (9)	Prudential Center; 13,853	24–57
82	April 13	@ Chicago	L 92–97	Jordan Farmar (21)	Johan Petro (8)	Jordan Farmar (12)	United Center; 22,420	24–58

2010–11 season schedule

== Player statistics ==
Legend
GP	Games played	GS	Games started	MPG	Minutes per game
FG%	Field goal percentage	3P%	3-point field goal percentage	FT%	Free throw percentage
RPG	Rebounds per game	APG	Assists per game	SPG	Steals per game
BPG	Blocks per game	PPG	Points per game	**Bold**	Career high

=== Season ===
New Jersey Nets statistics
Player	GP	GS	MPG	FG%	3P%	FT%	RPG	APG	SPG	BPG	PPG
Jordan Farmar	73	18	24.6	.392	.359	.820	2.4	5.0	.8	.1	9.6
Derrick Favors*	56	23	19.5	.511	.000	.612	5.3	.4	.3	.7	6.3
Dan Gadzuric	14	5	11.9	.415	.000	.385	3.5	.2	.2	.8	2.8
Sundiata Gaines*	10	0	14.6	.417	.235	.550	2.4	2.5	.9	.0	5.5
Stephen Graham	59	28	16.3	.405	.238	.816	2.1	.7	.2	.0	3.4
Orien Greene*	3	0	1.7	.500	.000	.500	.0	.3	.3	.0	1.0
Devin Harris*	54	54	31.9	.425	.300	.840	2.4	7.6	1.1	.1	15.0
**Kris Humphries**	74	44	27.9	.527	.000	.665	10.4	1.1	.4	1.1	10.0
Damion James	25	9	16.1	.447	.000	.643	3.4	.8	.6	.5	4.4
**Brook Lopez**	82	82	35.2	.492	.000	.787	6.0	1.6	.6	1.5	20.4
**Anthony Morrow**	58	47	32.0	.450	.423	.897	3.0	1.2	.3	.1	13.2
Troy Murphy*	18	4	16.0	.342	.174	.529	4.2	.9	.4	.1	3.6.
**Travis Outlaw**	82	55	28.8	.375	.302	.772	4.0	1.0	.4	.4	9.2
Johan Petro	77	1	11.6	.445	.000	.536	2.8	.6	.4	.4	3.5
Quinton Ross*	36	4	9.8	.441	.000	.357	.8	.3	.1	.2	1.6
Joe Smith*	4	3	6.1	.250	.000	.000	.8	.3	0	0	0.5
Ben Uzoh	42	0	10.4	.424	.375	.589	1.5	1.6	.3	.2	3.8
Sasha Vujačić*	56	17	28.5	.404	.369	.851	3.3	2.3	1.0	.1	11.4
Mario West	6	3	19.3	.429	.250	.600	1.8	1.7	1.2	.0	3.7
**Deron Williams***	12	12	38.0	.349	.271	.793	4.6	12.8	1.2	.2	15.0
Terrence Williams*	10	0	20.6	.397	.333	.500	3.6	3.1	.5	.0	6.7
Brandan Wright*	16	1	11.5	.407	.000	.824	3.0	.4	.5	.4	3.6

* – Stats with the Nets.

== Transactions ==
=== Trades ===
June 24, 2010
Three-team trade
To Atlanta Hawks

- No. 27 pick (Jordan Crawford) (from Nets),
  cash considerations (from Thunder)
To New Jersey Nets

- No. 24 pick (Damion James) (from Hawks)
To Oklahoma City Thunder

- No. 31 pick (Tibor Pleiss) (from Hawks)
June 24, 2010
To New Jersey Nets

- 2012 second-round pick
To Milwaukee Bucks

- (United States) Chris Douglas-Roberts
June 29, 2010
To New Jersey Nets

- (United States) Quinton Ross
To Washington Wizards

- (China) Yi Jianlian
  cash considerations
June 29, 2010
To Golden State Warriors

- 2011 second-round protected pick
To New Jersey Nets

- (United States) Anthony Morrow (sign and trade)
December 15, 2010
To New Jersey Nets

- (Slovenia) Sasha Vujačić
- 2011 first-round pick
- 2012 first-round pick
To Houston Rockets

- (United States) Terrence Williams
To Los Angeles Lakers

- (United States) Joe Smith
February 23, 2011
To New Jersey Nets

- (United States) Deron Williams
- (Netherlands) Dan Gadzuric
- (United States) Brandan Wright
To Golden State Warriors

- (United States) Troy Murphy
- 2012 second-round pick (Draymond Green), (from Nets)
To Utah Jazz

- (United States) Devin Harris
- (United States) Derrick Favors
- Two future first-round picks

=== Free agents ===
==== Additions ====
Player	Signed	Former Team
Jordan Farmar	Signed 3-year contract for $12 Million	Los Angeles Lakers
Johan Petro	Signed 3-year contract for $10 Million	Denver Nuggets
Travis Outlaw	Signed 5-year contract for $35 Million	Los Angeles Clippers
Mario West	Signed 10-day contract	Maine Red Claws

==== Subtractions ====
Player	Reason Left	New Team
Keyon Dooling	Waived	Milwaukee Bucks
Tony Battie	Free agent	Philadelphia 76ers
Quinton Ross	Waived	
