= 2008–09 New Jersey Nets season =

NBA professional basketball team season

- Head coach: Lawrence Frank
- Arena: Izod Center

Results
- Record: 34–48 (.415)
- Place: Division: 3rd (Atlantic); Conference: 11th (Eastern)
- Playoff finish: Did not qualify
- Stats at Basketball Reference

Local media
- Television: YES Network, WWOR
- Radio: WFAN

The 2008–09 New Jersey Nets season was the 42nd season of the franchise, and their 33rd in the National Basketball Association (NBA).

== Key dates ==
- June 26: The 2008 NBA draft took place in New York City.
- July 1: The free agency period started.

== Offseason ==
On June 26, it was announced the Nets had officially traded Richard Jefferson in exchange for Milwaukee Bucks players Yi Jianlian and Bobby Simmons. After missing the playoffs last season and going no further than the Eastern Conference Semi-finals the past five years, the Nets needed to change. Jefferson left after seven years at New Jersey where he ended up as the Nets third all-time leading scorer in franchise history. On July 21, the Nets acquired Orlando Magic guard Keyon Dooling in exchange for cash considerations.

== Draft picks ==
Round	Pick	Player	Position	Nationality	School/club
1	10	Brook Lopez	C	United States	Stanford
1	21	Ryan Anderson	PF	United States	California
2	40	Chris Douglas-Roberts	SG	United States	Memphis

== Roster ==
2008–09 New Jersey Nets roster
Players

Pos.	No.	Player	Height	Weight	DOB	From
G	13	Maurice Ager	6 ft 5 in (1.96 m)	202 lb (92 kg)	1984-02-09	Michigan State
F	20	Ryan Anderson	6 ft 10 in (2.08 m)	240 lb (109 kg)	1988-05-06	California
F/C	2	Josh Boone	6 ft 10 in (2.08 m)	245 lb (111 kg)	1984-11-21	Connecticut
SG	15	Vince Carter	6 ft 6 in (1.98 m)	220 lb (100 kg)	1977-01-26	North Carolina
G	55	Keyon Dooling	6 ft 3 in (1.91 m)	195 lb (88 kg)	1980-05-08	Missouri
G/F	17	Chris Douglas-Roberts	6 ft 7 in (2.01 m)	200 lb (91 kg)	1987-01-08	Memphis
PG	34	Devin Harris	6 ft 3 in (1.91 m)	185 lb (84 kg)	1983-02-27	Wisconsin
G/F	44	Trenton Hassell	6 ft 5 in (1.96 m)	233 lb (106 kg)	1979-03-04	Austin Peay
F	22	Jarvis Hayes	6 ft 8 in (2.03 m)	228 lb (103 kg)	1981-08-09	Georgia
C	11	Brook Lopez	7 ft 0 in (2.13 m)	260 lb (118 kg)	1988-04-01	Stanford
F	14	Eduardo Nájera	6 ft 8 in (2.03 m)	235 lb (107 kg)	1976-07-11	Oklahoma
G/F	21	Bobby Simmons	6 ft 6 in (1.98 m)	230 lb (104 kg)	1980-06-02	DePaul
PF	51	Sean Williams	6 ft 10 in (2.08 m)	235 lb (107 kg)	1986-09-13	Boston College
F/C	9	Yi Jianlian	7 ft 0 in (2.13 m)	238 lb (108 kg)	1987-10-27	China

Coaches
Head coach
- Lawrence Frank
Assistant(s)
- Brian Hill
- Tom Barrise
- Doug Overton
- Rich Dalatri
- Roy Rogers

Legend
- (DP) Unsigned draft pick
- (FA) Free agent
- (S) Suspended
- Injured

== Regular season ==
=== Standings ===
Atlantic Division	W	L	PCT	GB	Home	Road	Div
y-Boston Celtics	62	20	.756	—	35–6	27–14	15–1
x-Philadelphia 76ers	41	41	.500	21	24–17	17–24	6–10
New Jersey Nets	34	48	.415	28	19–22	15–26	8–8
Toronto Raptors	33	49	.402	29	18–23	15–26	6–10
New York Knicks	32	50	.390	30	20–21	12–29	5–11

#	Eastern Conference				
#	Team	W	L	PCT	GB
1	z-Cleveland Cavaliers	66	16	.805	—
2	y-Boston Celtics	62	20	.756	4
3	y-Orlando Magic	59	23	.720	7
4	x-Atlanta Hawks	47	35	.573	19
5	x-Miami Heat	43	39	.524	23
6	x-Philadelphia 76ers	41	41	.500	25
7	x-Chicago Bulls	41	41	.500	25
8	x-Detroit Pistons	39	43	.476	27
9	Indiana Pacers	36	46	.439	30
10	Charlotte Bobcats	35	47	.427	31
11	New Jersey Nets	34	48	.415	32
12	Milwaukee Bucks	34	48	.415	32
13	Toronto Raptors	33	49	.402	33
14	New York Knicks	32	50	.390	34
15	Washington Wizards	19	63	.232	47

=== Game log ===
2008–09 game log
October: 1–0 (home: 0–0; road: 1–0)

Game	Date	Team	Score	High points	High rebounds	High assists	Location Attendance	Record
1	October 29	@ Washington	W 95–85	Vince Carter (21)	Brook Lopez (8)	Vince Carter (6)	Verizon Center; 20,173	1–0

November: 8–7 (home: 3–4; road: 5–3)

Game	Date	Team	Score	High points	High rebounds	High assists	Location Attendance	Record
2	November 1	Golden State	L 97–105	Vince Carter (20)	Josh Boone (14)	Keyon Dooling (6)	Izod Center; 17,390	1–1
3	November 4	Phoenix	L 86–114	Vince Carter (19)	Yi Jianlian (8)	Devin Harris (7)	Izod Center; 15,230	1–2
4	November 7	Detroit	W 103–96	Devin Harris (38)	Josh Boone (14)	Vince Carter (7)	Izod Center; 17,767	2–2
5	November 8	@ Indiana	L 80–98	Vince Carter (31)	Yi Jianlian (11)	Keyon Dooling (4)	Conseco Fieldhouse; 14,355	2–3
6	November 10	@ Miami	L 94–99	Yi Jianlian (24)	Yi Jianlian (10)	Yi Jianlian, Vince Carter, Keyon Dooling (4)	American Airlines Arena; 15,028	2–4
7	November 12	Indiana	L 87–98	Vince Carter (28)	Yi Jianlian (8)	Vince Carter (7)	Izod Center; 13,551	2–5
8	November 14	Atlanta	W 115–108	Devin Harris (30)	Brook Lopez (9)	Devin Harris (8)	Izod Center; 15,309	3–5
9	November 15	@ Atlanta	W 119–107	Devin Harris (33)	Brook Lopez (7)	Devin Harris (10)	Philips Arena; 18,729	4–5
10	November 18	Cleveland	L 82–106	Devin Harris (23)	Brook Lopez (13)	Vince Carter (6)	Izod Center; 16,911	4–6
11	November 21	@ Toronto	W 129–127 (OT)	Vince Carter (39)	Vince Carter (9)	Vince Carter (6)	Air Canada Centre; 19,800	5–6
12	November 22	L.A. Clippers	W 112–95	Yi Jianlian (27)	Brook Lopez (10)	Devin Harris (10)	Izod Center; 17,677	6–6
13	November 25	@ L.A. Lakers	L 93–120	Devin Harris (21)	Brook Lopez (10)	Devin Harris (6)	Staples Center; 18,997	6–7
14	November 26	@ Sacramento	W 116–114 (OT)	Vince Carter (25)	Brook Lopez, Ryan Anderson (8)	Devin Harris (7)	ARCO Arena; 11,650	7–7
15	November 29	@ Utah	W 105–88	Devin Harris (34)	Brook Lopez (8)	Devin Harris (6)	EnergySolutions Arena; 19,911	8–7
16	November 30	@ Phoenix	W 117–109	Devin Harris (47)	Devin Harris, Brook Lopez (7)	Devin Harris (8)	US Airways Center; 18,422	9–7

December: 6–10 (home: 2–8; road: 4–2)

Game	Date	Team	Score	High points	High rebounds	High assists	Location Attendance	Record
17	December 2	Washington	L 88–108	Devin Harris (18)	Brook Lopez (9)	Chris Douglas-Roberts, Yi Jianlian, Devin Harris, Vince Carter, Keyon Dooling (2)	Izod Center; 15,062	9–8
18	December 5	Minnesota	W 113–84	Vince Carter (18)	Brook Lopez (10)	Devin Harris (5)	Izod Center; 15,364	10–8
19	December 6	@ Philadelphia	W 95–84	Devin Harris (27)	Vince Carter, Brook Lopez (11)	Devin Harris, Vince Carter (8)	Wachovia Center; 13,096	11–8
20	December 10	New York	L 109–121	Devin Harris (32)	Vince Carter (7)	Devin Harris (7)	Izod Center; 16,722	11–9
21	December 12	Toronto	L 79–101	Yi Jianlian, Devin Harris (14)	Brook Lopez (8)	Devin Harris (5)	Izod Center; 13,926	11–10
22	December 13	@ Chicago	L 104–113	Vince Carter (39)	Bobby Simmons (10)	Devin Harris (7)	United Center; 21,751	11–11
23	December 15	@ Toronto	W 94–87	Ryan Anderson (21)	Vince Carter (10)	Vince Carter, Devin Harris (5)	Air Canada Centre; 18,561	12–11
24	December 17	Utah	L 92–103	Vince Carter (32)	Yi Jianlian, Brook Lopez (7)	Devin Harris (11)	Izod Center; 12,542	12–12
25	December 19	Dallas	W 121–97	Devin Harris (41)	Vince Carter, Yi Jianlian (10)	Devin Harris (13)	Izod Center; 9,889	13–12
26	December 20	Miami	L 103–106	Brook Lopez (22)	Brook Lopez (13)	Devin Harris (9)	Izod Center; 14,139	13–13
27	December 22	Houston	L 91–114	Keyon Dooling (17)	Brook Lopez (9)	Keyon Dooling (5)	Izod Center; 16,303	13–14
28	December 23	@ Indiana	W 108–107	Vince Carter (38)	Vince Carter, Brook Lopez (8)	Devin Harris (11)	Conseco Fieldhouse; 11,272	14–14
29	December 26	Charlotte	L 87–95	Vince Carter (19)	Brook Lopez (7)	Keyon Dooling (6)	Izod Center; 16,852	14–15
30	December 27	@ Charlotte	W 114–103 (OT)	Vince Carter (28)	Brook Lopez (13)	Vince Carter, Keyon Dooling (6)	Time Warner Cable Arena; 15,837	15–15
31	December 29	Chicago	L 87–100	Vince Carter (31)	Bobby Simmons (10)	Devin Harris, Bobby Simmons (5)	Izod Center; 18,786	15–16
32	December 31	@ Detroit	L 75–83	Brook Lopez (23)	Brook Lopez (12)	Devin Harris (9)	The Palace of Auburn Hills; 22,076	15–17

January: 6–10 (home: 4–3; road: 2–7)

Game	Date	Team	Score	High points	High rebounds	High assists	Location Attendance	Record
33	January 2	Atlanta	W 93–91 (OT)	Devin Harris (26)	Brook Lopez (11)	Devin Harris (11)	Izod Center; 16,851	16–17
34	January 3	@ Miami	L 96–101 (OT)	Keyon Dooling (23)	Vince Carter, Bobby Simmons (9)	Keyon Dooling (7)	American Airlines Arena; 19,600	16–18
35	January 5	Sacramento	W 98–90	Vince Carter (29)	Yi Jianlian (13)	Vince Carter, Devin Harris (7)	Izod Center; 12,314	17–18
36	January 7	Memphis	W 100–89	Vince Carter (25)	Jarvis Hayes, Brook Lopez (8)	Vince Carter (12)	Izod Center; 11,552	18–18
37	January 9	@ Milwaukee	L 102–104	Vince Carter (23)	Vince Carter (9)	Vince Carter (14)	Bradley Center; 15,768	18–19
38	January 12	Oklahoma City	W 103–99 (OT)	Brook Lopez (31)	Brook Lopez (13)	Devin Harris (8)	Izod Center; 12,972	19–19
39	January 14	@ Boston	L 86–118	Devin Harris (17)	Brook Lopez (8)	Devin Harris (3)	TD Banknorth Garden; 18,624	19–20
40	January 15	Portland	L 99–105	Devin Harris (23)	Vince Carter (9)	Devin Harris (8)	Izod Center; 13,824	19–21
41	January 17	Boston	L 85–105	Brook Lopez (28)	Brook Lopez (10)	Keyon Dooling (8)	Izod Center; 17,578	19–22
42	January 21	@ New Orleans	L 92–102	Vince Carter (20)	Ryan Anderson (10)	Keyon Dooling, Devin Harris (6)	New Orleans Arena; 14,748	19–23
43	January 23	@ San Antonio	L 91–94	Devin Harris (27)	Brook Lopez (8)	Vince Carter (6)	AT&T Center; 18,797	19–24
44	January 24	@ Memphis	W 99–88	Vince Carter (23)	Ryan Anderson (9)	Devin Harris (8)	FedExForum; 12,817	20–24
45	January 26	@ Oklahoma City	L 85–94	Brook Lopez (18)	Brook Lopez (7)	Devin Harris, Keyon Dooling (6)	Ford Center; 18,264	20–25
46	January 28	Toronto	L 106–107	Vince Carter (27)	Vince Carter (10)	Devin Harris (10)	Izod Center; 10,138	20–26
47	January 30	@ Atlanta	L 88–105	Devin Harris (20)	Jarvis Hayes (7)	Devin Harris (6)	Philips Arena; 17,561	20–27
48	January 31	@ Philadelphia	W 85–83	Brook Lopez (24)	Brook Lopez (17)	Devin Harris (6)	Wachovia Center; 17,783	21–27

February: 5–5 (home: 4–2; road: 1–3)

Game	Date	Team	Score	High points	High rebounds	High assists	Location Attendance	Record
49	February 3	Milwaukee	W 99–85	Brook Lopez (22)	Brook Lopez (12)	Vince Carter (12)	Izod Center; 10,102	22–27
50	February 4	@ Washington	W 115–88	Devin Harris (26)	Brook Lopez (12)	Devin Harris (7)	Verizon Center; 12,602	23–27
51	February 7	Denver	W 114–70	Devin Harris (28)	Ryan Anderson (12)	Vince Carter (8)	Izod Center; 17,697	24–27
52	February 8	@ Orlando	L 84–101	Devin Harris (28)	Brook Lopez (12)	Devin Harris (12)	Amway Arena; 16,533	24–28
53	February 10	San Antonio	L 93–108	Vince Carter (25)	Devin Harris (7)	Vince Carter, Devin Harris (5)	Izod Center; 13,301	24–29
54	February 17	@ Houston	L 88–114	Vince Carter (30)	Brook Lopez (9)	Chris Douglas-Roberts, Devin Harris (4)	Toyota Center; 14,921	24–30
55	February 18	@ Dallas	L 98–113	Devin Harris (18)	Brook Lopez (7)	Devin Harris (7)	American Airlines Center; 19,878	24–31
56	February 20	Washington	L 96–107	Devin Harris (26)	Ryan Anderson (9)	Devin Harris (10)	Izod Center; 15,113	24–32
57	February 23	Philadelphia	W 98–96	Devin Harris (39)	Yi Jianlian (6)	Devin Harris (8)	Izod Center; 13,236	25–32
58	February 25	Chicago	W 111–99	Devin Harris (42)	Vince Carter, Yi Jianlian (9)	Vince Carter (7)	Izod Center; 14,075	26–32

March: 4–12 (home: 2–5; road: 2–7)

Game	Date	Team	Score	High points	High rebounds	High assists	Location Attendance	Record
59	March 1	New Orleans	L 96–99	Vince Carter, Devin Harris (26)	Brook Lopez (12)	Devin Harris (14)	Izod Center; 15,509	26–33
60	March 3	@ Milwaukee	W 99–95	Brook Lopez (24)	Brook Lopez (12)	Devin Harris (11)	Bradley Center; 13,967	27–33
61	March 4	Boston	L 111–115	Vince Carter (34)	Brook Lopez (5)	Devin Harris (11)	Izod Center; 15,791	27–34
62	March 6	@ Orlando	L 102–105	Devin Harris (25)	Jarvis Hayes, Brook Lopez, Yi Jianlian (6)	Devin Harris (9)	Amway Arena; 17,461	27–35
63	March 8	New York	W 106–101	Devin Harris (35)	Vince Carter (9)	Devin Harris (10)	Izod Center; 18,846	28–35
64	March 11	@ Golden State	L 112–116	Devin Harris (31)	Devin Harris (7)	Devin Harris (12)	Oracle Arena; 18,203	28–36
65	March 13	@ Portland	L 100–109	Devin Harris (27)	Devin Harris (7)	Devin Harris (8)	Rose Garden; 20,634	28–37
66	March 15	@ L.A. Clippers	L 105–107	Vince Carter (41)	Vince Carter, Trenton Hassell (7)	Vince Carter (6)	Staples Center; 18,266	28–38
67	March 16	@ Denver	L 96–121	Vince Carter (32)	Brook Lopez (6)	Keyon Dooling (6)	Pepsi Center; 16,223	28–39
68	March 18	@ New York	W 115–89	Vince Carter (29)	Trenton Hassell (9)	Brook Lopez, Keyon Dooling (8)	Madison Square Garden; 19,763	29–39
69	March 20	Miami	W 96–88	Jarvis Hayes, Chris Douglas-Roberts (18)	Vince Carter (9)	Vince Carter, Keyon Dooling (8)	Izod Center; 18,108	30–39
70	March 22	Cleveland	L 88–96	Vince Carter (25)	Vince Carter (9)	Vince Carter (5)	Izod Center; 18,348	30–40
71	March 25	@ Cleveland	L 87–98	Vince Carter (20)	Brook Lopez (10)	Keyon Dooling (10)	Quicken Loans Arena; 20,562	30–41
72	March 27	L.A. Lakers	L 95–103	Vince Carter (20)	Brook Lopez (10)	Devin Harris (14)	Izod Center; 19,990	30–42
73	March 29	@ Minnesota	L 99–108	Vince Carter (36)	Brook Lopez (9)	Devin Harris (5)	Target Center; 16,539	30–43
74	March 30	Milwaukee	L 78–107	Chris Douglas-Roberts (14)	Brook Lopez (10)	Chris Douglas-Roberts (4)	Izod Center; 12,205	30–44

April : 4–4 (home: 4–0; road: 0–4)

Game	Date	Team	Score	High points	High rebounds	High assists	Location Attendance	Record
75	April 1	Detroit	W 111–98	Keyon Dooling (23)	Brook Lopez, Vince Carter, Josh Boone (7)	Devin Harris (11)	Izod Center; 15,105	31–44
76	April 4	@ Chicago	L 94–103	Brook Lopez (20)	Brook Lopez, Ryan Anderson (10)	Keyon Dooling (8)	United Center; 21,424	31–45
77	April 5	Philadelphia	W 96–67	Vince Carter (15)	Brook Lopez (8)	Devin Harris (7)	Izod Center; 13,345	32–45
78	April 8	@ Boston	L 104–106	Vince Carter (33)	Vince Carter (12)	Keyon Dooling (6)	TD Banknorth Garden; 18,624	32–46
79	April 10	@ Detroit	L 93–100	Ryan Anderson (20)	Brook Lopez (7)	Vince Carter (10)	The Palace of Auburn Hills; 22,076	32–47
80	April 11	Orlando	W 103–93	Vince Carter (27)	Brook Lopez (11)	Keyon Dooling (10)	Izod Center; 17,123	33–47
81	April 13	Charlotte	W 91–87	Brook Lopez (18)	Brook Lopez (20)	Vince Carter (5)	Izod Center; 14,519	34–47
82	April 15	@ New York	L 73–102	Chris Douglas-Roberts (18)	Brook Lopez (11)	Keyon Dooling (5)	Madison Square Garden; 19,763	34–48

2015–16 season schedule

== Player statistics ==
Legend
GP	Games played	GS	Games started	MPG	Minutes per game
FG%	Field-goal percentage	3P%	3-point field-goal percentage	FT%	Free-throw percentage
RPG	Rebounds per game	APG	Assists per game	SPG	Steals per game
BPG	Blocks per game	PPG	Points per game	Source:

=== Season ===
New Jersey Nets statistics
Player	GP	GS	MPG	FG%	3P%	FT%	RPG	APG	SPG	BPG	PPG
Maurice Ager	20	0	4.9	.349	.000	.500	0.5	0.2	0.05	0.10	1.7
Ryan Anderson	66	30	19.9	.393	.365	.845	4.7	0.8	0.67	0.30	7.4
Josh Boone	62	7	16.0	.528	.000	.376	4.2	0.5	0.35	0.77	4.2
Vince Carter	80	80	36.8	.437	.385	.817	5.1	4.7	1.03	0.48	20.8
Keyon Dooling	77	18	26.9	.436	.421	.825	2.0	3.5	0.92	0.10	9.7
Chris Douglas-Roberts	44	3	13.3	.460	.250	.823	1.1	1.2	0.27	0.16	4.9
Devin Harris	69	69	36.1	.438	.291	.820	3.3	6.9	1.65	0.19	21.3
Trenton Hassell	53	31	20.6	.450	.250	.800	2.8	1.0	0.40	0.30	3.7
Jarvis Hayes	74	1	24.8	.445	.385	.692	3.6	0.7	0.70	0.09	8.7
Brook Lopez	82	75	30.5	.531	.000	.793	8.1	1.0	0.54	1.84	13.0
Eduardo Nájera	27	0	11.8	.446	.200	.364	2.5	0.7	0.37	0.15	2.9
Bobby Simmons	71	44	24.4	.449	.447	.741	3.9	1.3	0.70	0.14	7.8
Stromile Swift*	6	0	10.7	.600	.000	.455	2.2	0.2	0.00	0.33	3.8
Sean Williams	33	0	11.1	.417	.000	.625	2.4	0.4	0.21	0.88	2.4
Yi Jianlian	61	52	23.3	.382	.343	.772	5.3	1.0	0.48	0.59	8.6

*Statistics with the New Jersey Nets

== Transactions ==
=== Trades ===
June 28, 2008	To New Jersey Nets Bobby Simmons; Yi Jianlian	To Milwaukee Bucks Richard Jefferson
July 11, 2008	To New Jersey Nets Keyon Dooling	To Orlando Magic Cash considerations
July 22, 2008	To New Jersey Nets Conditional first round pick	To Golden State Warriors Marcus Williams

=== Additions ===
Date	Player	Former team	Ref
July 16, 2008	Jarvis Hayes	Detroit Pistons	
July 16, 2008	Eduardo Nájera	Denver Nuggets	

=== Subtractions ===
Date	Player	New team	Ref
July 29, 2008	Nenad Krstić	Triumph Lyubertsy	
August 15, 2008	Boštjan Nachbar	Dynamo Moscow	
