= Brook Lopez =

American basketball player (born 1988)

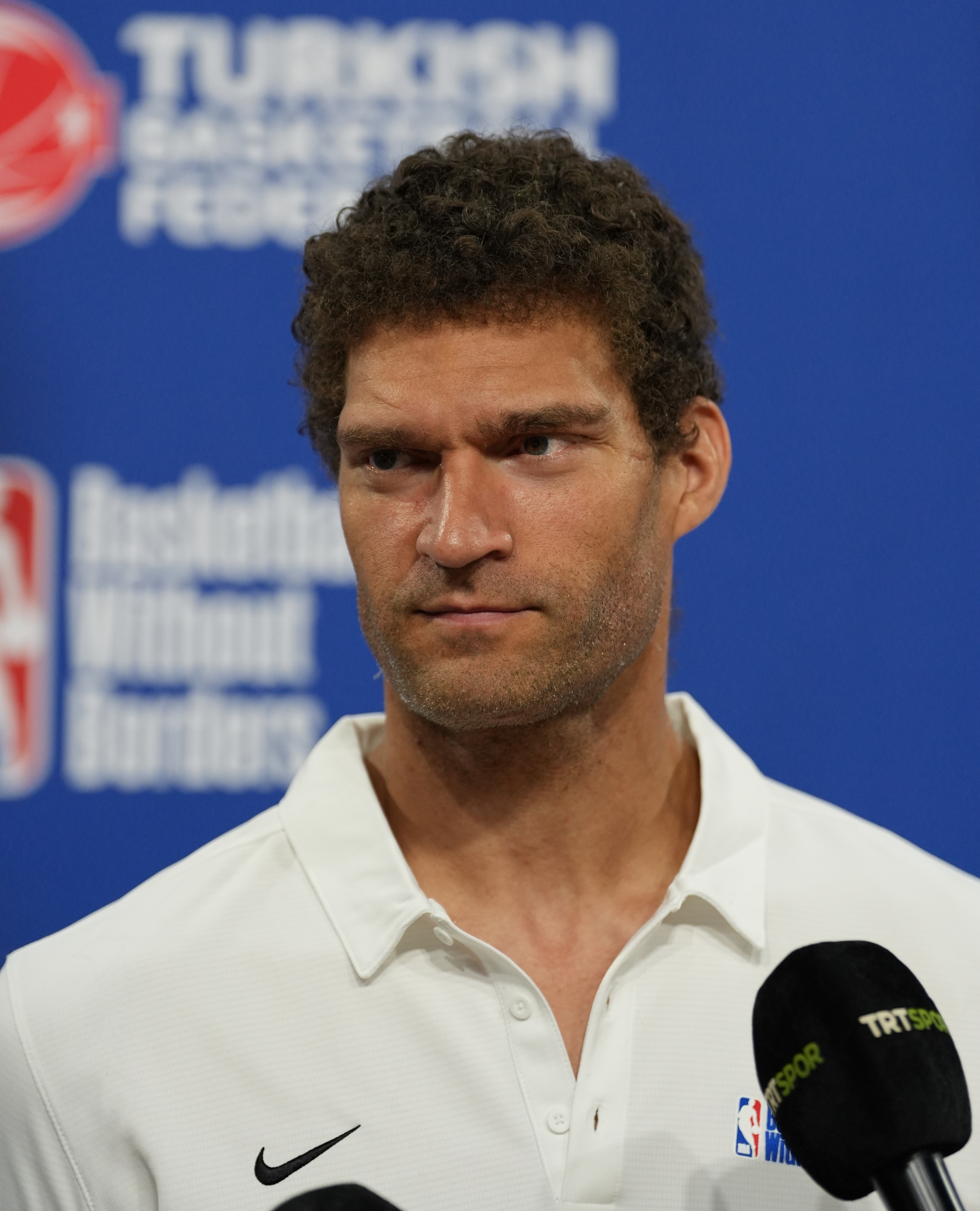
- Lopez in 2026

No. 11 – Los Angeles Clippers
- Position: Center
- League: NBA

Personal information
- Born: April 1, 1988 (age 38) Los Angeles, California, U.S.
- Listed height: 7 ft 1 in (2.16 m)
- Listed weight: 282 lb (128 kg)

Career information
- High school: San Joaquin Memorial (Fresno, California)
- College: Stanford (2006–2008)
- NBA draft: 2008: 1st round, 10th overall pick
- Drafted by: New Jersey Nets
- Playing career: 2008–present

Career history
- 2008–2017: New Jersey / Brooklyn Nets
- 2017–2018: Los Angeles Lakers
- 2018–2025: Milwaukee Bucks
- 2025–present: Los Angeles Clippers

Career highlights
- NBA champion (2021); NBA All-Star (2013); NBA All-Defensive First Team (2023); NBA All-Defensive Second Team (2020); NBA All-Rookie First Team (2009); NBA Cup champion (2024); Third-team All-American – AP, NABC (2008); First-team All-Pac-10 (2008); Third-team Parade All-American (2006); McDonald's All-American (2006)
- Stats at NBA.com
- Stats at Basketball Reference

Brook Robert Lopez (born April 1, 1988) is an American professional basketball player for the Los Angeles Clippers of the National Basketball Association (NBA). Nicknamed "Splash Mountain", he was named an NBA All-Star as a member of the Brooklyn Nets, and was voted twice to the NBA All-Defensive Team while with the Milwaukee Bucks. He won an NBA championship with Milwaukee in 2021.

Lopez played two years of college basketball for the Stanford Cardinal. He was selected as the 10th overall pick in the 2008 NBA draft by the then-New Jersey Nets. He played for the Nets for nine seasons and is the franchise's all-time leading scorer. Lopez played one season with the Los Angeles Lakers before joining Milwaukee. His twin brother, Robin Lopez, played in the NBA for 16 seasons.

== Early life ==
Lopez was born in Panorama City, California (his family lived in Granada Hills at the time), to Deborah Ledford and his now deceased father, Heriberto Lopez, a native of Cuba. Lopez moved from Los Angeles to Oak Harbor, Washington, while in second grade to be closer to his older brother, Alex, who was playing basketball at the University of Washington. One year later, he moved to Fresno, California, where he would spend the rest of his childhood and then attended San Joaquin Memorial High School. While at San Joaquin High School he played basketball with his twin brother, Robin Lopez, and Quincy Pondexter, both fellow future National Basketball Association (NBA) players. As a 7-foot (2.1 m)-tall, 235-pound (107 kg) senior in high school, he averaged 13.6 points, 7.2 rebounds and 2.5 blocks. Both teammates played with Lopez on their successful AAU team, the Elite Basketball Organization (EBO), along with Derrick Jasper and Tre'Von Willis, both of UNLV. Brook, along with his brother, Robin, committed to Stanford University early in 2005. Lopez's maternal grandfather played in the National Industrial Basketball League for the Milwaukee Allen-Bradleys.

== College career ==
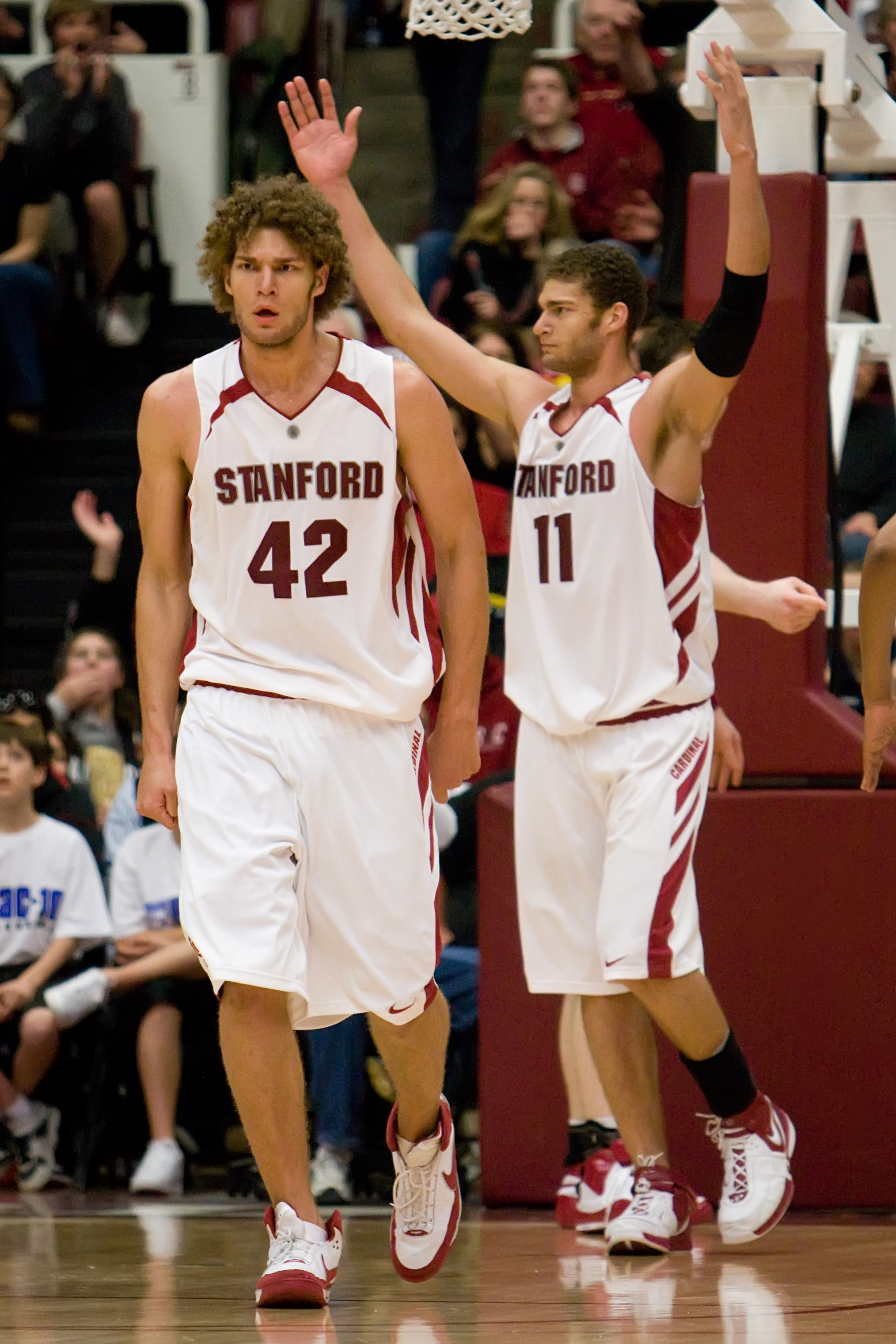
Lopez (right) with his twin brother Robin in college

The 2006–07 season was Lopez's first season at Stanford University. He was an All-Pac-10 Honorable Mention and was named to the All-Pac-10 Freshman Team. He averaged 12.6 points and 6.0 rebounds over the course of his freshman season. The following season, he averaged 19.3 points, 8.2 rebounds, 1.5 assists and 2.1 blocks per game. In the second round of the 2008 NCAA tournament, Lopez hit the game-winning shot at the buzzer against the Marquette Golden Eagles for an 82–81 overtime victory. He was named to the All-Pac-10 First Team and an All-American Third Team his sophomore season. On March 31, 2008, both Lopez brothers declared for the 2008 NBA draft.

== Professional career ==
=== New Jersey / Brooklyn Nets (2008–2017) ===
==== All-Rookie honors and increasing averages (2008–2011) ====
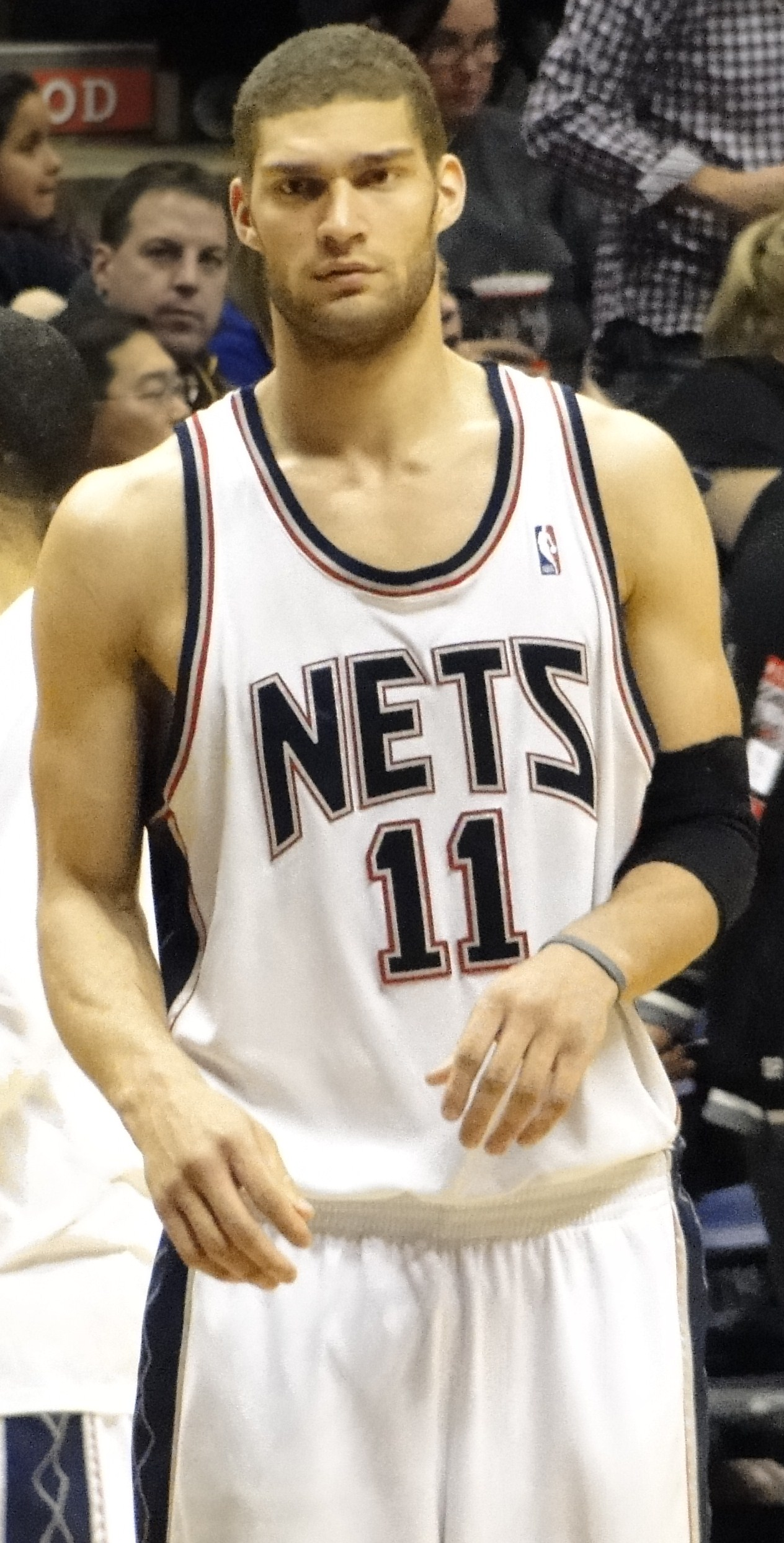
Lopez with the New Jersey Nets in 2010

Lopez was drafted by the New Jersey Nets 10th overall. His twin brother, Robin, was drafted 15th overall by the Phoenix Suns. Lopez played in his first NBA game on October 29, 2008, in a 95-85 Nets win. In his first game, Lopez came off the bench and had 8 points, 8 rebounds, and 2 blocks in 25 minutes. Lopez began starting for the Nets after an injury took Josh Boone out of the line-up, and afterwards he started putting up solid numbers for the team. Lopez was selected to compete in the 2009 NBA All-Star Weekend Rookie Challenge. For his rookie season Lopez averaged 13.0 points, 8.1 rebounds, and 1.9 blocks per game, playing in all 82 games of the regular season. He ranked 4th in the NBA in total blocks with 154 and 9th in blocks per game with 1.9, which was first among rookies. He finished third in the NBA Rookie of the Year voting and was named to the All-Rookie first team. He was selected as NBA Rookie of the Month twice in the months of January and February. The Nets finished at 34–48, failing to qualify for the playoffs.

The Nets started the 2009–10 season going 0–18, the worst start to a season in NBA history. Because of their start the Nets fired head coach Lawrence Frank. The Nets won their first game on December 4, 2009, against the Charlotte Bobcats 97–91. Lopez contributed in the win with 31 points and 14 rebounds. In his second season, Lopez established career bests in minutes played per game (36.9) and rebounds per game (8.6) while averaging 18.8 points per game. Lopez started in all the Nets' games in the 2009–10 season. Despite his improving play, however, the Nets struggled all season, finishing with one of the worst records in NBA history at 12–70; only three more wins than the 1972–73 Philadelphia 76ers.

For his third NBA season, Lopez for the third consecutive year played in all 82 regular season games. Lopez struggled to rebound the ball during the season and was criticized by head coach Avery Johnson because of his rebounding. During the season the Nets traded for all-star point guard Deron Williams. The move helped Lopez out significantly, as he saw his scoring average increase. During the season Lopez averaged 20.4 points, 6.0 rebounds, 1.6 assists, and 1.5 blocks. The Nets finished at 24–58, once again missing the playoffs.

==== All-Star selection and injury-plagued seasons (2011–2014) ====
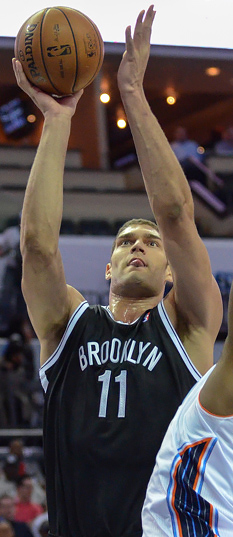
Lopez with the Brooklyn Nets in 2013

In the preseason of the lockout-shortened 2011–2012 campaign, Lopez broke his right foot and missed the first 32 games of the regular season. In his season debut against the Milwaukee Bucks, Lopez finished with nine points and two rebounds. In only his third game back, he scored a season-high 38 points in a road win over the Dallas Mavericks. Five games after his season debut, Lopez injured his right ankle in a win over the Charlotte Bobcats. Due to the Nets' poor record, they decided to shut down Lopez for the remainder of the 2011–2012 season. In the little time that Lopez played he averaged 19.2 points and a career–low in rebounds with 3.6.

On July 11, 2012, the Nets re-signed Lopez to a four-year, $61 million contract extension. Lopez got off to a hot start in 2012, scoring 27 points in the season opener against the Toronto Raptors. He followed that performance by scoring 20 or more points in seven of the next twelve games, before injuring his ankle in a win over the Boston Celtics on November 28. The Nets struggled to a 2–5 record without Lopez before he returned on December 14. He began to play well again in late December, posting three straight 20–point, 10–rebound games, including a 35-point, 11 rebound performance in a win over the Cleveland Cavaliers on December 29.

On January 30, 2013, NBA Commissioner David Stern selected Lopez to play in the 2013 NBA All-Star Game, his first All-Star appearance, replacing Rajon Rondo who had suffered a season-ending ACL injury. In the game, Lopez finished the game with five rebounds, three assists, and three points in 11 minutes; all of his points came from the free throw line. On March 20, the Nets were on the road playing the Dallas Mavericks when Lopez had 38 points and 11 rebounds in a 113-97 Nets win. His 38-point total was only one point away from his career–high of 39. At the end of the 2012–13 season, Lopez averaged 19.4 points and 6.9 rebounds, as he also set a new career high in blocks with 2.1. At the end of the season, the Nets won 49 games and were the fourth seed in the east. Lopez played all seven of the Nets playoff games, averaging 22.3 points and 7.4 rebounds. The Nets were eliminated in a seven-game, first-round series by the Chicago Bulls.

In a season-opening loss at the Cleveland Cavaliers, Lopez scored 21 points and grabbed five rebounds. On November 15, 2013, Lopez logged 27 points and seven rebounds in an overtime win over the Phoenix Suns. On December 7, Lopez had 32 points and seven rebounds against the Milwaukee Bucks. On December 20, the Nets announced Lopez was out for the remainder of the season with a foot injury he had suffered the night before against the Philadelphia 76ers. In the 17 games that Lopez played, he averaged 20.7 points 6.0 rebounds, shot 56.3% from the field and 81.7% from the free throw line. This was the first season he didn't manage to record at least one double-double.

==== 3-point improvement and franchise records (2014–2017) ====
On November 3, 2014, Lopez made his 2014–15 season debut after missing the first two games with a foot injury. In just under 24 minutes of action, he recorded 18 points, six rebounds, two blocks, and one steal in the 116–85 win over the Oklahoma City Thunder. He went on to miss eight games between December 8 and 21 with a lower back strain, and following his return on December 23 against the Denver Nuggets, Lopez was benched in favor of Mason Plumlee who was the starting center in Lopez' absence. He remained coming off the bench for three more games before starting alongside Plumlee on December 30 against the Chicago Bulls with Kevin Garnett out resting. Lopez subsequently recorded 29 points, five rebounds, and two blocks in the 96–82 win.

On March 20, 2015, Lopez recorded 32 points and a season-high 18 rebounds in a 129-127 triple overtime win over the Milwaukee Bucks. On April 6, he was named the Eastern Conference Player of the Week for games played Monday, March 30 through Sunday, April 5. Lopez led the Nets to a 3-1 week behind team-leading averages of 20.8 points (sixth in the conference), 10.3 rebounds (fourth in the conference), and 2.0 blocks (tied-fifth in the conference). On June 26, Lopez opted out of his contract with the Nets to become a free agent.

On July 9, 2015, Lopez re-signed with the Nets on a three–year contract. On December 8, in a win over the Houston Rockets, Lopez became the sixth player to make 400 starts for the Nets franchise, following Buck Williams (633), Jason Kidd (504), Kerry Kittles (455), Richard Jefferson (417), and Jason Collins (405). On December 26, in a loss to the Washington Wizards, Lopez made nine field goals and passed Vince Carter (3,126) for second in franchise history. Lopez finished the game with 3,127 career field goals made, a mark trailing only Buck Williams (3,981).

On January 2, 2016, Lopez recorded a then season-high 30 points and 13 rebounds in a 100–97 win over the Boston Celtics. Two days later, he was named Eastern Conference Player of the Week for games played Monday, December 28 through Sunday, January 3. On January 24, Lopez scored a season-high 31 points in a 116–106 win over the Oklahoma City Thunder. He topped that mark six days later, recording 33 points and 10 rebounds in a 105–103 loss to the New Orleans Pelicans. On February 19, Lopez tied his season-high of 33 points in a 109–98 win over the New York Knicks. He moved past Richard Jefferson (8,507 points) into third place on the Nets' career scoring list. On March 24, with 22 points against the Cleveland Cavaliers, Lopez moved past Vince Carter into second place on the Nets' career scoring list with 8,835 points.

During the offseason, Nets coach Kenny Atkinson told Lopez to be ready to become a three-point shooting specialist during training camp. On November 2, 2016, Lopez recorded 34 points and 11 rebounds in a 109–101 win over the Detroit Pistons. He hit four three-pointers during the game, matching his career total for three-pointers made; he also made multiple three-pointers in a game for the first time in his career. On November 15, Lopez recorded 30 points, 10 rebounds and three blocks in a 125–118 loss to the Los Angeles Lakers. He became the Nets' franchise leader in blocked shots, passing George Johnson's 863 blocks. On December 28, Lopez scored 33 points and hit a then career-high five three-pointers in a 101–99 loss to the Chicago Bulls. On January 25, 2017, he had another 33-point effort while setting a then career high with seven three-pointers in a 109–106 loss to the Miami Heat. On February 15, Lopez scored a season-high 36 points and tied his career high with eight blocks in a 129–125 loss to the Milwaukee Bucks. On March 1, he scored 24 points in a 109–100 win over the Sacramento Kings. It was only Brooklyn's 10th win of the season, as Lopez surpassed 10,000 points with the Nets. He became the second player in Nets history to score 10,000 points—his 10,014 points seeing him sit behind only Buck Williams (10,440) on the franchise list. On March 26 against the Atlanta Hawks, Lopez became the Nets' career leader in field goals, passing Buck Williams. Lopez got the seven field goals he needed to pass Williams' team record of 3,981. With 25 points against the Boston Celtics on April 10, Lopez passed Williams to become the franchise's career leading scorer.

=== Los Angeles Lakers (2017–2018) ===
On June 22, 2017, Lopez was traded, along with the rights to Kyle Kuzma (the 27th pick in the 2017 NBA draft), to his hometown team the Los Angeles Lakers in exchange for D'Angelo Russell and Timofey Mozgov. In his debut for the Lakers in their season opener on October 19, Lopez scored 20 points in a 108–92 loss to the Los Angeles Clippers. On November 3, he hit six three-pointers and scored a season-high 34 points in a 124–112 win over his former team, the Brooklyn Nets. Lopez missed eight games between December 20 and January 1, 2018 with a right ankle injury.

=== Milwaukee Bucks (2018–2025) ===
==== First years in Milwaukee and All-Defensive honors (2018–2020) ====
On July 17, 2018, Lopez signed with the Milwaukee Bucks. In his debut for the Bucks in their season opener on October 17, Lopez scored 14 points in a 113–112 win over the Charlotte Hornets. On November 11, he had a career-high eight 3-pointers and 28 points in a 121–114 win over the Denver Nuggets. After not making a single three-point shot in his first six NBA seasons, Lopez became a reliable threat from deep, including making at least six three-pointers in three out of four games for the Bucks between November 6–11. He gained the nickname "Splash Mountain", a nod to the Splash Brothers, the prolific three-point-shooting guards Stephen Curry and Klay Thompson of the Golden State Warriors and the Disney Parks ride of the same name. Lopez also improved his free-throw shooting after joining the Bucks, quickly becoming one of the Bucks' most reliable free-throw shooters. Lopez shot 84% on free-throws since joining the Bucks, compared to averaging 79% prior in his career. On January 1, 2019, Lopez recorded 25 points and made 7–of–12 from 3-point range in a 121–98 win over the Detroit Pistons. On March 19, he tied a season high with 28 points in a 115–101 win over the Los Angeles Lakers. In Game 1 of the Eastern Conference Finals, Lopez scored a playoff career-high 29 points to lead the Bucks to a 108–100 win over the Toronto Raptors.

Lopez signed a four-year, $52 million contract extension with the Bucks following the 2019 season. He made his season debut for the team on October 24, 2019, logging 11 points, three assists, and five blocks in a 117–111 win over the Houston Rockets. On December 19, Lopez recorded a season-high four steals in a 111–104 win over the Los Angeles Lakers. On December 21, Lopez recorded a season-high seven blocks in a 123–102 win over the New York Knicks. He matched this total on January 4, 2020, in a 127–118 win over the San Antonio Spurs. On February 2, Lopez tied a career-high eight blocks, alongside scoring 17 points, in a 129–108 win against the Phoenix Suns. On August 8, Lopez scored a season-high 34 points along with seven rebounds and two blocks in a 136–132 overtime loss to the Dallas Mavericks.

==== First championship and runner-up for DPOY award (2020–2025) ====
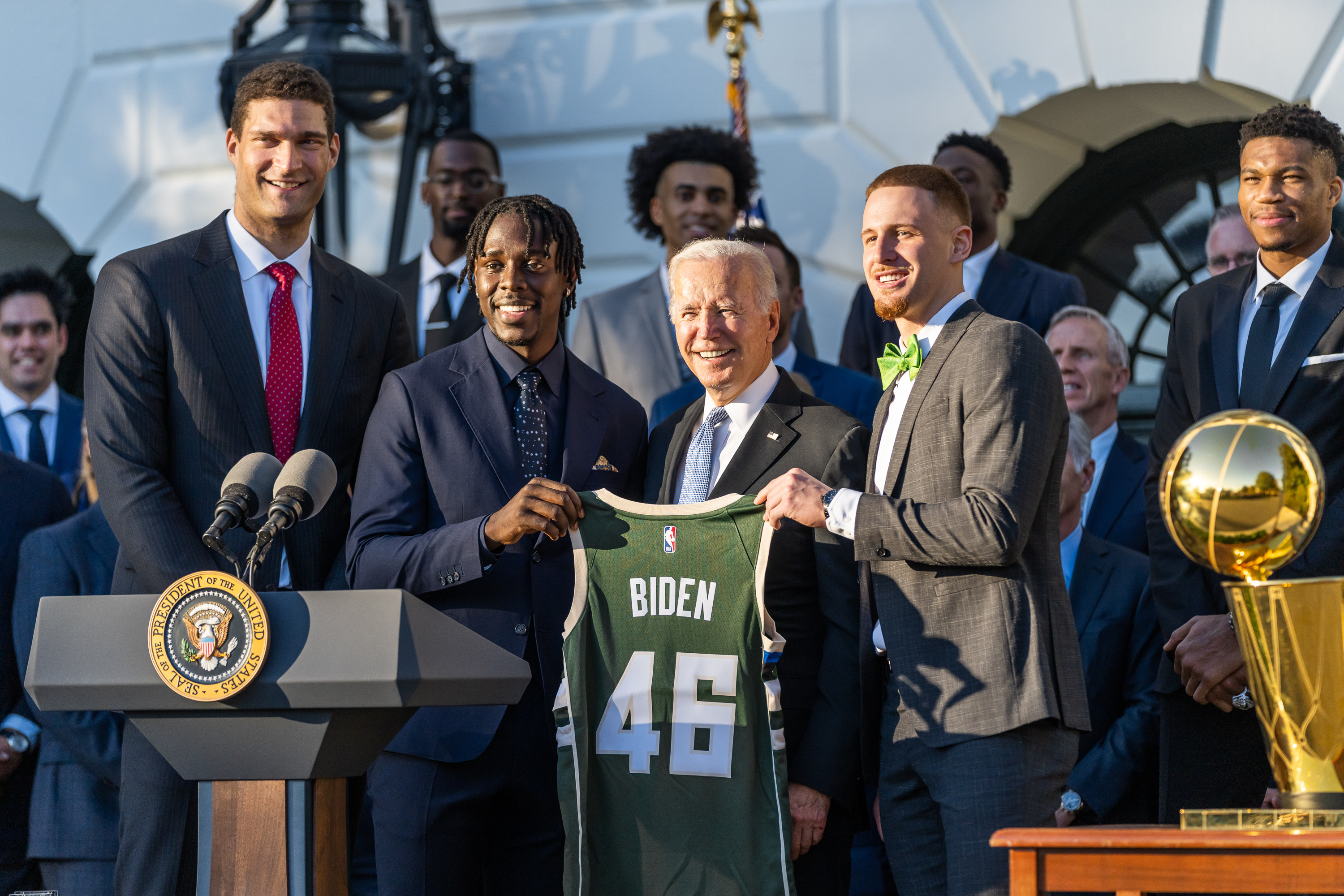
Lopez (left) stands beside teammates and U.S. President Joe Biden during the Milwaukee Bucks' White House visit, with the Larry O'Brien Championship Trophy displayed at right.

On December 23, 2020, Lopez made his season debut for the Bucks, recording seven points, three rebounds, and two blocks in a 122–121 loss to the Boston Celtics. On April 4, 2021, he logged a season-high 26 points along with four rebounds and two blocks in a 129–128 win over the Sacramento Kings. In Game 5 of the Eastern Conference Finals against the Atlanta Hawks, Lopez put up a new post-season career–high 33 points to lead the Bucks to a 123–112 victory. The Bucks went on to beat the Hawks in Game 6 to advance to the 2021 NBA Finals, where despite facing a 2–0 series deficit, they would defeat the Phoenix Suns in six games to give him his first NBA championship.

Lopez made his season debut for the Bucks on October 19, 2021, where he logged eight points, five rebounds, and three blocks in a 127–104 win over the Brooklyn Nets. After that game, he was sidelined indefinitely with a back injury. There was no timetable set for his return. On December 2, Lopez underwent surgery for the injury, and was officially ruled out indefinitely. Lopez made his return on March 14, 2022, where he recorded six points, one rebound, one assist, and one steal in a win against the Utah Jazz. On April 5, Lopez had a team–high 28 points and three blocks in a 127–106 win as the Bucks swept the Chicago Bulls in the regular season. On April 20, Lopez scored 25 points and grabbed six rebounds in a 114–110 loss in Game 2 of the first round of the playoffs against Chicago.

On November 16, 2022, Lopez scored a game-leading 29 points, while adding five rebounds and three blocks, during a 113–98 win against the Cleveland Cavaliers. On December 9, Lopez made a game-winning field goal in a 106–105 win over the Dallas Mavericks. On March 9, 2023, Lopez recorded a career-high nine blocks, while adding 24 points and 10 rebounds, during a 118–113 win over the Brooklyn Nets. In Game 2 of the Bucks first round playoff series against the Miami Heat, Lopez scored 25 points in a 138–122 win to tie the series at a game apiece. In Game 4, Lopez recorded a playoff career-high 36 points, 11 rebounds, two steals and three blocks, but the Bucks lost the game 119–114. The next game, the Bucks were eliminated after their third straight loss to the Heat. During the playoffs, Lopez finished second in voting for Defensive Player of the Year, and was named for the first time to the NBA All-Defensive First Team.

On July 6, 2023, Lopez re-signed with the Bucks. On November 24, Lopez tied his career–high with 39 points on 14-of-17 shooting, 4-of-7 from three and 7-of-7 from the free throw line in a 131–128 win over the Washington Wizards. On April 29, 2024, during the NBA playoffs, Lopez scored a team-leading 27 points and grabbed nine rebounds during a 126–113 Game 4 loss to the Indiana Pacers.

=== Los Angeles Clippers (2025–present) ===
On July 6, 2025, Lopez signed with the Los Angeles Clippers on a two-year, $18 million deal. On December 26, Lopez put up 31 points on a career-high nine three-pointers made in a 119–103 win over the Portland Trail Blazers.

== Career statistics ==
Legend
GP	Games played	GS	Games started	MPG	Minutes per game
FG%	Field goal percentage	3P%	3-point field goal percentage	FT%	Free throw percentage
RPG	Rebounds per game	APG	Assists per game	SPG	Steals per game
BPG	Blocks per game	PPG	Points per game	**Bold**	Career high
†	Won an NBA championship	*	Led the league

=== NBA ===
==== Regular season ====
Year	Team	GP	GS	MPG	FG%	3P%	FT%	RPG	APG	SPG	BPG	PPG
2008–09	New Jersey	**82***	75	30.5	.531	.000	.793	8.1	1.0	.5	1.8	13.0
2009–10	New Jersey	**82***	**82***	**36.9**	.499	.000	.817	**8.6**	**2.3**	.7	1.7	18.8
2010–11	New Jersey	**82**	**82***	35.2	.492	.000	.787	6.0	1.6	.6	1.5	20.4
2011–12	New Jersey	5	5	27.2	.494	—	.625	3.6	1.2	.2	.8	19.2
2012–13	Brooklyn	74	74	30.5	.521	.000	.758	6.9	.9	.4	2.1	19.4
2013–14	Brooklyn	17	17	31.4	**.563**	.000	.817	6.0	.9	.5	1.8	**20.7**
2014–15	Brooklyn	72	44	29.2	.513	.100	.814	7.4	.7	.6	1.8	17.2
2015–16	Brooklyn	73	73	33.7	.511	.143	.787	7.8	2.0	**.8**	1.7	20.6
2016–17	Brooklyn	75	75	29.6	.474	.346	.810	5.4	2.3	.5	1.7	20.5
2017–18	L.A. Lakers	74	72	23.4	.465	.345	.703	4.0	1.7	.4	1.3	13.0
2018–19	Milwaukee	81	81	28.7	.452	.365	.842	4.9	1.2	.6	2.2	12.5
2019–20	Milwaukee	68	67	26.7	.435	.314	.836	4.6	1.5	.7	2.4	12.0
2020–21†	Milwaukee	70	70	27.2	.503	.338	.845	5.0	.7	.6	1.5	12.3
2021–22	Milwaukee	13	11	23.0	.466	.358	**.870**	4.1	.5	.6	1.2	12.4
2022–23	Milwaukee	78	78	30.4	.531	**.374**	.784	6.7	1.3	.5	**2.5**	15.9
2023–24	Milwaukee	79	79	30.5	.485	.366	.821	5.2	1.6	.5	2.4	12.5
2024–25	Milwaukee	80	80	31.8	.509	.373	.826	5.0	1.8	.6	1.9	13.0
2025–26	L.A. Clippers	75	40	21.8	.428	.360	.757	3.6	1.3	.6	1.2	8.5
Career		1,180	1,105	29.8	.494	.353	.797	5.9	1.5	.6	1.8	15.4
All-Star		1	0	10.6	.000	.000	.750	5.0	3.0	.0	.0	3.0

==== Playoffs ====
Year	Team	GP	GS	MPG	FG%	3P%	FT%	RPG	APG	SPG	BPG	PPG
2013	Brooklyn	7	7	37.6	.472	**1.000**	.886	7.4	1.4	.9	**3.0**	**22.3**
2015	Brooklyn	6	6	**38.9**	.494	—	.825	**9.0**	.8	.7	2.2	19.8
2019	Milwaukee	15	15	29.2	.455	.293	.828	5.5	1.4	.4	1.9	11.2
2020	Milwaukee	10	10	32.8	.535	.396	.750	5.5	.5	1.0	1.3	15.8
2021†	Milwaukee	**23**	**23**	29.0	.548	.319	.860	5.9	.3	.7	1.5	13.0
2022	Milwaukee	12	12	27.7	.490	.214	.913	5.9	.7	.5	1.5	10.6
2023	Milwaukee	5	5	36.3	.582	.412	.769	6.4	1.2	**1.4**	1.8	19.0
2024	Milwaukee	6	6	33.4	**.587**	.435	.533	4.3	**1.8**	.0	1.3	17.7
2025	Milwaukee	5	4	14.8	.364	.267	**1.000**	1.6	.8	.2	1.0	5.0
Career		89	88	30.5	.513	.331	.828	5.8	.9	.6	1.7	14.1

=== College ===
Year	Team	GP	GS	MPG	FG%	3P%	FT%	RPG	APG	SPG	BPG	PPG
2006–07	Stanford	26	18	25.2	**.496**	**.200**	.692	6.0	.8	.4	1.7	12.6
2007–08	Stanford	**27**	**25**	**30.8**	.468	.000	**.789**	**8.2**	**1.4**	**.6**	**2.1**	**19.3**
Career		53	43	28.0	.480	.143	.764	7.1	1.1	.5	1.9	16.0

== Personal life ==
Lopez is older than his twin brother, Robin, by one minute. They have two other brothers—Chris and Alex. Alex played college basketball for Washington and Santa Clara, and professionally in Japan, New Zealand, and Spain. Both Brook and Robin are well known among NBA fans for their Disney fandom.

Lopez is married.

== See also ==
- List of NBA career blocks leaders
- List of NBA seasons played leaders
- 2006 high school boys basketball All-Americans
- List of NBA All-Stars
