= Keyon Dooling =

American basketball player (born 1980)

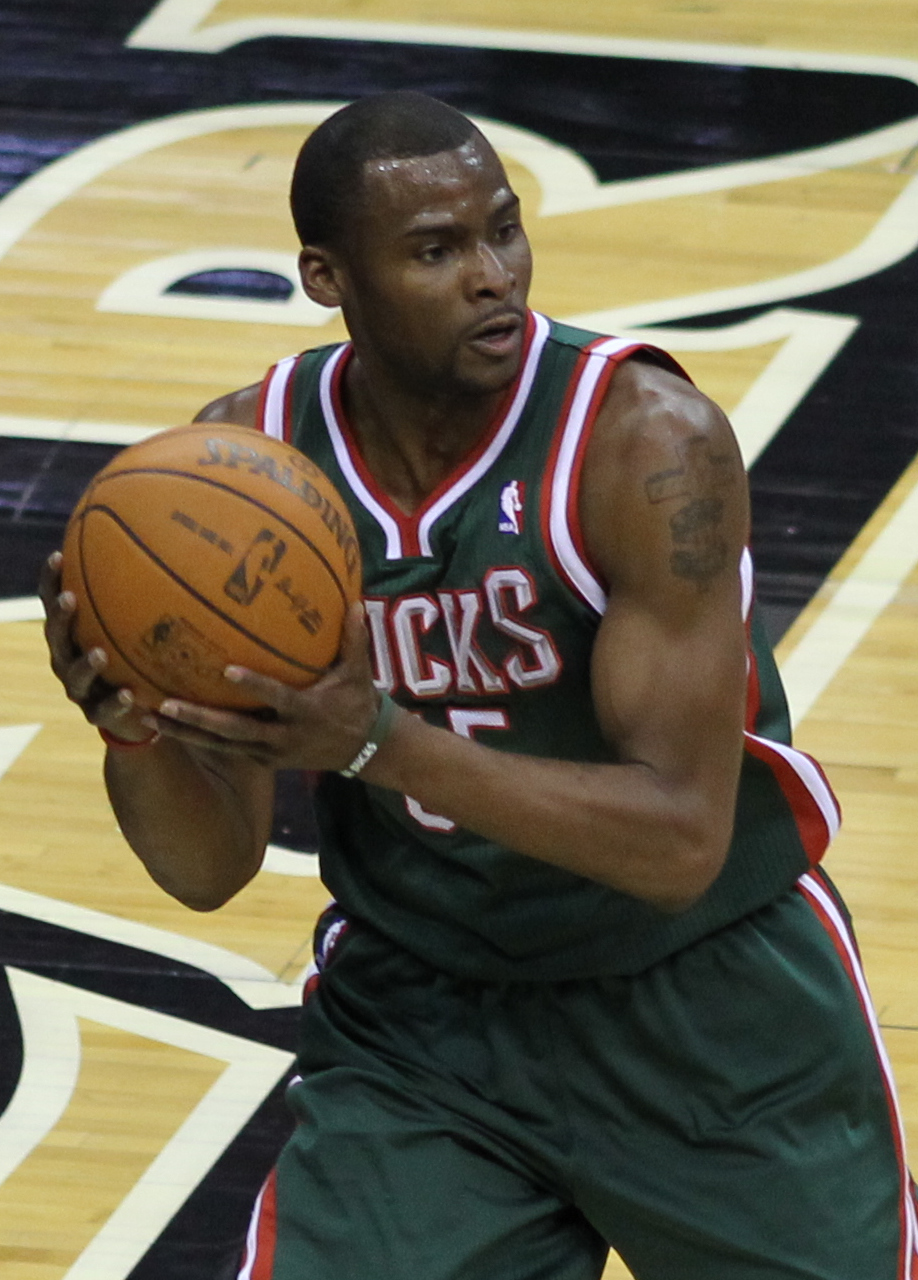
- Dooling with the Milwaukee Bucks in 2011

Personal information
- Born: May 8, 1980 (age 46) Fort Lauderdale, Florida, U.S.
- Listed height: 6 ft 3 in (1.91 m)
- Listed weight: 195 lb (88 kg)

Career information
- High school: Dillard (Fort Lauderdale, Florida)
- College: Missouri (1998–2000)
- NBA draft: 2000: 1st round, 10th overall pick
- Drafted by: Orlando Magic
- Playing career: 2000–2013
- Position: Point guard / shooting guard
- Number: 1, 5, 55, 51
- Coaching career: 2020–present

Career history

Playing
- 2000–2004: Los Angeles Clippers
- 2004–2005: Miami Heat
- 2005–2008: Orlando Magic
- 2008–2010: New Jersey Nets
- 2010–2011: Milwaukee Bucks
- 2011–2012: Boston Celtics
- 2013: Memphis Grizzlies
- 2013: →Reno Bighorns

Coaching
- 2020–2022: Utah Jazz (assistant)

Career highlights
- Third-team Parade All-American (1998)
- Stats at NBA.com
- Stats at Basketball Reference
Medals
Men's basketball
Representing United States
FIBA Americas U18 Championship
Gold medal – first place	1998 Puerto Plata	Team competition
FIBA U19 World Championship
Silver medal – second place	1999 Lisbon	Team competition

Keyon Latwae Dooling (born May 8, 1980) is an American former basketball player and coach who played 13 seasons in the National Basketball Association (NBA).

Born in Fort Lauderdale, Florida, Dooling attended Boston College and played basketball for the Missouri Tigers for two seasons. After being chosen with the 10th pick of the 2000 NBA draft, Dooling began his NBA career with the Los Angeles Clippers. Dooling later played for the Miami Heat, the Orlando Magic, the New Jersey Nets, the Milwaukee Bucks, the Boston Celtics, and the Memphis Grizzlies before ending his playing career in 2013.

The Utah Jazz hired Dooling as a player development coach in 2020, but placed him on administrative leave in 2022. In February 2023, Dooling was sentenced to prison for his role in a plot to defraud the NBA's health and welfare benefit plan.

== Early life and prep career ==
Dooling was born to Leroy and Brenda Dooling on May 8, 1980, in Fort Lauderdale, Florida.

Dooling averaged 22 points, six assists, six rebounds, and five steals per game during his senior year at Ft. Lauderdale's Dillard High School. He was also named a third-team Parade All-American. In the summer of 1997, Dooling was selected to the USA Basketball Men's Junior World Championship Qualifying Team. He started in all six games he played in the Dominican Republic. Dooling helped his team to the gold medal, averaging 7.8 points per game and adding 14 assists and eight steals.

== Collegiate career ==
Dooling played college basketball for the University of Missouri. He was selected as the Big 12 Conference Preseason Freshman of the Year. In 59 games over two seasons in Columbia, MO, Dooling averaged 12.1 points and 2.4 assists per game. The Tigers advanced to the NCAA tournament following both of Dooling's seasons with the team.

== Professional career ==
A 6-foot-3-inch (1.91 m), 195-pound (88 kg) guard, Dooling was selected by the Orlando Magic with the 10th overall pick of the 2000 NBA draft. On draft day, he was traded—along with Corey Maggette, Derek Strong and cash—to the Los Angeles Clippers in exchange for a future first-round selection.

Dooling signed with the Miami Heat for the 2004–05 season. During the 2005 offseason, he returned to the Magic on a three-year, $10 million contract. In a January 11, 2006, game against the Seattle SuperSonics, Dooling and eventual teammate Ray Allen were involved in a scuffle that resulted in Dooling being suspended for five games and Allen for three.

In July 2008, Dooling was re-signed by the Magic on a two-year, $6.8 million contract and traded to the New Jersey Nets.

On July 19, 2010, Dooling signed a two-year, $4.16 million contract with the Milwaukee Bucks.

On December 9, 2011, Dooling and a 2012 second-round pick were traded to Boston Celtics in exchange for the draft rights to Albert Miralles.

On July 31, 2012, Dooling re-signed with the Celtics.

On September 20, 2012, Dooling was waived by the Celtics. He then became a player development coordinator for the Celtics. On April 3, 2013, Dooling came out of retirement and signed with the Memphis Grizzlies. The Grizzlies assigned him to the Reno Bighorns of the NBA D-League. He was recalled the next day.

As a member of the Grizzlies, Dooling played his final NBA game on May 27, 2013, in Game Four of the Western Conference Finals against the San Antonio Spurs.

Dooling served as first vice president of the National Basketball Players Association.

Dooling played in 728 regular-season games in his NBA career, averaging 7.0 points and 2.2 assists per game.

== Coaching career ==
On September 25, 2020, the Utah Jazz announced that they had hired Dooling as player development coach. The Jazz placed Dooling on administrative leave in April 2022 after he was arrested and charged with fraud.

== Criminal proceedings ==
On April 27, 2022, Dooling was arrested on charges stemming from his role in an alleged scheme to defraud the NBA's health and welfare benefit plan. He was "added to a criminal case in which 18 former NBA players were charged with illegally pocketing millions of dollars" by submitting fraudulent claims to the NBA's plan. Dooling was accused of participating in the fraudulent scheme and of inviting others to participate in it as well. Authorities claimed that Dooling obtained approximately $350,000 in ill-gotten gains due to his fraud.

In September 2022, Dooling pleaded guilty to conspiracy to commit health care fraud. On February 18, 2023, Dooling was sentenced to 30 months in prison. He served over 10 months in prison and four months in a halfway house. After that, he was confined to his home for two months.

== Personal life ==
Dooling and his wife, Natosha Dooling, have four children.

In 2012, Dooling suffered from post-traumatic stress disorder and was institutionalized for a period of time. Later that year, Dooling publicly disclosed that he is a survivor of childhood sexual abuse. On May 1, 2018, Dooling published an essay about his experiences with childhood abuse and with mental health difficulties; the essay, entitled "Running from a Ghost", was published at ThePlayersTribune.com.

== NBA career statistics ==
Legend
GP	Games played	GS	Games started	MPG	Minutes per game
FG%	Field goal percentage	3P%	3-point field goal percentage	FT%	Free throw percentage
RPG	Rebounds per game	APG	Assists per game	SPG	Steals per game
BPG	Blocks per game	PPG	Points per game	**Bold**	Career high

=== Regular season ===
Year	Team	GP	GS	MPG	FG%	3P%	FT%	RPG	APG	SPG	BPG	PPG
2000–01	L.A. Clippers	76	1	16.3	.409	.350	.698	1.2	2.3	.5	.1	5.9
2001–02	L.A. Clippers	14	0	11.1	.386	.286	.833	.2	.9	.3	**.2**	4.1
2002–03	L.A. Clippers	55	1	17.6	.389	.360	.772	1.3	1.6	.4	.1	6.4
2003–04	L.A. Clippers	58	**24**	19.6	.389	.174	.830	1.4	2.2	.8	.1	6.2
2004–05	Miami	74	0	16.0	.403	.253	.780	1.2	1.8	.5	.1	5.2
2005–06	Orlando	50	7	22.7	.440	.302	.835	1.6	2.2	**1.0**	.1	9.4
2006–07	Orlando	66	2	21.7	.410	.323	.809	1.3	1.7	.8	**.2**	7.9
2007–08	Orlando	72	1	18.5	.468	.338	.845	1.4	1.8	.5	.1	8.1
2008–09	New Jersey	77	18	**26.9**	.436	**.421**	.825	**2.0**	**3.5**	.9	.1	**9.7**
2009–10	New Jersey	53	8	18.3	.398	.376	.770	1.0	2.5	.6	.0	6.9
2010–11	Milwaukee	**80**	22	22.0	.397	.346	.830	1.5	3.0	.7	.1	7.1
2011–12	Boston	46	2	14.4	.405	.333	.742	.8	1.1	.3	.0	4.0
2012–13	Memphis	7	0	11.7	**.476**	.417	**.857**	.1	1.1	.1	.0	4.4
Career		728	86	19.4	.416	.349	.799	1.3	2.2	.6	.1	7.0

=== Playoffs ===
Year	Team	GP	GS	MPG	FG%	3P%	FT%	RPG	APG	SPG	BPG	PPG
2005	Miami	15	0	**17.6**	**.494**	.368	.810	1.1	**1.7**	.4	.1	**7.3**
2007	Orlando	4	0	16.3	.480	.333	.667	**1.8**	1.3	.5	**.3**	**7.3**
2008	Orlando	10	0	14.8	.393	.391	.867	1.0	.7	**.6**	.1	6.6
2012	Boston	**20**	0	10.6	.438	**.393**	.667	.8	.7	.3	.2	2.8
2013	Memphis	14	0	8.1	.333	.385	**1.000**	.4	.3	.1	.0	1.9
Career		63	0	12.7	.442	.384	.824	.8	.9	.3	.1	4.6
