= Maurice Ager =

American basketball player (born 1984)

Personal information
- Born: February 9, 1984 (age 42) Detroit, Michigan, U.S.
- Listed height: 6 ft 5 in (1.96 m)
- Listed weight: 202 lb (92 kg)

Career information
- High school: Crockett (Detroit, Michigan)
- College: Michigan State (2002–2006)
- NBA draft: 2006: 1st round, 28th overall pick
- Drafted by: Dallas Mavericks
- Playing career: 2006–2010
- Position: Shooting guard
- Number: 13, 15

Career history
- 2006–2008: Dallas Mavericks
- 2006–2007: Fort Worth Flyers
- 2008: Tulsa 66ers
- 2008–2009: New Jersey Nets
- 2009–2010: Cajasol Sevilla
- 2010: Maine Red Claws
- 2010: Minnesota Timberwolves

Career highlights
- 2× Second-team All-Big Ten (2005, 2006)
- Stats at NBA.com
- Stats at Basketball Reference

Maurice Darnell Ager (born February 9, 1984) is an American former professional basketball player. He played college basketball for the Michigan State Spartans from 2002 until 2006. Ager led the Spartans to the NCAA Final Four as a junior in 2005 and averaged 14 points per game. He led the Big Ten Conference in scoring during his senior season. Ager was selected by the Dallas Mavericks with 28th overall pick of the 2006 NBA draft. He played parts of four seasons in the National Basketball Association (NBA) for the Dallas Mavericks, New Jersey Nets and Minnesota Timberwolves. Ager also played in the NBA Development League and in Spain.

Ager became a record producer after his retirement from playing. He has lived in China and Vietnam where he ran basketball camps for children.

== Early life ==
Ager was raised in Detroit, Michigan. His mother, Mattie Ager, was a doo-wop singer and married an architect and instrumentalist, Melvin Rucker. Ager attended Crockett High School where he averaged 24 points, 7 rebounds and 4 assists as a senior on the basketball team.

== College career ==
Ager attended Michigan State from 2002 to 2006. In his freshman year, he averaged 6.7 points per game as the Spartans advanced to the Elite Eight before losing to Texas. As a sophomore in 2004, he increased his scoring average to 8.5 points per game while averaging 22.5 minutes per game.

In 2005, Ager was the top scorer for Michigan State, averaging 14.1 points per game while averaging 26.3 minutes per game. He led the Spartans to the Final Four by defeating Kentucky in a double-overtime game in the Elite Eight. He was named to the Austin All-Regional team after averaging 16.8 points and 5 rebounds a game. Ager scored 24 points against North Carolina in the Final Four, but the Spartans lost to the eventual national champions.

Ager again led the Spartans in scoring in 2006, as he averaged 19.3 points per game as a senior. On November 22, 2005, at the Maui Invitational Tournament, Ager faced off against Gonzaga's Adam Morrison. Down by three, Ager sank a three-point shot at the buzzer to send the game into overtime. Despite Ager's team-high 36 points, Gonzaga knocked off the Spartans in triple overtime 109–106. The next day Ager led the Spartans with 20 points to defeat Arizona 74–71 in overtime.

Ager finished his career with 1,554 points with the Spartans.

== Professional career ==
Ager was selected by the Dallas Mavericks in the NBA draft with the 28th overall pick.

While with the Mavericks in 2006, Ager was assigned to the Fort Worth Flyers of the D-League. Ager would appear in 32 games in his rookie season for the Mavericks. He appeared in 12 games for the Mavericks in 2007–08. On February 19, 2008, Ager was traded by the Mavericks to the New Jersey Nets in a multi-player deal involving point guard Jason Kidd. During this time, he also played in the NBA's D-League. Ager would appear in 14 games for the Nets and 20 games in 2008–09. Following his stint with the Nets, he played in the D-League and Spain. After appearing four games for the Minnesota Timberwolves in 2010, he was waived on November 11, 2010.

== NBA career statistics ==
Legend
GP	Games played	GS	Games started	MPG	Minutes per game
FG%	Field goal percentage	3P%	3-point field goal percentage	FT%	Free throw percentage
RPG	Rebounds per game	APG	Assists per game	SPG	Steals per game
BPG	Blocks per game	PPG	Points per game	**Bold**	Career high

=== Regular season ===
Year	Team	GP	GS	MPG	FG%	3P%	FT%	RPG	APG	SPG	BPG	PPG
2006–07	Dallas	**32**	1	6.7	.314	.333	.606	**.7**	.2	.1	**.1**	2.2
2007–08	Dallas	12	**3**	6.4	.185	.000	**.833**	.3	**.3**	.0	**.1**	1.3
2007–08	New Jersey	14	0	6.3	.421	.273	.167	.6	**.3**	.0	.0	2.6
2008–09	New Jersey	20	0	4.9	.349	.000	.500	.5	.2	.1	**.1**	1.7
2010–11	Minnesota	4	0	**7.3**	**.545**	**.750**	.000	.5	**.3**	**.3**	.0	**3.8**
Career		82	4	6.2	.339	.250	.566	.6	.2	.1	.1	2.1

=== Playoffs ===
Year	Team	GP	GS	MPG	FG%	3P%	FT%	RPG	APG	SPG	BPG	PPG
2007	Dallas	3	0	8.0	.556	.667	.500	1.0	.0	.0	.0	5.0
Career		3	0	8.0	.556	.667	.500	1.0	.0	.0	.0	5.0

== Post-playing career ==
=== Record production ===
In 2010, Ager relocated to Los Angeles, California, and embarked on a career as a hip hop record producer. In July 2011, he signed a non-exclusive deal with Akon's record label 50/50 Konvict Muzik.

Ager received ballot consideration for the 56th Annual Grammy Awards for his single, "Far From Home." Ager's single, "Forever I'm a Spartan," was released as an anthem for the Michigan State University football team in 2010.

=== Basketball camps ===
Ager lived in China from 2017 to 2019 and hosted basketball camps for children. He moved to Hanoi, Vietnam, in 2019 and ran the Moe Ager Hoop School.

== Personal life ==
Ager was raised as a devout Christian by his mother. During his college career, his Michigan State head coach, Tom Izzo, moved team practices on Sunday to afternoons so Ager could attend morning church services.
