= 2007–08 New Jersey Nets season =

NBA professional basketball team season

- Head coach: Lawrence Frank
- Arena: Izod Center

Results
- Record: 34–48 (.415)
- Place: Division: 4th (Atlantic); Conference: 10th (Eastern)
- Playoff finish: Did not qualify
- Stats at Basketball Reference

Local media
- Television: YES Network, WWOR
- Radio: WFAN

The 2007–08 New Jersey Nets season was the 41st season, 32nd in the NBA basketball in East Rutherford, New Jersey. In midseason, All-Star point guard Jason Kidd was shipped to the Dallas Mavericks, the team where he began his career. He would later help the Mavericks win their first ever NBA championship in 2011. Kidd would later return to the Nets, in Brooklyn, as their head coach for the 2013–14 season.

Key dates prior to the start of the season:

- The 2007 NBA draft took place in New York City on June 28.
- The free agency period then began in July 2007.

== Draft picks ==
Round	Pick	Player	Position	Nationality	College
1	17	Sean Williams	Forward	United States	Boston College

== Roster ==
2007–08 New Jersey Nets roster
Players

Pos.	No.	Player	Height	Weight	DOB	From
G	13	Maurice Ager	6 ft 5 in (1.96 m)	202 lb (92 kg)	1984-02-09	Michigan State
PG	10	Darrell Armstrong	6 ft 1 in (1.85 m)	180 lb (82 kg)	1968-06-22	Fayetteville State
PF	2	Josh Boone	6 ft 10 in (2.08 m)	245 lb (111 kg)	1984-11-21	Connecticut
SG	15	Vince Carter	6 ft 6 in (1.98 m)	220 lb (100 kg)	1977-01-26	North Carolina
C	14	DeSagana Diop	7 ft 0 in (2.13 m)	280 lb (127 kg)	1982-01-30	Oak Hill Academy (VA)
PG	34	Devin Harris	6 ft 3 in (1.91 m)	185 lb (84 kg)	1983-02-27	Wisconsin
G/F	44	Trenton Hassell	6 ft 5 in (1.96 m)	233 lb (106 kg)	1979-03-04	Austin Peay
SF	24	Richard Jefferson	6 ft 7 in (2.01 m)	230 lb (104 kg)	1980-06-21	Arizona
C	12	Nenad Krstić	7 ft 0 in (2.13 m)	260 lb (118 kg)	1983-07-25	Serbia
SF	7	Boštjan Nachbar	6 ft 9 in (2.06 m)	221 lb (100 kg)	1980-07-03	Slovenia
F/C	6	Stromile Swift	6 ft 10 in (2.08 m)	220 lb (100 kg)	1979-11-21	LSU
PF	22	Keith Van Horn	6 ft 10 in (2.08 m)	240 lb (109 kg)	1975-10-23	Utah
PG	1	Marcus Williams	6 ft 3 in (1.91 m)	205 lb (93 kg)	1985-12-03	Connecticut
PF	51	Sean Williams	6 ft 10 in (2.08 m)	235 lb (107 kg)	1986-09-13	Boston College

Coaches
Head coach
- Lawrence Frank
Assistant(s)
- Brian Hill
- Bill Cartwright
- Tom Barrise
- Pat Sullivan

Legend
- (DP) Unsigned draft pick
- (FA) Free agent
- (S) Suspended
- Injured

Roster
Updated: 2008-02-04

== Regular season ==
=== Standings ===
Atlantic Division	W	L	PCT	GB	Home	Road	Div
z-Boston Celtics	66	16	.805	–	35–6	31–10	14–2
x-Toronto Raptors	41	41	.500	25	25–16	16–25	10–6
x-Philadelphia 76ers	40	42	.488	26	22–19	18–23	7–9
New Jersey Nets	34	48	.415	32	21–20	13–28	4–12
New York Knicks	23	59	.280	43	15–26	8–33	5–11

Eastern Conference
#	Team	W	L	PCT	GB
1	z-Boston Celtics	66	16	.805	–
2	y-Detroit Pistons	59	23	.732	7
3	y-Orlando Magic	52	30	.634	14
4	x-Cleveland Cavaliers	45	37	.549	21
5	x-Washington Wizards	43	39	.524	23
6	x-Toronto Raptors	41	41	.500	25
7	x-Philadelphia 76ers	40	42	.488	26
8	x-Atlanta Hawks	37	45	.451	29
9	Indiana Pacers	36	46	.439	30
10	New Jersey Nets	34	48	.415	32
11	Chicago Bulls	33	49	.402	33
12	Charlotte Bobcats	32	50	.390	34
13	Milwaukee Bucks	26	56	.317	40
14	New York Knicks	23	59	.280	43
15	Miami Heat	15	67	.183	51

=== Record vs. opponents ===
2007-08 NBA Records
Team	ATL	BOS	CHA	CHI	CLE	DAL	DEN	DET	GSW	HOU	IND	LAC	LAL	MEM	MIA	MIL	MIN	NJN	NOH	NYK	ORL	PHI	PHO	POR	SAC	SAS	SEA	TOR	UTA	WAS
Atlanta	–	0–3	2–2	2–2	1–2	1–1	1–1	0–4	1–1	0–2	1–2	1–1	1–1	2–0	3–1	2–2	2–0	1–3	0–2	4–0	2–2	3–1	1–1	0–2	1–1	0–2	1–1	1–2	1–1	2–2
Boston	3–0	–	3–1	4–0	2–2	2–0	1–1	2–1	1–1	2–0	3–0	2–0	2–0	2–0	4–0	4–0	2–0	4–0	1–1	4–0	1–2	3–1	1–1	2–0	2–0	2–0	2–0	3–1	1–1	0–3
Charlotte	2–2	1–3	–	1–3	1–3	0–2	1–1	0–3	1–1	0–2	3–1	2–0	1–1	1–1	3–1	1–2	2–0	1–3	0–2	1–2	1–3	1–2	0–2	2–0	0–2	0–2	2–0	2–2	1–1	1–3
Chicago	2–2	0–4	3–1	–	3–1	0–2	1–1	3–1	1–1	0–2	2–2	1–1	0–2	1–1	2–1	3–1	1–1	1–2	0–2	2–2	0–4	1–3	0–2	0–2	1–1	0–2	2–0	1–2	1–1	1–2
Cleveland	2–1	2–2	3–1	1–3	–	1–1	0–2	1–3	1–1	0–2	4–0	2–0	2–0	2–0	3–0	1–3	2–0	1–3	0–2	2–1	1–3	2–1	0–2	2–0	2–0	1–1	1–1	3–1	1–1	2–2
Dallas	1–1	0–2	2–0	2–0	1–1	–	1–2	1–1	3–1	3–1	1–1	4–0	1–3	4–0	2–0	1–1	3–0	1–1	2–2	2–0	2–0	1–1	2–1	2–2	2–1	1–3	3–1	1–1	2–2	0–2
Denver	1–1	1–1	1–1	1–1	2–0	2–1	–	0–2	3–1	2–2	1–1	3–1	0–3	4–0	2–0	1–1	4–0	2–0	1–2	1–1	1–1	1–1	2–2	2–2	2–1	2–2	3–1	2–0	1–3	2–0
Detroit	4–0	1–2	3–0	1–3	3–1	1–1	2–0	–	2–0	1–1	4–0	2–0	1–1	2–0	4–0	3–1	2–0	3–0	2–0	2–2	2–2	2–2	2–0	1–1	0–2	2–0	2–0	3–1	0–2	2–1
Golden State	1–1	1–1	1–1	1–1	1–1	1–3	1–3	0–2	–	2–2	1–1	3–1	2–2	4–0	2–0	2–0	3–1	1–1	1–2	1–1	1–1	2–0	2–2	2–2	3–1	2–1	2–1	2–0	0–3	2–0
Houston	2–0	0–2	2–0	2–0	2–0	1–3	2–2	1–1	2–2	–	2–0	3–0	2–1	3–1	1–1	2–0	3–0	2–0	2–2	2–0	1–1	0–2	2–2	4–0	2–2	2–2	4–0	1–1	1–2	2–0
Indiana	2–1	0–3	1–3	2–2	0–4	1–1	1–1	0–4	1–1	0–2	–	1–1	0–2	1–1	3–1	3–1	1–1	2–2	1–1	4–0	1–2	3–0	0–2	2–0	1–1	0–2	1–1	1–3	1–1	2–2
L.A. Clippers	1–1	0–2	0–2	1–1	0–2	0–4	1–3	0–2	1–3	0–3	1–1	–	0–4	3–1	1–1	1–1	1–3	2–0	0–4	2–0	0–2	0–2	1–3	0–3	3–1	0–3	2–1	1–1	1–3	0–2
L.A. Lakers	1–1	0–2	1–1	2–0	0–2	3–1	3–0	1–1	2–2	1–2	2–0	4–0	–	2–1	2–0	1–1	3–0	1–1	2–2	2–0	1–1	2–0	3–1	2–2	3–1	2–2	4–0	2–0	3–1	2–0
Memphis	0–2	0–2	1–1	1–1	0–2	0–4	0–4	0–2	0–4	1–3	1–1	1–3	1–2	–	2–0	0–2	2–2	2–0	0–4	2–0	1–1	0–2	0–3	0–3	2–2	1–3	3–1	0–2	0–3	1–1
Miami	1–3	0–4	1–3	1–2	0–3	0–2	0–2	0–4	0–2	1–1	1–3	1–1	0–2	0–2	–	2–2	1–1	1–2	0–2	1–3	0–4	0–3	1–1	0–2	1–1	0–2	1–1	0–4	1–1	0–4
Milwaukee	2–2	0–4	2–1	1–3	3–1	1–1	1–1	1–3	0–2	0–2	1–3	1–1	1–1	2–0	2–2	–	1–1	0–4	0–2	1–3	1–3	1–2	0–2	0–2	0–2	0–2	1–1	1–2	0–2	2–2
Minnesota	0–2	0–2	0–2	1–1	0–2	0–3	0–4	0–2	1–3	0–3	1–1	3–1	0–3	2–2	1–1	1–1	–	1–1	1–3	1–1	1–1	1–1	2–2	0–4	2–1	0–4	1–3	0–2	2–2	0–2
New Jersey	3–1	0–4	3–1	2–1	3–1	1–1	0–2	0–3	1–1	0–2	2–2	0–2	1–1	0–2	2–1	4–0	1–1	–	0–2	1–3	1–3	2–2	0–2	1–1	0–2	0–2	2–0	1–3	1–1	2–1
New Orleans	2–0	1–1	2–0	2–0	2–0	2–2	2–1	0–2	2–1	2–2	1–1	4–0	2–2	4–0	2–0	2–0	3–1	2–0	–	2–0	1–1	2–0	4–0	2–2	1–2	2–2	3–0	1–1	1–3	0–2
New York	0–4	0–4	2–1	2–2	1–2	0–2	1–1	2–2	1–1	0–2	0–4	0–2	0–2	0–2	3–1	3–1	1–1	3–1	0–2	–	1–3	1–3	0–2	0–2	0–2	0–2	0–2	1–3	1–1	2–1
Orlando	2–2	2–1	3–1	4–0	3–1	0–2	1–1	2–2	1–1	1–1	2–1	2–0	1–1	1–1	4–0	3–1	1–1	3–1	1–1	3–1	–	3–1	0–2	2–0	1–1	0–2	2–0	2–1	0–2	3–1
Philadelphia	1–3	1–3	2–1	3–1	1–2	1–1	1–1	2–2	0–2	2–0	0–3	2–0	0–2	2–0	3–0	2–1	1–1	2–2	0–2	3–1	1–3	–	1–1	1–1	1–1	1–1	2–0	1–3	0–2	2–2
Phoenix	1–1	1–1	2–0	2–0	2–0	1–2	2–2	0–2	2–2	2–2	2–0	3–1	1–3	3–0	1–1	2–0	2–2	2–0	0–4	2–0	2–0	1–1	–	3–0	4–0	3–1	4–0	2–0	1–2	2–0
Portland	2–0	0–2	0–2	2–0	0–2	2–2	2–2	1–1	2–2	0–4	0–2	3–0	2–2	3–0	2–0	2–0	4–0	1–1	2–2	2–0	0–2	1–1	0–3	–	1–3	0–3	2–2	1–1	3–1	1–1
Sacramento	1–1	0–2	2–0	1–1	0–2	1–2	1–2	2–0	1–3	2–2	1–1	1–3	1–3	2–2	1–1	2–0	1–2	2–0	2–1	2–0	1–1	1–1	0–4	3–1	–	1–3	3–1	1–1	2–2	0–2
San Antonio	2–0	0–2	2–0	2–0	1–1	3–1	2–2	0–2	1–2	2–2	2–0	3–0	2–2	3–1	2–0	2–0	4–0	2–0	2–2	2–0	2–0	1–1	1–3	3–0	3–1	–	2–1	1–1	2–2	2–0
Seattle	1–1	0–2	0–2	0–2	1–1	1–3	1–3	0–2	1–2	0–4	1–1	1–2	0–4	1–3	1–1	1–1	3–1	0–2	0–3	2–0	0–2	0–2	0–4	2–2	1–3	1–2	–	1–1	0–4	0–2
Toronto	2–1	1–3	2–2	2–1	1–3	1–1	0–2	1–3	0–2	1–1	3–1	1–1	0–2	2–0	4–0	2–1	2–0	3–1	1–1	3–1	1–2	3–1	0–2	1–1	1–1	1–1	1–1	–	0–2	1–3
Utah	1–1	1–1	1–1	1–1	1–1	2–2	3–1	2–0	3–0	2–1	1–1	3–1	1–3	3–0	1–1	2–0	2–2	1–1	3–1	1–1	2–0	2–0	2–1	1–3	2–2	2–2	4–0	2–0	–	2–0
Washington	2–2	3–0	3–1	2–1	2–2	2–0	0–2	1–2	0–2	0–2	2–2	2–0	0–2	1–1	4–0	2–2	2–0	1–2	2–0	1–2	1–3	2–2	0–2	1–1	2–0	0–2	2–0	3–1	0–2	—

=== Game log ===
2007–08 game log
Total: 34–48 (Home: 21–20; Road: 13–28)
October: 1–0 (home: 1–0; road: 0–0)

Game	Date	Team	Score	High points	High rebounds	High assists	Location Attendance	Record
1	October 31	Chicago	W 112–103	Richard Jefferson (29)	Richard Jefferson (10)	Jason Kidd (13)	Izod Center; 17,342	1–0

November: 6–8 (home: 2–6; road: 4–2)

Game	Date	Team	Score	High points	High rebounds	High assists	Location Attendance	Record
2	November 2	Toronto	L 69–106	Richard Jefferson (27)	Richard Jefferson Vince Carter (5)	Jason Kidd (6)	Izod Center; 14,980	1–1
3	November 3	Philadelphia	W 93–88	Richard Jefferson (22)	Jason Kidd (14)	Jason Kidd (10)	Wachovia Center; 19,706	2–1
4	November 6	Atlanta	W 87–82	Richard Jefferson (25)	Jason Kidd (9)	Jason Kidd (12)	Izod Center; 12,336	3–1
5	November 8	Washington	W 87–85	Richard Jefferson (25)	Jamaal Magloire (12)	Jason Kidd (10)	Izod Center; 13,267	4–1
6	November 10	Boston	L 101–112	Richard Jefferson (28)	Jason Kidd (6)	Jason Kidd (12)	Izod Center; 18,171	4–2
7	November 12	New Orleans	L 82–84	Richard Jefferson (32)	Nenad Krstic (10)	Jason Kidd (10)	Izod Center; 12,832	4–3
8	November 14	@ Boston	L 69–91	Richard Jefferson (21)	Jason Kidd (9)	Jason Kidd (7)	TD Garden; 18,624	4–4
9	November 16	Orlando	L 70–95	Richard Jefferson (15)	Jason Kidd (19)	Jason Kidd (10)	Izod Center; 15,155	4–5
10	November 17	Miami	L 87–91	Sean Williams (22)	Jason Kidd, Sean Williams (8)	Jason Kidd (15)	Izod Center; 16,797	4–6
11	November 19	@ Utah	L 75–102	Richard Jefferson (22)	Josh Boone, Antoine Wright (5)	Jason Kidd (8)	Energy Solutions Arena; 19,911	4–7
12	November 21	@ Portland	W 106–101	Richard Jefferson (30)	Jason Kidd (11)	Jason Kidd (13)	Rose Garden Arena; 18,423	5–7
13	November 23	@ Seattle	W 98–93	Richard Jefferson (30)	Malik Allen (6)	Jason Kidd (6)	Key Arena; 14,424	6–7
14	November 25	@ L.A. Lakers	W 102–100	Richard Jefferson (27)	Jason Kidd, Sean Williams (7)	Jason Kidd (14)	Staples Center; 18,997	7–7
15	November 27	Memphis	L 103–110	Vince Carter (32)	Jason Kidd (15)	Jason Kidd (12)	Izod Center; 12,092	7–8

December: 7–8 (home: 4–5; road: 3–3)

Game	Date	Team	Score	High points	High rebounds	High assists	Location Attendance	Record
16	December 1	Philadelphia	W 94–92	Vince Carter (24)	Vince Carter (9)	Jason Kidd (8)	Izod Center; 15,133	8–8
17	December 2	@ Detroit	L 95–118	Vince Carter (22)	Sean Williams (8)	Jason Kidd (16)	The Palace of Auburn Hills; 22,076	8–9
18	December 4	@ Cleveland	W 100–79	Richard Jefferson (36)	Jason Kidd (10)	Vince Carter (7)	Quicken Loans Arena; 19,838	9–9
19	December 5	New York	L 93–100	Richard Jefferson (31)	Malik Allen (9)	Malik Allen, Vince Carter, Eddie Gill (4)	Izod Center; 15,233	9–10
20	December 7	Houston	L 89–96	Vince Carter (32)	Jason Collins (8)	Jason Kidd (7)	Izod Center; 15,421	9–11
21	December 9	@ Washington	L 89–104	Vince Carter (30)	Jason Kidd (10)	Jason Kidd (13)	Verizon Center; 13,712	9–12
22	December 11	L.A. Clippers	L 82–91	Richard Jefferson (21)	Josh Boone (14)	Jason Kidd (11)	Izod Center; 13,433	9–13
23	December 14	Cleveland	W 105–97	Vince Carter (32)	Josh Boone, Jason Kidd (8)	Jason Kidd (11)	Izod Center; 15,242	10–13
24	December 15	@ New York	L 86–94	Vince Carter (24)	Jason Kidd (7)	Vince Carter, Jason Kidd (7)	Madison Square Garden; 18,225	10–14
25	December 18	Sacramento	L 101–106	Richard Jefferson (36)	Jason Kidd (10)	Jason Kidd (9)	Izod Center; 11,902	10–15
26	December 20	@ Miami	W 107–103	Vince Carter (31)	Jason Kidd (11)	Jason Kidd (10)	American Airlines Arena; 19,600	11–15
27	December 22	Golden State	W 100–95	Richard Jefferson (31)	Josh Boone (13)	Jason Kidd (12)	Izod Center; 15,032	12–15
28	December 26	Detroit	L 83–101	Vince Carter (21)	Josh Boone (8)	Jason Kidd (13)	Izod Center; 18,005	12–16
29	December 28	Washington	W 109–106	Richard Jefferson (26)	Sean Williams (10)	Jason Kidd (12)	Izod Center; 17,644	13–16
30	December 29	@ Milwaukee	W 97–95	Vince Carter (23)	Sean Williams (10)	Jason Kidd (15)	Bradley Center; 16,562	14–16

January: 5–10 (home: 3–3; road: 2–7)

Game	Date	Team	Score	High points	High rebounds	High assists	Location Attendance	Record
31	January 2	@ Orlando	W 96–95	Vince Carter (18)	Jason Kidd (10)	Jason Kidd (10)	Amway Arena; 17,519	15–16
32	January 4	Charlotte	W 102–96	Vince Carter (30)	Jason Kidd (10)	Jason Kidd (12)	Izod Center; 15,276	16–16
33	January 5	@ Atlanta	W 113–107	Vince Carter (29)	Jason Kidd (13)	Jason Kidd (14)	Philips Arena; 15,766	17–16
34	January 8	@ Charlotte	L 99–115	Richard Jefferson (25)	Jason Kidd (11)	Jason Kidd (12)	Charlotte Bobcats Arena; 11,913	17–17
35	January 9	Seattle	W 99–88	Richard Jefferson (28)	Vince Carter (8)	Jason Kidd (11)	Izod Center; 14,101	18–17
36	January 11	Boston	L 77–86	Richard Jefferson (17)	Josh Boone (16)	Jason Kidd (9)	Izod Center; 19,990	18–18
37	January 14	Portland	L 73–99	Malik Allen (17)	Malik Allen (8)	Jason Kidd (6)	Izod Center; 14,242	18–19
38	January 16	New York	L 105–111	Vince Carter (26)	Josh Boone (12)	Jason Kidd (17)	Izod Center; 16,128	18–20
39	January 19	@ L.A. Clippers	L 107–120	Richard Jefferson (21)	Josh Boone (16)	Jason Kidd (11)	Staples Center; 18,691	18–21
40	January 20	@ Phoenix	L 92–116	Richard Jefferson (24)	Josh Boone, Vince Carter (9)	Jason Kidd (8)	US Airways Center; 18,422	18–22
41	January 22	@ Sacramento	L 94–128	Vince Carter (21)	Bostjan Nachbar (5)	Vince Carter (8)	Arco Arena; 13,232	18–23
42	January 24	@ Golden State	L 119–121	Richard Jefferson (34)	Josh Boone (17)	Jason Kidd (12)	Oracle Arena; 19,596	18–24
43	January 25	@ Denver	L 85–100	Richard Jefferson (19)	Josh Boone (14)	Jason Kidd (10)	Pepsi Center; 15,892	18–25
44	January 27	@ Minnesota	L 95–98	Richard Jefferson (35)	Sean Williams (12)	Vince Carter (5)	Target Center; 11,937	18–26
45	January 29	Milwaukee	W 87–80	Richard Jefferson (20)	Vince Carter (12)	Jason Kidd (11)	Izod Center; 14,133	19–26

February: 7–6 (home: 5–2; road: 2–4)

Game	Date	Team	Score	High points	High rebounds	High assists	Location Attendance	Record
46	February 1	@ Miami	W 94–85	Richard Jefferson (25)	Vince Carter (11)	Jason Kidd (12)	American Airlines Arena; 19,600	20–26
47	February 2	@ Atlanta	L 92–104	Richard Jefferson (23)	Jason Kidd (10)	Vince Carter (10)	Philips Arena; 18,102	20–27
48	February 5	L.A. Lakers	L 90–105	Vince Carter (27)	Bostjan Nachbar (10)	Jason Kidd (10)	Izod Center; 19,990	20–28
49	February 6	@ Orlando	L 84–100	Vince Carter (18)	Josh Boone, Jason Kidd, Antoine Wright (basketball), Nenad Krstic (6)	Jason Kidd (7)	Amway Arena; 16,011	20–29
50	February 8	@ Charlotte	W 104–90	Richard Jefferson (23)	Josh Boone, Jason Kidd (11)	Jason Kidd (13)	Charlotte Bobcats Arena; 16,319	21–29
51	February 10	Dallas	W 101–82	Vince Carter (29)	Vince Carter (9)	Jason Kidd (14)	Izod Center; 16,395	22–29
52	February 12	Minnesota	W 92–88	Vince Carter (17)	Richard Jefferson (12)	Vince Carter (10)	American Airlines Center; 19,878	23–29
53	February 13	@ Toronto	L 91–109	Vince Carter, Richard Jefferson (15)	Sean Williams (7)	Vince Carter (7)	Air Canada Centre; 19,800	23–30
54	February 20	Chicago	W 110–102	Vince Carter (33)	Josh Boone (15)	Vince Carter (7)	Izod Center; 15,150	24–30
55	February 22	@ Indiana	L 103–113	Richard Jefferson (34)	Vince Carter (6)	Vince Carter (8)	Conseco Fieldhouse; 11,930	24–31
56	February 23	Indiana	W 102–91	Richard Jefferson (36)	Josh Boone (13)	Marcus Williams (13)	Izod Center; 17,252	25–31
57	February 26	Orlando	L 92–102	Vince Carter (26)	Josh Boone (11)	Marcus Williams (8)	Amway Arena; 16,011	25–32
58	February 28	Milwaukee	W 120–106	Devin Harris (21)	Josh Boone, Stromile Swift (7)	Marcus Williams (8)	Izod Center; 14,034	26–32

March: 5–11 (home: 4–3; road: 1–8)

Game	Date	Team	Score	High points	High rebounds	High assists	Location Attendance	Record
59	March 2	San Antonio	L 83–93	Vince Carter, Devin Harris (21)	Vince Carter (8)	Marcus Williams, Devin Harris (2)	Izod Center; 18,594	26–33
60	March 4	@ San Antonio	L 70–81	Vince Carter (19)	Nenad Krstic (10)	Devin Harris (7)	AT&T Center; 17,486	26–34
61	March 5	@ Memphis	L 93–100	Richard Jefferson (22)	Nenad Krstic (9)	Marcus Williams, Devin Harris (8)	FedEx Forum; 10,218	26–35
62	March 7	@ New Orleans	L 96–107	Richard Jefferson (27)	Nenad Krstic (11)	Vince Carter (10)	New Orleans Arena; 17,255	26–36
63	March 8	@ Dallas	L 91–111	Richard Jefferson (22)	Bostjan Nachbar (9)	Vince Carter (3)	American Airlines Center; 20,399	26–37
64	March 10	@ Houston	L 73–91	Vince Carter (13)	Vince Carter, Desagana Diop (8)	Vince Carter, Desagana Diop, Richard Jefferson (3)	Toyota Center; 18,271	26–38
65	March 12	Cleveland	W 104–99	Richard Jefferson (24)	Vince Carter (8)	Vince Carter, Richard Jefferson (6)	Izod Center; 18,287	27–38
66	March 15	Utah	W 117–115	Richard Jefferson (27)	Josh Boone (13)	Devin Harris (12)	Izod Center; 16,332	28–38
67	March 18	@ Chicago	L 96–112	Vince Carter (22)	Sean Williams (6)	Vince Carter (5)	United Center; 22,070	28–39
68	March 19	Atlanta	W 125–117	Vince Carter (39)	Vince Carter (10)	Devin Harris (9)	Izod Center; 14,102	29–39
69	March 21	Denver	L 114–125	Vince Carter (32)	Josh Boone (11)	Devin Harris (13)	Izod Center; 17,949	29–40
70	March 22	@ Philadelphia	L 87–91	Vince Carter (27)	Josh Boone (11)	Vince Carter, Devin Harris (5)	Wachovia Center; 19,205	29–41
71	March 24	@ New York	W 106–91	Vince Carter (27)	Josh Boone (11)	Vince Carter (7)	Madison Square Garden; 19,763	30–41
72	March 26	Indiana	W 124–117	Josh Boone (26)	Vince Carter (14)	Devin Harris (15)	Izod Center; 15,134	31–41
73	March 28	@ Indiana	L 115–123	Vince Carter (33)	Josh Boone (16)	Devin Harris (9)	Conseco Fieldhouse; 13,282	31–42
74	March 29	Phoenix	L 104–110	Vince Carter (32)	Josh Boone (13)	Devin Harris (7)	Izod Center; 19,990	31–43

April : 3–5 (home: 2–1; road: 1–4)

Game	Date	Team	Score	High points	High rebounds	High assists	Location Attendance	Record
75	April 1	Philadelphia	L 99–108	Vince Carter (29)	Nenad Krstic (9)	Vince Carter (7)	Izod Center; 14,534	31–44
76	April 4	@ Detroit	L 87–106	Richard Jefferson (15)	Josh Boone, Richard Jefferson (5)	Richard Jefferson (5)	The Palace of Auburn Hills; 22,076	31–45
77	April 5	Toronto	W 99–90	Vince Carter (32)	Vince Carter (7)	Devin Harris (7)	Izod Center; 15,927	32–45
78	April 9	@ Cleveland	L 83–104	Vince Carter (19)	Desagana Diop (9)	Vince Carter (6)	Quicken Loans Arena; 20,063	32–46
79	April 11	@ Toronto	L 85–113	Vince Carter (21)	Vince Carter, Devin Harris, Desagana Diop, Stromile Swift (6)	Devin Harris, Richard Jefferson (5)	Air Canada Centre; 19,800	32–47
80	April 12	@ Milwaukee	W 111–98	Richard Jefferson (24)	Stromile Swift (6)	Vince Carter (10)	Izod Center; 18,717	33–47
81	April 15	Charlotte	W 112–108	Richard Jefferson (28)	Desagana Diop (7)	Vince Carter, Devin Harris (8)	Izod Center; 14,532	34–47
82	April 16	@ Boston	L 94–105	Richard Jefferson (24)	Nenad Krstic (12)	Devin Harris (7)	TD Garden; 18,624	34–48

2015–16 season schedule

== Player stats ==
Legend
GP	Games played	GS	Games started	MPG	Minutes per game
FG%	Field-goal percentage	3P%	3-point field-goal percentage	FT%	Free-throw percentage
RPG	Rebounds per game	APG	Assists per game	SPG	Steals per game
BPG	Blocks per game	PPG	Points per game

=== Regular season ===
New Jersey Nets statistics
Player	GP	GS	MPG	FG%	3P%	FT%	RPG	APG	SPG	BPG	PPG
Maurice Ager*	26	3	6.3	.323	.158	.500	.5	.3	.00	.04	2.0
Darrell Armstrong	50	2	11.0	.364	.333	.667	1.3	1.5	.56	.04	2.5
Josh Boone	70	53	25.3	.548	.000	.456	7.3	.8	.51	.87	8.2
Vince Carter	76	72	38.9	.456	.359	.816	6.0	5.1	1.22	.43	21.3
DeSagana Diop*	79	23	16.4	.522	.000	.543	5.0	.5	.33	1.11	2.9
Devin Harris*	64	61	31.6	.463	.335	.824	2.7	5.8	1.41	.16	14.8
Trenton Hassell*	63	6	12.3	.422	.222	.700	1.3	.7	.21	.05	2.0
Richard Jefferson	82	82	39.0	.466	.362	.798	4.2	3.1	.93	.26	22.6
Nenad Krstić	45	38	18.0	.410	.000	.754	4.4	.6	.20	.38	6.6
Jamaal Magloire	24	2	10.8	.306	.000	.452	3.4	0.3	0.0	0.4	1.8
Boštjan Nachbar	75	1	22.1	.402	.359	.786	3.5	1.2	0.6	0.3	9.8
Stromile Swift*	56	4	15.1	.509	.000	.670	3.6	.5	.27	.96	6.1
Marcus Williams	53	7	16.1	.379	.380	.787	1.9	2.6	.47	.06	5.9
Sean Williams	73	29	17.5	.538	.000	.609	4.4	.4	.38	1.45	5.6

*Total for entire season including previous team(s)

*Bold indicates Team leader

== Transactions ==
The Nets have been involved in the following transactions during the 2007–08 season.

=== Trades ===
February 19, 2008	To New Jersey Nets Devin Harris, DeSagana Diop, Trenton Hassell, Maurice Ager, Keith Van Horn, and 1st-round picks in the 2009 NBA draft and 2010 NBA draft	To Dallas Mavericks Jason Kidd, Malik Allen, and Antoine Wright

== See also ==
- 2007–08 NBA season
