= 2007–08 San Antonio Spurs season =

- Head coach: Gregg Popovich
- General manager: R.C. Buford
- Arena: AT&T Center

Results
- Record: 56–26 (.683)
- Place: Division: 2nd (Southwest); Conference: 3rd (Western)
- Playoff finish: Western Conference Finals (lost to Lakers 1–4)
- Stats at Basketball Reference

Local media
- Television: FSN Southwest, KENS, KMYS
- Radio: WOAI

The 2007–08 San Antonio Spurs season was the 41st season of the franchise, 35th in San Antonio, and 32nd in the National Basketball Association (NBA). The Spurs were the defending NBA champions after winning their fourth title, having swept the Cleveland Cavaliers in four games. They would once again win at least 50 games for the 9th straight season, and make the playoffs for the 11th straight season. After beating the Phoenix Suns in 5 games and the New Orleans Hornets in 7, the Spurs were eliminated by the Los Angeles Lakers in the Western Conference finals. The Lakers would go on to lose to the Boston Celtics in the NBA Finals in six games. They failed to gain back-to-back titles for the fourth time in nine years.

Following the season, Robert Horry retired after winning seven championships.

== Draft picks ==
San Antonio's selections from the 2007 NBA draft in New York City.

Round	Pick	Player	Position	Nationality	School/Club team
1	28	Tiago Splitter	Power forward/center	Brazil	TAU Cerámica (Spain)
2	33	Marcus Williams	Shooting guard	United States	Arizona
2	58	Giorgos Printezis	Small forward	Greece	Olympiacos (Greece)

== Roster ==
2007–08 San Antonio Spurs roster
Players

Pos.	No.	Player	Height	Weight	DOB	From
G/F	17	Brent Barry	6 ft 6 in (1.98 m)	185 lb (84 kg)	December 31, 1971	Oregon State
F	15	Matt Bonner	6 ft 10 in (2.08 m)	240 lb (109 kg)	April 5, 1980	Florida
SF	12	Bruce Bowen	6 ft 7 in (2.01 m)	185 lb (84 kg)	1971–06–14	Cal State Fullerton
PF	21	Tim Duncan	6 ft 11 in (2.11 m)	248 lb (112 kg)	1976–04–25	Wake Forest
SG	4	Michael Finley	6 ft 7 in (2.01 m)	215 lb (98 kg)	1973–03–06	Wisconsin
SG	20	Manu Ginóbili	6 ft 6 in (1.98 m)	210 lb (95 kg)	1977–07–28	Argentina
F/C	25	Robert Horry	6 ft 10 in (2.08 m)	240 lb (109 kg)	August 25, 1970	Alabama
F	1	DerMarr Johnson	6 ft 9 in (2.06 m)	201 lb (91 kg)	May 5, 1980	Cincinnati
C	28	Ian Mahinmi	6 ft 11 in (2.11 m)	230 lb (104 kg)	November 5, 1986	France
F/C	7	Fabricio Oberto	6 ft 10 in (2.08 m)	245 lb (111 kg)	March 21, 1975	Argentina
G	9	Tony Parker	6 ft 2 in (1.88 m)	190 lb (86 kg)	May 17, 1982	France
G	3	Damon Stoudamire	5 ft 10 in (1.78 m)	171 lb (78 kg)	1973-09-03	Arizona
F/C	40	Kurt Thomas	6 ft 9 in (2.06 m)	230 lb (104 kg)	October 4, 1972	TCU
G/F	5	Ime Udoka	6 ft 6 in (1.98 m)	215 lb (98 kg)	August 9, 1977	Portland State
G	11	Jacque Vaughn	6 ft 1 in (1.85 m)	190 lb (86 kg)	February 11, 1975	Kansas

Coaches
Head coach
- Gregg Popovich
Assistant(s)
- Brett Brown
- Mike Budenholzer
- Chip Engelland
- Chad Forcier
- Don Newman

Legend
- (DP) Unsigned draft pick
- (FA) Free agent
- (S) Suspended
- Injured

Roster
Updated: 2008-04-11

== Regular season ==
=== Standings ===
Southwest Division	W	L	PCT	GB	Home	Road	Div
y-New Orleans Hornets	56	26	.683	–	30–11	26–15	10–6
x-San Antonio Spurs	56	26	.683	–	34–7	22–19	10–6
x-Houston Rockets	55	27	.671	1	31–10	24–17	8–8
x-Dallas Mavericks	51	31	.622	5	34–7	17–24	10–6
Memphis Grizzlies	22	60	.268	34	14–27	8–33	2–14

#	Western Conference				
#	Team	W	L	PCT	GB
1	c-Los Angeles Lakers	57	25	.695	–
2	y-New Orleans Hornets	56	26	.683	1
3	x-San Antonio Spurs	56	26	.683	1
4	y-Utah Jazz	54	28	.659	3
5	x-Houston Rockets	55	27	.671	2
6	x-Phoenix Suns	55	27	.671	2
7	x-Dallas Mavericks	51	31	.622	6
8	x-Denver Nuggets	50	32	.610	7
9	Golden State Warriors	48	34	.585	9
10	Portland Trail Blazers	41	41	.500	16
11	Sacramento Kings	38	44	.463	19
12	Los Angeles Clippers	23	59	.280	34
13	Minnesota Timberwolves	22	60	.268	35
14	Memphis Grizzlies	22	60	.268	35
15	Seattle SuperSonics	20	62	.244	37

=== Game log ===
==== October ====
Record: 2–0; home: 1–0; road: 1–0

#	Date	Visitor	Score	Home	OT	Leading scorer	Attendance	Record
1	October 30, 2007	Trail Blazers	106–97	Spurs	NA	Tim Duncan (24)	18,797	1–0
2	October 31, 2007	Spurs	104–101	Grizzlies	NA	Manu Ginóbili (30)	17,538	2–0

==== November ====
Record: 12–3; home: 8–0; road: 4–3

#	Date	Visitor	Score	Home	OT	Leading scorer	Attendance	Record
3	November 2, 2007	Kings	96–80	Spurs	NA	Two-way tie (22)	17,072	3–0
4	November 6, 2007	Spurs	81–89	Rockets	NA	Manu Ginóbili (23)	18,280	3–1
5	November 7, 2007	Heat	88–78	Spurs	NA	Manu Ginóbili (25)	17,503	4–1
6	November 9, 2007	Spurs	97–85	Hornets	NA	Tony Parker (27)	15,297	5–1
7	November 11, 2007	Bucks	113–88	Spurs	NA	Manu Ginóbili (21)	17,670	6–1
8	November 13, 2007	Lakers	107–92	Spurs	NA	Tony Parker (26)	18,797	7–1
9	November 15, 2007	Spurs	92–105	Mavericks	NA	Manu Ginóbili (25)	20,468	7–2
10	November 16, 2007	Rockets	90–84	Spurs	NA	Tim Duncan (25)	18,797	8–2
11	November 20, 2007	Spurs	95–83	Hawks	NA	Tony Parker (31)	17,025	9–2
12	November 21, 2007	Magic	128–110	Spurs	NA	Tony Parker (32)	18,797	10–2
13	November 23, 2007	Grizzlies	101–88	Spurs	NA	Tim Duncan (28)	18,797	11–2
14	November 25, 2007	Spurs	116–101	SuperSonics	NA	Tim Duncan (26)	14,186	12–2
15	November 26, 2007	Spurs	99–112	Kings	NA	Tim Duncan (15)	12,587	12–3
16	November 28, 2007	Wizards	109–94	Spurs	NA	Tony Parker (29)	18,386	13–3
17	November 30, 2007	Spurs	106–91	Timberwolves	NA	Manu Ginóbili (31)	16,297	14–3

==== December ====
Record: 7–5; home: 7–2; road: 0–3

#	Date	Visitor	Score	Home	OT	Leading scorer	Attendance	Record
18	December 2, 2007	Trail Blazers	100–79	Spurs	NA	Tony Parker (27)	18,797	15–3
19	December 5, 2007	Mavericks	97–95	Spurs	NA	Manu Ginóbili (37)	18,797	16–3
20	December 7, 2007	Jazz	104–98	Spurs	NA	Manu Ginóbili (37)	18,797	17–3
21	December 11, 2007	Spurs	84–96	Warriors	NA	Matt Bonner (25)	19,827	17–4
22	December 13, 2007	Spurs	97–102	Lakers	NA	Bruce Bowen (22)	18,997	17–5
23	December 15, 2007	Nuggets	102–91	Spurs	NA	Two-way tie (21)	18,797	18–5
24	December 17, 2007	Suns	95–100	Spurs	NA	Tim Duncan (36)	18,797	18–6
25	December 19, 2007	Spurs	85–88	Grizzlies	NA	Manu Ginóbili (20)	13,260	18–7
26	December 22, 2007	Clippers	99–90	Spurs	NA	Tim Duncan (34)	18,797	19–7
27	December 26, 2007	Bulls	94–79	Spurs	NA	Tony Parker (28)	18,797	20–7
28	December 26, 2007	Raptors	73–83	Spurs	NA	Michael Finley (20)	18,797	20–8
29	December 26, 2007	Grizzlies	111–87	Spurs	NA	Two-way tie (24)	18,797	21–8

==== January ====
Record: 8–8; home: 4–3; road: 4–5

#	Date	Visitor	Score	Home	OT	Leading scorer	Attendance	Record
30	January 3, 2008	Spurs	77–80	Nuggets	NA	Two-way tie (20)	19,155	21–9
31	January 4, 2008	Knicks	97–93	Spurs	NA	Bruce Bowen (15)	18,797	22–9
32	January 6, 2008	Spurs	88–82	Clippers	NA	Tony Parker (26)	16,623	23–9
33	January 7, 2008	Spurs	121–130	Warriors	1	Tim Duncan (32)	19,107	23–10
34	January 10, 2008	Pistons	80–90	Spurs	NA	Tim Duncan (24)	18,797	23–11
35	January 12, 2008	Timberwolves	105–88	Spurs	NA	Manu Ginóbili (22)	18,797	24–11
36	January 14, 2008	Sixers	89–82	Spurs	NA	Manu Ginóbili (20)	17,609	25–11
37	January 17, 2008	Cavaliers	88–90	Spurs	NA	Manu Ginóbili (31)	18,482	25–12
38	January 19, 2008	Spurs	81–83	Rockets	NA	Tim Duncan (24)	18,353	25–13
39	January 21, 2008	Spurs	95–86	Bobcats	NA	Tim Duncan (19)	17,124	26–13
40	January 23, 2008	Lakers	103–91	Spurs	NA	Tim Duncan (28)	18,797	27–13
41	January 24, 2008	Spurs	90–89	Heat	NA	Tim Duncan (30)	19,600	28–13
42	January 26, 2008	Hornets	78–102	Spurs	NA	Two-way tie (17)	18,797	28–14
43	January 28, 2008	Spurs	91–99	Jazz	NA	Manu Ginóbili (29)	19,911	28–15
44	January 29, 2008	Spurs	85–88	SuperSonics	NA	Manu Ginóbili (29)	13,295	28–16
45	January 31, 2008	Spurs	84–81	Suns	NA	Manu Ginóbili (19)	18,422	29–16

==== February ====
Record: 10–1; home: 4–0; road: 6–1

#	Date	Visitor	Score	Home	OT	Leading scorer	Attendance	Record
46	February 5, 2008	Spurs	116–89	Pacers	NA	Tim Duncan (19)	11,288	30–16
47	February 6, 2008	Spurs	85–77	Wizards	NA	Tim Duncan (23)	20,173	31–16
48	February 8, 2008	Spurs	99–93	Knicks	1	Tim Duncan (21)	19,763	32–16
49	February 10, 2008	Spurs	90–98	Celtics	NA	Tim Duncan (22)	18,624	32–17
50	February 11, 2008	Spurs	93–88	Raptors	NA	Manu Ginóbili (34)	19,800	33–17
51	February 13, 2008	Spurs	112–105	Cavaliers	NA	Manu Ginóbili (46)	20,562	34–17
All-Star Break
52	February 19, 2008	Bobcats	85–65	Spurs	NA	Manu Ginóbili (18)	18,383	35–17
53	February 21, 2008	Spurs	100–99	Timberwolves	NA	Manu Ginóbili (44)	13,920	36–17
54	February 23, 2008	Hornets	98–89	Spurs	NA	Manu Ginóbili (30)	18,997	37–17
55	February 25, 2008	Hawks	89–74	Spurs	NA	Tim Duncan (23)	18,113	38–17
56	February 28, 2008	Mavericks	97–94	Spurs	NA	Tim Duncan (31)	18,797	39–17

==== March ====
Record: 12–6; home: 7–1; road: 5–5

#	Date	Visitor	Score	Home	OT	Leading scorer	Attendance	Record
57	March 1, 2008	Spurs	96–94	Bucks	NA	Manu Ginóbili (30)	16,974	40–17
58	March 2, 2008	Spurs	93–83	Nets	NA	Tony Parker (25)	18,594	41–17
59	March 4, 2008	Nets	81–70	Spurs	NA	Tim Duncan (29)	17,486	42–17
60	March 6, 2008	Pacers	108–97	Spurs	NA	Manu Ginóbili (28)	17,738	43–17
61	March 7, 2008	Spurs	96–109	Nuggets	NA	Manu Ginóbili (24)	19,821	43–18
62	March 9, 2008	Spurs	87–94	Suns	NA	Manu Ginóbili (22)	18,422	43–19
63	March 10, 2008	Nuggets	107–103	Spurs	NA	Tim Duncan (23)	18,797	44–19
64	March 12, 2008	Spurs	75–100	Hornets	NA	Two-way tie (24)	16,319	44–20
65	March 14, 2008	Spurs	80–84	Pistons	NA	Tony Parker (26)	22,076	44–21
66	March 15, 2008	Spurs	96–103	Sixers	NA	Tony Parker (27)	19,942	44–22
67	March 17, 2008	Celtics	91–93	Spurs	NA	Manu Ginóbili (32)	18,797	44–23
68	March 20, 2008	Spurs	102–80	Bulls	NA	Tony Parker (23)	22,353	45–23
69	March 21, 2008	Kings	102–89	Spurs	NA	Tim Duncan (21)	18,797	46–23
70	March 23, 2008	Spurs	88–81	Mavericks	NA	Manu Ginóbili (26)	20,411	47–23
71	March 25, 2008	Spurs	107–97	Magic	NA	Manu Ginóbili (28)	17,519	48–23
72	March 26, 2008	Clippers	97–88	Spurs	NA	Tim Duncan (26)	18,797	49–23
73	March 28, 2008	Timberwolves	99–84	Spurs	NA	Manu Ginóbili (26)	18,797	50–23
74	March 30, 2008	Rockets	109–88	Spurs	NA	Two-way tie (22)	18,797	51–23

==== April ====
Record: 5–3; home: 3–1; road: 2–2

#	Date	Visitor	Score	Home	OT	Leading scorer	Attendance	Record
75	April 1, 2008	Warriors	116–92	Spurs	NA	Tony Parker (26)	18,797	52–23
76	April 4, 2008	Spurs	64–90	Jazz	NA	Tony Parker (17)	19,911	52–24
77	April 6, 2008	Spurs	72–65	Trail Blazers	NA	Tim Duncan (27)	19,980	53–24
78	April 9, 2008	Suns	79–96	Spurs	NA	Tim Duncan (23)	18,797	53–25
79	April 11, 2008	SuperSonics	95–74	Spurs	NA	Tony Parker (20)	18,797	54–25
80	April 13, 2008	Spurs	85–106	Lakers	NA	Tony Parker (20)	18,997	54–26
81	April 14, 2008	Spurs	101–98	Kings	NA	Tony Parker (32)	15,334	55–26
82	April 16, 2008	Jazz	109–80	Spurs	NA	Tony Parker (24)	18,797	56–26

- Green background indicates win.
- Red background indicates loss.

== Playoffs ==
2008 playoff game log
First Round: 4–1 (home: 3–0; road: 1–1)

Game	Date	Team	Score	High points	High rebounds	High assists	Location Attendance	Series
1	April 19	Phoenix	117–115 (2OT)	Duncan (40)	Duncan (15)	Duncan, Ginóbili, Parker (5)	AT&T Center; 18,797	1–0
2	April 22	Phoenix	102–96	Parker (32)	Duncan (17)	Parker (7)	AT&T Center; 18,797	2–0
3	April 25	@ Phoenix	115–99	Parker (41)	Duncan (10)	Parker (12)	US Airways Center; 18,422	3–0
4	April 27	@ Phoenix	86–105	Parker (18)	Duncan (10)	Parker (3)	US Airways Center; 18,422	3–1
5	April 29	Phoenix	92–87	Parker (31)	Duncan (17)	Parker (8)	AT&T Center; 18,797	4–1

Conference Semifinals: 4–3 (home: 3–0; road: 1–3)

Game	Date	Team	Score	High points	High rebounds	High assists	Location Attendance	Series
1	May 3	@ New Orleans	82–101	Parker (23)	Ginóbili, Oberto (6)	Ginóbili (7)	New Orleans Arena; 18,040	0–1
2	May 5	@ New Orleans	84–102	Duncan (18)	Duncan (8)	Ginóbili (7)	New Orleans Arena; 17,927	0–2
3	May 8	New Orleans	110–99	Ginóbili, Parker (31)	Duncan (13)	Parker (11)	AT&T Center; 18,797	1–2
4	May 11	New Orleans	100–80	Duncan (22)	Duncan (15)	Ginóbili, Parker (8)	AT&T Center; 18,797	2–2
5	May 13	@ New Orleans	79–101	Ginóbili (20)	Duncan (23)	Ginóbili (7)	New Orleans Arena; 18,246	2–3
6	May 15	New Orleans	99–80	Ginóbili (25)	Duncan (15)	Duncan (6)	AT&T Center; 18,797	3–3
7	May 19	@ New Orleans	91–82	Ginóbili (26)	Duncan (14)	Ginóbili, Parker (5)	New Orleans Arena; 18,235	4–3

Conference Finals: 1–4 (home: 1–1; road: 0–3)

Game	Date	Team	Score	High points	High rebounds	High assists	Location Attendance	Series
1	May 21	@ L.A. Lakers	85–89	Duncan (30)	Duncan (18)	Parker (6)	Staples Center; 18,997	0–1
2	May 23	@ L.A. Lakers	71–101	Parker (13)	Duncan (16)	Duncan (4)	Staples Center; 18,997	0–2
3	May 25	L.A. Lakers	103–84	Ginóbili (30)	Duncan (21)	Duncan, Parker (5)	AT&T Center; 18,797	1–2
4	May 27	L.A. Lakers	91–93	Duncan (29)	Duncan (17)	Parker (9)	AT&T Center; 18,797	1–3
5	May 29	@ L.A. Lakers	92–100	Parker (23)	Duncan (15)	Duncan (10)	Staples Center; 18,997	1–4

2008 playoff schedule

== Player statistics ==
=== Regular season ===
Player	POS	GP	GS	MP	REB	AST	STL	BLK	PTS	MPG	RPG	APG	SPG	BPG	PPG
Fabricio Oberto	C	82	64	1,644	430	95	37	20	397	20.0	5.2	1.2	.5	.2	4.8
Michael Finley	SG	82	61	2,204	254	114	29	10	826	26.9	3.1	1.4	.4	.1	10.1
Bruce Bowen	SF	81	81	2,448	234	91	54	22	483	30.2	2.9	1.1	.7	.3	6.0
Tim Duncan	C	78	78	2,651	881	218	56	152	1,508	34.0	11.3	2.8	.7	1.9	19.3
Manu Ginóbili	SG	74	23	2,299	354	332	109	33	1,442	31.1	4.8	4.5	1.5	.4	19.5
Jacque Vaughn	PG	74	9	1,139	74	159	23	1	306	15.4	1.0	2.1	.3	.0	4.1
Ime Udoka	PF	73	0	1,316	228	63	56	17	423	18.0	3.1	.9	.8	.2	5.8
Tony Parker	PG	69	68	2,312	221	411	55	8	1,295	33.5	3.2	6.0	.8	.1	18.8
Matt Bonner	PF	68	3	853	192	32	14	17	326	12.5	2.8	.5	.2	.3	4.8
Robert Horry	PF	45	5	583	109	47	21	19	112	13.0	2.4	1.0	.5	.4	2.5
Francisco Elson^{†}	C	41	3	534	135	16	9	14	144	13.0	3.3	.4	.2	.3	3.5
Damon Stoudamire^{†}	PG	31	4	413	47	53	11	2	106	13.3	1.5	1.7	.4	.1	3.4
Brent Barry	SF	31	1	554	55	54	17	3	221	17.9	1.8	1.7	.5	.1	7.1
Kurt Thomas^{†}	PF	28	9	524	138	14	21	14	126	18.7	4.9	.5	.8	.5	4.5
Darius Washington Jr.	SG	18	0	146	20	15	5	0	53	8.1	1.1	.8	.3	.0	2.9
Ian Mahinmi	C	6	0	23	5	1	0	4	21	3.8	.8	.2	.0	.7	3.5
Jeremy Richardson^{†}	SG	5	1	29	1	1	1	0	10	5.8	.2	.2	.2	.0	2.0
DerMarr Johnson	SF	5	0	28	1	1	1	0	17	5.6	.2	.2	.2	.0	3.4
Bobby Jones^{†}	SF	3	0	20	2	1	2	0	2	6.7	.7	.3	.7	.0	.7
Keith Langford	SG	2	0	10	2	0	0	0	2	5.0	1.0	.0	.0	.0	1.0
Marcus Williams^{†}	SF	1	0	2	0	0	0	1	0	2.0	.0	.0	.0	1.0	.0

- ^{†} Denotes player spent time with another team in the season. Stats reflect time with the Spurs only.

=== Playoffs ===
Player	POS	GP	GS	MP	REB	AST	STL	BLK	PTS	MPG	RPG	APG	SPG	BPG	PPG
Tim Duncan	C	17	17	666	247	56	15	35	343	39.2	14.5	3.3	.9	2.1	20.2
Tony Parker	PG	17	17	654	63	103	16	1	381	38.5	3.7	6.1	.9	.1	22.4
Bruce Bowen	SF	17	17	508	33	23	11	6	104	29.9	1.9	1.4	.6	.4	6.1
Michael Finley	SG	17	11	391	33	17	5	3	114	23.0	1.9	1.0	.3	.2	6.7
Fabricio Oberto	C	17	9	331	71	20	6	5	63	19.5	4.2	1.2	.4	.3	3.7
Kurt Thomas	PF	17	8	268	84	6	2	6	69	15.8	4.9	.4	.1	.4	4.1
Manu Ginóbili	SG	17	6	559	64	67	10	5	303	32.9	3.8	3.9	.6	.3	17.8
Ime Udoka	PF	16	0	236	47	17	11	2	87	14.8	2.9	1.1	.7	.1	5.4
Brent Barry	SF	16	0	227	18	17	6	2	83	14.2	1.1	1.1	.4	.1	5.2
Robert Horry	PF	15	0	154	32	8	5	5	23	10.3	2.1	.5	.3	.3	1.5
Jacque Vaughn	PG	14	0	91	9	8	2	0	12	6.5	.6	.6	.1	.0	.9
Damon Stoudamire	PG	7	0	35	7	2	1	0	13	5.0	1.0	.3	.1	.0	1.9
Matt Bonner	PF	2	0	9	2	2	0	0	4	4.5	1.0	1.0	.0	.0	2.0

== Awards, records and milestones ==
=== Awards ===
- Tim Duncan, All-NBA Second Team
- Manu Ginóbili, All-NBA Third Team
- Tim Duncan, NBA All-Defensive First Team
- Bruce Bowen, NBA All-Defensive First Team
- Tony Parker was named the Western Conference Player of the Week for games played from November 19 through November 25.
- Head coach Gregg Popovich was named the Western Conference Coach of the Month for games played in October and November.
- Manu Ginóbili was named the Western Conference Player of the Week for games played from February 19 through February 24.

== Transactions ==
The Spurs were involved in the following transactions during the 2007–08 season.

=== Trades ===
October 29, 2007	To Minnesota Timberwolves Beno Udrih	To San Antonio Spurs Second round pick (2008)	February 20, 2008	To Seattle SuperSonics Brent Barry, Francisco Elson, First round pick (2009)	To San Antonio Spurs Kurt Thomas

== See also ==
- 2007–08 NBA season
