= Malik Allen =

American basketball player (born 1978)

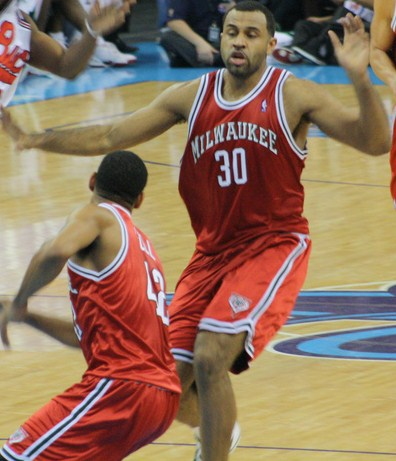

Miami Heat
- Title: Assistant coach
- League: NBA

Personal information
- Born: June 27, 1978 (age 48) Willingboro Township, New Jersey, U.S.
- Listed height: 6 ft 10 in (2.08 m)
- Listed weight: 255 lb (116 kg)

Career information
- High school: Shawnee (Medford, New Jersey)
- College: Villanova (1996–2000)
- NBA draft: 2000: undrafted
- Playing career: 2000–2011
- Position: Power forward
- Number: 35, 30
- Coaching career: 2014–present

Career history

Playing
- 2000–2001: San Diego Wildfire
- 2001–2005: Miami Heat
- 2005: Charlotte Bobcats
- 2005–2007: Chicago Bulls
- 2007–2008: New Jersey Nets
- 2008: Dallas Mavericks
- 2008–2009: Milwaukee Bucks
- 2009–2010: Denver Nuggets
- 2010–2011: Orlando Magic

Coaching
- 2014–2018: Detroit Pistons (assistant)
- 2018–2019: Minnesota Timberwolves (assistant)
- 2019–present: Miami Heat (assistant)

Career highlights
- Second-team All-Big East (2000); Fourth-team Parade All-American (1996)
- Stats at NBA.com
- Stats at Basketball Reference

Malik Omar Allen (born June 27, 1978) is an American former professional basketball player, currently serving as an assistant coach for the Miami Heat of the National Basketball Association (NBA).

== Professional career ==
After four years at Villanova University Allen went undrafted in the 2000 NBA draft. He began his career in the ABA with the San Diego Wildfire and in the International Basketball League with Trenton in 2000–01 season. On July 20, 2001, he was signed by the Miami Heat of the NBA. He stayed with the Heat until he was traded on February 24, 2005, to the Charlotte Bobcats. The Chicago Bulls signed him to a two-year deal on September 2, 2005. Over two seasons with the Bulls Allen played in 114 regular season games making 21 starts and averaged 4.5 points and 2.3 rebounds per game. On September 10, 2007, the New Jersey Nets signed Allen to a one-year contract worth US$964,636.

Allen appeared in 21 NBA Playoff games. He started all six playoff games for Chicago during '06 playoffs.

On February 19, 2008, he was traded to the Dallas Mavericks along with Jason Kidd and Antoine Wright in exchange for Keith Van Horn, Devin Harris, Trenton Hassell, DeSagana Diop, Maurice Ager, $3 million cash and 2008 and the Mavericks' 2010 first round draft pick.

On July 17, 2008, he, along with Tyronn Lue of the Dallas Mavericks, signed a contract with the Milwaukee Bucks.

On July 22, 2009, the Denver Post reported that he was set to be traded to the Denver Nuggets in exchange for Sonny Weems and Walter Sharpe. The trade was made official on July 31, 2009.

On September 16, 2010, the Orlando Sentinel reported that Allen was signed to an undisclosed deal with Orlado Magic.

Allen's final NBA game ever was Game 5 of the 2011 Eastern Conference First Round on April 26, 2011, in a 101–76 win over the Atlanta Hawks. In his final game, Allen recorded 1 point and 1 rebound. Orlando would go on to lose Game 6 and get eliminated from the playoffs 4 - 2.

== Coaching career ==
On August 7, 2014, it was announced that Allen was named an assistant coach for the Detroit Pistons. After a season with the Timberwolves, Allen accepted a position to return to the Miami Heat as an assistant coach.

== NBA career statistics ==
Legend
GP	Games played	GS	Games started	MPG	Minutes per game
FG%	Field goal percentage	3P%	3-point field goal percentage	FT%	Free throw percentage
RPG	Rebounds per game	APG	Assists per game	SPG	Steals per game
BPG	Blocks per game	PPG	Points per game	**Bold**	Career high

=== Regular season ===
Year	Team	GP	GS	MPG	FG%	3P%	FT%	RPG	APG	SPG	BPG	PPG
2001–02	Miami	12	2	13.4	.431	.000	.800	3.2	.4	.2	.7	4.3
2002–03	Miami	**80**	**73**	**29.0**	.424	.000	.802	**5.3**	.7	**.5**	**1.0**	**9.6**
2003–04	Miami	45	6	13.7	.419	.000	.758	2.6	.4	.3	.6	4.2
2004–05	Miami	14	0	17.7	.461	.000	**.929**	3.7	**.8**	.3	.8	5.9
2004–05	Charlotte	22	1	12.3	.485	.000	**.929**	2.1	.3	.2	.5	5.0
2005–06	Chicago	54	20	13.0	.490	**1.000**	.605	2.6	.4	.3	.3	4.9
2006–07	Chicago	60	1	10.6	.415	.000	.824	2.0	.3	.3	.3	4.0
2007–08	New Jersey	48	12	15.9	.475	.500	.923	2.7	.6	.3	.4	5.4
2007–08	Dallas	25	4	13.3	**.500**	.000	.917	2.7	.6	.2	.4	3.1
2008–09	Milwaukee	49	3	11.8	.429	.000	.476	2.1	.7	.1	.2	3.2
2009–10	Denver	51	3	8.9	.397	.167	.923	1.6	.3	.2	.1	2.1
2010–11	Orlando	18	0	9.9	.355	.000	.500	1.8	.2	.1	.2	1.3
Career		478	125	15.2	.439	.188	.778	2.8	.5	.3	.5	4.9

=== Playoffs ===
Year	Team	GP	GS	MPG	FG%	3P%	FT%	RPG	APG	SPG	BPG	PPG
2004	Miami	**10**	0	13.8	.449	.000	**.667**	**3.0**	.4	.2	.9	**5.0**
2006	Chicago	6	**6**	**19.3**	**.467**	.000	.000	**3.0**	**1.2**	**.3**	**1.0**	4.7
2007	Chicago	5	0	6.8	.167	.000	.000	1.4	.2	.2	.2	.8
2008	Dallas	3	0	6.0	.000	.000	.000	.0	.0	.0	.0	.0
2010	Denver	4	0	2.8	.000	.000	.000	.8	.0	.2	.0	.0
Career		28	6	11.3	.409	.000	.600	2.1	.4	.2	.6	2.9
