= 2007–08 Houston Rockets season =

- Head coach: Rick Adelman
- General manager: Daryl Morey
- Owners: Leslie Alexander
- Arena: Toyota Center

Results
- Record: 55–27 (.671)
- Place: Division: 3rd (Southwest); Conference: 5th (Western)
- Playoff finish: First Round (lost to Jazz 2–4)
- Stats at Basketball Reference

Local media
- Television: FSN Houston, My Network TV Houston

The 2007–08 Houston Rockets season was their 41st season in the National Basketball Association and 37th in Houston. The Rockets won at least 50 games for the second straight season and made the playoffs also on the back of a 22-game winning streak, the fourth longest in the history of the NBA. The Houston Rockets came into the 2007–2008 playoffs without Yao Ming, who was still injured. This injury contributed to the Rockets' elimination by the Utah Jazz in the first round (2–4). This was the second consecutive season where the Rockets had their season ended by the Jazz. The team brought back Steve Francis, but his return was short-lived as he was active for only 10 games, starting 3 of them. It would be his last season in the NBA.

Key dates prior to the start of the season:

- The 2007 NBA draft took place in New York City on 28 June.
- The free agency period began in July.

== Draft picks ==
Houston's selections from the 2007 NBA draft in New York City.

Round	Pick	Player	Position	Nationality	School/Club team
1	26	Aaron Brooks	Point guard	United States	Oregon
2	54	Brad Newley	Shooting guard	Australia	Panionios BC (Greek League)

In addition, Carl Landry was drafted as the 31st overall pick by the Seattle SuperSonics with the first pick in the 2nd round. He was traded to the Rockets for a future second round pick.

== Roster ==
2007–08 Houston Rockets roster
Players

Pos.	No.	Player	Height	Weight	DOB	From
PG	12	Rafer Alston	6 ft 2 in (1.88 m)	175 lb (79 kg)	1976-07-24	Fresno State
SF	31	Shane Battier	6 ft 8 in (2.03 m)	230 lb (104 kg)	1978-09-09	Duke
PG	0	Aaron Brooks	6 ft 0 in (1.83 m)	161 lb (73 kg)	1985-01-14	Oregon
PG	3	Steve Francis	6 ft 3 in (1.91 m)	210 lb (95 kg)	1977-02-21	Maryland
PF	19	Mike Harris	6 ft 6 in (1.98 m)	240 lb (109 kg)	1983-06-15	Rice
PF	44	Chuck Hayes	6 ft 6 in (1.98 m)	242 lb (110 kg)	1983-06-11	Kentucky
SG	2	Luther Head	6 ft 3 in (1.91 m)	185 lb (84 kg)	1982-11-26	Illinois
PG	8	Bobby Jackson	6 ft 1 in (1.85 m)	185 lb (84 kg)	1973-03-13	Minnesota
PF	14	Carl Landry	6 ft 9 in (2.06 m)	253 lb (115 kg)	1983-09-19	Purdue
SG	1	Tracy McGrady	6 ft 8 in (2.03 m)	223 lb (101 kg)	1979-05-24	Mt. Zion Christian Academy (NC)
C	55	Dikembe Mutombo	7 ft 2 in (2.18 m)	260 lb (118 kg)	1966-06-25	Georgetown
SF	20	Steve Novak	6 ft 10 in (2.08 m)	234 lb (106 kg)	1983-06-13	Marquette
PF	4	Luis Scola	6 ft 9 in (2.06 m)	245 lb (111 kg)	1980-04-30	Argentina
C	33	Loren Woods	7 ft 2 in (2.18 m)	260 lb (118 kg)	1978-06-21	Arizona
C	11	Yao Ming	7 ft 6 in (2.29 m)	310 lb (141 kg)	1980-09-12	People's Republic of China

Coaches
Head coach
- Rick Adelman
Assistant(s)
- R. J. Adelman
- T. R. Dunn
- Jack Sikma
- Elston Turner

Legend
- (DP) Unsigned draft pick
- (FA) Free agent
- (S) Suspended
- Injured

Roster
Updated: 21 March 2008

== Regular season ==
=== Standings ===
Southwest Division	W	L	PCT	GB	Home	Road	Div
y-New Orleans Hornets	56	26	.683	–	30–11	26–15	10–6
x-San Antonio Spurs	56	26	.683	–	34–7	22–19	10–6
x-Houston Rockets	55	27	.671	1	31–10	24–17	8–8
x-Dallas Mavericks	51	31	.622	5	34–7	17–24	10–6
Memphis Grizzlies	22	60	.268	34	14–27	8–33	2–14

#	Western Conference				
#	Team	W	L	PCT	GB
1	c-Los Angeles Lakers	57	25	.695	–
2	y-New Orleans Hornets	56	26	.683	1
3	x-San Antonio Spurs	56	26	.683	1
4	y-Utah Jazz	54	28	.659	3
5	x-Houston Rockets	55	27	.671	2
6	x-Phoenix Suns	55	27	.671	2
7	x-Dallas Mavericks	51	31	.622	6
8	x-Denver Nuggets	50	32	.610	7
9	Golden State Warriors	48	34	.585	9
10	Portland Trail Blazers	41	41	.500	16
11	Sacramento Kings	38	44	.463	19
12	Los Angeles Clippers	23	59	.280	34
13	Minnesota Timberwolves	22	60	.268	35
14	Memphis Grizzlies	22	60	.268	35
15	Seattle SuperSonics	20	62	.244	37

=== Game log ===
==== October ====
Record: 1–0; home: 0–0; road: 1–0

#	Date	Visitor	Score	Home	OT	Leading scorer	Attendance	Record
1	30 October 2007	Rockets	95–93	Lakers	NA	Tracy McGrady (30)	18,997	1–0

==== November ====
Record: 8–8; home: 4–3; road: 4–5

#	Date	Visitor	Score	Home	OT	Leading scorer	Attendance	Record
2	1 November 2007	Rockets	105–96	Jazz	NA	Tracy McGrady (47)	19,911	2–0
3	3 November 2007	Trail Blazers	80–89	Rockets	NA	Yao Ming (21)	18,232	3–0
4	5 November 2007	Rockets	98–107	Mavericks	NA	Tracy McGrady (35)	20,389	3–1
5	6 November 2007	Spurs	81–89	Rockets	NA	Yao Ming (28)	18,280	4–1
6	9 November 2007	Bucks	88–104	Rockets	NA	Yao Ming (28)	18,244	5–1
7	11 November 2007	Rockets	85–82	Bobcats	NA	Yao Ming (34)	11,936	6–1
8	13 November 2007	Rockets	99–105	Grizzlies	NA	Tracy McGrady (41)	12,368	6–2
9	14 November 2007	Lakers	93–90	Rockets	NA	Yao Ming (26)	18,178	6–3
10	16 November 2007	Rockets	84–90	Spurs	NA	Luis Scola (20)	18,797	6–4
11	17 November 2007	Suns	115–105	Rockets	NA	Luis Scola (20)	18,265	6–5
12	21 November 2007	Mavericks	100–94	Rockets	NA	Yao Ming (30)	18,143	6–6
13	23 November 2007	Rockets	91–98	Heat	NA	Two-way tie (20)	19,600	6–7
14	24 November 2007	Nuggets	81–108	Rockets	NA	Tracy McGrady (35)	18,228	7–7
15	26 November 2007	Rockets	88–71	Clippers	NA	Tracy McGrady (36)	15,452	8–7
16	28 November 2007	Rockets	100–94	Suns	NA	Yao Ming (31)	18,422	9–7
17	29 November 2007	Rockets	94–113	Warriors	NA	Mike James (19)	19,596	9–8

==== December ====
Record: 6–8; home: 3–3; road: 3–5

#	Date	Visitor	Score	Home	OT	Leading scorer	Attendance	Record
18	1 December 2007	Rockets	99–107	Kings	NA	Tracy McGrady (40)	15,081	9–9
19	5 December 2007	Grizzlies	92–105	Rockets	NA	Two-way tie (24)	17,723	10–9
20	7 December 2007	Rockets	96–89	Nets	NA	Yao Ming (25)	15,421	11–9
21	9 December 2007	Rockets	80–93	Raptors	NA	Tracy McGrady (23)	19,800	11–10
22	10 December 2007	Rockets	88–100	Sixers	NA	Bonzi Wells (24)	12,551	11–11
23	12 December 2007	Pistons	77–80	Rockets	NA	Tracy McGrady (29)	17,453	12–11
24	17 December 2007	Mavericks	96–83	Rockets	NA	Yao Ming (28)	18,307	12–12
25	19 December 2007	Magic	97–92	Rockets	NA	Yao Ming (19)	18,270	12–13
26	20 December 2007	Rockets	111–112	Nuggets	2	Yao Ming (26)	16,157	12–14
27	22 December 2007	Rockets	116–98	Bulls	NA	Two-way tie (20)	22,434	13–14
28	23 December 2007	Rockets	82–94	Pistons	NA	Luis Scola (18)	22,076	13–15
29	28 December 2007	Rockets	103–83	Grizzlies	NA	Two-way tie (22)	15,660	14–15
30	29 December 2007	Raptors	79–91	Rockets	NA	Yao Ming (25)	18,103	15–15
31	31 December 2007	Warriors	112–95	Rockets	NA	Rafer Alston (22)	18,153	15–16

==== January ====
Record: 10–4; home: 5–3; road: 5–1

#	Date	Visitor	Score	Home	OT	Leading scorer	Attendance	Record
32	2 January 2008	Rockets	93–97	Celtics	NA	Bonzi Wells (25)	18,624	15–17
33	4 January 2008	Rockets	96–94	Magic	NA	Yao Ming (26)	17,519	16–17
34	5 January 2008	Knicks	91–103	Rockets	NA	Yao Ming (30)	16,634	17–17
35	8 January 2008	Rockets	92–84	Wizards	NA	Luther Head (24)	16,824	18–17
36	9 January 2008	Rockets	101–92	Knicks	NA	Yao Ming (36)	19,035	19–17
37	11 January 2008	Timberwolves	82–113	Rockets	NA	Luis Scola (22)	16,223	20–17
38	13 January 2008	Hornets	87–82	Rockets	NA	Yao Ming (30)	13,599	20–18
39	15 January 2008	Sixers	111–107	Rockets	NA	Yao Ming (25)	13,428	20–19
40	19 January 2008	Spurs	81–83	Rockets	NA	Yao Ming (21)	18,353	21–19
41	21 January 2008	SuperSonics	89–96	Rockets	NA	Yao Ming (30)	15,264	22–19
42	23 January 2008	Rockets	109–107	SuperSonics	NA	Tracy McGrady (28)	12,342	23–19
43	25 January 2008	Rockets	89–79	Trail Blazers	NA	Tracy McGrady (15)	20,576	24–19
44	27 January 2008	Jazz	97–89	Rockets	NA	Tracy McGrady (21)	17,480	24–20
45	29 January 2008	Warriors	107–111	Rockets	NA	Yao Ming (36)	16,586	25–20

==== February ====
Record: 13–0; home: 8–0; road: 5–0

#	Date	Visitor	Score	Home	OT	Leading scorer	Attendance	Record
46	1 February 2008	Rockets	106–103	Pacers	NA	Carl Landry (22)	13,784	26–20
47	2 February 2008	Rockets	91–83	Bucks	NA	Tracy McGrady (33)	18,717	27–20
48	4 February 2008	Rockets	92–86	Timberwolves	NA	Tracy McGrady (26)	10,019	28–20
49	7 February 2008	Cavaliers	77–92	Rockets	NA	Yao Ming (22)	18,402	29–20
50	9 February 2008	Hawks	108–89	Rockets	NA	Yao Ming (28)	18,177	30–20
51	11 February 2008	Trail Blazers	83–95	Rockets	NA	Yao Ming (25)	14,710	31–20
52	13 February 2008	Kings	87–89	Rockets	NA	Yao Ming (25)	16,115	32–20
53	19 February 2008	Rockets	93–85	Cavaliers	NA	Rafer Alston (22)	20,562	33–20
54	21 February 2008	Heat	100–112	Rockets	NA	Tracy McGrady (23)	15,994	34–20
55	22 February 2008	Rockets	100–80	Hornets	NA	Tracy McGrady (28)	17,714	35–20
56	24 February 2008	Bulls	97–110	Rockets	NA	Tracy McGrady (24)	18,275	36–20
57	26 February 2008	Wizards	69–94	Rockets	NA	Luther Head (18)	15,768	37–20
58	29 February 2008	Grizzlies	95–116	Rockets	NA	Tracy McGrady (25)	18,105	38–20

==== March ====
Record: 11–4; home: 7–1; road: 4–3

#	Date	Visitor	Score	Home	OT	Leading scorer	Attendance	Record
59	2 March 2008	Nuggets	89–103	Rockets	NA	Tracy McGrady (22)	18,168	39–20
60	5 March 2008	Pacers	99–117	Rockets	NA	Tracy McGrady (25)	18,160	40–20
61	6 March 2008	Rockets	113–98	Mavericks	NA	Tracy McGrady (31)	20,315	41–20
62	8 March 2008	Rockets	106–96	Hornets	NA	Tracy McGrady (41)	18,279	42–20
63	10 March 2008	Nets	73–91	Rockets	NA	Tracy McGrady (19)	18,271	43–20
64	12 March 2008	Rockets	83–75	Hawks	NA	Tracy McGrady (28)	17,078	44–20
65	14 March 2008	Bobcats	80–89	Rockets	NA	Tracy McGrady (30)	18,265	45–20
66	16 March 2008	Lakers	92–104	Rockets	NA	Rafer Alston (31)	18,409	46–20
67	18 March 2008	Celtics	94–74	Rockets	NA	Luis Scola (15)	18,525	46–21
68	19 March 2008	Rockets	69–90	Hornets	NA	Tracy McGrady (15)	17,956	46–22
69	21 March 2008	Rockets	109–106	Warriors	NA	Tracy McGrady (26)	19,824	47–22
70	22 March 2008	Rockets	113–122	Suns	NA	Tracy McGrady (30)	18,422	47–23
71	24 March 2008	Kings	100–108	Rockets	NA	Rafer Alston (28)	18,241	48–23
72	26 March 2008	Timberwolves	86–97	Rockets	NA	Tracy McGrady (23)	18,269	49–23
73	30 March 2008	Rockets	88–109	Spurs	NA	Luis Scola (24)	18,797	49–24

==== April ====
Record: 6–3; home: 3–0; road: 3–3

#	Date	Visitor	Score	Home	OT	Leading scorer	Attendance	Record
74	1 April 2008	Rockets	98–99	Kings	NA	Tracy McGrady (32)	14,169	49–25
75	3 April 2008	Rockets	95–86	Trail Blazers	NA	Tracy McGrady (35)	19,980	50–25
76	4 April 2008	Rockets	79–66	Sonics	NA	Tracy McGrady (25)	14,170	51–25
77	6 April 2008	Rockets	106–96	Clippers	NA	Aaron Brooks (18)	17,932	52–25
78	9 April 2008	Sonics	80–103	Rockets	NA	Rafer Alston (18)	18,370	53–25
79	11 April 2008	Suns	90–101	Rockets	NA	Tracy McGrady (22)	18,489	54–25
80	13 April 2008	Rockets	94–111	Nuggets	NA	Luther Head (19)	19,720	54–26
81	14 April 2008	Rockets	96–105	Jazz	NA	Two-way tie (22)	19,911	54–27
82	16 April 2008	Clippers	75–93	Rockets	NA	Luis Scola (22)	18,386	55–27

- Green background indicates win.
- Red background indicates regulation loss.
- White background indicates overtime/shootout loss.

== Player stats ==
Legend
GP	Games played	GS	Games started	MPG	Minutes per game
FG%	Field-goal percentage	3P%	3-point field-goal percentage	FT%	Free-throw percentage
RPG	Rebounds per game	APG	Assists per game	SPG	Steals per game
BPG	Blocks per game	PPG	Points per game

=== Regular season ===
Player	GP	GS	MPG	FG%	3P%	FT%	RPG	APG	SPG	BPG	PPG
Rafer Alston	74	74	34.1	.394	.351	.715	3.5	5.3	1.32	.24	13.1
Shane Battier	80	78	36.3	.428	.377	.743	5.1	1.9	.96	1.13	9.3
Aaron Brooks	51	0	11.9	.413	.330	.857	1.1	1.7	.25	.10	5.2
Steve Francis	10	3	19.9	.333	.235	.565	2.3	3.0	.90	.50	5.5
Gerald Green*	30	0	12.0	.344	.385	.829	2.1	1.0	.27	.13	5.1
Mike Harris	17	0	9.4	.500	.000	.615	3.2	.2	.35	.18	3.6
Chuck Hayes	79	44	19.9	.511	.000	.458	5.4	1.2	1.08	.54	3.0
Luther Head	73	17	18.9	.432	.351	.815	1.8	1.9	.60	.12	7.6
Bobby Jackson*	72	5	19.3	.403	.358	.790	2.5	1.9	.63	.07	7.7
Carl Landry	42	0	16.9	.616	.000	.661	4.9	.5	.40	.17	8.1
Tracy McGrady	66	62	37.0	.419	.292	.684	5.1	5.9	1.03	.45	21.6
Yao Ming	55	55	37.2	.507	.000	.850	10.8	2.3	.45	2.02	22.0
Dikembe Mutombo	39	25	15.9	.538	.000	.711	5.1	.1	.28	1.23	3.0
Steve Novak	35	0	7.5	.480	.479	.750	1.0	.2	.06	.09	3.9
Luis Scola	82	39	24.7	.515	.000	.668	6.4	1.3	.73	.23	10.3
Justin Williams*	23	0	5.3	.448	.000	.308	2.1	.0	.22	.22	1.5
Loren Woods	7	0	2.4	.600	.000	.000	.1	.3	.00	.00	.9

*Total for entire season including previous team(s)

=== Playoffs ===
Player	GP	GS	MPG	FG%	3P%	FT%	RPG	APG	SPG	BPG	PPG
Rafer Alston	4	4	31.5	.438	.440	.800	1.5	4.5	1.00	.00	14.3
Shane Battier	6	6	41.0	.444	.480	.727	3.8	.5	1.00	.83	10.0
Aaron Brooks	6	0	8.3	.320	.000	.818	1.0	.5	.00	.00	4.2
Mike Harris	3	0	3.0	.500	.000	.500	.7	.0	.00	.00	1.0
Chuck Hayes	6	0	18.0	.636	.000	.000	4.7	.8	.50	1.00	2.3
Luther Head	5	0	8.8	.071	.000	1.000	.4	.8	.40	.20	.8
Bobby Jackson	6	2	23.0	.286	.208	.636	1.7	1.5	.83	.00	8.7
Carl Landry	6	0	17.7	.423	.000	.750	4.7	.0	1.17	.50	5.7
Tracy McGrady	6	6	41.2	.425	.208	.623	8.2	6.8	1.50	.83	27.0
Dikembe Mutombo	6	6	20.5	.615	.000	.636	6.5	.3	.17	1.83	3.8
Steve Novak	3	0	7.0	.750	.667	.000	.7	.0	.00	.33	2.7
Luis Scola	6	6	36.7	.448	.000	.686	9.3	1.3	.67	.17	14.0
Loren Woods	1	0	1.0	1.000	.000	.000	1.0	.0	.00	.00	2.0

== Awards and records ==
=== Awards ===
- Yao Ming, All-NBA Third Team
- Tracy McGrady, All-NBA Third Team
- Shane Battier, NBA All-Defensive Second Team
- Luis Scola, NBA All-Rookie Team 1st Team
- Carl Landry, NBA All-Rookie Team 2nd Team

=== Records ===
Starting with the 29 January 2008 win versus the Golden State Warriors, the Rockets won 22 consecutive games. The streak came to an end against the eventual champion Boston Celtics. The streak is the fourth longest winning streak in NBA history (the second longest at the time it was achieved).

== Transactions ==
The Rockets have been involved in the following transactions during the 2007–08 season.

Houston will begin the 2007–08 season with recently hired Rick Adelman as the team's 11th head coach.

Less than a week later, Scola signed with the Rockets. On 20 July guard Steve Francis signed a 2-year deal with the Rockets, after he accepted a buyout of the last two seasons of his contract, worth roughly $30 million from the Portland Trail Blazers. He is expected to compete for a starting job with Mike James and Rafer Alston

=== Trades ===
On 14 June, the Rockets traded Juwan Howard to the Minnesota Timberwolves for Mike James and Justin Reed.

On 12 July guard Vassilis Spanoulis was traded to the San Antonio Spurs along with the rights for the 2009 second-round draft pick, for center Jackie Butler and the rights to Luis Scola a 2002 second-round draft pick, yet to play in the NBA. 24 Hours after this deal was made, Scola came to a "Basic Agreement" which could see him playing for the Rockets next season.

=== Free agents ===
Player	Former team
Steve Francis	New York Knicks (via Blazers)

Player	New team
Jackie Butler	????
John Lucas III	Pallacanestro Treviso
Justin Reed	Austin Toros
Bob Sura	????

=== Court Redesign ===
On 7 September, it was announced that the Rockets will debut a new court design for the 2007–08 season. The court design includes a lighter varnished wood inside the three point area, similar to the Seattle SuperSonics, while the rest are dark varnished wood. The color red will remain on the Rockets logo, and the script. This court design is similar to the Cleveland Cavaliers, New Orleans Hornets, Phoenix Suns, and Portland Trail Blazers in which most of the hardwood is exposed.

== Playoffs ==
2008 playoff game log
First Round: 2–4 (home: 1–2; road: 1–2)

Game	Date	Team	Score	High points	High rebounds	High assists	Location Attendance	Series
1	19 April	Utah	L 82–93	Shane Battier (22)	Luis Scola (13)	Tracy McGrady (7)	Toyota Center; 18,213	0–1
2	21 April	Utah	L 84–90	Tracy McGrady (23)	Tracy McGrady (13)	Tracy McGrady (9)	Toyota Center; 18,158	0–2
3	24 April	@ Utah	W 94–92	Tracy McGrady (27)	Carl Landry (11)	Tracy McGrady (7)	EnergySolutions Arena; 19,911	1–2
4	26 April	@ Utah	L 82–86	Tracy McGrady (23)	Tracy McGrady (10)	Tracy McGrady (8)	EnergySolutions Arena; 19,911	1–3
5	29 April	Utah	W 95–69	Tracy McGrady (29)	Luis Scola (12)	Rafer Alston (6)	Toyota Center; 18,269	2–3
6	2 May	@ Utah	L 91–113	Tracy McGrady (40)	Tracy McGrady (10)	Tracy McGrady (5)	EnergySolutions Arena; 19,911	2–4

2008 schedule

== See also ==
- 2007–08 NBA season
