= 2007–08 Denver Nuggets season =

NBA professional basketball team season

- Head coach: George Karl
- General manager: Mark Warkentien
- Owner: Stan Kroenke
- Arena: Pepsi Center

Results
- Record: 50–32 (.610)
- Place: Division: 2nd (Northwest); Conference: 8th (Western)
- Playoff finish: First Round (lost to Lakers 0–4)
- Stats at Basketball Reference

Local media
- Television: Altitude Sports and Entertainment
- Radio: KCKK

The 2007–08 Denver Nuggets season was the 41st season of the franchise, 32nd in the National Basketball Association (NBA). The season saw Allen Iverson play his only full season as a Nugget until he was traded to Detroit midway through the next year. Despite winning 50 games, the Nuggets entered the playoffs as the number 8 seed in the Western Conference. They failed to make it out of the first round once again as they were swept by the eventual Western Conference Champion Los Angeles Lakers, led by league MVP Kobe Bryant, in four straight games. The Nuggets had the ninth best team offensive rating in the NBA.

== Draft picks ==
Denver did not have any draft picks.

== Roster ==
2007–08 Denver Nuggets roster
Players

Pos.	No.	Player	Height	Weight	DOB	From
SF	15	Carmelo Anthony	6 ft 8 in (2.03 m)	230 lb (104 kg)	1984-05-29	Syracuse
PG	12	Chucky Atkins	5 ft 11 in (1.80 m)	185 lb (84 kg)	1974-08-14	South Florida
C	23	Marcus Camby	6 ft 11 in (2.11 m)	235 lb (107 kg)	1974-03-22	UMass
PG	25	Anthony Carter	6 ft 2 in (1.88 m)	195 lb (88 kg)	1975-06-16	Hawaiʻi
SG	5	Yakhouba Diawara	6 ft 7 in (2.01 m)	225 lb (102 kg)	1982-08-29	Pepperdine
PG	0	Taurean Green	6 ft 0 in (1.83 m)	177 lb (80 kg)	1986-11-28	Florida
C	45	Steven Hunter	7 ft 0 in (2.13 m)	240 lb (109 kg)	1981-10-31	DePaul
SG	3	Allen Iverson	6 ft 0 in (1.83 m)	180 lb (82 kg)	1975-06-07	Georgetown
SF	11	Bobby Jones	6 ft 7 in (2.01 m)	215 lb (98 kg)	1984-01-09	Washington
SF	43	Linas Kleiza	6 ft 8 in (2.03 m)	245 lb (111 kg)	1985-01-03	Missouri
PF	4	Kenyon Martin	6 ft 9 in (2.06 m)	240 lb (109 kg)	1977-12-30	Cincinnati
PF	21	Eduardo Nájera	6 ft 8 in (2.03 m)	235 lb (107 kg)	1976-07-11	Oklahoma
PF	31	Nenê	6 ft 11 in (2.11 m)	268 lb (122 kg)	1982-09-13	Brazil
SG	1	J.R. Smith	6 ft 6 in (1.98 m)	220 lb (100 kg)	1985-09-09	St. Benedict's Prep (NJ)

Coaches
Head coach
- George Karl
Assistant(s)
- Stacey Augmon (player development)
- Adrian Dantley
- Mike Dunlap
- Tim Grgurich
- Chad Iske
- Doug Moe
- Jamahl Mosley
- John Welch

Legend
- (DP) Unsigned draft pick
- (FA) Free agent
- (S) Suspended
- Injured

Roster
Updated: April 16, 2008

== Regular season ==
=== Season standings ===
Northwest Division	W	L	PCT	GB	Home	Road	Div
y-Utah Jazz	54	28	.659	–	37–4	17–24	13–3
x-Denver Nuggets	50	32	.610	4	33–8	17–24	10–6
Portland Trail Blazers	41	41	.500	13	28–13	13–28	10–6
Minnesota Timberwolves	22	60	.268	32	15–26	7–34	3–13
Seattle SuperSonics	20	62	.244	34	13–28	7–34	6–10

#	Western Conference				
#	Team	W	L	PCT	GB
1	c-Los Angeles Lakers	57	25	.695	–
2	y-New Orleans Hornets	56	26	.683	1
3	x-San Antonio Spurs	56	26	.683	1
4	y-Utah Jazz	54	28	.659	3
5	x-Houston Rockets	55	27	.671	2
6	x-Phoenix Suns	55	27	.671	2
7	x-Dallas Mavericks	51	31	.622	6
8	x-Denver Nuggets	50	32	.610	7
9	Golden State Warriors	48	34	.585	9
10	Portland Trail Blazers	41	41	.500	16
11	Sacramento Kings	38	44	.463	19
12	Los Angeles Clippers	23	59	.280	34
13	Minnesota Timberwolves	22	60	.268	35
14	Memphis Grizzlies	22	60	.268	35
15	Seattle SuperSonics	20	62	.244	37

=== October ===
Record: 1–0; home: 1–0; road: 0–0

#	Date	Visitor	Score	Home	OT	Leading scorer	Attendance	Record
1	31 October 2007	SuperSonics	103–120	Nuggets	NA	Carmelo Anthony (32)	19,380	1–0

=== November ===
Record: 9–7; home: 6–2; road: 3–5

#	Date	Visitor	Score	Home	OT	Leading scorer	Attendance	Record
2	2 November 2007	Nuggets	99–91	Timberwolves	NA	Carmelo Anthony (33)	19,443	2–0
3	4 November 2007	Hornets	93–88	Nuggets	NA	Allen Iverson (23)	13,156	2–1
4	6 November 2007	Nuggets	112–119	Knicks	NA	Allen Iverson (32)	19,763	2–2
5	7 November 2007	Nuggets	93–119	Celtics	NA	Allen Iverson (22)	18,624	2–3
6	9 November 2007	Nuggets	118–92	Wizards	NA	Carmelo Anthony (32)	20,173	3–3
7	10 November 2007	Nuggets	113–106	Pacers	NA	Carmelo Anthony (32)	12,748	4–3
8	12 November 2007	Cavaliers	100–122	Nuggets	NA	Allen Iverson (37)	19,155	5–3
9	14 November 2007	Trail Blazers	93–110	Nuggets	NA	Carmelo Anthony (25)	13,289	6–3
10	17 November 2007	Knicks	83–115	Nuggets	NA	Carmelo Anthony (24)	19,679	7–3
11	20 November 2007	Bulls	91–112	Nuggets	NA	Carmelo Anthony (26)	17,106	8–3
12	21 November 2007	Nuggets	90–101	Clippers	NA	Allen Iverson (29)	17,221	8–4
13	23 November 2007	Timberwolves	93–99	Nuggets	NA	Carmelo Anthony (31)	17,097	9–4
14	24 November 2007	Nuggets	81–109	Rockets	NA	Allen Iverson (18)	18,228	9–5
15	27 November 2007	Pacers	112–110	Nuggets	NA	Allen Iverson (26)	13,274	9–6
16	29 November 2007	Nuggets	99–127	Lakers	NA	Carmelo Anthony (23)	18,997	9–7
17	30 November 2007	Clippers	107–123	Nuggets	NA	Allen Iverson (26)	14,230	10–7

=== December ===
Record: 8–5; home: 5–3; road: 3–2

#	Date	Visitor	Score	Home	OT	Leading scorer	Attendance	Record
18	2 December 2007	Heat	89–115	Nuggets	NA	Carmelo Anthony (30)	16,386	11–7
19	5 December 2007	Lakers	111–107	Nuggets	NA	Allen Iverson (51)	19,155	11–8
20	6 December 2007	Nuggets	122–109	Mavericks	NA	Allen Iverson (35)	20,155	12–8
21	8 December 2007	Kings	97–101	Nuggets	NA	Allen Iverson (23)	15,493	13–8
22	12 December 2007	Hornets	99–105	Nuggets	NA	Carmelo Anthony (32)	13,337	14–8
23	15 December 2007	Nuggets	91–102	Spurs	NA	Allen Iverson (30)	18,797	14–9
24	16 December 2007	Trail Blazers	116–105	Nuggets	NA	Allen Iverson (38)	13,678	14–10
25	20 December 2007	Rockets	111–112	Nuggets	2	Carmelo Anthony (37)	16,157	15–10
26	21 December 2007	Nuggets	96–99	Trail Blazers	NA	Two-way tie (34)	20,644	15–11
27	23 December 2007	Nuggets	106–105	Kings	NA	Carmelo Anthony (30)	15,055	16–11
28	26 December 2007	Bucks	105–125	Nuggets	NA	Carmelo Anthony (29)	18,701	17–11
29	28 December 2007	Nuggets	124–120	Warriors	NA	Allen Iverson (39)	20,001	18–11
30	30 December 2007	Warriors	105–95	Nuggets	NA	Carmelo Anthony (26)	19,362	18–12

=== January ===
Record: 9–6; home: 7–0; road: 2–6

#	Date	Visitor	Score	Home	OT	Leading scorer	Attendance	Record
31	3 January 2008	Spurs	77–80	Nuggets	NA	Allen Iverson (29)	19,155	19–12
32	4 January 2008	Nuggets	118–107	Timberwolves	NA	Allen Iverson (33)	13,536	20–12
33	6 January 2008	Sixers	96–109	Nuggets	NA	Allen Iverson (38)	17,476	21–12
34	7 January 2008	Nuggets	115–137	Suns	NA	Allen Iverson (32)	18,422	21–13
35	11 January 2008	Magic	103–113	Nuggets	NA	Carmelo Anthony (32)	16,718	22–13
36	14 January 2008	Nuggets	116–119	Bobcats	NA	Carmelo Anthony (35)	14,543	22–14
37	15 January 2008	Nuggets	93–104	Hawks	NA	Carmelo Anthony (36)	18,235	22–15
38	17 January 2008	Jazz	109–120	Nuggets	NA	Linas Kleiza (41)	15,270	23–15
39	19 January 2008	Timberwolves	108–111	Nuggets	NA	Allen Iverson (35)	18,196	24–15
40	21 January 2008	Nuggets	99–116	Lakers	NA	Allen Iverson (24)	18,997	24–16
41	23 January 2008	Hawks	100–107	Nuggets	NA	Allen Iverson (29)	14,213	25–16
42	25 January 2008	Nets	85–100	Nuggets	NA	Allen Iverson (30)	15,892	26–16
43	27 January 2008	Nuggets	85–90	Mavericks	NA	Allen Iverson (23)	20,437	26–17
44	28 January 2008	Nuggets	93–117	Hornets	NA	Allen Iverson (23)	15,601	26–18
45	30 January 2008	Nuggets	106–102	Grizzlies	NA	Allen Iverson (32)	12,043	27–18

=== February ===
Record: 8–5; home: 4–2; road: 4–3

#	Date	Visitor	Score	Home	OT	Leading scorer	Attendance	Record
46	2 February 2008	Bobcats	101–117	Nuggets	NA	Carmelo Anthony (25)	19,391	28–18
47	4 February 2008	Nuggets	105–103	Trail Blazers	1	Carmelo Anthony (28)	20,320	29–18
48	6 February 2008	Jazz	118–115	Nuggets	1	Allen Iverson (34)	16,865	29–19
49	8 February 2008	Wizards	100–111	Nuggets	NA	Carmelo Anthony (49)	17,078	30–19
50	10 February 2008	Nuggets	113–83	Cavaliers	NA	Carmelo Anthony (27)	20,562	31–19
51	12 February 2008	Nuggets	114–113	Heat	1	J.R. Smith (28)	19,600	32–19
52	13 February 2008	Nuggets	98–109	Magic	NA	Carmelo Anthony (32)	17,519	32–20
53	19 February 2008	Celtics	118–124	Nuggets	NA	Carmelo Anthony (29)	19,894	33–20
54	22 February 2008	Nuggets	121–135	Bulls	NA	J.R. Smith (43)	21,848	33–21
55	23 February 2008	Nuggets	109–115	Bucks	NA	Allen Iverson (26)	16,674	33–22
56	25 February 2008	Pistons	98–93	Nuggets	NA	Allen Iverson (28)	17,901	33–23
57	27 February 2008	Nuggets	138–96	SuperSonics	NA	Allen Iverson (31)	13,627	34–23
58	29 February 2008	Clippers	104–110	Nuggets	NA	Allen Iverson (38)	19,155	35–23

=== March ===
Record: 10–6; home: 7–0; road: 3–6

#	Date	Visitor	Score	Home	OT	Leading scorer	Attendance	Record
59	2 March 2008	Nuggets	89–103	Rockets	NA	Carmelo Anthony (19)	18,168	35–24
60	5 March 2008	Suns	113–126	Nuggets	NA	Allen Iverson (31)	18,383	36–24
61	7 March 2008	Spurs	96–109	Nuggets	NA	Allen Iverson (29)	19,821	37–24
62	8 March 2008	Nuggets	105–132	Jazz	NA	Allen Iverson (28)	19,911	37–25
63	10 March 2008	Nuggets	103–107	Spurs	NA	Allen Iverson (28)	18,797	37–26
64	12 March 2008	Grizzlies	86–108	Nuggets	NA	Kenyon Martin (23)	17,318	38–26
65	14 March 2008	Raptors	105–137	Nuggets	NA	Allen Iverson (28)	17,952	39–26
66	16 March 2008	SuperSonics	116–168	Nuggets	NA	Carmelo Anthony (26)	19,155	40–26
67	18 March 2008	Nuggets	120–136	Pistons	NA	Carmelo Anthony (27)	22,076	40–27
68	19 March 2008	Nuggets	113–115	Sixers	NA	Allen Iverson (32)	20,674	40–28
69	21 March 2008	Nuggets	125–114	Nets	NA	Allen Iverson (26)	17,949	41–28
70	23 March 2008	Nuggets	109–100	Raptors	NA	Allen Iverson (36)	19,800	42–28
71	24 March 2008	Nuggets	120–106	Grizzlies	NA	J.R. Smith (27)	12,317	43–28
72	27 March 2008	Mavericks	105–118	Nuggets	NA	Carmelo Anthony (32)	18,247	44–28
73	29 March 2008	Warriors	112–119	Nuggets	NA	Kenyon Martin (30)	19,844	45–28
74	31 March 2008	Nuggets	117–132	Suns	NA	J.R. Smith (23)	18,422	45–29

=== April ===
Record: 5–3; home: 3–1; road: 2–2

#	Date	Visitor	Score	Home	OT	Leading scorer	Attendance	Record
75	1 April 2008	Suns	120–126	Nuggets	NA	Allen Iverson (31)	18,870	46–29
76	5 April 2008	Kings	118–115	Nuggets	NA	Carmelo Anthony (47)	18,921	46–30
77	6 April 2008	Nuggets	147–151	SuperSonics	2	Carmelo Anthony (38)	13,104	46–31
78	8 April 2008	Nuggets	117–99	Clippers	NA	Carmelo Anthony (36)	19,060	47–31
79	10 April 2008	Nuggets	114–105	Warriors	NA	Allen Iverson (33)	20,737	48–31
80	12 April 2008	Nuggets	97–124	Jazz	NA	Allen Iverson (28)	19,911	48–32
81	13 April 2008	Rockets	94–111	Nuggets	NA	Allen Iverson (33)	19,720	49–32
82	16 April 2008	Grizzlies	111–120	Nuggets	NA	Allen Iverson (21)	17,892	50–32

- Green background indicates win.
- Red background indicates loss.

== Playoffs ==
2008 playoff game log
First round: 0–4 (home: 0–2; road: 0–2)

Game	Date	Team	Score	High points	High rebounds	High assists	Location Attendance	Series
1	April 20	@ L.A. Lakers	114–128	Anthony, Iverson (30)	Anthony (12)	Iverson (7)	Staples Center; 18,997	0–1
2	April 23	@ L.A. Lakers	107–122	Iverson (31)	Camby (17)	Iverson (6)	Staples Center; 18,997	0–2
3	April 26	L.A. Lakers	84–102	Anthony (16)	Camby (12)	Camby (4)	Pepsi Center; 19,602	0–3
4	April 28	L.A. Lakers	101–107	Smith (26)	Camby (17)	Carter (6)	Pepsi Center; 19,264	0–4

2008 playoff schedule

== Player stats ==
Legend
GP	Games played	GS	Games started	MPG	Minutes per game
FG%	Field-goal percentage	3P%	3-point field-goal percentage	FT%	Free-throw percentage
RPG	Rebounds per game	APG	Assists per game	SPG	Steals per game
BPG	Blocks per game	PPG	Points per game

=== Regular season ===
Player	GP	GS	MPG	FG%	3P%	FT%	RPG	APG	SPG	BPG	PPG
Carmelo Anthony	77	77	36.4	.492	.354	.786	7.40	3.4	1.27	.51	25.7
Chucky Atkins	24	0	14.7	.344	.316	.444	1.30	2.0	.38	.04	4.7
Marcus Camby	79	79	34.9	.450	.300	.708	13.10	3.3	1.06	3.61	9.1
Anthony Carter	70	67	28.0	.458	.349	.753	2.90	5.5	1.54	.40	7.8
Yakhouba Diawara	54	14	10.0	.410	.318	.710	1.10	.7	.15	.06	2.8
Taurean Green	9	0	3.3	.333	.333	.750	.70	.3	.11	.00	1.1
Steven Hunter	19	2	6.3	.536	.000	.450	1.50	.0	.00	.32	2.1
Allen Iverson	82	82	41.8	.458	.345	.809	3.00	7.1	1.95	.15	26.4
Bobby Jones	25	0	8.9	.406	.391	.821	1.50	.4	.20	.04	3.4
Linas Kleiza	79	13	23.9	.472	.339	.770	4.20	1.2	.56	.24	11.1
Kenyon Martin	71	71	30.4	.538	.182	.580	6.50	1.3	1.24	1.20	12.4
Jelani McCoy	6	1	5.5	1.000	.000	.500	1.20	.0	.00	.83	.5
Eduardo Nájera	78	3	21.3	.473	.361	.708	4.30	1.2	.88	.51	5.9
Nenê	16	1	16.6	.408	.000	.551	5.40	.9	.56	.88	5.3
J. R. Smith	74	0	19.2	.461	.403	.719	2.10	1.7	.84	.16	12.3

=== Playoffs ===
Player	GP	GS	MPG	FG%	3P%	FT%	RPG	APG	SPG	BPG	PPG
Carmelo Anthony	4	4	36.5	.364	.250	.828	9.50	2.0	.50	.25	22.5
Chucky Atkins	1	0	3.0	.000	.000	.000	1.00	.0	.00	.00	.0
Marcus Camby	4	4	31.0	.238	1.000	.333	13.30	3.0	1.00	3.00	3.3
Anthony Carter	4	1	15.3	.286	.000	.000	2.50	3.5	.25	.25	2.0
Yakhouba Diawara	3	0	2.7	.400	.000	.000	.30	.0	.00	.00	1.3
Steven Hunter	2	0	2.5	.000	.000	.000	1.00	.0	.00	.00	.0
Allen Iverson	4	4	39.5	.434	.214	.697	3.00	4.5	1.00	.25	24.5
Linas Kleiza	4	3	30.5	.537	.214	.692	6.50	.8	.25	.00	14.0
Kenyon Martin	4	4	29.5	.441	.000	.625	6.30	1.3	1.00	.50	8.8
Eduardo Nájera	4	0	19.5	.500	.400	.000	3.30	1.5	.75	.25	4.0
Nenê	3	0	10.0	.556	.000	1.000	2.30	.3	.67	.33	4.3
J. R. Smith	4	0	27.0	.535	.318	.833	1.80	1.8	1.00	.00	18.3

== Awards and records ==
=== Awards ===
- Marcus Camby, NBA All-Defensive First Team

== Transactions ==
=== Trades ===
September 10, 2007	To Denver Nuggets Steven Hunter; Bobby Jones	To Philadelphia 76ers Reggie Evans; Ricky Sanchez
February 21, 2008	To Denver Nuggets Taurean Green	To Portland Trail Blazers Von Wafer

=== Free agents ===
==== Additions ====
Player	Signed	Former team
Chucky Atkins	July 16	Memphis Grizzlies

==== Subtractions ====
Player	Left	New team
Steve Blake	July 13	Portland Trail Blazers
Jamal Sampson	October 1	Dallas Mavericks

== See also ==
- 2007–08 NBA season
