= 2007–08 Dallas Mavericks season =

NBA professional basketball team season

- Head coach: Avery Johnson
- President: Donnie Nelson
- General manager: Donnie Nelson
- Owner: Mark Cuban
- Arena: American Airlines Center

Results
- Record: 51–31 (.622)
- Place: Division: 4th (Southwest); Conference: 7th (Western)
- Playoff finish: First Round (lost to Hornets 1–4)
- Stats at Basketball Reference

Local media
- Television: FSN Southwest; KTXA
- Radio: KESN

The 2007–08 Dallas Mavericks season was their 28th season in the NBA. The Mavericks made the playoffs, but were eliminated in the first round for the second straight season by the New Orleans Hornets. A day later, Avery Johnson was relieved of his duties, finishing with the highest winning percentage for a coach in franchise history and replaced by former NBA Coach of the Year, Rick Carlisle. The Mavericks had the eighth best team offensive rating in the NBA.

The Mavericks acquired Jason Kidd in a mid-season trade which sent Devin Harris to the New Jersey Nets.

Key dates prior to the start of the season:

- The 2007 NBA draft took place in New York City on June 28.
- The free agency period begins in July.

== Draft picks ==
Dallas' selections from the 2007 NBA draft in New York City.

Round	Pick	Player	Position	Nationality	School/Club team
2	34	Nick Fazekas	Power forward/center	United States	Nevada
2	50	Renaldas Seibutis	Shooting guard	Lithuania	Maroussi (Greece)
2	60	Milovan Raković	Center	Serbia	Mega Ishrana (Serbia)

== Roster ==
2007–08 Dallas Mavericks roster
Players

Pos.	No.	Player	Height	Weight	DOB	From
F	30	Malik Allen	6 ft 10 in (2.08 m)	255 lb (116 kg)	1978–06–27	Villanova
G	11	José Juan Barea	6 ft 0 in (1.83 m)	175 lb (79 kg)	1984–06–26	Northeastern
PF	32	Brandon Bass	6 ft 8 in (2.03 m)	240 lb (109 kg)	1985–04–30	LSU
C	25	Erick Dampier	6 ft 11 in (2.11 m)	265 lb (120 kg)	1975–07–14	Mississippi State
F	40	Devean George	6 ft 8 in (2.03 m)	220 lb (100 kg)	1977–08–29	Augsburg
F	5	Josh Howard	6 ft 7 in (2.01 m)	210 lb (95 kg)	1980–04–28	Wake Forest
F	55	Juwan Howard	6 ft 9 in (2.06 m)	240 lb (109 kg)	1973–02–07	Michigan
G/F	6	Eddie Jones	6 ft 6 in (1.98 m)	200 lb (91 kg)	1971–10–20	Temple
G	2	Jason Kidd	6 ft 4 in (1.93 m)	210 lb (95 kg)	1973–03–23	California
G	10	Tyronn Lue	6 ft 0 in (1.83 m)	175 lb (79 kg)	1977–05–03	Nebraska
C	20	Jamaal Magloire	6 ft 11 in (2.11 m)	265 lb (120 kg)	1978–05–21	Kentucky
F	41	Dirk Nowitzki	7 ft 0 in (2.13 m)	237 lb (108 kg)	1978–06–19	Germany
F	42	Jerry Stackhouse	6 ft 6 in (1.98 m)	218 lb (99 kg)	1974–11–05	North Carolina
SG	31	Jason Terry	6 ft 2 in (1.88 m)	176 lb (80 kg)	1977–09–15	Arizona
SG	21	Antoine Wright	6 ft 7 in (2.01 m)	215 lb (98 kg)	1984–02–06	Texas A&M

Coaches
Head coach
- Avery Johnson
Assistant(s)
- Mario Elie
- Joe Prunty
- Paul Westphal
- Robert Hackett

Legend
- (DP) Unsigned draft pick
- (FA) Free agent
- (S) Suspended
- Injured

Roster
Updated: 2007-11-01

== Regular season ==
=== Standings ===
Southwest Division	W	L	PCT	GB	Home	Road	Div
y-New Orleans Hornets	56	26	.683	–	30–11	26–15	10–6
x-San Antonio Spurs	56	26	.683	–	34–7	22–19	10–6
x-Houston Rockets	55	27	.671	1	31–10	24–17	8–8
x-Dallas Mavericks	51	31	.622	5	34–7	17–24	10–6
Memphis Grizzlies	22	60	.268	34	14–27	8–33	2–14

#	Western Conference				
#	Team	W	L	PCT	GB
1	c-Los Angeles Lakers	57	25	.695	–
2	y-New Orleans Hornets	56	26	.683	1
3	x-San Antonio Spurs	56	26	.683	1
4	y-Utah Jazz	54	28	.659	3
5	x-Houston Rockets	55	27	.671	2
6	x-Phoenix Suns	55	27	.671	2
7	x-Dallas Mavericks	51	31	.622	6
8	x-Denver Nuggets	50	32	.610	7
9	Golden State Warriors	48	34	.585	9
10	Portland Trail Blazers	41	41	.500	16
11	Sacramento Kings	38	44	.463	19
12	Los Angeles Clippers	23	59	.280	34
13	Minnesota Timberwolves	22	60	.268	35
14	Memphis Grizzlies	22	60	.268	35
15	Seattle SuperSonics	20	62	.244	37

=== Game log ===
==== October ====
Record: 1–0; home: 0–0; road: 1–0

#	Date	Visitor	Score	Home	OT	Leading scorer	Attendance	Record
1	October 31, 2007	Mavericks	92–74	Cleveland	NA	Jason Terry (24)	20,562	1–0

==== November ====
Record: 10–5; home: 8–1; road: 2–4

#	Date	Visitor	Score	Home	OT	Leading scorer	Attendance	Record
2	2 November 2007	Mavericks	94–101	Hawks	NA	Dirk Nowitzki (28)	19,767	1–1
3	3 November 2007	Kings	102–123	Mavericks	NA	Josh Howard (27)	20,343	2–1
4	5 November 2007	Rockets	98–107	Mavericks	NA	Jason Terry (31)	20,389	3–1
5	8 November 2007	Mavericks	120–115	Warriors	NA	Two-way tie (24)	19,596	4–1
6	10 November 2007	Mavericks	82–91	Trailblazers	NA	Josh Howard (20)	19,255	4–2
7	13 November 2007	76ers	99–84	Mavericks	NA	Jason Terry (25)	19,875	5–2
8	15 November 2007	Spurs	105–92	Mavericks	NA	Josh Howard (23)	20,468	6–2
9	17 November 2007	Grizzlies	108–105	Mavericks	NA	Josh Howard (27)	20,385	7–2
10	20 November 2007	Raptors	105–99	Mavericks	NA	Dirk Nowitzki (32)	20,272	8–2
11	21 November 2007	Mavericks	100–94	Rockets	NA	Devin Harris (22)	18,143	9–2
12	23 November 2007	Mavericks	107–111	Pacers	NA	Devin Harris (24)	14,002	9–3
13	24 November 2007	Mavericks	95–97	Bucks	NA	Josh Howard (24)	16,376	9–4
14	26 November 2007	Wizards	110–98	Mavericks	NA	Dirk Nowitzki (31)	19,556	9–5
15	28 November 2007	Timberwolves	103–109	Mavericks	NA	Dirk Nowitzki (27)	20,054	10–5
16	30 November 2007	Trailblazers	80–91	Mavericks	NA	Josh Howard (23)	20,301	11–5

==== December ====
Record: 9–6; home: 6–2; road: 3–4

#	Date	Visitor	Score	Home	OT	Leading scorer	Attendance	Record
17	1 December 2007	Mavericks	108–112	Hornets	1	Three-way tie (19)	12,223	11–6
18	3 December 2007	Mavericks	103–98	Bulls	NA	Josh Howard (27)	21,780	12–6
19	5 December 2007	Mavericks	95–97	Spurs	NA	Josh Howard (22)	18,797	12–7
20	6 December 2007	Nuggets	122–109	Mavericks	NA	Dirk Nowitzki (32)	20,155	12–8
21	8 December 2007	Jazz	117–125	Mavericks	NA	Josh Howard (47)	20,300	13–8
22	10 December 2007	Mavericks	99–89	Knicks	NA	Dirk Nowitzki (36)	19,763	14–8
23	12 December 2007	Mavericks	76–92	Raptors	NA	Jason Terry (21)	19,800	14–9
24	14 December 2007	Hornets	80–89	Mavericks	NA	Jason Terry (25)	20,071	15–9
25	15 December 2007	Mavericks	96–83	Rockets	NA	Josh Howard (23)	18,307	16–9
26	17 December 2007	Magic	108–111	Mavericks	NA	Dirk Nowitzki (31)	20,114	17–9
27	19 December 2007	Suns	105–108	Mavericks	NA	Dirk Nowitzki (31)	20,316	18–9
28	21 December 2007	Clippers	89–102	Mavericks	NA	Dirk Nowitzki (30)	20,246	19–9
29	26 December 2007	Mavericks	90–99	Jazz	NA	Dirk Nowitzki (20)	19,911	19–10
30	27 December 2007	Cavaliers	88–81	Mavericks	NA	Two-way tie (19)	20,462	19–11
31	29 December 2007	Hawks	84–97	Mavericks	NA	Dirk Nowitzki (22)	20,338	20–11

==== January ====
Record: 11–3; home: 6–0; road: 5–3

#	Date	Visitor	Score	Home	OT	Leading scorer	Attendance	Record
32	2 January 2008	Warriors	99–121	Mavericks	NA	Dirk Nowitzki (29)	20,172	21–11
33	4 January 2008	Heat	89–94	Mavericks	NA	Dirk Nowitzki (24)	20,357	22–11
34	6 January 2008	Mavericks	101–78	Timberwolves	NA	Dirk Nowitzki (30)	17,644	23–11
35	9 January 2008	Pistons	86–102	Mavericks	NA	Dirk Nowitzki (23)	20,362	24–11
36	11 January 2008	Mavericks	90–70	SuperSonics	NA	Dirk Nowitzki (20)	12,522	25–11
37	12 January 2008	Mavericks	95–94	Clippers	NA	Dirk Nowitzki (22)	16,494	26–11
38	14 January 2008	Mavericks	120–122	Kings	NA	Two-way tie (25)	14,077	26–12
39	19 January 2008	SuperSonics	96–111	Mavericks	NA	Dirk Nowitzki (20)	20,386	27–12
40	21 January 2008	Mavericks	84–102	Wizards	NA	Josh Howard (32)	20,173	27–13
41	23 January 2008	Mavericks	102–95	Bobcats	NA	Devin Harris (23)	13,764	28–13
42	25 January 2008	Lakers	105–112	Mavericks	NA	Two-way tie (26)	20,438	29–13
43	27 January 2008	Nuggets	85–90	Mavericks	NA	Dirk Nowitzki (32)	20,437	30–13
44	28 January 2008	Mavericks	103–84	Grizzlies	NA	Josh Howard (26)	11,672	31–13
45	31 January 2008	Mavericks	90–96	Celtics	NA	Dirk Nowitzki (31)	18,624	31–14

==== February ====
Record: 8–6; home: 5–0; road: 3–6

#	Date	Visitor	Score	Home	OT	Leading scorer	Attendance	Record
46	3 February 2008	Mavericks	67–90	Pistons	NA	Two-way tie (15)	22,076	31–15
47	4 February 2008	Mavericks	107–98	Magic	NA	Josh Howard (28)	16,974	32–15
48	6 February 2008	Bucks	96–107	Mavericks	NA	Dirk Nowitzki (29)	20,079	33–15
49	8 February 2008	Grizzlies	81–92	Mavericks	NA	Dirk Nowitzki (21)	20,315	34–15
50	10 February 2008	Mavericks	82–101	Nets	NA	Dirk Nowitzki (21)	16,395	34–16
51	11 February 2008	Mavericks	76–84	Sixers	NA	Josh Howard (17)	11,728	34–17
52	13 February 2008	Trail Blazers	76–96	Mavericks	NA	Dirk Nowitzki (37)	20,159	35–17
53	14 February 2008	Mavericks	97–109	Suns	NA	Dirk Nowitzki (36)	18,422	35–18
54	20 February 2008	Mavericks	93–104	Hornets	NA	Dirk Nowitzki (31)	15,941	35–19
55	22 February 2008	Mavericks	98–83	Grizzlies	NA	Dirk Nowitzki (27)	16,245	36–19
56	24 February 2008	Mavericks	99–83	Timberwolves	NA	Dirk Nowitzki (29)	19,429	37–19
57	25 February 2008	Bulls	94–102	Mavericks	NA	Dirk Nowitzki (29)	20,340	38–19
58	28 February 2008	Mavericks	94–97	Spurs	NA	Dirk Nowitzki (28)	18,797	38–20
59	29 February 2008	Kings	106–115	Mavericks	NA	Dirk Nowitzki (34)	20,354	39–20

==== March ====
Record: 7–8; home: 5–4; road: 2–4

#	Date	Visitor	Score	Home	OT	Leading scorer	Attendance	Record
60	2 March 2008	Mavericks	104–108	Lakers	1	Dirk Nowitzki (30)	18,997	39–21
61	3 March 2008	Mavericks	110–116	Jazz	NA	Josh Howard (25)	19,911	39–22
62	6 March 2008	Rockets	113–98	Mavericks	NA	Josh Howard (21)	20,315	39–23
63	8 March 2008	Nets	91–111	Mavericks	NA	Dirk Nowitzki (34)	20,399	40–23
64	10 March 2008	Knicks	79–108	Mavericks	NA	Two-way tie (18)	20,203	41–23
65	12 March 2008	Bobcats	93–118	Mavericks	NA	Dirk Nowitzki (26)	20,279	42–23
66	14 March 2008	Pacers	97–116	Mavericks	NA	Dirk Nowitzki (21)	20,354	43–23
67	16 March 2008	Mavericks	98–73	Heat	NA	Dirk Nowitzki (21)	19,304	44–23
68	18 March 2008	Lakers	102–100	Mavericks	NA	Dirk Nowitzki (35)	20,534	44–24
69	20 March 2008	Celtics	94–90	Mavericks	NA	Josh Howard (24)	20,582	44–25
70	23 March 2008	Spurs	88–81	Mavericks	NA	Jerry Stackhouse (19)	20,411	44–26
71	25 March 2008	Clippers	90–103	Mavericks	NA	Josh Howard (32)	20,207	45–26
72	27 March 2008	Mavericks	105–118	Nuggets	NA	Josh Howard (30)	18,247	45–27
73	30 March 2008	Mavericks	104–114	Warriors	NA	Josh Howard (36)	19,852	45–28
74	31 March 2008	Mavericks	93–86	Clippers	NA	Jason Kidd (27)	17,124	46–28

==== April ====
Record: 5–3; home: 4–0; road: 1–3

#	Date	Visitor	Score	Home	OT	Leading scorer	Attendance	Record
75	2 April 2008	Warriors	86–111	Mavericks	NA	Jason Terry (31)	20,331	47–28
76	4 April 2008	Mavericks	108–112	Lakers	NA	Dirk Nowitzki (27)	18,997	47–29
77	6 April 2008	Mavericks	105–98	Suns	NA	Dirk Nowitzki (32)	18,422	48–29
78	8 April 2008	SuperSonics	83–99	Mavericks	NA	Jason Terry (22)	20,228	49–29
79	10 April 2008	Jazz	94–97	Mavericks	NA	Dirk Nowitzki (32)	20,378	50–29
80	12 April 2008	Mavericks	105–108	Trail Blazers	NA	Dirk Nowitzki (28)	19,980	50–30
81	13 April 2008	Mavericks	95–99	SuperSonics	NA	Dirk Nowitzki (32)	16,272	50–31
82	16 April 2008	Hornets	98–111	Mavericks	NA	Jason Terry (30)	20,473	51–31

- Green background indicates win.
- Red background indicates loss.

== Playoffs ==
2008 playoff game log
First Round: 1–4 (home: 1–1; road: 0–3)

Game	Date	Team	Score	High points	High rebounds	High assists	Location Attendance	Series
1	April 19	@ New Orleans	L 92–104	Dirk Nowitzki (31)	Dirk Nowitzki (10)	Jason Kidd (9)	New Orleans Arena; 17,446	0–1
2	April 22	@ New Orleans	L 103–127	Dirk Nowitzki (27)	Brandon Bass (8)	Jason Kidd (8)	New Orleans Arena; 17,855	0–2
3	April 25	New Orleans	W 97–87	Dirk Nowitzki (32)	Dirk Nowitzki (19)	Nowitzki, Terry (6)	American Airlines Center; 20,839	1–2
4	April 27	New Orleans	L 84–97	Dirk Nowitzki (22)	Dirk Nowitzki (13)	three players tied (3)	American Airlines Center; 20,644	1–3
5	April 29	@ New Orleans	L 94–99	Dirk Nowitzki (22)	Dirk Nowitzki (13)	Kidd, Terry (9)	New Orleans Arena; 18,260	1–4

2008 schedule

== Player statistics ==
=== Ragular season ===
Player	POS	GP	GS	MP	REB	AST	STL	BLK	PTS	MPG	RPG	APG	SPG	BPG	PPG
Jason Terry	SG	82	34	2,579	208	264	88	18	1,269	31.5	2.5	3.2	1.1	.2	15.5
Brandon Bass	C	79	1	1,557	347	58	22	48	654	19.7	4.4	.7	.3	.6	8.3
Dirk Nowitzki	PF	77	77	2,769	659	266	51	71	1,817	36.0	8.6	3.5	.7	.9	23.6
Josh Howard	SF	76	76	2,757	532	164	59	32	1,513	36.3	7.0	2.2	.8	.4	19.9
Erick Dampier	C	72	64	1,755	539	63	24	106	440	24.4	7.5	.9	.3	1.5	6.1
Jerry Stackhouse	SG	58	13	1,412	133	145	28	10	618	24.3	2.3	2.5	.5	.2	10.7
Devean George	SF	53	4	821	137	35	19	13	194	15.5	2.6	.7	.4	.2	3.7
DeSagana Diop^{†}	C	52	18	894	270	26	20	63	158	17.2	5.2	.5	.4	1.2	3.0
Juwan Howard	PF	50	0	353	81	17	5	2	57	7.1	1.6	.3	.1	.0	1.1
Eddie Jones	SG	47	33	922	132	69	26	8	176	19.6	2.8	1.5	.6	.2	3.7
J. J. Barea	PG	44	9	460	47	58	14	1	191	10.5	1.1	1.3	.3	.0	4.3
Devin Harris^{†}	PG	39	39	1,184	91	206	56	2	560	30.4	2.3	5.3	1.4	.1	14.4
Trenton Hassell^{†}	SG	37	6	463	44	26	9	1	76	12.5	1.2	.7	.2	.0	2.1
Jason Kidd^{†}	PG	29	29	1,011	188	276	62	11	287	34.9	6.5	9.5	2.1	.4	9.9
Malik Allen^{†}	PF	25	4	333	68	15	4	10	77	13.3	2.7	.6	.2	.4	3.1
Tyronn Lue^{†}	PG	17	0	172	13	15	0	1	64	10.1	.8	.9	.0	.1	3.8
Antoine Wright^{†}	SG	15	0	176	22	13	2	4	52	11.7	1.5	.9	.1	.3	3.5
Maurice Ager^{†}	SG	12	3	77	4	4	0	1	15	6.4	.3	.3	.0	.1	1.3
Jamaal Magloire^{†}	C	7	0	27	8	0	1	0	12	3.9	1.1	.0	.1	.0	1.7
Nick Fazekas^{†}	PF	4	0	9	3	0	0	0	4	2.3	.8	.0	.0	.0	1.0

- ^{†} Denotes player spent time with another team in the season. Stats reflect time with the Mavericks only.

=== Playoffs ===
Player	POS	GP	GS	MP	REB	AST	STL	BLK	PTS	MPG	RPG	APG	SPG	BPG	PPG
Dirk Nowitzki	PF	5	5	211	60	20	1	7	134	42.2	12.0	4.0	.2	1.4	26.8
Jason Kidd	PG	5	5	180	32	34	7	2	43	36.0	6.4	6.8	1.4	.4	8.6
Josh Howard	SF	5	5	171	35	7	2	2	63	34.2	7.0	1.4	.4	.4	12.6
Erick Dampier	C	5	5	95	21	0	1	3	18	19.0	4.2	.0	.2	.6	3.6
Jason Terry	SG	5	3	180	8	24	2	1	79	36.0	1.6	4.8	.4	.2	15.8
Jerry Stackhouse	SG	5	2	102	16	6	1	0	31	20.4	3.2	1.2	.2	.0	6.2
Brandon Bass	C	5	0	133	34	2	3	3	58	26.6	6.8	.4	.6	.6	11.6
Devean George	SF	5	0	62	15	0	2	2	29	12.4	3.0	.0	.4	.4	5.8
Eddie Jones	SG	3	0	22	3	1	1	0	6	7.3	1.0	.3	.3	.0	2.0
Malik Allen	PF	3	0	18	0	0	0	0	0	6.0	.0	.0	.0	.0	.0
Juwan Howard	PF	3	0	11	0	1	0	0	1	3.7	.0	.3	.0	.0	.3
Tyronn Lue	PG	2	0	2	1	1	0	0	0	1.0	.5	.5	.0	.0	.0
Antoine Wright	SG	1	0	7	1	0	0	0	0	7.0	1.0	.0	.0	.0	.0
J. J. Barea	PG	1	0	5	0	1	0	0	8	5.0	.0	1.0	.0	.0	8.0

== Transactions ==
The Mavericks have been involved in the following transactions during the 2007–08 season.

=== Trades ===
February 19, 2008	To Dallas Mavericks Jason Kidd, Malik Allen, and Antoine Wright	To New Jersey Nets Devin Harris, DeSagana Diop, Trenton Hassell, Maurice Ager, Keith Van Horn, and 1st-round picks in the 2009 NBA draft and 2010 NBA draft

=== Free agents ===
Player / Former team	Player / New team

== See also ==
- 2007–08 NBA season
