= 2007–08 New Orleans Hornets season =

- Division champions
- Head coach: Byron Scott
- General manager: Jeff Bower
- Owner: George Shinn
- Arena: New Orleans Arena

Results
- Record: 56–26 (.683)
- Place: Division: 1st (Southwest); Conference: 2nd (Western)
- Playoff finish: Conference Semifinals (lost to Spurs 3–4)
- Stats at Basketball Reference

Local media
- Television: Cox Sports Television
- Radio: KMEZ

The 2007–08 New Orleans Hornets season was the sixth (Note: At the time, this season was considered the 20th season in franchise history, being viewed as a relocation from Charlotte. In 2014, after this team was rebranded as the Pelicans, the name and the statistical history of the original team was reclaimed by the present day Charlotte Hornets, who had begun play in 2004 as an expansion team known as the Charlotte Bobcats.) season of the franchise in the National Basketball Association. They returned to New Orleans full-time for the first time since 2004–05. The Hornets had the sixth best team offensive rating in the NBA.

Although they declined an option to play part of this season at the Ford Center in Oklahoma City, as they did for most of the previous two seasons, they did play their first preseason game at the Ford Center on October 9 for a final curtain call.

On February 21, 2008 Bobby Jackson was traded to the Houston Rockets along with teammate Adam Haluska for Bonzi Wells and Mike James as part of a three team deal involving Houston and the Memphis Grizzlies. Also, Marcus Vinicius was traded to the Rockets where they traded him to the Memphis Grizzlies to gain the rights to Malick Badiane and Sergei Lishouk.

The Hornets finished the regular season with a record of 56–26, good enough for winning the Southwest Division. This title was clinched with their win over the Los Angeles Clippers on April 15, and marks the first division title for the franchise. Their record also ensured the 2nd seed for the Western Conference playoffs. The Hornets closed the season with a 30–11 record at home along with a 26–15 road record. It is the only season in New Orleans franchise history that they have won 50 games in a season. The Hornets' accomplishments in the season earned coach Byron Scott the NBA Coach of the Year award.

On April 29 they won game 5 of their first round playoff series vs. the 7th seeded Dallas Mavericks, thereby winning the series 4–1. This mark the first time in franchise history that they won a seven-game playoff series. In his post-season debut, Chris Paul became the first player in NBA history to have at least 30 points and 10 assists in his first two playoff games. On May 19 the Hornets' season ended after they were eliminated in game 7 by the defending champions San Antonio Spurs.

This was the first and only time a non Texas based franchise would win the Southwest Division, until 14 years later when the Memphis Grizzlies won its first division title in franchise history.

The team would not win another playoff series until the 2017-18 season where they upset the 3rd seeded Portland Trail Blazers with an astonishing sweep.

== NBA All-Star Game ==
Byron Scott was named the Western Conference Team head coach for the NBA All-Star Game on February 17, 2008. It came after the Dallas Mavericks lost to the Boston Celtics on January 31. He was the first Hornets head coach to ever coach in an NBA All-Star Game in the whole franchise history. Chris Paul and David West were also named reserves for the game. This would be the first All-Star appearance for the both of them. In addition, Peja Stojaković participated in the Three Point Shootout.

Key dates prior to the start of the season:

- The 2007 NBA draft took place in New York City on June 28.
- The free agency period begins in July.

== Draft picks ==
New Orleans' selections from the 2007 NBA draft in New York City.

Round	Pick	Player	Position	Nationality	School/Club team
1	13	Julian Wright	Forward	United States	Kansas
2	43	Adam Haluska	Shooting guard	United States	Iowa

== Roster ==
2007–08 New Orleans Hornets roster
Players

Pos.	No.	Player	Height	Weight	DOB	From
C	1	Chris Andersen	6 ft 10 in (2.08 m)	228 lb (103 kg)	1978–07–07	Blinn
C	12	Hilton Armstrong	6 ft 11 in (2.11 m)	235 lb (107 kg)	1984–11–11	Connecticut
SF	40	Ryan Bowen	6 ft 9 in (2.06 m)	220 lb (100 kg)	1975–11–20	Iowa
SF	45	Rasual Butler	6 ft 7 in (2.01 m)	205 lb (93 kg)	1979–05–23	La Salle
C	6	Tyson Chandler	7 ft 1 in (2.16 m)	235 lb (107 kg)	1982–10–02	Dominguez HS (CA)
C	33	Melvin Ely	6 ft 10 in (2.08 m)	261 lb (118 kg)	1978–05–02	Fresno State
PG	5	Mike James	6 ft 2 in (1.88 m)	188 lb (85 kg)	1975–06–23	Duquesne
SG	2	Jannero Pargo	6 ft 1 in (1.85 m)	175 lb (79 kg)	1979–10–22	Arkansas
PG	3	Chris Paul	6 ft 0 in (1.83 m)	175 lb (79 kg)	1985–05–06	Wake Forest
SG	9	Morris Peterson	6 ft 7 in (2.01 m)	220 lb (100 kg)	1977–08–26	Michigan State
SF	16	Peja Stojaković	6 ft 10 in (2.08 m)	229 lb (104 kg)	1977–06–09	Serbia
SG	24	Bonzi Wells	6 ft 5 in (1.96 m)	210 lb (95 kg)	1976–09–28	Ball State
PF	30	David West	6 ft 9 in (2.06 m)	240 lb (109 kg)	1980–08–29	Xavier
SF	32	Julian Wright	6 ft 8 in (2.03 m)	225 lb (102 kg)	1987–05–20	Kansas

Coaches
Head coach
- Byron Scott
Assistant(s)
- Kenny Gattison
- Charlie Parker
- Paul Pressey
- Darrell Walker
- Terry Kofler (trainer)

Legend
- (DP) Unsigned draft pick
- (FA) Free agent
- (S) Suspended
- (DL) On assignment to D-League affiliate
- Injured

Roster
Updated: February 21, 2008

== Regular season ==
=== Season standings ===
Southwest Division	W	L	PCT	GB	Home	Road	Div
y-New Orleans Hornets	56	26	.683	–	30–11	26–15	10–6
x-San Antonio Spurs	56	26	.683	–	34–7	22–19	10–6
x-Houston Rockets	55	27	.671	1	31–10	24–17	8–8
x-Dallas Mavericks	51	31	.622	5	34–7	17–24	10–6
Memphis Grizzlies	22	60	.268	34	14–27	8–33	2–14

#	Western Conference				
#	Team	W	L	PCT	GB
1	c-Los Angeles Lakers	57	25	.695	–
2	y-New Orleans Hornets	56	26	.683	1
3	x-San Antonio Spurs	56	26	.683	1
4	y-Utah Jazz	54	28	.659	3
5	x-Houston Rockets	55	27	.671	2
6	x-Phoenix Suns	55	27	.671	2
7	x-Dallas Mavericks	51	31	.622	6
8	x-Denver Nuggets	50	32	.610	7
9	Golden State Warriors	48	34	.585	9
10	Portland Trail Blazers	41	41	.500	16
11	Sacramento Kings	38	44	.463	19
12	Los Angeles Clippers	23	59	.280	34
13	Minnesota Timberwolves	22	60	.268	35
14	Memphis Grizzlies	22	60	.268	35
15	Seattle SuperSonics	20	62	.244	37

=== Game log ===
==== October ====
Record: 1–0; home: 1–0; road: 0–0

#	Date	Visitor	Score	Home	OT	Leading scorer	Attendance	Record
1	31 October 2007	Kings	W 104–90	Hornets	NA	Chris Paul (22)	16,188	1–0

==== November ====
Record: 10–6; home: 2–4; road: 8–2

#	Date	Visitor	Score	Home	OT	Leading scorer	Attendance	Record
2	2 November 2007	Trail Blazers	W 113–93	Hornets	NA	Chris Paul (19)	9,817	2–0
3	4 November 2007	Hornets	W 93–88	Nuggets	NA	David West (17)	13,156	3–0
4	6 November 2007	Hornets	W 118–104	Lakers	NA	Peja Stojaković (36)	18,997	4–0
5	7 November 2007	Hornets	L 90–93	Trail Blazers	NA	David West (34)	19,980	4–1
6	9 November 2007	Spurs	L 85–97	Hornets	NA	Chris Paul (18)	15,297	4–2
7	11 November 2007	Hornets	W 93–72	76ers	NA	Two-way tie (16)	10,014	5–2
8	12 November 2007	Hornets	W 84–82	Nets	NA	Chris Paul (27)	12,832	6–2
9	14 November 2007	76ers	W 95–76	Hornets	NA	Morris Peterson (27)	8,302	7–2
10	16 November 2007	Hornets	W 120–118	Grizzlies	1	David West (40)	13,271	8–2
11	17 November 2007	Hornets	W 100–82	Timberwolves	NA	Peja Stojaković (22)	15,324	9–2
12	19 November 2007	Magic	L 88–95	Hornets	NA	Peja Stojaković (21)	11,741	9–3
13	21 November 2007	Pacers	L 93–105	Hornets	NA	David West (23)	11,609	9–4
14	23 November 2007	Hornets	L 71–99	Jazz	NA	David West (18)	19,911	9–5
15	24 November 2007	Hornets	W 98–89	Clippers	NA	Peja Stojaković (22)	15,601	10–5
16	26 November 2007	Timberwolves	L 94–103	Hornets	NA	Chris Paul (31)	8,393	10–6
17	30 November 2007	Hornets	W 92–86	Hawks	NA	David West (22)	14,186	11–6

==== December ====
Record: 10–4; home: 6–2; road: 4–3

#	Date	Visitor	Score	Home	OT	Leading scorer	Attendance	Record
18	1 December 2007	Mavericks	W 112–108	Hornets	1	Chris Paul (33)	12,223	12–6
19	5 December 2007	Pistons	L 76–91	Hornets	NA	Peja Stojaković (19)	10,312	12–7
20	7 December 2007	Grizzlies	W 118–116	Hornets	1	Chris Paul (43)	10,386	13–7
21	9 December 2007	SuperSonics	W 91–88	Hornets	NA	Chris Paul (29)	10,793	14–7
22	12 December 2007	Hornets	L 99–105	Nuggets	NA	Chris Paul (30)	13,337	14–8
23	14 December 2007	Hornets	L 80–89	Mavericks	NA	Chris Paul (21)	20,071	14–9
24	15 December 2007	Suns	W 101–98	Hornets	NA	Two-way tie (21)	13,705	15–9
25	17 December 2007	Hornets	L 88–96	Trail Blazers	NA	David West (31)	15,183	15–10
26	19 December 2007	Hornets	W 107–93	SuperSonics	NA	Morris Peterson (25)	11,968	16–10
27	22 December 2007	Timberwolves	W 110–76	Hornets	NA	David West (22)	11,257	17–10
28	26 December 2007	Hornets	W 116–98	Grizzlies	NA	Chris Paul (40)	11,189	18–10
29	28 December 2007	Hornets	W 99–85	Bobcats	NA	David West (20)	18,237	19–10
30	29 December 2007	Cavaliers	W 86–76	Hornets	NA	David West (27)	17,623	20–10
31	31 December 2007	Raptors	L 92–97	Hornets	NA	David West (33)	11,444	20–11

==== January ====
Record: 12–2; home: 7–2; road: 5–0

#	Date	Visitor	Score	Home	OT	Leading scorer	Attendance	Record
32	2 January 2008	Hornets	W 95–81	Clippers	NA	David West (29)	14,965	21–11
33	4 January 2008	Hornets	W 116–104	Warriors	NA	Two-way tie (24)	19,596	22–11
34	5 January 2008	Hornets	W 118–113	Suns	NA	Chris Paul (28)	18,422	23–11
35	9 January 2008	Lakers	L 80–109	Hornets	NA	Chris Paul (32)	15,805	23–12
36	11 January 2008	Heat	W 114–88	Hornets	NA	Bobby Jackson (25)	17,133	24–12
37	13 January 2008	Hornets	W 87–82	Rockets	NA	David West (26)	13,599	25–12
38	16 January 2008	SuperSonics	W 123–92	Hornets	NA	Peja Stojaković (23)	12,882	26–12
39	18 January 2008	Bobcats	W 112–84	Hornets	NA	David West (28)	14,986	27–12
40	21 January 2008	Bucks	W 106–92	Hornets	NA	Tyson Chandler (20)	14,663	28–12
41	23 January 2008	Trail Blazers	W 96–81	Hornets	NA	Jannero Pargo (24)	16,006	29–12
42	25 January 2008	Clippers	W 111–92	Hornets	NA	Peja Stojaković (26)	16,538	30–12
43	26 January 2008	Hornets	W 102–78	Spurs	NA	David West (32)	18,797	31–12
44	28 January 2008	Nuggets	W 117–93	Hornets	NA	Chris Paul (23)	16,601	32–12
45	30 January 2008	Warriors	L 103–116	Hornets	NA	Chris Paul (28)	17,410	32–13

==== February ====
Record: 7–5; home: 4–2; road: 3–3

#	Date	Visitor	Score	Home	OT	Leading scorer	Attendance	Record
46	1 February 2008	Hornets	L 103–112	Kings	NA	Peja Stojaković (25)	14,245	32–14
47	4 February 2008	Hornets	L 88–110	Jazz	NA	Jannero Pargo (24)	19,911	32–15
48	6 February 2008	Hornets	W 132–130	Suns	2	Chris Paul (42)	18,422	33–15
49	9 February 2008	Grizzlies	W 112–99	Hornets	NA	David West (33)	17,431	34–15
50	12 February 2008	Hornets	W 100–86	Bulls	NA	Two-way tie (27)	21,739	35–15
51	13 February 2008	Hornets	W 111–107	Bucks	NA	David West (22)	14,317	36–15
52	20 February 2008	Mavericks	W 104–93	Hornets	NA	Chris Paul (31)	16,941	37–15
53	22 February 2008	Rockets	L 80–100	Hornets	NA	David West (20)	17,814	37–16
54	23 February 2008	Hornets	L 89–98	Spurs	NA	Chris Paul (27)	18,797	37–17
55	25 February 2008	Wizards	L 92–95	Hornets	NA	Chris Paul (22)	17,289	37–18
56	27 February 2008	Suns	W 120–103	Hornets	NA	David West (27)	17,988	38–18
57	29 February 2008	Jazz	W 110–98	Hornets	NA	David West (25)	17,949	39–18

==== March ====
Record: 11–4; home: 7–0; road: 4–4

#	Date	Visitor	Score	Home	OT	Leading scorer	Attendance	Record
58	2 March 2008	Hornets	L 84–101	Wizards	NA	Peja Stojaković (17)	20,173	39–19
59	3 March 2008	Hornets	W 100–88	Knicks	NA	Chris Paul (27)	18,467	40–19
60	5 March 2008	Hawks	W 116–101	Hornets	NA	Peja Stojaković (29)	17,430	41–19
61	7 March 2008	Nets	W 107–96	Hornets	NA	Chris Paul (25)	17,225	42–19
62	8 March 2008	Hornets	L 96–106	Rockets	NA	Chris Paul (37)	18,279	42–20
63	12 March 2008	Spurs	W 100–75	Hornets	NA	David West (29)	17,419	43–20
64	14 March 2008	Lakers	W 108–98	Hornets	NA	Chris Paul (27)	18,299	44–20
65	16 March 2008	Hornets	L 84–105	Pistons	NA	Peja Stojaković (21)	22,076	44–21
66	17 March 2008	Bulls	W 108–97	Hornets	NA	Chris Paul (37)	17,337	45–21
67	19 March 2008	Rockets	W 90–69	Hornets	NA	Bonzi Wells (25)	18,056	46–21
68	22 March 2008	Celtics	W 113–106	Hornets	NA	David West (37)	18,380	47–21
69	25 March 2008	Hornets	W 114–106	Pacers	NA	David West (35)	10,829	48–21
70	26 March 2008	Hornets	W 100–99	Cavaliers	NA	Peja Stojaković (25)	20,562	49–21
71	28 March 2008	Hornets	L 92–112	Celtics	NA	Chris Paul (22)	18,624	49–22
72	30 March 2008	Hornets	W 118–111	Raptors	NA	David West (32)	19,800	50–22

==== April ====
Record: 6-4; home: 3-1; road: 3–3

#	Date	Visitor	Score	Home	OT	Leading scorer	Attendance	Record
73	1 April 2008	Hornets	W 98–97	Magic	NA	Two-way tie (19)	17,519	51–22
74	2 April 2008	Hornets	W 106–77	Heat	NA	David West (22)	19,122	52–22
75	4 April 2008	Knicks	W 118–110	Hornets	NA	Chris Paul (33)	17,779	53–22
76	6 April 2008	Warriors	W 108–96	Hornets	NA	Two-way tie (25)	17,909	54–22
77	8 April 2008	Jazz	L 66–77	Hornets	NA	Peja Stojaković (15)	17,365	54–23
78	9 April 2008	Hornets	W 122–90	Timberwolves	NA	Peja Stojaković (24)	17,265	55–23
79	11 April 2008	Hornets	L 104–107	Lakers	NA	Peja Stojaković (24)	18,977	55–24
80	12 April 2008	Hornets	L 91–94	Kings	NA	David West (30)	14,965	55–25
81	15 April 2008	Clippers	W 114–92	Hornets	NA	David West (32)	17,388	56–25
82	16 April 2008	Hornets	L 98–111	Mavericks	NA	David West (26)	20,473	56–26

- Green background indicates win.
- Red background indicates loss.

== Playoffs ==
2008 playoff game log
First Round: 4–1 (home: 3–0; road: 1–1)

Game	Date	Team	Score	High points	High rebounds	High assists	Location Attendance	Series
1	April 19	Dallas	104–92	Paul (35)	Chandler (15)	Paul (10)	New Orleans Arena; 17,446	1–0
2	April 22	Dallas	127–103	Paul (32)	Chandler (11)	Paul (17)	New Orleans Arena; 17,855	2–0
3	April 25	@ Dallas	87–97	Pargo (30)	Chandler (11)	Paul (10)	American Airlines Center; 20,839	2–1
4	April 27	@ Dallas	97–84	West (24)	West (9)	Paul (8)	American Airlines Center; 20,644	3–1
5	April 29	Dallas	99–94	West (25)	Chandler (14)	Paul (15)	New Orleans Arena; 18,260	4–1

Conference Semifinals: 3–4 (home: 3–1; road: 0–3)

Game	Date	Team	Score	High points	High rebounds	High assists	Location Attendance	Series
1	May 3	San Antonio	101–82	West (30)	Chandler (15)	Paul (13)	New Orleans Arena; 18,040	1–0
2	May 5	San Antonio	102–84	Paul (30)	Chandler (11)	Paul (12)	New Orleans Arena; 17,927	2–0
3	May 8	@ San Antonio	99–110	Paul (35)	West (12)	Paul (9)	AT&T Center; 18,797	2–1
4	May 11	@ San Antonio	80–100	Paul (23)	Armstrong, Paul (6)	Paul (5)	AT&T Center; 18,797	2–2
5	May 13	San Antonio	101–79	West (38)	West (14)	Paul (14)	New Orleans Arena; 18,246	3–2
6	May 15	@ San Antonio	80–99	Paul (21)	Five-way tie (6)	Paul (8)	AT&T Center; 18,797	3–3
7	May 19	San Antonio	82–91	West (20)	Chandler (15)	Paul (14)	New Orleans Arena; 18,235	3–4

2008 playoff schedule

== Player statistics ==
Legend
GP	Games played	GS	Games started	MPG	Minutes per game
FG%	Field-goal percentage	3P%	3-point field-goal percentage	FT%	Free-throw percentage
RPG	Rebounds per game	APG	Assists per game	SPG	Steals per game
BPG	Blocks per game	PPG	Points per game

=== Regular season ===
Player	GP	GS	MPG	FG%	3P%	FT%	RPG	APG	SPG	BPG	PPG
Chris Andersen	5	0	6.8	.286	.000	.500	1.8	.0	.00	.80	1.2
Hilton Armstrong	65	3	11.3	.453	.000	.629	2.5	.4	.23	.52	2.7
Ryan Bowen	53	4	12.5	.490	.000	.552	1.9	.5	.60	.21	2.2
Rasual Butler	51	8	17.2	.350	.331	.839	2.0	.7	.29	.41	4.9
Tyson Chandler	79	79	35.2	.623	.000	.593	11.7	1.0	.57	1.06	11.8
Melvin Ely	52	1	11.9	.472	.000	.552	2.8	.4	.13	.35	3.9
Mike James*	54	1	13.3	.348	.320	.813	1.3	1.1	.39	.04	5.0
Jannero Pargo	80	5	18.7	.390	.349	.877	1.6	2.4	.63	.06	8.1
Chris Paul	80	80	37.6	.488	.369	.851	4.0	11.6	2.71	.05	21.1
Morris Peterson	76	76	23.6	.417	.394	.765	2.7	.9	.62	.09	8.0
Predrag Stojaković	77	77	35.2	.440	.441	.929	4.3	1.2	.74	.13	16.4
Bonzi Wells*	73	7	21.4	.443	.240	.643	4.5	1.3	1.03	.44	9.1
David West	76	76	37.8	.482	.240	.850	8.9	2.3	.82	1.30	20.6
Julian Wright	57	1	11.2	.533	.417	.635	2.1	.7	.51	.21	3.9

*Total for entire season including previous team(s)

=== Playoffs ===
Player	GP	GS	MPG	FG%	3P%	FT%	RPG	APG	SPG	BPG	PPG
Hilton Armstrong	8	0	9.0	.615	.000	.500	2.5	.0	.00	.75	2.6
Ryan Bowen	9	0	4.3	.167	.000	1.000	1.6	.2	.11	.00	.4
Tyson Chandler	11	11	33.5	.617	.000	.643	9.8	.4	.45	1.73	7.5
Melvin Ely	6	0	9.2	.308	.000	.750	1.7	.2	.00	.00	2.3
Mike James	4	0	7.0	.333	.400	1.000	.3	.3	.50	.00	3.0
Jannero Pargo	11	0	21.7	.390	.351	.650	2.4	2.4	.91	.18	9.5
Chris Paul	11	11	39.8	.507	.250	.811	4.6	11.0	2.09	.18	24.6
Morris Peterson	11	11	23.0	.508	.500	.667	2.7	.6	.45	.27	7.4
Predrag Stojaković	11	11	37.3	.451	.587	.926	5.5	.5	.55	.09	14.7
Bonzi Wells	11	0	15.0	.393	.000	.000	2.8	.7	.27	.27	4.0
David West	11	11	39.9	.470	1.000	.882	8.5	3.0	1.09	2.00	21.3
Julian Wright	11	0	11.9	.455	.222	.833	1.6	.5	.91	.09	4.3

== Awards and records ==
=== Awards ===
- Byron Scott, NBA Coach of the Year Award
- Chris Paul, All-NBA First Team
- Chris Paul, NBA All-Defensive Second Team

=== Records ===
==== Season ====
- The Hornets set franchise records in wins (56) and road wins (26).
- Chris Paul set franchise records in:
  - double-doubles (56)
  - total assists (925)
  - total steals (217)
  - 10 or more assists (59)

==== Playoffs ====
- In Game 2 vs. the Mavericks, the Hornets set franchise marks in:
  - Most points in a quarter: 39 in 1st
  - Most points in a half: 67 in 1st
  - Most points in a game: 127
  - Most 3-pt FG made (team): 10
  - Most assists in game: Chris Paul, 17
  - total points: 127
  - Chris Paul set a franchise record 17 assists in Game 2 against the Dallas Mavericks.

=== Milestones ===
- The Hornets won their first-ever division title in franchise history (including the tenure in Charlotte.).
- Byron Scott became the Hornets first Coach of the Year recipient.

==== Playoffs ====
- The Hornets won their first playoff series since moving to New Orleans in 2002.
- Chris Paul averaged 24 points, 12 assists and 2 steals in the five-game first round series vs the Mavericks, becoming the sixth player and first in 17 years to do so.

• Paul first player in history with back-to-back 30-pt, 10-ast, 3-steal games. Also first player in history with 30 points and 10 assists in first two career playoff games.

== Transactions ==
The Hornets have been involved in the following transactions during the 2007–08 season.

=== Trades ===
February 21, 2007	To New Orleans Hornets Mike James and Bonzi Wells	To Houston Rockets Bobby Jackson, Adam Haluska, and a second round draft pick	To Memphis Grizzlies Marcus Vinicius, cash, as well as the draft rights to Sergei Lishchuk and Malick Badiane

=== Free agents ===
Player	Former team
Melvin Ely	San Antonio Spurs
Morris Peterson	Toronto Raptors

Player	New team
Brandon Bass	Dallas Mavericks
Devin Brown	Cleveland Cavaliers
Desmond Mason	Milwaukee Bucks

== See also ==
- 2007–08 NBA season
