= Sean Marks =

New Zealand-American basketball executive (born 1975)

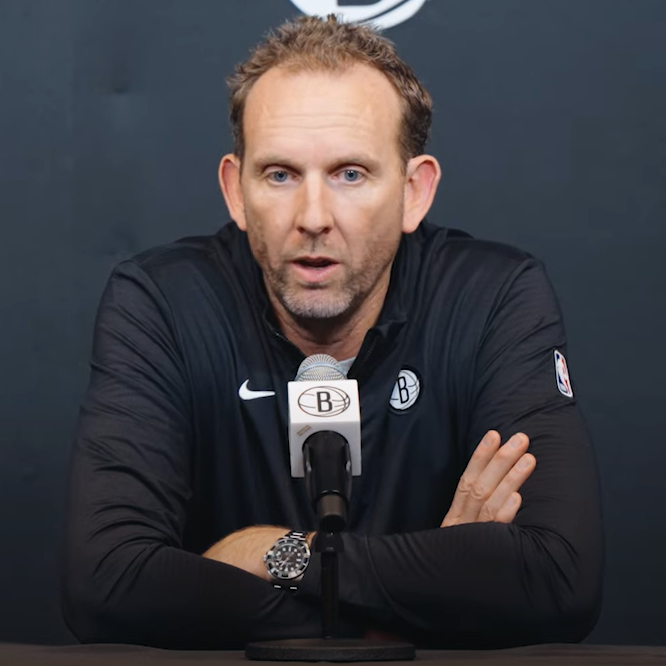
- Marks in 2025

Brooklyn Nets
- Title: General manager
- League: NBA

Personal information
- Born: 23 August 1975 (age 51) Auckland, New Zealand
- Listed height: 6 ft 10 in (2.08 m)
- Listed weight: 250 lb (113 kg)

Career information
- High school: Rangitoto College (Auckland, New Zealand)
- College: California (1994–1998)
- NBA draft: 1998: 2nd round, 44th overall pick
- Drafted by: New York Knicks
- Playing career: 1998–2011
- Position: Power forward / center
- Number: 22, 4, 40
- Coaching career: 2013–2014

Career history

Playing
- 1998–2000: Toronto Raptors
- 2000–2001: Śląsk Wrocław
- 2001–2003: Miami Heat
- 2003–2006: San Antonio Spurs
- 2006–2008: Phoenix Suns
- 2008–2010: New Orleans Hornets
- 2010–2011: Portland Trail Blazers

Career highlights
- As player: NBA champion (2005); Polish League champion (2001); As assistant coach: NBA champion (2014)

Career statistics
- Points: 638 (2.8 ppg)
- Rebounds: 501 (2.2 rpg)
- Blocks: 87 (0.4 bpg)
- Stats at NBA.com
- Stats at Basketball Reference

Sean Andrew Marks (born 23 August 1975) is a New Zealand-American basketball executive and former player and coach who is the general manager of the Brooklyn Nets of the National Basketball Association (NBA). He was the first New Zealand-born player to play in the NBA. Marks won two championships with the San Antonio Spurs: one as a player in 2005 and another as an assistant coach in 2014.

== Basketball career ==
After attending Rangitoto College in Auckland, Marks moved to the United States in 1992 to play for the University of California, Berkeley where he majored in political science, graduating with a BA degree in 1998. He was drafted 44th overall in the 1998 NBA draft by the New York Knicks, and was traded on draft night, alongside Charles Oakley, to the Toronto Raptors for Marcus Camby. Marks would later play for the Miami Heat and San Antonio Spurs.

In 2000–01, Marks started the season with Śląsk Wrocław of Poland, and in December 2000 had an unsuccessful ten-day contract (0 games) with the Seattle SuperSonics, returning to his Polish team until the season ended. In 2003–04, while with the Spurs, he did not play a single second due to patella tendonitis.

In the next season, while playing for the Spurs, Marks averaged 10 minutes per game and produced an average of 3 points and 2 rebounds. That year the Spurs won the NBA championship by defeating the Detroit Pistons in seven games. Marks did not receive any playing time for the Spurs during the 2005 playoffs.

Marks signed with the Phoenix Suns on 27 July 2006, to a one-year contract, On 16 April 2008, during a win over the Portland Trail Blazers in the Suns last regular-season game, Marks scored a double-double with 16 points and 13 rebounds, along with 1 steal and 1 block.

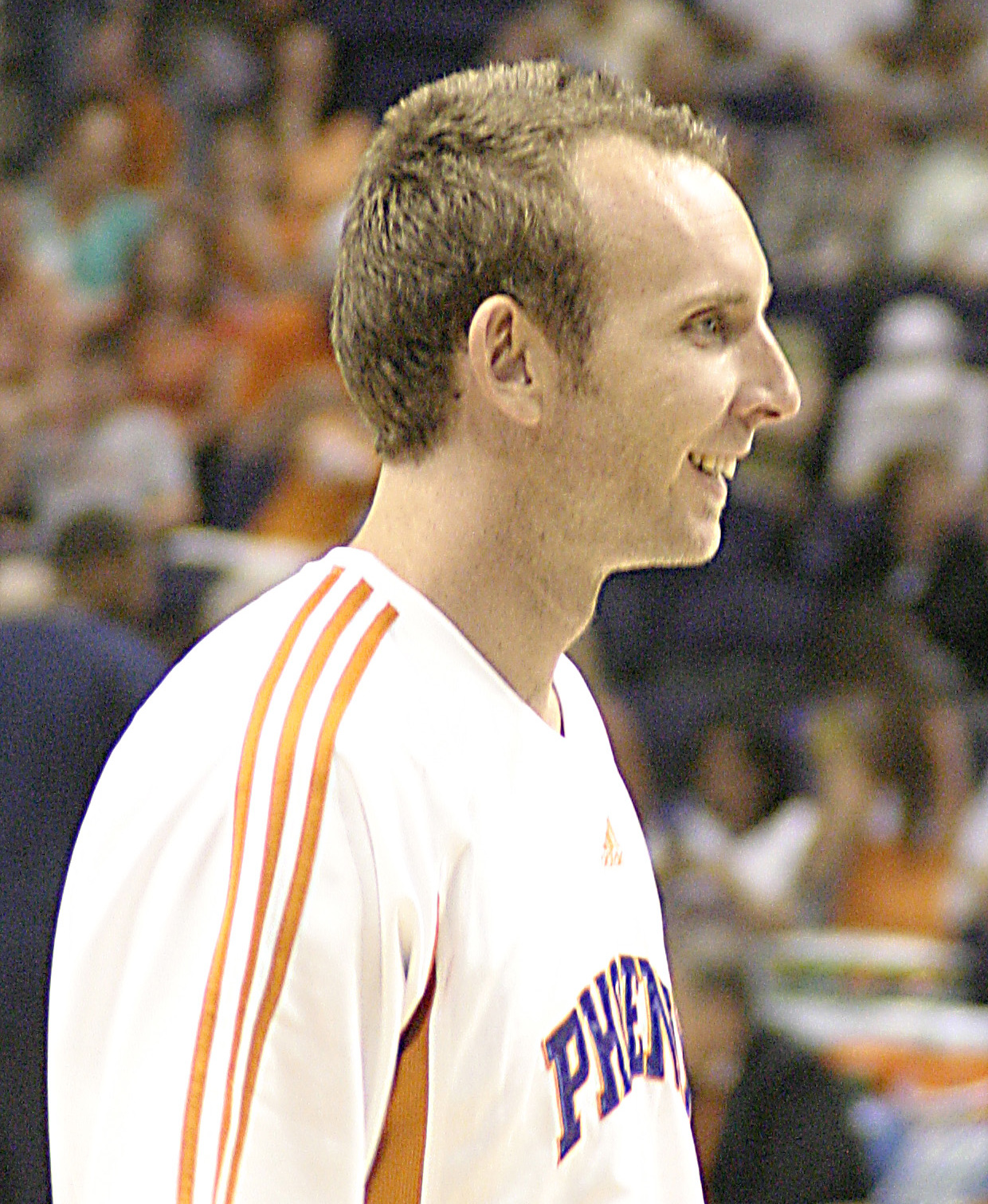
Marks with the Phoenix Suns in 2008

Marks later signed with the New Orleans Hornets on 28 August 2008. On 21 October 2010, Marks was waived by the Washington Wizards after he had failed to suit up for a pre-season game because of a hamstring injury. He was signed by Portland in November after the retirement of Fabricio Oberto.

On 24 February 2011, Marks was traded along with Joel Przybilla, Dante Cunningham and two future first-round draft picks to the Charlotte Bobcats for Gerald Wallace. The Bobcats waived Marks on March 3, 2011.

Internationally, Marks represented New Zealand. He competed in the 2000 and 2004 Olympic Games, and was part of their fourth-place finish at the 2002 FIBA World Championship held in Indianapolis, US.

== Coaching and executive career ==
Marks retired in 2011. In 2012, he was named basketball operations assistant for the San Antonio Spurs and general manager for the Austin Toros. He became an assistant coach with the Spurs in 2013. The Spurs went on to win the 2014 NBA Finals after defeating the Miami Heat in five games. It was Marks second championship and first as an assistant coach. At the start of the following season he returned to the front office, being named assistant general manager.

On 18 February 2016, it was announced that the Brooklyn Nets named Marks as the new general manager for the team, and penned a 4-year contract. Marks told then-owner Mikhail Prokhorov that his vision for rebuilding a team that had collapsed to only 21 wins involved a process that would take several years to execute, and made clear that he was not interested in a repeat of Prokhorov's previous "win now" approach. Earlier, Prokhorov had acknowledged his previous free-spending strategy was not the best way in the long run to build a champion. During the third year of Marks' contract, the Nets appeared in the 2019 NBA Playoffs, making it their first appearance since 2015.

On 19 May 2017, Marks was inducted into the Basketball New Zealand Hall of Fame.

On 21 April 2019, Marks was suspended for Game 5 of the Nets' contest against the Philadelphia 76ers, due to entering the referees’ locker room after the Nets' Game 4 loss. He was subsequently fined $25,000.

== NBA career statistics ==
Legend
GP	Games played	GS	Games started	MPG	Minutes per game
FG%	Field goal percentage	3P%	3-point field goal percentage	FT%	Free throw percentage
RPG	Rebounds per game	APG	Assists per game	SPG	Steals per game
BPG	Blocks per game	PPG	Points per game	**Bold**	Career high
†	Won an NBA championship

=== Regular season ===
Year	Team	GP	GS	MPG	FG%	3P%	FT%	RPG	APG	SPG	BPG	PPG
1998–99	Toronto	8	0	3.5	**.625**	.000	.500	.1	.0	.1	.0	1.4
1999–2000	Toronto	5	0	2.4	.333	.000	**1.000**	.4	.0	**.2**	.2	1.6
2001–02	Miami	21	**6**	**15.2**	.432	.000	.588	**3.6**	**.4**	**.2**	.5	**4.6**
2002–03	Miami	23	0	9.7	.373	.000	.667	1.5	.1	**.2**	.3	2.3
2004–05†	San Antonio	23	0	10.6	.338	.000	.786	2.4	.3	.1	.5	3.3
2005–06	San Antonio	25	0	7.2	.521	.000	.583	1.7	.3	**.2**	.3	3.2
2006–07	Phoenix	3	0	5.7	.333	.000	**1.000**	1.0	.0	.0	.3	2.0
2007–08	Phoenix	19	0	6.8	.535	.250	.632	1.9	.2	**.2**	.5	3.1
2008–09	New Orleans	**60**	5	14.0	.485	.200	.682	3.1	.2	.1	**.6**	3.2
2009–10	New Orleans	14	0	5.4	.500	.000	.400	1.6	.1	.0	.2	.7
2010–11	Portland	29	0	7.2	.432	**1.000**	.625	1.4	.1	.1	.2	1.6
Career		230	11	9.9	.448	.200	.665	2.2	.2	.1	.4	2.8

=== Playoffs ===
Year	Team	GP	GS	MPG	FG%	3P%	FT%	RPG	APG	SPG	BPG	PPG
2008	Phoenix	1	0	3.0	.000	.000	.000	.0	.0	.0	.0	.0
2009	New Orleans	**5**	0	**16.0**	**.462**	.000	**.800**	**4.0**	.0	**.6**	**.4**	**3.2**
Career		6	0	13.8	.462	.000	.800	3.3	.0	.5	.3	2.7

== Personal life ==
Marks and his wife Jennifer have four sons. The family resides in Greenwich, Connecticut.

Marks became an American citizen in 2007.

== See also ==
- List of National Basketball Association team presidents
