= Gordan Giriček =

Croatian basketball player (born 1977)

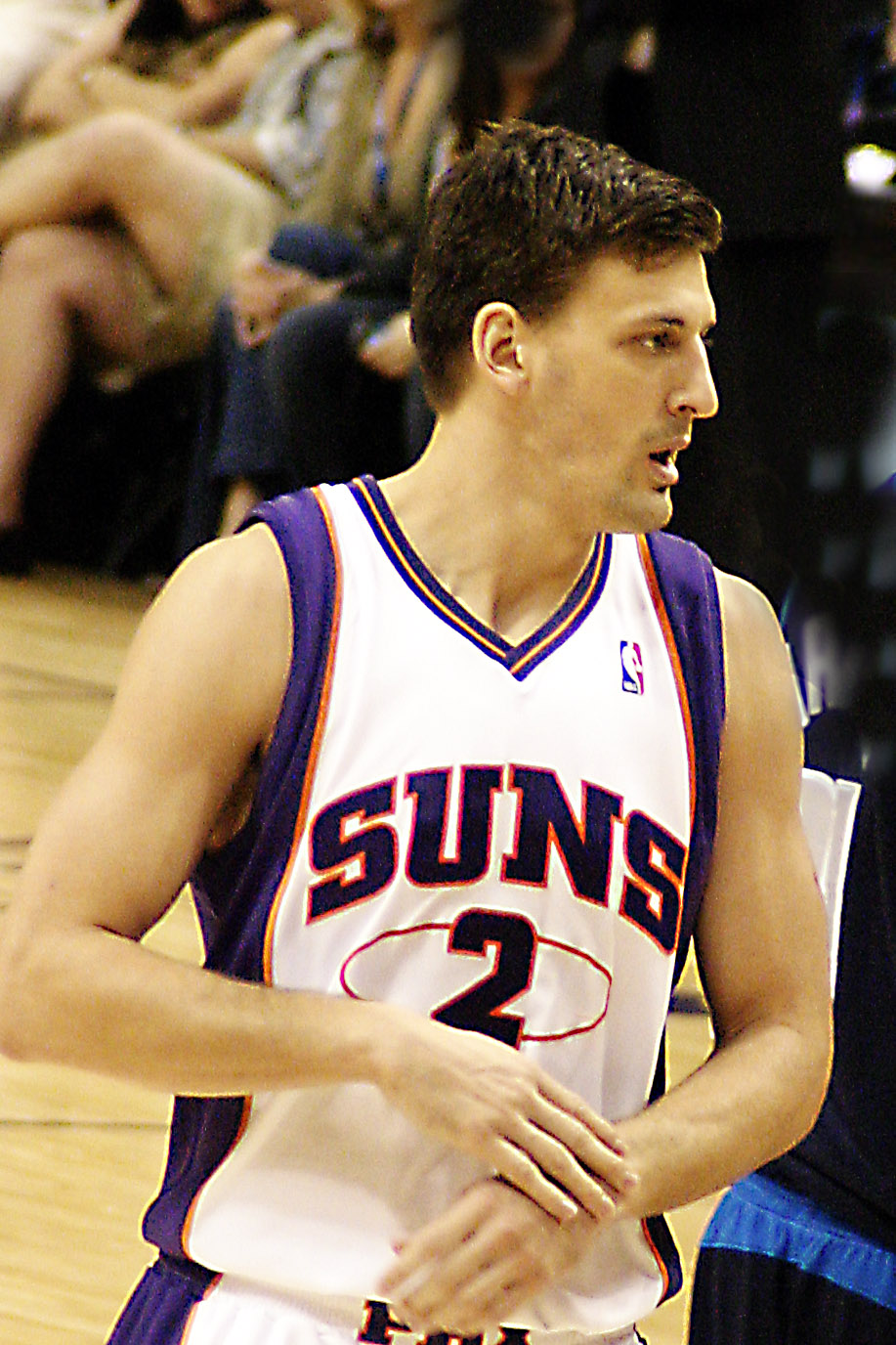
- Giriček with the Phoenix Suns in 2008

Personal information
- Born: June 20, 1977 (age 49) Zagreb, SR Croatia, SFR Yugoslavia
- Listed height: 6 ft 6 in (1.98 m)
- Listed weight: 225 lb (102 kg)

Career information
- NBA draft: 1999: 2nd round, 40th overall pick
- Drafted by: Dallas Mavericks
- Playing career: 1993–2011
- Position: Shooting guard / small forward
- Number: 6, 10, 7, 5, 11, 2

Career history
- 1993–2001: Cibona Zagreb
- 2001–2002: CSKA Moscow
- 2002–2003: Memphis Grizzlies
- 2003–2004: Orlando Magic
- 2004–2007: Utah Jazz
- 2007–2008: Philadelphia 76ers
- 2008: Phoenix Suns
- 2008–2010: Fenerbahçe
- 2010–2011: Cibona Zagreb

Career highlights
- 8× Croatian League champion (1994–2001); Turkish League champion (2010); 4× Croatian Cup winner (1995, 1996, 1999, 2001); Turkish Cup champion (2010); NBA All-Rookie Second Team (2003)
- Stats at NBA.com
- Stats at Basketball Reference
Medals
Men's basketball
Representing Croatia
FIBA Europe Under-18 Championship
Silver medal – second place	1994 Israel	U-18 Team

Gordan Giriček (born June 20, 1977) is a Croatian former professional basketball player. Standing at 6 ft 7 in (2.01 m), he played the shooting guard and small forward positions. Over eighteen years of professional basketball, he played in the NBA for several teams, including Memphis Grizzlies, Orlando Magic, Utah Jazz, Philadelphia 76ers, and the Phoenix Suns. He also played for several European teams, including Cibona, CSKA Moscow and Fenerbahçe.

== Professional career ==
=== Early years ===
Giriček started playing basketball with the youth section of a small local club in Zagreb called Jedinstvo.

Later on, he joined the Zagreb-based club Cibona, and while playing there he was selected by the Dallas Mavericks in the second round (40th pick overall) in the 1999 NBA draft and traded by the Mavericks to the San Antonio Spurs for Leon Smith. However, he never played for the Spurs, who traded his draft rights to the Memphis Grizzlies for a second-round pick in the 2004 NBA draft. He stayed in his native country Croatia until 2001.

In the summer of 2001, he signed a contract with the Russian team CSKA Moscow, playing the 2001–2002 season there. He had a breakthrough season, averaging 22.9 points, 3.1 rebounds and 1.6 assists over 18 games of the Euroleague.

=== Memphis Grizzlies (2002–2003) ===
He came to the United States in 2002. In his NBA debut game with the Memphis Grizzlies, he scored 29 points. Giriček's 29-point debut marked the highest-scoring debut by any NBA player since 1996, until it was surpassed by Philadelphia 76ers guard V. J. Edgecombe's 34 to start the 2025-26 season.

He played a total of 49 regular season games for the Memphis Grizzlies, averaging 11.2 points per game.

=== Orlando Magic (2003–2004) ===
On February 19, 2003, day before trade deadline, he was traded by Memphis, with Drew Gooden, to the Orlando Magic for Mike Miller, Ryan Humphrey, a future first-round draft pick and a future second-round draft pick. He ended that season on the NBA's All-Rookie second team.

=== Utah Jazz (2004–2007) ===
On February 19, 2004, Giricek was traded by the Orlando Magic to the Utah Jazz for DeShawn Stevenson and a future second-round draft pick. He scored a career-high 33 points against the Phoenix Suns on March 12, 2004.

With Utah, his main role was that of a shooting threat off the bench; he was also a part-time starter. While a competent defender, his best asset was his efficient three-point shooting. During the 2007 playoffs, he shot 53.8% from the three point line en route to an appearance in the Western Conference Finals. After their loss to the Spurs in five games, Deron Williams ripped the efforts of Giriček and Mehmet Okur.

Ronnie Brewer was named Utah's starting shooting guard after a strong performance in the 2007–08 preseason, relegating Giriček back to the bench. On December 19, Giriček was sent home from a game in Charlotte after a heated argument with coach Jerry Sloan. Though Giriček and Sloan indicated they moved on from the incident, Utah was reportedly intent on trading him, and the game in Charlotte would indeed be his last with the Jazz.

=== Philadelphia 76ers (2007–2008) ===
Giriček was traded from the Jazz to the Philadelphia 76ers on December 26, 2007, in exchange for Kyle Korver and a future first-round draft pick from the Jazz. He played as a Sixer against the Jazz five days later, and was booed in his return to Utah.

On February 29, 2008, he was waived by the 76ers, after appearing in 12 games with the team. He was waived in time to allow him to join a playoff team and qualify for their postseason roster.

=== Phoenix Suns (2008) ===
On March 4, 2008, the Phoenix Suns signed Giriček for the remainder of the season. He was involved in an altercation with Suns teammate Shaquille O'Neal, and was choked out.

=== Fenerbahçe (2008–2010) ===
In August 2008, 31-year-old Giriček left the NBA and returned to Europe. He signed a 2-year €4 million euros net income contract with the Turkish team Fenerbahçe. He was released on May 15, 2010.

=== Cibona Zagreb (2010–2011) ===
In December 2010, he signed a contract with Cibona Zagreb in his native country of Croatia until the end of the 2010–11 season. After this season, he retired from professional basketball.

== Croatian national basketball team ==
Giriček was a member of the Croatian national basketball team. With Croatia, he played at 5 consecutive European Championships: the 1997 European Championship, 1999 European Championship, 2001 European Championship, 2003 European Championship, and the 2005 European Championship.

== Personal life ==
In December 2003 Giriček married his long-time girlfriend Nataša Gulan, in Orlando, Florida. In February 2004 Nataša gave birth to their first and only child, a girl they named Lara.

In July 2004 Giriček signed a contract with the Jazz worth $16 million through 4 years. At that time, Giriček asked his wife to sign a postnuptial agreement. His lawyers drew up the agreement so that in case of a divorce, his wife would get the total salaries that she would have earned had she stayed at VIPnet, the mobile telephony company that she worked for before meeting Giriček. Gulan refused to sign the agreement and, in August 2004, Giriček decided to file for divorce after his wife had left him and moved to her mother's house with their child, with Gulan demanding $1.5 million.

In February 2007, a court in Croatia decided that Giriček's wife was to get $102,500. Giriček pays $1,500 per month in child support. During court trial his wife's lawyer wrote to Giriček's present and past clubs, requesting information about the player's earnings but, as such information was not demanded by Croatian courts, it was never disclosed by any of the teams. In July 2007, he decided not to join the Croatian national team for the 2007 European Championship because of dissidence with his ex-wife, as Gulan did not honour a child visitation agreement ordered by court, by which the player was to be with Lara during July, thus arriving on time for national team pre-tournament camp. Gulan argued that she got her holiday at that time and that it was unchangeable, also wanting to spend time with her daughter.

== Career statistics ==
Legend
GP	Games played	GS	Games started	MPG	Minutes per game
FG%	Field-goal percentage	3P%	3-point field-goal percentage	FT%	Free-throw percentage
RPG	Rebounds per game	APG	Assists per game	SPG	Steals per game
BPG	Blocks per game	PPG	Points per game	PIR	Performance index rating
**Bold**	Career high

=== NBA ===
==== Regular season ====
Year	Team	GP	GS	MPG	FG%	3P%	FT%	RPG	APG	SPG	BPG	PPG
2002–03	Memphis	49	35	24.2	.433	.354	.822	2.2	1.4	.4	.1	11.2
2002–03	Orlando	27	27	**35.6**	.440	.328	.816	**4.8**	**2.5**	**1.1**	.1	**14.3**
2003–04	Orlando	48	25	29.9	.440	.407	.827	3.4	1.7	.9	**.2**	10.2
2003–04	Utah	25	18	24.2	.431	.359	.883	2.5	1.7	.6	**.2**	13.5
2004–05	Utah	**81**	**44**	20.5	.448	.362	.810	2.2	1.7	.6	.1	8.8
2005–06	Utah	37	36	25.8	.433	.305	.754	1.9	1.7	.4	.1	10.6
2006–07	Utah	61	6	19.5	.462	**.426**	.816	2.1	1.0	.5	.1	7.8
2007–08	Utah	22	0	12.7	.402	.353	**1.000**	1.4	.7	.6	.0	4.3
2007–08	Philadelphia	12	0	9.2	.317	.333	.750	1.2	.9	.3	.1	3.1
2007–08	Phoenix	22	0	20.1	**.497**	.380	.941	2.3	1.6	.4	.1	8.8
Career		384	191	23.0	.442	.368	.823	2.5	1.5	.6	.1	9.6

==== Playoffs ====
Year	Team	GP	GS	MPG	FG%	3P%	FT%	RPG	APG	SPG	BPG	PPG
2003	Orlando	7	**7**	**31.9**	**.464**	.333	.818	**3.1**	**1.0**	.3	**.1**	**9.4**
2007	Utah	**17**	3	18.1	.418	**.538**	.875	1.6	**1.0**	.2	**.1**	6.1
2008	Phoenix	5	0	16.0	.333	.250	**1.000**	1.4	.4	**.4**	.0	3.4
Career		29	10	21.0	.424	.444	.871	2.0	.9	.2	.1	6.4

=== Euroleague ===
Year	Team	GP	GS	MPG	FG%	3P%	FT%	RPG	APG	SPG	BPG	PPG	PIR
2000–01	Cibona	6	4	27.0	.232	.129	.788	3.0	.8	.3	.0	10.3	2.7
2001–02	CSKA Moscow	**18**	**17**	**32.9**	**.528**	**.373**	.808	3.1	**1.6**	1.1	**.1**	**22.9**	**20.6**
2008–09	Fenerbahçe	5	3	28.1	.353	.250	**.842**	**3.2**	1.2	**1.6**	.0	11.4	9.8
2009–10	Fenerbahçe	10	3	21.2	.394	.367	.833	2.9	.8	.3	.0	8.2	4.5
Career		39	27	28.4	.446	.311	.810	3.1	1.2	.8	.0	15.7	12.3
