= 2007–08 Phoenix Suns season =

Professional basketball season

- Head coach: Mike D'Antoni
- President: Steve Kerr
- General manager: Steve Kerr
- Owner: Robert Sarver
- Arena: US Airways Center

Results
- Record: 55–27 (.671)
- Place: Division: 2nd (Pacific); Conference: 6th (Western)
- Playoff finish: First Round (lost to Spurs 1–4)
- Stats at Basketball Reference

Local media
- Television: FSN Arizona, KUTP
- Radio: KTAR

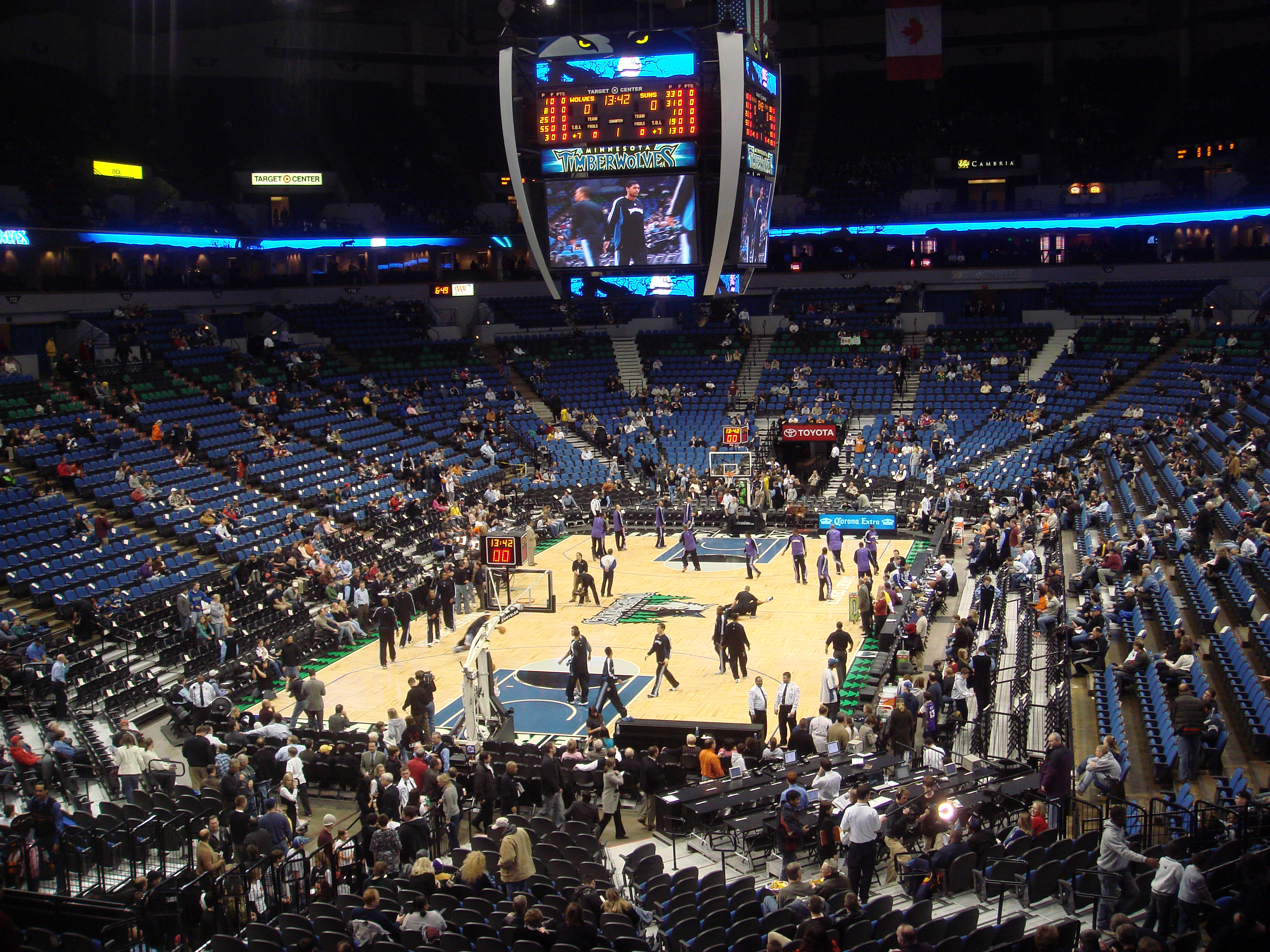
Players warming up prior to a January 2008 Suns road game versus the Minnesota Timberwolves.

The 2007–08 Phoenix Suns season was their 40th season in the National Basketball Association (NBA). The season was seen as the end of the "Seven Seconds or Less" era, after four-time All-Star Shawn Marion was traded midseason to the Miami Heat for big man Shaquille O'Neal. The Suns failed to advance past the first round of the playoffs for the first time since re-signing Steve Nash in 2004, losing to the defending NBA champion San Antonio Spurs in five games in the first round, which led to the departure of head coach Mike D'Antoni. The Suns had the second best team offensive rating in the NBA.

== Offseason ==
Forward Shawn Marion was set to earn $36 million over the next two seasons, putting the Suns over the salary cap next season and fueling speculations that he, one of the key Suns, may be traded during the offseason.

On June 6, former TNT analyst and NBA three-point specialist Steve Kerr was appointed Suns' General Manager and President of Basketball Operations. Kerr is close to team owner Robert Sarver and University of Arizona head men's basketball coach Lute Olson (Kerr's college coach); Kerr was also a part of the Sarver-led investment group that purchased the franchise from Jerry Colangelo.

On June 28, 2007, Spanish guard Rudy Fernández was taken 24th overall in the 2007 NBA Draft by the Suns, who subsequently traded the rights to the pick to the Portland Trail Blazers for cash. SF Alando Tucker of Wisconsin was taken with the 29th pick.

On July 5, 2007, the Suns came to an agreement with former Orlando Magic SF Grant Hill on a one-year $1.8 million deal with a player option for a second season at $2 million. In August 2007, Hill and his wife, R&B vocalist Tamia, purchased a home worth $3.78 million in the exclusive upscale community of Paradise Valley, adjacent to Scottsdale and home to several prominent local residents, including many star players for the Suns, Diamondbacks and the other local sports franchises.

On August 27, Maryland guard D. J. Strawberry (son of former Major League Baseball star Darryl Strawberry) signed a two-year contract with the Suns that included a guaranteed first year and a team option for the second season. Strawberry was drafted with the 59th selection in the second round of the 2007 NBA Draft; in the 2007 NBA Summer League he averaged a league-best 6.4 assists.

=== NBA draft ===
Round	Pick	Player	Position	Nationality	College / Club
1	24	Rudy Fernández	Guard	Spain	DVK Joventut Badalona
1	29	Alando Tucker	Forward	United States	Wisconsin
2	59	D. J. Strawberry	Guard	United States	Maryland

== Season ==
The Suns won at least 50 games for the fourth straight season and faced the defending champion San Antonio Spurs in the playoffs for the third time in four years. Even with the presence of Shaquille O'Neal who was traded to the team just before the All-Star break for Shawn Marion, the Suns were yet again eliminated, this time in five games. Just days after the loss Steve Kerr allowed Mike D'Antoni to pursue coaching positions elsewhere and he was subsequently signed as the head coach of the New York Knicks less than two weeks later.

== Roster ==
2007–08 Phoenix Suns roster
Players

Pos.	No.	Player	Height	Weight	DOB	From
G	10	Leandro Barbosa	6 ft 3 in (1.91 m)	202 lb (92 kg)	1982-11-28	Brazil
SG	19	Raja Bell	6 ft 5 in (1.96 m)	215 lb (98 kg)	1976-09-19	FIU
PF	3	Boris Diaw	6 ft 8 in (2.03 m)	235 lb (107 kg)	1982-04-16	France
G/F	2	Gordan Giriček	6 ft 6 in (1.98 m)	220 lb (100 kg)	1977-06-20	Croatia
SF	33	Grant Hill	6 ft 8 in (2.03 m)	225 lb (102 kg)	1972-10-05	Duke
F	43	Linton Johnson	6 ft 8 in (2.03 m)	205 lb (93 kg)	1980-06-13	Tulane
F/C	4	Sean Marks	6 ft 10 in (2.08 m)	250 lb (113 kg)	1975-08-23	California
PG	13	Steve Nash	6 ft 3 in (1.91 m)	178 lb (81 kg)	1974-02-07	Santa Clara
C	32	Shaquille O'Neal	7 ft 1 in (2.16 m)	325 lb (147 kg)	1972-03-16	LSU
G/F	52	Eric Piatkowski	6 ft 7 in (2.01 m)	215 lb (98 kg)	1970-09-30	Nebraska
F/C	54	Brian Skinner	6 ft 9 in (2.06 m)	255 lb (116 kg)	1976-05-19	Baylor
F/C	1	Amar'e Stoudemire	6 ft 10 in (2.08 m)	249 lb (113 kg)	1982-11-16	Cypress Creek HS (FL)
SG	8	D. J. Strawberry	6 ft 5 in (1.96 m)	201 lb (91 kg)	1985-06-15	Maryland
F	29	Alando Tucker	6 ft 6 in (1.98 m)	205 lb (93 kg)	1984-02-11	Wisconsin

Coaches
Head coach
- Mike D'Antoni
Assistant(s)
- Dan D'Antoni
- Alvin Gentry
- Jay Humphries
- Phil Weber

Legend
- (DP) Unsigned draft pick
- (FA) Free agent
- (S) Suspended
- Injured

Roster
Updated: April 16, 2008

== Regular season ==
=== Standings ===
Pacific Division	W	L	PCT	GB	Home	Road	Div
c-Los Angeles Lakers	57	25	.695	–	30–11	27–14	12–4
x-Phoenix Suns	55	27	.671	2	30–11	25–16	10–6
Golden State Warriors	48	34	.585	9	27–14	21–20	10–6
Sacramento Kings	38	44	.463	19	26–15	12–29	3–13
Los Angeles Clippers	23	59	.284	34	13–28	10–31	5–11

#	Western Conference				
#	Team	W	L	PCT	GB
1	c-Los Angeles Lakers	57	25	.695	–
2	y-New Orleans Hornets	56	26	.683	1
3	x-San Antonio Spurs	56	26	.683	1
4	y-Utah Jazz	54	28	.659	3
5	x-Houston Rockets	55	27	.671	2
6	x-Phoenix Suns	55	27	.671	2
7	x-Dallas Mavericks	51	31	.622	6
8	x-Denver Nuggets	50	32	.610	7
9	Golden State Warriors	48	34	.585	9
10	Portland Trail Blazers	41	41	.500	16
11	Sacramento Kings	38	44	.463	19
12	Los Angeles Clippers	23	59	.280	34
13	Minnesota Timberwolves	22	60	.268	35
14	Memphis Grizzlies	22	60	.268	35
15	Seattle SuperSonics	20	62	.244	37

== Game log ==
2007–08 game log
November: 12–4 (home: 6–2; road: 6–2)

Game	Date	Team	Score	High points	High rebounds	High assists	Location Attendance	Record
1	1 November 2007	@Sonics	106–99	Amar'e Stoudemire (23)	Amar'e Stoudemire and Shawn Marion (11)	Steve Nash (12)	17,072	1–0
2	2 November 2007	Lakers	119–98	Leandro Barbosa (23)			18,422	1–1
3	4 November 2007	Cavaliers	92–103	Steve Nash (30)			18,422	2–1
4	6 November 2007	@Bobcats	115–83	Three-way tie (16)			12,408	3–1
5	7 November 2007	@Hawks	96–105	Steve Nash (34)			19,855	3–2
6	9 November 2007	@Heat	106–101	Steve Nash (30)			19,600	4–2
7	10 November 2007	@Magic	106–96	Leandro Barbosa (39)			17,519	5–2
8	13 November 2007	Knicks	102–113	Amar'e Stoudemire (26)			18,422	6–2
9	15 November 2007	Bulls	102–112	Leandro Barbosa (25)			18,422	7–2
10	17 November 2007	@Rockets	115–105	Two-way tie (21)			18,265	8–2
11	20 November 2007	@Kings	100–98	Amar'e Stoudemire (26)			13,592	9–2
12	21 November 2007	@Kings	111–127	Shawn Marion (25)			18,422	10–2
13	23 November 2007	Clippers	94–113	Amar'e Stoudemire (29)			18,422	11–2
14	26 November 2007	@Warriors	114–129	Steve Nash (23)			19,596	11–3
15	28 November 2007	Rockets	100–94	Steve Nash (29)			18,422	11–4
16	30 November 2007	Magic	106–110	Raja Bell (20)			18,422	12–4

December: 10–5 (home: 3–1; road: 7–4)

Game	Date	Team	Score	High points	High rebounds	High assists	Location Attendance	Record
17	2 December 2007	@Knicks	115–104	Two-way tie (28)			18,869	13–4
18	4 December 2007	@Pacers	121–117	Amar'e Stoudemire (42)			11,435	14–4
19	5 December 2007	@Raptors	136–123	Leandro Barbosa (35)			19,800	15–4
20	7 December 2007	@Wizards	122–107	Amar'e Stoudemire (27)			20,173	16–4
21	8 December 2007	@Timberwolves	93–100	Shawn Marion (18)			19,356	16–5
22	10 December 2007	Heat	117–113	Four-way tie (19)			18,422	16–6
23	12 December 2007	Jazz	98–103	Steve Nash (29)			18,422	17–6
24	15 December 2007	@Hornets	98–101	Leandro Barbosa (19)			13,705	17–7
25	17 December 2007	@Spurs	100–95	Grant Hill (22)			18,797	18–7
26	19 December 2007	@Mavericks	105–108	Amar'e Stoudemire (25)			20,316	18–8
27	22 December 2007	Raptors	103–122	Leandro Barbosa (31)			18,422	19–8
28	25 December 2007	@Lakers	115–122	Steve Nash (24)			18,997	19–9
29	27 December 2007	@Clippers	108–88	Amar'e Stoudemire (30)			17,871	20–9
30	28 December 2007	Clippers	88–94	Amar'e Stoudemire (28)			18,422	21–9
31	30 December 2007	@Kings	117–102	Amar'e Stoudemire (31)			15,962	22–9

January: 16–8 (home: 11–5; road: 5–3)

Game	Date	Team	Score	High points	High rebounds	High assists	Location Attendance	Record
#	Date	Visitor	Score	Home	OT	Leading scorer	Attendance	Record
32	3 January 2008	SuperSonics	96–104	Suns	NA	Amar'e Stoudemire (34)	18,422	23–9
33	5 January 2008	Hornets	118–113	Suns	NA	Leandro Barbosa (28)	18,422	23–10
34	7 January 2008	Nuggets	115–137	Suns	NA	Shawn Marion (27)	18,422	24–10
35	9 January 2008	Pacers	122–129	Suns	1	Two-way tie (27)	18,422	25–10
36	10 January 2008	Suns	86–108	Jazz	NA	Leandro Barbosa (25)	19,911	25–11
37	12 January 2008	Bucks	114–122	Suns	NA	Steve Nash (35)	18,422	26–11
38	15 January 2008	Suns	90–97	Clippers	NA	Amar'e Stoudemire (29)	16,063	26–12
39	17 January 2008	Suns	106–98	Lakers	NA	Leandro Barbosa (22)	18,997	27–12
40	18 January 2008	Timberwolves	95–115	Suns	NA	Amar'e Stoudemire (23)	18,422	28–12
41	20 January 2008	Nets	92–116	Suns	NA	Amar'e Stoudemire (28)	18,422	29–12
42	22 January 2008	Suns	114–105	Bucks	NA	Steve Nash (37)	14,503	30–12
43	23 January 2008	Suns	107–117	Timberwolves	NA	Amar'e Stoudemire (33)	15,101	30–13
44	25 January 2008	Suns	110–108	Cavaliers	NA	Raja Bell (27)	20,562	31–13
45	27 January 2008	Suns	88–77	Bulls	NA	Amar'e Stoudemire (24)	22,245	32–13
46	29 January 2008	Hawks	92–125	Suns	NA	Amar'e Stoudemire (24)	18,422	33–13
47	31 January 2008	Spurs	84–81	Suns	NA	Shawn Marion (21)	18,422	33–14

February: 6–4 (home: 5–3; road: 1–1)

Game	Date	Team	Score	High points	High rebounds	High assists	Location Attendance	Record
#	Date	Visitor	Score	Home	OT	Leading scorer	Attendance	Record
48	4 February 2008	Bobcats	104–118	Suns	NA	Leandro Barbosa (30)	18,422	34–14
49	6 February 2008	Hornets	132–130	Suns	2	Steve Nash (32)	18,422	34–15
50	8 February 2008	SuperSonics	99–103	Suns	NA	Amar'e Stoudemire (33)	18,422	35–15
51	10 February 2008	Wizards	107–108	Suns	NA	Amar'e Stoudemire (31)	18,422	36–15
52	13 February 2008	Suns	118–120	Warriors	NA	Amar'e Stoudemire (29)	19,754	36–16
53	14 February 2008	Mavericks	97–109	Suns	NA	Two-way tie (26)	18,422	37–16
54	20 February 2008	Lakers	130–124	Suns	NA	Amar'e Stoudemire (37)	18,422	37–17
55	22 February 2008	Celtics	77–85	Suns	NA	Amar'e Stoudemire (28)	18,422	38–17
56	24 February 2008	Pistons	116–86	Suns	NA	Amar'e Stoudemire (31)	18,422	38–18
57	26 February 2008	Suns	127–113	Grizzlies	NA	Two-way tie (25)	13,482	39–18
58	27 February 2008	Suns	103–120	Hornets	NA	Amar'e Stoudemire (32)	17,931	39–19

March: 11–5 (home: 6–2; road: 5–3)

Game	Date	Team	Score	High points	High rebounds	High assists	Location Attendance	Record
#	Date	Visitor	Score	Home	OT	Leading scorer	Attendance	Record
59	1 March 2008	Sixers	119–114	Suns	NA	Amar'e Stoudemire (26)	18,422	39–20
60	4 March 2008	Suns	97–92	Trail Blazers	NA	Amar'e Stoudemire (22)	20,595	40–20
61	5 March 2008	Suns	113–126	Nuggets	NA	Amar'e Stoudemire (22)	18,383	40–21
62	7 March 2008	Jazz	126–118	Suns	NA	Amar'e Stoudemire (37)	18,422	40–22
63	9 March 2008	Spurs	87–94	Suns	NA	Steve Nash (19)	18,422	41–22
64	12 March 2008	Grizzlies	111–132	Suns	NA	Amar'e Stoudemire (29)	18,422	42–22
65	13 March 2008	Warriors	115–123	Suns	NA	Amar'e Stoudemire (36)	18,422	43–22
66	15 March 2008	Kings	99–127	Suns	NA	Amar'e Stoudemire (30)	18,422	44–22
67	18 March 2008	Suns	111–98	Trail Blazers	NA	Amar'e Stoudemire (25)	20,580	45–22
68	19 March 2008	Suns	110–98	Sonics	NA	Amar'e Stoudemire (26)	17,072	46–22
69	22 March 2008	Rockets	113–122	Suns	NA	Amar'e Stoudemire (38)	18,422	47–22
70	24 March 2008	Suns	105–110	Pistons	1	Amar'e Stoudemire (33)	22,076	47–23
71	26 March 2008	Suns	97–117	Celtics	NA	Amar'e Stoudemire (32)	18,624	47–24
72	28 March 2008	Suns	107–93	Sixers	NA	Amar'e Stoudemire (22)	20,707	48–24
73	29 March 2008	Suns	110–104	Nets	NA	Amar'e Stoudemire (33)	19,990	49–24
74	31 March 2008	Nuggets	117–132	Suns	NA	Amar'e Stoudemire (41)	18,422	50–24

April: 5–3 (home: 3–1; road: 2–2)

Game	Date	Team	Score	High points	High rebounds	High assists	Location Attendance	Record
75	1 April 2008	@Nuggets	120–126	Leandro Barbosa (27)			18,870	50–25
76	4 April 2008	Timberwolves	88–117	Amar'e Stoudemire (24)			18,422	51–25
77	6 April 2008	Mavericks	105–98	Amar'e Stoudemire (31)			18,422	51–26
78	8 April 2008	@Grizzlies	127–113	Amar'e Stoudemire (28)			13,987	52–26
79	9 April 2008	@Spurs	96–79	Amar'e Stoudemire (21)			18,797	53–26
80	11 April 2008	@Rockets	90–101	Amar'e Stoudemire (37)			18,489	53–27
81	14 April 2008	Warriors	116–122	Amar'e Stoudemire (28)			18,422	54–27
82	16 April 2008	Trail Blazers	91–100	Gordon Giricek (17)			18,422	55–27

== Playoffs ==
2008 playoff game log
First Round: 1–4 (home: 1–1; road: 0–3)

Game	Date	Team	Score	High points	High rebounds	High assists	Location Attendance	Series
1	April 19	@ San Antonio	L 115–117 (2OT)	Amar'e Stoudemire (33)	Leandro Barbosa (8)	Steve Nash (13)	AT&T Center; 18,797	0–1
2	April 22	@ San Antonio	L 96–102	Amar'e Stoudemire (33)	Shaquille O'Neal (14)	Steve Nash (10)	AT&T Center; 18,797	0–2
3	April 25	San Antonio	L 99–115	Amar'e Stoudemire (28)	Amar'e Stoudemire (11)	Steve Nash (9)	US Airways Center; 18,422	0–3
4	April 27	San Antonio	W 105–86	Raja Bell (27)	Shaquille O'Neal (12)	Boris Diaw (8)	US Airways Center; 18,422	1–3
5	April 29	@ San Antonio	L 87–92	Boris Diaw (22)	Amar'e Stoudemire (11)	Boris Diaw (8)	AT&T Center; 18,797	1–4

2008 playoff schedule

== Player statistics ==
Legend
GP	Games played	GS	Games started	MPG	Minutes per game
FG%	Field-goal percentage	3P%	3-point field-goal percentage	FT%	Free-throw percentage
RPG	Rebounds per game	APG	Assists per game	SPG	Steals per game
BPG	Blocks per game	PPG	Points per game

=== Season ===
Player	GP	GS	MPG	FG%	3P%	FT%	RPG	APG	SPG	BPG	PPG
Marcus Banks*	24	1	12.9	.404	.385	.750	0.8	1.0	.3	.3	5.2
Leandro Barbosa	82	12	29.5	.462	.389	.822	2.8	2.6	.9	.2	15.6
Raja Bell	75	75	35.3+	.421	.401	.868	3.7	2.2	.7	.4	11.9
Boris Diaw	82	19	28.1	.477	.317	.744	4.6	3.9	.7	.5	8.8
Gordan Giriček*	22	0	20.1	.497	.380	.941#	2.3	1.6	.4	.1	8.8
Grant Hill	70	68	31.7	.503	.317	.867	5.0	2.9	.9+	.8	13.1
Linton Johnson*	6	0	8.8	.500	.500^	.	2.2	0.5	.0	.2	2.5
Shawn Marion*	47	47	36.4+	.526	.347	.713	9.9+	2.1	2.0+	1.5	15.8
Sean Marks	19	0	6.8	.535	.250	.632	1.9	0.2	.2	.5	3.1
Steve Nash	81	81	34.3	.504	.470^	.906#	3.5	11.1	.7	.1	16.9
Shaquille O'Neal*	28	28	28.7	.611†	.	.513	10.6+	1.7	.5	1.2	12.9
Eric Piatkowski	16	0	7.1	.364	.423	1.000#	0.8	0.6	.0	.1	2.4
Brian Skinner	66	0	12.8	.465	.667^	.524	3.6	0.2	.3	1.2	3.3
Amar'e Stoudemire	79	79	33.9	.590†	.161	.805	9.1	1.5	.8	2.1	25.2
D. J. Strawberry	33	0	8.2	.315	.240	.474	0.8	0.9	.4	.2	2.2
Alando Tucker	6	0	8.0	.364	.250	.833	1.3	0.0	.0	.2	3.7

* – Stats with the Suns.

+ – Minimum 70 games played or 2000 minutes, 800 rebounds, 125 steals.

† – Minimum 300 field goals made.

^ – Minimum 55 three-pointers made.

# – Minimum 125 free throws made.

=== Playoffs ===
Player	GP	GS	MPG	FG%	3P%	FT%	RPG	APG	SPG	BPG	PPG
Leandro Barbosa	5	1	28.6	.345	.222	.909	4.0	1.8	.6	.0	10.4
Raja Bell	5	5	43.0	.568	.650	.813	5.6	2.2	.4	.2	13.6
Boris Diaw	5	2	35.6	.547	.000	.500	5.6	4.6	.6	.8	14.6
Gordan Giriček	5	0	16.0	.333	.250	1.000#	1.4	0.4	.4	.0	3.4
Grant Hill	3	2	22.7	.455	.	1.000#	5.3	1.0	.7	.3	3.7
Sean Marks	1	0	3.0	.	.	.	0.0	0.0	.0	.0	0.0
Steve Nash	5	5	36.6	.457	.300	.917#	2.8	7.8	.4	.2	16.2
Shaquille O'Neal	5	5	30.0	.440	.	.500	9.2	1.0	1.0	2.6	15.2
Eric Piatkowski	1	0	2.0	.	.	.	0.0	0.0	.0	.0	0.0
Brian Skinner	4	0	5.3	.500	.	.500	0.8	0.0	.0	.8	2.0
Amar'e Stoudemire	5	5	40.8	.485	.250	.633	9.0	0.4	1.4	2.4	23.2
D. J. Strawberry	1	0	5.0	.000	.000	.	1.0	0.0	.0	.0	0.0

# – Minimum 10 free throws made.

== Transactions ==
The Suns were involved in the following transactions during the 2007–08 season.

=== Trades ===
July 11, 2007	To Phoenix Suns Cash considerations	To Portland Trail Blazers James Jones Draft rights to Rudy Fernández
July 20, 2007	To Phoenix Suns Second round draft pick (2008)	To Seattle SuperSonics Kurt Thomas 2008 first round pick 2010 first round pick
February 6, 2008	To Phoenix Suns Shaquille O'Neal	To Miami Heat Shawn Marion Marcus Banks

=== Free agents ===
Player	Former team
Grant Hill	Orlando Magic
Gordan Giricek	Philadelphia 76ers

Player	New team
Pat Burke	Golden State Warriors (was released and sent to Khimki BC)

== See also ==
- 2007–08 NBA season
