= Coby Karl =

American basketball player and coach (born 1983)

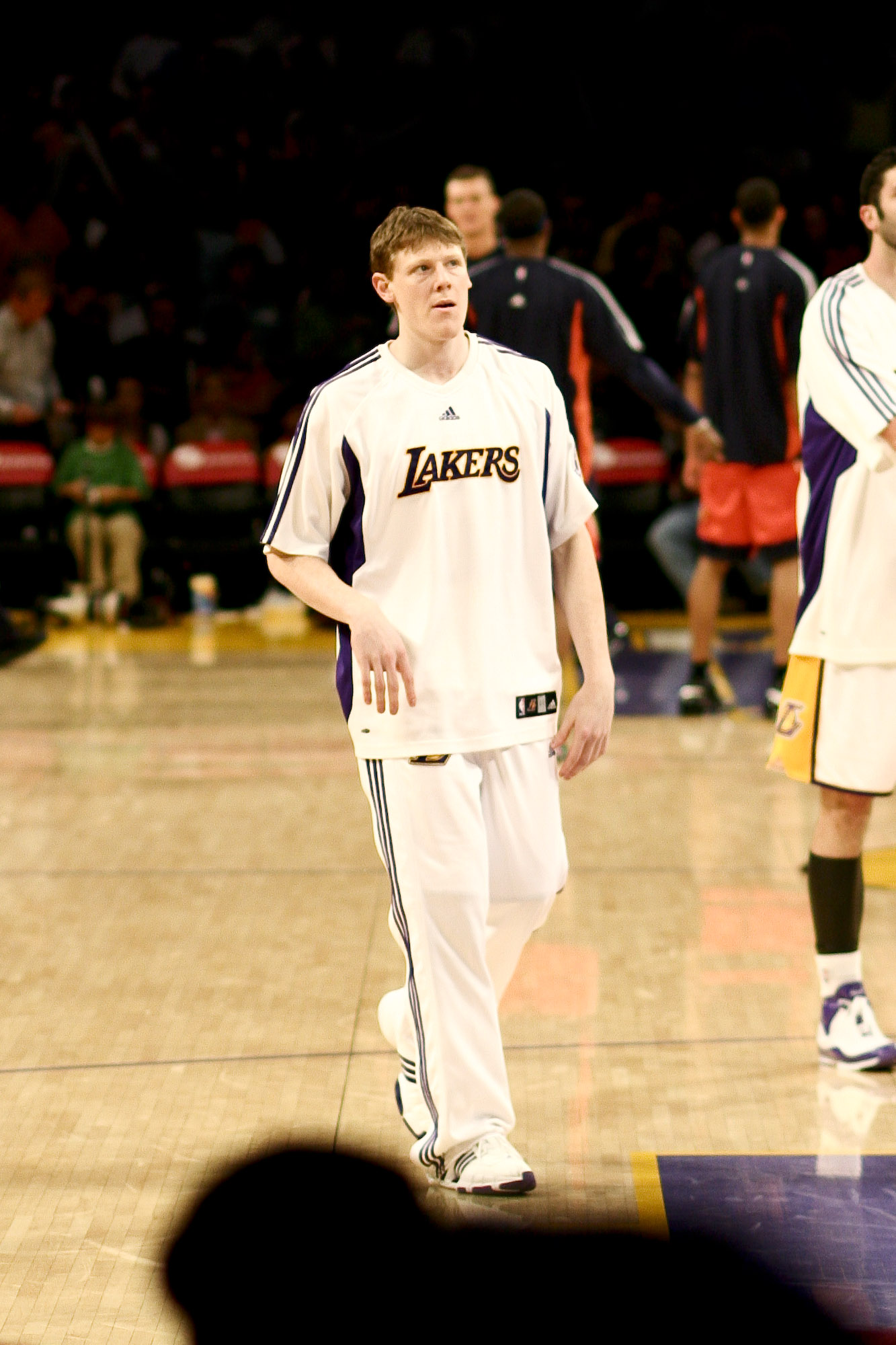
- Karl with the Los Angeles Lakers in 2008

Boise State Broncos
- Title: Assistant to the Head Coach
- League: Mountain West Conference

Personal information
- Born: June 8, 1983 (age 43) Great Falls, Montana, U.S.
- Listed height: 6 ft 5 in (1.96 m)
- Listed weight: 215 lb (98 kg)

Career information
- High school: Homestead (Mequon, Wisconsin)
- College: Boise State (2003–2007)
- NBA draft: 2007: undrafted
- Playing career: 2007–2015
- Position: Shooting guard
- Number: 11, 5
- Coaching career: 2015–present

Career history

Playing
- 2007–2008: Los Angeles Lakers
- 2007–2008: Los Angeles D-Fenders
- 2008–2009: Idaho Stampede
- 2009: Joventut Badalona
- 2009–2010: Cleveland Cavaliers
- 2010: Idaho Stampede
- 2010: Golden State Warriors
- 2010: Idaho Stampede
- 2010–2011: Granada
- 2011: Olimpia Milano
- 2011–2012: Sutor Montegranaro
- 2012–2013: Idaho Stampede
- 2013: Reggiana
- 2013–2015: Lugwigsburg
- 2015: Reno Bighorns

Coaching
- 2015–2016: Westchester Knicks (assistant)
- 2016–2021: Los Angeles D-Fenders / South Bay Lakers
- 2021–2023: Delaware Blue Coats
- 2023–2025: Philadelphia 76ers (assistant)
- 2025–present: Boise State men's basketball (assistant to head coach)

Career highlights
- As player: First-team All-WAC (2007); As head coach: NBA G League champion (2023)
- Stats at NBA.com
- Stats at Basketball Reference

Coby Joseph Karl (born June 8, 1983) is an American former professional basketball player who is assistant to the head coach at Boise State men's basketball team. He is the son of NBA head coach George Karl.

== High school career ==
Karl attended Homestead High School in Mequon, Wisconsin, and lettered in basketball. He was an All-Suburban selection, a first team All-Conference selection, and an All-State Honorable Mention selection as a senior. Karl graduated in 2002.

== College career ==
Karl played basketball at Boise State while majoring in Mass Communications. The 6 ft 5 in (1.96 m) shooting guard led the Broncos in points (17.2) and assists (4.0) as a junior, and he averaged 14.8 points and 4.0 assists during his senior season en route to First Team All-WAC honors in 2007.

Karl had weighed whether to return to college for his senior year or to enter the 2006 NBA draft, attending a few pre-draft workouts for various professional teams. However, he decided to return to college.

== Professional career ==
Karl was not drafted by an NBA team, but made the Lakers' 15-man roster as a free agent. Karl made his NBA debut on October 30, 2007, with the Lakers versus the Houston Rockets, playing 37 seconds and registering no statistics. He was assigned to the Los Angeles D-Fenders of the NBA Development League.

On February 19, 2008, Karl joined Lakers' second-year guard Jordan Farmar as the only other player in league history to see action in same-day D-League and NBA games.

Karl was then recalled from the Los Angeles D-Fenders for the third time that season, which is the most any player can be recalled in one season.

In April 2008, the Los Angeles Lakers played the Denver Nuggets in the first round of the 2008 NBA Playoffs, Karl and his father became the first father and son to ever oppose each other in the NBA playoffs. Karl was a reserve for the Lakers, and his father was the head coach for the Nuggets. Karl was released by Los Angeles on October 27, 2008.

Karl joined the Spanish pro club Joventut Badalona of the Liga ACB in January 2009.

In September 2009, Karl reached an agreement to attend training camp with the Cleveland Cavaliers, where he competed for a regular-season roster spot. On October 22, 2009, the Cavaliers made three final cuts, ensuring Karl a spot on their opening day roster. The Cavaliers waived Karl on January 6, 2010, sending him to free agency.

On January 30, 2010, Karl was signed to a 10-day contract by the Golden State Warriors. After his stint with the Warriors, he returned to the NBA D-League as a member of the Idaho Stampede.

On April 11, 2010, Karl was signed to the Nuggets to an undisclosed contract. He was waived by the Nuggets on August 16, 2010.

In September 2010, he returned to play in Spain, signing a one-year contract with CB Granada.

In May 2011, after being relegated to the second division in Spain with CB Granada, he signed with Armani Jeans Milano in Italy until the end of the season.

In September 2011, he signed with Fabi Shoes Montegranaro in Lega Basket Serie A in Italy.

In October 2012, Karl rejoined the Idaho Stampede.

On July 30, 2013, Karl signed with Pallacanestro Reggiana of Italy. He left them in December 2013. He then signed with MHP Riesen Ludwigsburg. On March 12, he left Riesen Ludwigsburg with the intent of going to the D-League. On March 17, 2015, he signed with Reno and made his debut. On August 21, 2015, Karl retired.

== Coaching career ==
On October 27, 2015, Karl was hired as an assistant coach by the Westchester Knicks, the NBA Development League affiliate of the New York Knicks. Westchester made significant improvement during the one season Karl spent on the bench, upping its record from 10–40 in 2014–15 to a 28–22 mark during the 2015–16 campaign.

On September 12, 2016, Karl took over his first head coaching role with the NBA D-League's Los Angeles D-Fenders, the affiliate team of the Lakers. He was not retained by the organization prior to the 2021–22 season.

On September 28, 2021, Karl became the new head coach of the Delaware Blue Coats. On April 7, 2023, he won the NBA G League title with the Blue Coats.

On September 5, 2023, Karl became an assistant coach for the Philadelphia 76ers. On May 15, 2025, Karl and the 76ers parted ways.

On September 25, 2025, Karl became assistant to the head coach for the Boise State men's basketball team.

== Thyroid cancer ==
Karl also underwent radioactive iodine treatment, a painless and simple outpatient treatment, for papillary carcinoma, a thyroid cancer considered by doctors to be one of the most treatable forms of cancer. After his senior year, Karl again had another surgery to remove cancerous cells. His father left the Nuggets to be with his son during the seven-hour surgery and returned to the team after the completion of the surgery.

== NBA career statistics ==
Legend
GP	Games played	GS	Games started	MPG	Minutes per game
FG%	Field goal percentage	3P%	3-point field goal percentage	FT%	Free throw percentage
RPG	Rebounds per game	APG	Assists per game	SPG	Steals per game
BPG	Blocks per game	PPG	Points per game	**Bold**	Career high

=== Regular season ===
Year	Team	GP	GS	MPG	FG%	3P%	FT%	RPG	APG	SPG	BPG	PPG
2007–08	L.A. Lakers	**17**	0	4.2	**.346**	**.308**	**.800**	.8	.5	.2	.1	1.8
2009–10	Cleveland	3	0	1.7	–	–	–	.7	.0	.0	.0	.0
2009–10	Golden State	4	**1**	**27.0**	.344	.182	.667	**4.0**	**3.8**	**.8**	**.3**	**7.0**
Career		24	1	7.6	.345	.250	.750	1.3	1.0	.3	.1	2.4

=== Playoffs ===
Year	Team	GP	GS	MPG	FG%	3P%	FT%	RPG	APG	SPG	BPG	PPG
2008	L.A. Lakers	1	0	2.0	.000	.000	.000	.0	1.0	.0	.0	.0
