= Ronny Turiaf =

French basketball player (born 1983)

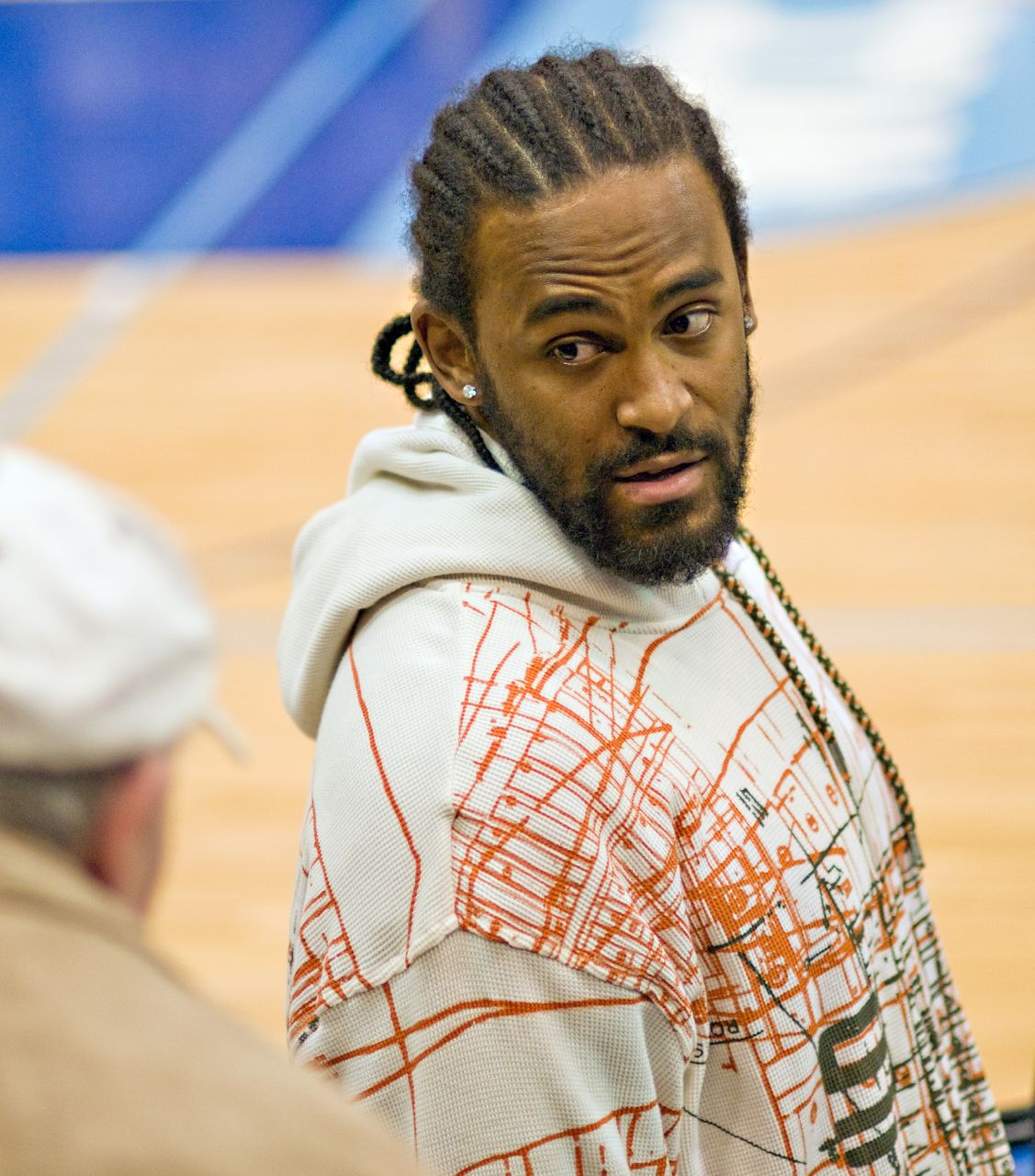
- Turiaf in 2008

Personal information
- Born: 13 January 1983 (age 43) Le Robert, Martinique
- Listed height: 6 ft 10 in (2.08 m)
- Listed weight: 249 lb (113 kg)

Career information
- High school: INSEP, Emlyon Business School
- College: Gonzaga (2001–2005)
- NBA draft: 2005: 2nd round, 37th overall pick
- Drafted by: Los Angeles Lakers
- Playing career: 2005–2014
- Position: Center
- Number: 21, 14, 32

Career history
- 2005–2006: Yakima SunKings
- 2006–2008: Los Angeles Lakers
- 2008–2010: Golden State Warriors
- 2010–2011: New York Knicks
- 2011: ASVEL
- 2011–2012: Washington Wizards
- 2012: Miami Heat
- 2012–2013: Los Angeles Clippers
- 2013–2014: Minnesota Timberwolves

Career highlights
- NBA champion (2012); French Basketball Hall of Fame (2020); WCC Player of the Year (2005); 3× First-team All-WCC (2003–2005)
- Stats at NBA.com
- Stats at Basketball Reference
Medals
Men's basketball
Representing France
FIBA Europe Under-18 Championship
Gold medal – first place	2000 Croatia	U-18 Team
FIBA Europe Under-20 Championship
Bronze medal – third place	2002 Lithuania	U-20 Team

Ronny Turiaf (/ˈroʊni ˈtɜːriɑːf/ ROH-nee TUR-ee-ahf, French: [ʁɔni tyʁijaf]; born 13 January 1983) is a French former professional basketball player who played 10 seasons in the National Basketball Association (NBA). Turiaf grew up in France and played college basketball for the Gonzaga Bulldogs in the United States, where he led the West Coast Conference (WCC) in scoring in his senior year. After graduating from Gonzaga, he entered the 2005 NBA draft and was picked by the Los Angeles Lakers. He later played for the Golden State Warriors, New York Knicks, Washington Wizards, Miami Heat, Los Angeles Clippers and Minnesota Timberwolves. Turiaf won an NBA championship with Miami in 2012. He was also a member of the French national team. He was inducted into the French Basketball Hall of Fame in 2020.

== Early life ==
Born in Fort-de-France, Turiaf spent most of his childhood in Martinique, a French overseas departments in the Caribbean Sea. Following the advice from his father, Turiaf moved to Paris in 1998, at the age of 15, to attend the National Institute of Physical Education (INSEP), a school that combines rigorous secondary education with elite-level athletic training.

In 1999, he made the French Under-18 national team, and he helped lead the team to the gold medal at the 2000 FIBA Europe Under-18 Championship with future NBA stars Tony Parker, Boris Diaw, and Mickaël Piétrus.

== College career ==
In 2001, Turiaf departed France after accepting an offer to attend Gonzaga University in Spokane, Washington, where he played for four years. In his last three years at Gonzaga, he was named First Team All-WCC. Additionally, in his senior year (2004–05), he was named the conference's Player of the Year. He ended his college career as the fourth all-time leader in scoring and rebounding in school history, with 1,723 points and 859 rebounds, respectively. He averaged 13.6 points and 6.8 rebounds per game through his college years at Gonzaga, but led the WCC averaging 15.9 points, 9.5 rebounds, and 1.9 blocks per game as a senior. He graduated from Gonzaga with a degree in sports management, communication and French. He was the first triple major in his family.

== Professional career ==
=== Los Angeles Lakers ===
==== 2005–06 season ====
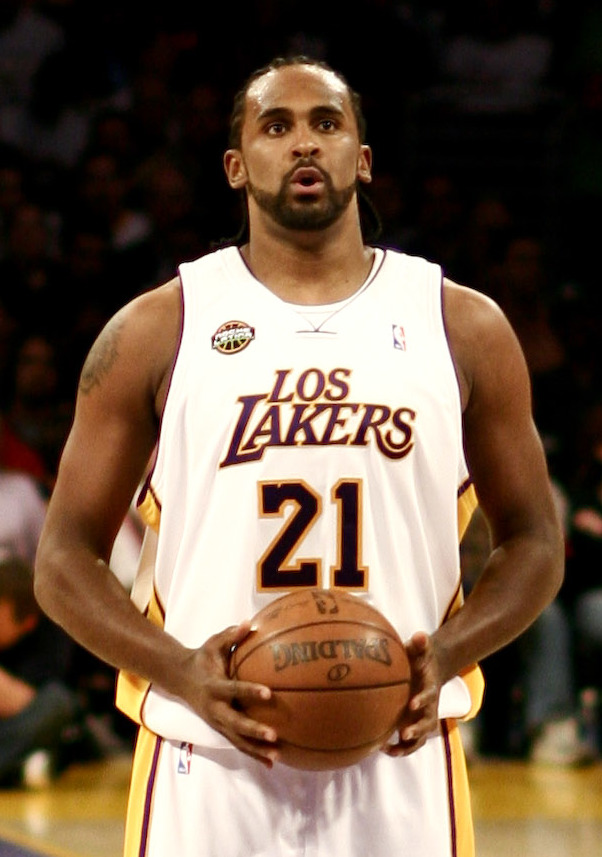
Turiaf in the Los Angeles Lakers uniform. He played for Lakers from 2006 to 2008.

Ronny Turiaf was the 37th overall pick in the 2005 NBA draft to the Los Angeles Lakers, signing a two-year, $1 million contract. After a physical exam conducted by the Lakers just four weeks after the draft, team doctor, John Moe, found an enlarged aortic root in Turiaf's heart. After multiple examinations by other physicians, the Lakers decided that the problem, which was cleared by doctors in both France and the NBA's pre-Draft camp, was serious enough to require surgery. The Lakers were forced to void Turiaf's contract but retained his rights in case he was cleared to play again after the surgery. In addition, the team paid for all the expenses from the surgery. Turiaf underwent the six-hour open-heart surgery on 26 July 2005. His expected recovery time was between six and twelve months.

As part of his rehabilitation, Turiaf signed with the Continental Basketball Association's Yakama Sun Kings, a team that drafted him with their 36th pick in the 2005 CBA draft. He played nine games with the Sun Kings, averaging 13 points and 6.3 rebounds per game. Turiaf recovered from his surgery quicker than expected and was therefore re-signed with the Lakers on 17 January 2006, less than six months after his surgery. In order to make room on the team's 15-man roster, the Lakers waived guard Laron Profit after his season-ending injury.

==== 2006–07 season ====
On 1 November 2006, in the second game of the season, Ronny Turiaf scored career highs in almost every category against the Golden State Warriors, including 8/10 shooting with 23 points and 14 rebounds.

==== 2007–08 season ====
Turiaf received playing time due to the many Laker injuries during the 2007–08 season. He was in the starting line-up at the beginning of the season as a forward alongside Lamar Odom, but after spraining his left ankle during practice on 15 November 2007, Turiaf missed two games of his own while his starts became limited. However, after Pau Gasol sprained his ankle on 14 March 2008 in New Orleans, Ronny took over as the starting center for nine games until Gasol returned on April 2. In that nine game span, Turiaf's stats jumped to over 30 minutes per game with 11 points, 6 rebounds, and 2 blocks. Yet the Lakers went 5–4 during those nine games, including back-to-back losses at home against the Charlotte Bobcats and the Memphis Grizzlies, two of the league's worst teams. Turiaf and the Lakers would reach the 2008 NBA Finals, but they would lose in six games to their arch rivals Boston Celtics.

During his time with the Lakers, Turiaf developed a close friendship with teammate Kobe Bryant. Bryant expressed sadness upon Turiaf's departure from the Lakers and would later say that Turiaf was one of his four all-time favorite teammates.

=== Golden State Warriors ===
On 9 July 2008, Ronny Turiaf agreed to a four-year, $17 million contract offer from the Golden State Warriors. According to free agency rules, his previous team, the Los Angeles Lakers, had seven days to match that offer.

The Lakers, on July 18, decided not to match the Warriors' offer and the deal was finalized.

=== New York Knicks ===
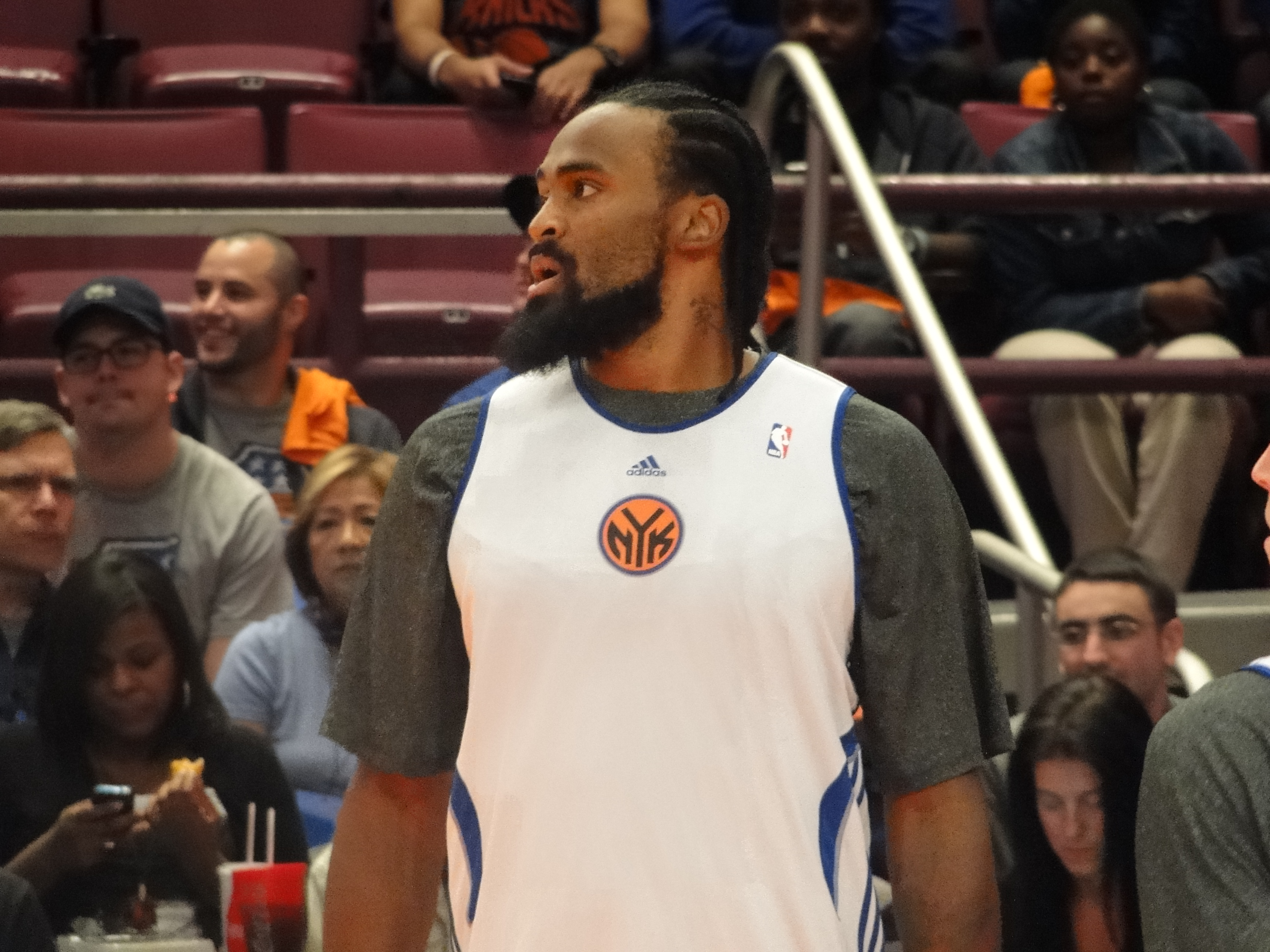
Turiaf with the New York Knicks in 2010

On 9 July 2010 Turiaf was traded to the New York Knicks along with Anthony Randolph, Kelenna Azubuike and a future second-round pick in a sign and trade deal for David Lee.

=== ASVEL Lyon-Villeurbanne ===
During the 2011 NBA lockout he signed with ASVEL Lyon-Villeurbanne in his native France.

=== Washington Wizards ===
On 10 December 2011, Turiaf was traded to the Washington Wizards.

=== Miami Heat ===
On 15 March 2012, Turiaf was traded to the Denver Nuggets along with JaVale McGee in a three-way trade involving the Denver Nuggets, the Los Angeles Clippers and the Washington Wizards. He was waived by the Nuggets shortly afterwards.

On 21 March 2012, Turiaf signed with the Miami Heat. On 21 June 2012 Turiaf won his first NBA championship.

=== Los Angeles Clippers ===
On 27 July 2012, Turiaf signed with the Los Angeles Clippers. Turiaf made 65 appearances for Los Angeles during the 2012–13 NBA season, recording averages of 1.9 points, 2.3 rebounds, and 0.5 assists.

=== Minnesota Timberwolves ===
On 18 July 2013, Turiaf signed with the Minnesota Timberwolves. He managed 31 games for Minnesota in 2013–14, but only two games in 2014–15 after being ruled out for the rest of the season on 16 December 2014, after undergoing a successful arthroscopic procedure on his right hip. Three days later, he was acquired by the Philadelphia 76ers in a three-team trade that involved the Timberwolves and the Houston Rockets. He was waived by the 76ers on 23 December 2014.

Turiaf announced his retirement from basketball on 24 October 2016, almost two years after having appeared in his last game and after having been plagued by hip pain for a long time.

== National team career ==
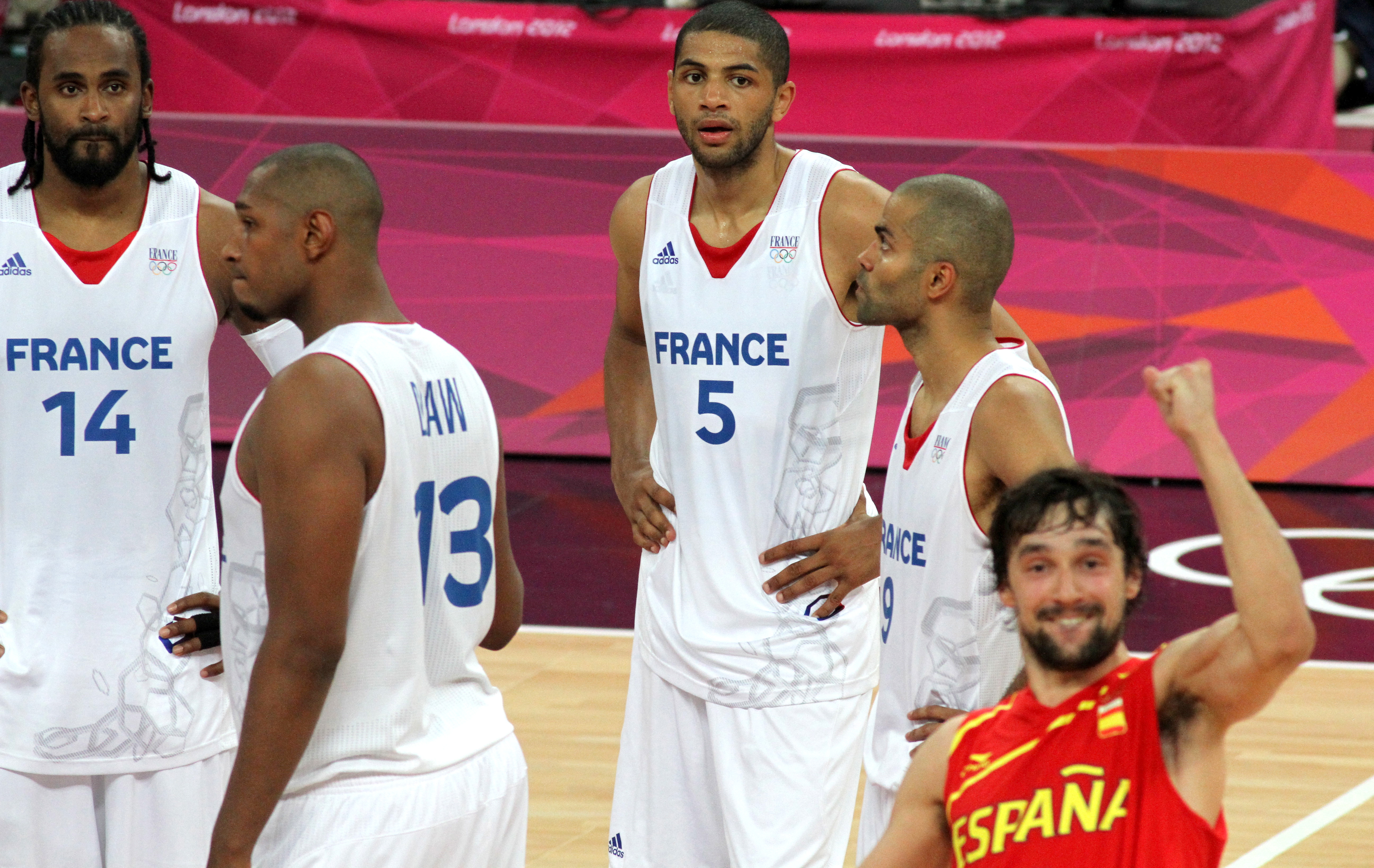
Turiaf (far left) with the French national team in 2012

Turiaf represented the senior French national team internationally. With France, he competed at the following major tournaments: the 2003 EuroBasket, the 2006 FIBA World Championship, the 2007 EuroBasket, the 2009 EuroBasket, and the 2012 London Summer Olympics.

== NBA career statistics ==
Legend
GP	Games played	GS	Games started	MPG	Minutes per game
FG%	Field goal percentage	3P%	3-point field goal percentage	FT%	Free throw percentage
RPG	Rebounds per game	APG	Assists per game	SPG	Steals per game
BPG	Blocks per game	PPG	Points per game	**Bold**	Career high
†	Won an NBA championship

=== Regular season ===
Year	Team	GP	GS	MPG	FG%	3P%	FT%	RPG	APG	SPG	BPG	PPG
2005–06	L.A. Lakers	23	1	7.0	.500	.000	.556	1.6	.3	.1	.4	2.0
2006–07	L.A. Lakers	72	1	15.1	.549	.000	.664	3.6	.9	.2	1.1	5.3
2007–08	L.A. Lakers	78	21	18.7	.474	.000	.753	3.9	1.6	.4	1.4	**6.6**
2008–09	Golden State	**79**	**26**	**21.5**	.508	.000	**.790**	4.6	**2.1**	.4	**2.1**	5.9
2009–10	Golden State	42	20	20.8	.582	.000	.474	4.5	**2.1**	.5	1.3	4.9
2010–11	New York	64	21	17.8	.632	.000	.622	3.2	1.4	.5	1.1	4.2
2011–12	Washington	4	0	14.5	**1.000**	.000	.000	3.0	1.3	**1.5**	.8	1.5
2011–12†	Miami	13	5	17.0	.533	.000	.591	4.5	.4	.6	1.1	3.5
2012–13	L.A. Clippers	65	0	10.8	.505	.000	.365	2.3	.5	.3	.5	1.9
2013–14	Minnesota	31	10	19.5	.598	.000	.420	**5.6**	.8	.3	1.6	4.8
2014–15	Minnesota	2	0	9.5	.000	.000	.000	.5	1.0	.0	.0	.0
Career		473	105	17.0	.533	.000	.636	3.7	1.3	.4	1.3	4.7

=== Playoffs ===
Year	Team	GP	GS	MPG	FG%	3P%	FT%	RPG	APG	SPG	BPG	PPG
2006	L.A. Lakers	3	0	8.3	.600	.000	**.833**	2.3	.0	.0	.3	3.7
2007	L.A. Lakers	4	0	**12.0**	.357	.000	.700	**3.0**	.3	**.5**	.3	4.3
2008	L.A. Lakers	**19**	0	9.8	.389	.000	.588	1.4	.3	.1	.9	2.0
2011	New York	4	4	18.8	.667	.000	.700	2.8	**1.0**	.3	**1.5**	**5.8**
2012†	Miami	12	**7**	10.1	.556	.000	.273	2.6	.1	.1	.7	1.9
2013	L.A. Clippers	5	0	11.8	**.700**	.000	.500	1.6	.0	.2	.6	3.2
Career		47	11	11.0	.495	.000	.586	2.0	.2	.1	.8	2.7

== Personal life ==
Turiaf can speak five languages: French, English, Spanish, Italian, and Antillean Creole (his native language). He has four younger sisters: Elodie, Florence, Nadia, and Rachelle.

In August 2009, Turiaf set up his "Heart to Heart" Foundation to provide medical care to children who do not have health insurance and cannot afford the care they need. According to the Foundation's website, the mission is "to provide support, including echocardiograms to people with heart related issues so they can live a healthy and happy life."

== See also ==
- List of European basketball players in the United States
