= 2007–08 Los Angeles Lakers season =

Season of National Basketball Association team the Los Angeles Lakers

- Conference champions
- Division champions
- Head coach: Phil Jackson
- President: Jim Buss (vice)
- General manager: Mitch Kupchak
- Owner: Jerry Buss
- Arena: Staples Center

Results
- Record: 57–25 (.695)
- Place: Division: 1st (Pacific); Conference: 1st (Western)
- Playoff finish: NBA Finals (lost to Celtics 2–4)
- Stats at Basketball Reference

Local media
- Television: Home: FS West HD Away: KCAL 9 HD
- Radio: AM 570 KLAC

The 2007–08 Los Angeles Lakers season was the 60th season in the history of the franchise; it was also the team's 59th season in the National Basketball Association (NBA) and its 48th in Los Angeles. During the offseason, the Lakers re-signed point guard Derek Fisher. The team finished the regular season with 57 wins, finishing with the most wins in the tightest conference race in NBA history. The Lakers clinched the top seed in the playoffs for the 29th time in franchise history. This 15-game turnaround from the prior season has been attributed to the progress of the team's bench players and to a mid-season trade for All-Star power forward Pau Gasol. The Lakers sold out all 41 home games for the season. After 12 seasons in the NBA, Kobe Bryant was named the 2008 NBA Most Valuable Player for the first and only time in his career.

In the playoffs, the Lakers swept the Denver Nuggets in four games in the first round, defeated the Utah Jazz in six games in the Western Conference Semifinals, and defeated the defending NBA champion San Antonio Spurs in five games in the Conference Finals to advance to the NBA Finals. In the NBA Finals, the Lakers faced off against their rivals, the Boston Celtics, renewing their storied rivalry and marking the first time the two teams faced off against each other in the NBA Finals since 1987. The Lakers were defeated by the Celtics in six games; the team's NBA Finals run ended with a 39-point loss to the Celtics.

== Key dates ==
- June 28: The 2007 NBA draft took place in New York City.
- July 1: The free agency period started.
- October 7: The preseason started with a home game versus the Utah Jazz.
- October 28: The regular season started with a home game versus the Houston Rockets.
- February 16–17: The 2008 NBA All-Star Weekend took place.
- March 2: The Lakers matched their previous season win total (42) with an overtime win against the Dallas Mavericks.
- April 11: The Lakers clinched the Pacific Division title with a win over the New Orleans Hornets.
- April 15: The Lakers clinched the Western Conference title and concluded the regular season with a game against the Sacramento Kings.
- April 20: The Lakers played their first playoff game of the season.
- June 17: The Lakers played their final game of the playoffs against the Boston Celtics in the NBA Finals, losing 92–131.

== Roster changes ==
=== Injuries and surgeries ===
Following the 2006–07 NBA season, their offseason was marred with surgeries to their two key players. The first of which was Lamar Odom having shoulder surgery which made him miss the first five games of the 2007–08 NBA season. The other was Kwame Brown having shoulder surgery also.

=== Signings ===
The Lakers' first signing was their first-round draft pick Javaris Crittenton. Then the Lakers re-signed Luke Walton to a six-year contract extension worth $30 million. Chris Mihm also signed a new contract for two years despite missing the entire previous season after having surgery on his right ankle. Walton was a key player last season while Mihm was sidelined for the whole season.

The most notable signing of the Lakers off-season was past hero Derek Fisher, signed to a three-year deal worth approximately $14 million. Fisher was released from the Utah Jazz at his request during the offseason so his family could move to a city that has better treatment for his daughter, who was diagnosed with retinoblastoma. The Lakers signed him in order to add stability at the point and they needed a player who was well versed in the triangle offense. The Lakers were also hoping that signing a former veteran of the Lakers would ease Bryant's demand to be traded.

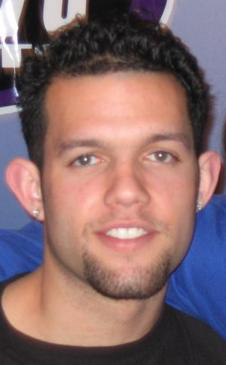
Jordan Farmar

Andrew Bynum and Jordan Farmar had their 4th-year and 3rd-year contracts extended respectively. This kept each player with the team for at least one more year.

D. J. Mbenga and rookie Coby Karl were also signed with the team to fill roster spots. Coby Karl, the son of Nuggets coach George Karl, switched between the NBDL and Lakers roster throughout the season. During midseason, injuries plagued the team and Ira Newble was signed to a ten-day contract. After this he signed a contract for the rest of the season.

=== Departures ===
The most notable departure was last year's starting point guard Smush Parker to the Miami Heat. Aaron McKie left the Lakers and became a voluntary coach for the 76ers. After spending one year with the Lakers, Shammond Williams left via free agency to play for Pamesa Valencia of the ACB.

=== Trades ===
Early in the season the Lakers traded Maurice Evans and under-achieving power forward Brian Cook for forward Trevor Ariza. Ariza would average 6.5 points per game, averaging only 18 minutes per game. Ariza broke his foot in practice on January 20 and missed the rest of the regular season. He returned to the Lakers on May 23.

After Andrew Bynum was injured for the rest of the season, the Lakers needed help in the front court before they risked falling out of contention in the playoff race. In February, the Lakers traded Kwame Brown, Javaris Crittenton, Aaron McKie (who was re-signed specifically for the trade), the draft rights to Marc Gasol, two first-round draft picks (2008 and 2010) and cash for Pau Gasol and a second-round draft pick in 2010. Many consider the Lakers the major benefactor of the trade. As a result, some criticized the trade as being unbalanced in excessively benefiting the Lakers. Gregg Popovich called Memphis' agreement to the terms of the trade "beyond comprehension" and suggested that the league should form a committee to "scratch all trades that make no sense". The trade became an immediate success for the Lakers, who went 22–5 with Gasol in the lineup and went on to reach the NBA Finals.

=== Draft picks ===
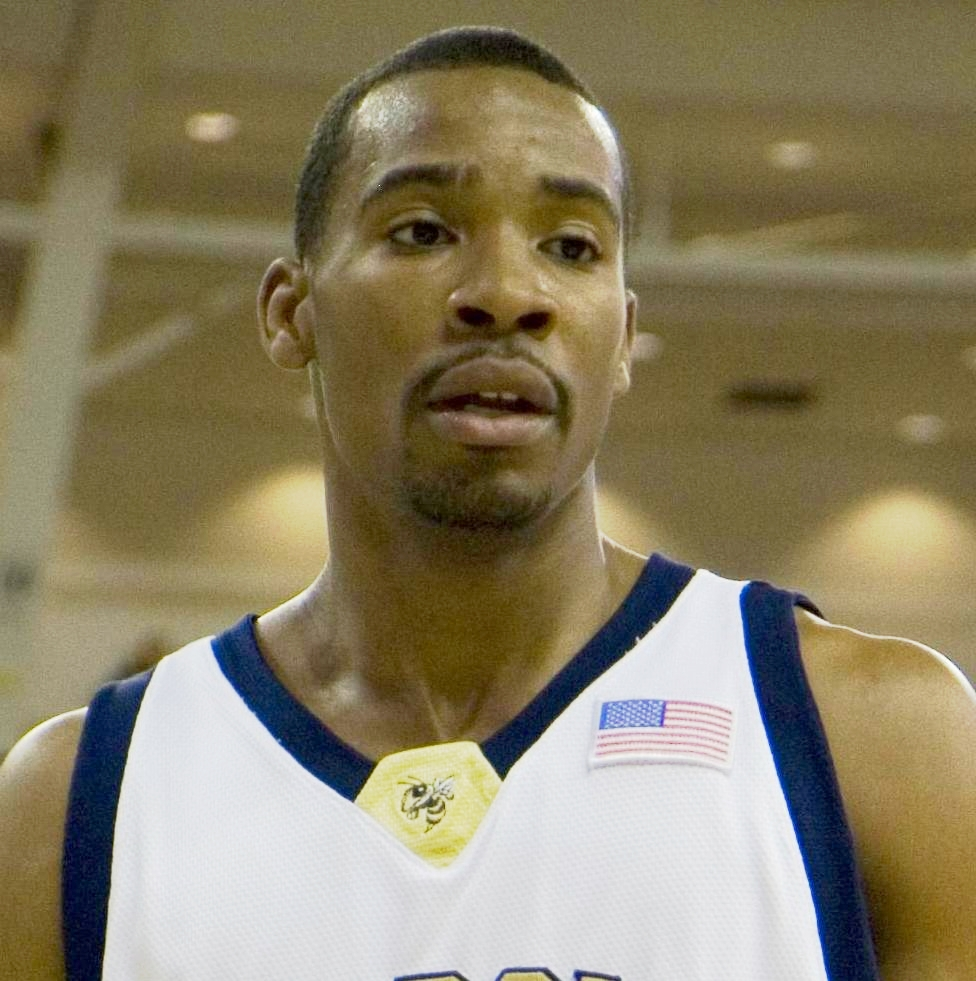
The Lakers first-round draft pick, Javaris Crittenton

Los Angeles had three selections for the 2007 NBA draft. With their first-round pick, the Lakers selected Georgia Tech freshman point guard Javaris Crittenton. With their second pick coming from the Bobcats, the Lakers selected the 6-foot-9-inch (2.06 m) Chinese player Sun Yue. And with their final pick the Lakers selected Pau Gasol's younger brother, Marc. Marc Gasol and Crittenton were both traded midseason for Pau Gasol. Sun Yue spent the entire 2007–08 season playing in the ABA and China national basketball team and only played 10 games total in the NBA.

Round	Pick	Player	Position	Nationality	School/Club team
1	19	Javaris Crittenton	Point guard	United States	Georgia Tech
2	40	Sun Yue	Point guard	China	Beijing Olympians (ABA)
2	48	Marc Gasol	Center	Spain	Akasvayu Girona (Spain)

== Roster ==
2007–08 Los Angeles Lakers roster
Players

Pos.	No.	Player	Height	Weight	DOB	From
SF	3	Trevor Ariza	6 ft 8 in (2.03 m)	220 lb (100 kg)	1985-06-30	UCLA
SG	24	Kobe Bryant	6 ft 6 in (1.98 m)	205 lb (93 kg)	1978-08-23	Lower Merion HS (PA)
C	17	Andrew Bynum	7 ft 0 in (2.13 m)	285 lb (129 kg)	1987-10-27	St. Joseph HS (NJ)
PG	5	Jordan Farmar	6 ft 2 in (1.88 m)	180 lb (82 kg)	1986-11-30	UCLA
PG	2	Derek Fisher	6 ft 1 in (1.85 m)	210 lb (95 kg)	1974-08-09	Little Rock
F/C	16	Pau Gasol	7 ft 0 in (2.13 m)	260 lb (118 kg)	1980-07-06	Spain
SG	11	Coby Karl	6 ft 5 in (1.96 m)	215 lb (98 kg)	1983-03-06	Boise State
C	28	D. J. Mbenga	7 ft 0 in (2.13 m)	215 lb (98 kg)	1980-12-30	DR Congo
C	31	Chris Mihm	7 ft 0 in (2.13 m)	245 lb (111 kg)	1979-07-16	Texas
SF	14	Ira Newble	6 ft 0 in (1.83 m)	235 lb (107 kg)	1975-01-20	Miami (OH)
PF	7	Lamar Odom	6 ft 10 in (2.08 m)	230 lb (104 kg)	1979-11-06	Rhode Island
SF	10	Vladimir Radmanović	6 ft 10 in (2.08 m)	235 lb (107 kg)	1980-11-19	Serbia
C	21	Ronny Turiaf	6 ft 10 in (2.08 m)	249 lb (113 kg)	1983-01-13	Gonzaga University
SF	4	Luke Walton	6 ft 8 in (2.03 m)	235 lb (107 kg)	1980-03-28	Arizona
PF	54	Kwame Brown	6 ft 10 in (2.08 m)	270 lb (122 kg)	1982-03-10	Glynn Academy
PF	43	Brian Cook	6 ft 9 in (2.06 m)	234 lb (106 kg)	1980-12-4	Illinois
SG	1	Javaris Crittenton	6 ft 5 in (1.96 m)	200 lb (91 kg)	1987-12-31	Georgia Tech
SG	6	Maurice Evans	6 ft 5 in (1.96 m)	220 lb (100 kg)	1978-11-08	Texas
PG	18	Sasha Vujacic	6 ft 7 in (2.01 m)	195 lb (88 kg)	1984-03-08

Coaches
Head coach
- Phil Jackson
Assistant(s)
- Jim Cleamons
- Frank Hamblen
- Kurt Rambis
- Brian Shaw
- Kareem Abdul-Jabbar
- Craig Hodges

Legend
- (DP) Unsigned draft pick
- (FA) Free agent
- (S) Suspended
- Injured

[https://www.basketball-reference.com/teams/LAL/2008.html https://projects.latimes.com/lakers/season/2007-2008/ Roster]
Updated: April 19, 2008

=== Roster notes ===
- Center Andrew Bynum played 35 games (his last game being on January 13, 2008) but missed the rest of the season and the playoffs due to a left knee injury.

== Season summary ==
Following the 2006–07 NBA season the future of Kobe Bryant's career as a Laker fell into doubt, when he demanded to be traded. For a week he tiraded and the situation escalated when a videotape about him was released. The video recorded him saying that the Lakers should have traded Andrew Bynum for Jason Kidd. Bryant insulted Bynum and was critical of General Manager Mitch Kupchak. Management decided to re-sign Derek Fisher, a past hero, but the Lakers would enter the season frustrated and with question marks.

The Lakers started the 2007–08 NBA season surprisingly well. Fueled by the emergence of Andrew Bynum as a main option at center and the return of Derek Fisher, the Lakers would even enjoy being the number one team in the Western Conference for three days. Capped by an early-season trade for Trevor Ariza, rumors of Bryant wanting to leave Los Angeles were finally beginning to die. However, before the Lakers could savor their new success, Bynum would go down with a knee injury that would take him out for the remainder of the season. Suddenly, the contending Lakers lost three straight games. The remainder of the season looked bleak for the Lakers, who were struggling to win games. It seemed that injuries, once again, would cripple another Laker season.

On February 1, the Lakers dealt the unpopular Kwame Brown (who was booed viciously by the fans for his many turnovers in recent games), rookie Javaris Crittenton, veteran Aaron McKie, the draft rights to his brother Marc Gasol, and first-round picks in 2008 and 2010 for Spaniard all-star forward Pau Gasol and a second-round draft choice in 2010. With the Lakers now having a center and power forward who are both 7 feet (2.1 m) tall, analysts have referred to Gasol and Bynum as "the twin towers", similar to the duo of Tim Duncan and David Robinson in the late 1990s and early 2000s. Even while waiting for Bynum's return, the Lakers were playing very well and got a second taste of being best in the Western Conference.

With Kobe Bryant leading the charge with his MVP-caliber season, the month of April was successful for the Lakers, who quickly surged to the top of Western Conference. Aided by Pau Gasol and Lamar Odom's play as second and third options respectively, the Lakers clinched their playoff berth for the 55th time in their 60 years with the league, won the Pacific Division from the Phoenix Suns (their first since Shaq left in 2004), and clinched the number one seed in the Western Conference for the first time since the 1999–2000 NBA season. Kobe Bryant publicly announced his desire to remain as a Laker. During the second round against the Utah Jazz, Byrant was officially named the 2007–2008 NBA Most Valuable Player award, to which he promised the fans that the team would "play until June", that he was "very proud to represent [the] organization, to represent [the] city" and thanked his teammates for helping him win the MVP award for the first time in his 12-season career. He said, "the special thing about this award is that we have done it together. I can't stress it enough. This is not an individual award."

Furthermore, the team had bonded during training camp last October in Honolulu when Lamar Odom hired a chef to cook for the team. "I won't take the credit", Odom said, "but in training camp we became tighter. I made sure we had a chef. We ate dinner, lunch and breakfast together every day at training camp. I think that was special. I think that's when the bond started." Additionally, Byrant's behavior towards his teammates changed as well. "It's the little things, taking guys out to dinner, talking to guys more about things", Luke Walton said. "He's such a great player, I think sometimes it gets frustrating if we don't understand something. But he's taking the time to explain what guys are doing out there a little more. I think before he used to be a little more negative towards his teammates, as opposed to now, when he's pulling people to the side, talking to them, finding out ways to figure it out together instead of just coming down hard on them. He's definitely more patient. He's having more fun. I think he's enjoying it more, especially with the team going like this."

== Playoffs summary ==
=== Denver Nuggets ===
In Pau Gasol's playoff debut with the Lakers, he scored 36 points, with 16 rebounds, 8 assists and 3 blocked shots, as the Lakers beat the Nuggets in Game 1. After Game 1, Kobe Bryant publicly announced his desire to remain as a Laker. Kobe Bryant gave the fans a vintage performance in Game 2 by scoring 49 points and adding 10 assists in a blowout at Staples Center. Game 2 against the Nuggets would mark a playoff first in which Lakers rookie guard Coby Karl became the first player to go against his coaching father, George Karl, in an NBA playoff game. The Nuggets were routed at home in Game 3, with Carmelo Anthony stating the team quit in the second half. Game 4 was closer, but Bryant led the Lakers with 14 points in the last five and a half minutes to close out the Nuggets at the Pepsi Center. The Lakers were the only team in 2008 to sweep an opponent in the playoffs.

=== Utah Jazz ===
The Lakers faced the Utah Jazz in the second round of the playoffs which began on May 4 at Staples Center. It was the first time the two franchises had competed in a post-season series since the 1998 Western Conference finals. Kobe Bryant and Derek Fisher, and Utah Head Coach Jerry Sloan and Assistant Coach Phil Johnson, were the only individuals present from the 1998 series that were in this series. Conversely, it was also the first play-off series meeting between Coach Sloan and Lakers' Head Coach Phil Jackson since the Chicago Bulls defeated the Jazz in the NBA Finals that same year. The Lakers took game 1 at Staples Center, winning by 11 against the Jazz. During Game 2 against the Utah Jazz, Bryant was officially named the 2007–2008 NBA Most Valuable Player award, to which he promised the fans that the team would "play until June", that he was "very proud to represent [the] organization, to represent [the] city" and thanked his teammates for helping him win the MVP award for the first time in his 12-season career. He said, "the special thing about this award is that we have done it together. I can't stress it enough. This is not an individual award." After being presented the trophy Bryant led his team to their second victory with 34 points, 8 rebounds, and 6 assists. Having a 6–0 record in the playoffs, the Lakers traveled to Utah to play the third and fourth games of the series. However their streak would come to a sudden halt. The Jazz won both Games 3 and 4 to even up the series with Deron Williams and Carlos Boozer, who bounced back after having two terrible games at L.A., leading the team. Game 4 went to overtime which the Lakers lost for the first time this season. The series would head back to Los Angeles tied 2–2. The Lakers came back with authority as they took Game 5 with Bryant, Gasol, and Odom scoring 20-plus points each. The Jazz looked to force a Game 7 but the Lakers closed out the series in Game 6 in Utah to end the series 4–2. Their victory on the road against the Jazz marked not only an impressive road win against a team with the best home record in the league, but also the second victory a road team had notched against a home team in the entire 2007–2008 playoff Conference semifinals, as home teams had won at a 22–2 pace.

=== San Antonio Spurs ===
The Lakers went on to face the San Antonio Spurs in the conference finals. The two teams combined to win seven of the last nine NBA Championships. The Lakers were able to overcome a 20-point deficit in game 1 and win behind Kobe Bryant's 27 points, with 25 being scored in the second half. Game 2 was a cruise for the Lakers as they made a 9–0 run before halftime and built the lead to 30. For the third straight series the Lakers started off 2–0. This also marked Ariza playing for the first time since breaking a bone in his right foot in January. The Spurs easily took game 3 in San Antonio with Manu Ginóbili carrying the Spurs after two terrible games in L.A. The Lakers barely escaped Game 4 with a narrow win after Brent Barry missed a last second three-pointer due to a "missed foul call" on Derek Fisher, even though Bryant, Gregg Popovich, and Phil Jackson all agreed that it was not a foul. The NBA head office, however, admitted the next day that a foul should have been called, which would have given one of the league's top free throw shooters a chance to tie the game. Heading home up 3–1 in the series, the Lakers trailed in the first quarter by 17 but were able to cut the lead to six by halftime. Again, Bryant stepped up by scoring 17 of his 39 points in the fourth quarter and the Lakers surged ahead to take a 100–92 victory behind their home crowd for a chance to win championship no. 15. They also improved to 4–0 against San Antonio in the Western Conference finals.

=== Boston Celtics ===
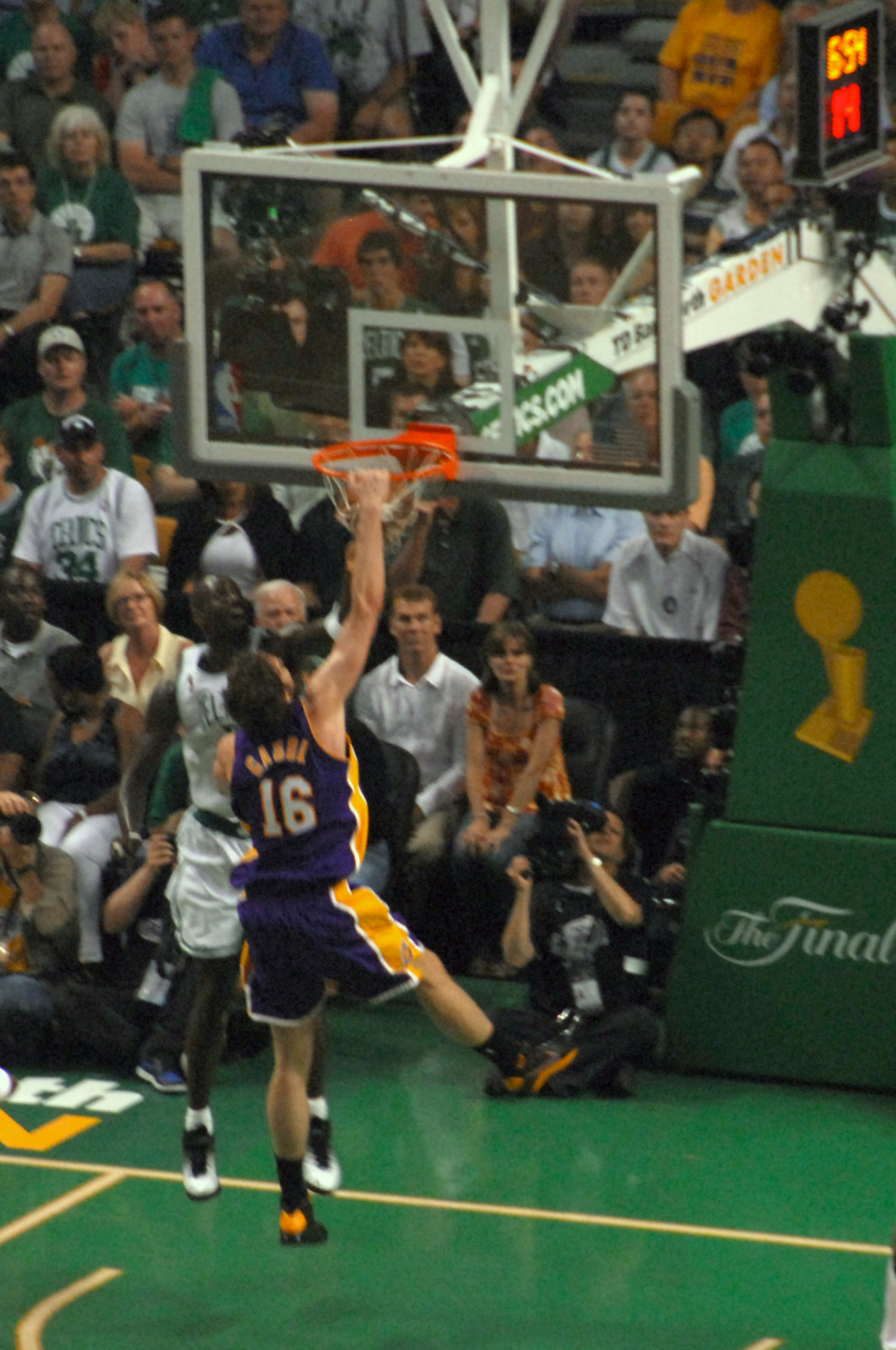
Dunk by Pau Gasol in Game 2 of the NBA Finals

The Lakers were able to reach the NBA Finals again as the no. 1 seed. The last time this happened to the team was during 2000, where they beat the Indiana Pacers 4–2. The Lakers looked to renew their rivalry with the Boston Celtics as the two matched up for the 11th time in the NBA Finals. The Celtics own an 8–2 record all-time against the Lakers in the NBA Finals, but were defeated by Los Angeles the last two times they met in 1985 and 1987. Entering the finals, the Celtics and the Lakers held the record for most Finals appearances (Celtics 19, Lakers 28) including the 2008 Finals, and most championships (Celtics 16, Lakers 14). The Celtics went on to win the Finals 4–2 for their 17th NBA championship.

== Standings ==
Pacific Division	W	L	PCT	GB	Home	Road	Div
c-Los Angeles Lakers	57	25	.695	–	30–11	27–14	12–4
x-Phoenix Suns	55	27	.671	2	30–11	25–16	10–6
Golden State Warriors	48	34	.585	9	27–14	21–20	10–6
Sacramento Kings	38	44	.463	19	26–15	12–29	3–13
Los Angeles Clippers	23	59	.284	34	13–28	10–31	5–11

#	Western Conference				
#	Team	W	L	PCT	GB
1	c-Los Angeles Lakers	57	25	.695	–
2	y-New Orleans Hornets	56	26	.683	1
3	x-San Antonio Spurs	56	26	.683	1
4	y-Utah Jazz	54	28	.659	3
5	x-Houston Rockets	55	27	.671	2
6	x-Phoenix Suns	55	27	.671	2
7	x-Dallas Mavericks	51	31	.622	6
8	x-Denver Nuggets	50	32	.610	7
9	Golden State Warriors	48	34	.585	9
10	Portland Trail Blazers	41	41	.500	16
11	Sacramento Kings	38	44	.463	19
12	Los Angeles Clippers	23	59	.280	34
13	Minnesota Timberwolves	22	60	.268	35
14	Memphis Grizzlies	22	60	.268	35
15	Seattle SuperSonics	20	62	.244	37

== Game log ==
=== Pre-season ===
2007 preseason game log
Total: 3–4
Preseason

Game	Date	Team	Score	High points	High rebounds	High assists	Location Attendance	Record
1	October 9	Golden State	L 110-111	Vladimir Radmanović (20)	Andrew Bynum (12)	Kobe Bryant (5)	Stan Sheriff Center (Honolulu, HI); 8,063	0–1
2	October 11	Golden State	L 106-119	Fisher & Radmanović (12)	Andrew Bynum (6)	Kobe Bryant (8)	Stan Sheriff Center (Honolulu, HI); 10,300	0–2
3	October 18	Seattle	W 126-106	Kobe Bryant (20)	Andrew Bynum (10)	Jordan Farmar (7)	Rabobank Arena (Bakersfield, CA); 6,016	1–2
4	October 20	Charlotte	W 113-93	Vladimir Radmanović (14)	Andrew Bynum (8)	Luke Walton (10)	Staples Center; 14,252	2-2
5	October 21	L.A. Clippers	L 96-112	Jordan Farmar (19)	Brian Cook (8)	Jordan Farmar (5)	Staples Center; 12,025	2–3
6	October 23	Utah	L 81-102	Kobe Bryant (15)	Ronny Turiaf (10)	Jordan Farmar (7)	Honda Center (Anaheim, CA); 12,514	2–4
	October 25	Utah	Cancelled due to October 2007 California wildfires				San Diego Sports Arena (San Diego, CA)	
7	October 26	Sacramento	W 101-97	Bynum & Turaf (18)	Ronny Turiaf (8)	Luke Walton (8)	Thomas & Mack Center (Las Vegas, NV); 10,089	3–4

2007–08 season schedule

=== Regular season ===
2007–08 game log
Total: 57–25 (home: 30–11; road: 27–14)
October: 0–1 (home: 0–1; road: 0–0)

Game	Date	Team	Score	High points	High rebounds	High assists	Location Attendance	Record
1	October 30	Houston	L 93-95	Kobe Bryant (45)	Brown & Bryant (8)	Bryant & Walton (4)	Staples Center; 18,997	0–1

November: 9–6 (home: 6–2; road: 3–4)

Game	Date	Team	Score	High points	High rebounds	High assists	Location Attendance	Record
2	November 2	@ Phoenix	W 119-98	Vladimir Radmanović (19)	Andrew Bynum (13)	Kobe Bryant (4)	US Airways Center; 18,422	1-1
3	November 4	Utah	W 119-109	Kobe Bryant (33)	Andrew Bynum (9)	Luke Walton (6)	Staples Center; 18,997	2–1
4	November 6	New Orleans	L 104-118	Kobe Bryant (28)	Andrew Bynum (13)	Kobe Bryant (7)	Staples Center; 18,997	2-2
5	November 9	Minnesota	W 107-93	Kobe Bryant (30)	3 players tied (10)	Derek Fisher (9)	Staples Center; 18,997	3–2
6	November 13	@ San Antonio	L 92-107	Kobe Bryant (18)	Andrew Bynum (12)	Kobe Bryant (5)	AT&T Center; 18,797	3-3
7	November 14	@ Houston	W 93-90	Kobe Bryant (30)	Bynum & Farmar (9)	Kobe Bryant (5)	Toyota Center; 18,178	4–3
8	November 16	Detroit	W 103-91	Lamar Odom (25)	Lamar Odom (15)	Kobe Bryant (7)	Staples Center; 18,997	5–3
9	November 18	Chicago	W 108-78	Kobe Bryant (18)	Andrew Bynum (10)	Jordan Farmar (8)	Staples Center; 18,997	6–3
10	November 20	@ Indiana	W 134-114	Kobe Bryant (32)	Andrew Bynum (10)	Ronny Turiaf (5)	Conseco Fieldhouse; 11,577	7–3
11	November 21	@ Milwaukee	L 103-110	Kobe Bryant (27)	Andrew Bynum (13)	3 players tied (4)	Bradley Center; 17,526	7–4
12	November 23	@ Boston	L 94-107	Kobe Bryant (28)	Andrew Bynum (9)	5 players tied (3)	TD Banknorth Garden; 18,624	7–5
13	November 25	New Jersey	L 100-102	Kobe Bryant (31)	Andrew Bynum (13)	Kobe Bryant (7)	Staples Center; 18,997	7–6
14	November 27	Seattle	W 106-99	Kobe Bryant (35)	Andrew Bynum (10)	Derek Fisher (8)	Staples Center; 18,997	8–6
15	November 29	Denver	W 127-99	Kobe Bryant (24)	Andrew Bynum (13)	Kobe Bryant (7)	Staples Center; 18,997	9–6
16	November 30	@ Utah	L 96-120	Kobe Bryant (28)	Andrew Bynum (10)	Luke Walton (6)	EnergySolutions Arena; 19,911	9–7

December: 10–4 (home: 5–2; road: 5–2)

Game	Date	Team	Score	High points	High rebounds	High assists	Location Attendance	Record
17	December 2	Orlando	L 97-104	Kobe Bryant (28)	Lamar Odom (17)	Bryant & Fisher (5)	Staples Center; 18,997	9–8
18	December 4	@ Minnesota	W 116-95	Kobe Bryant (20)	Lamar Odom (9)	Kobe Bryant (5)	Target Center; 17,513	10–8
19	December 5	@ Denver	W 111-107	Kobe Bryant (25)	Kobe Bryant (8)	Bryant & Fisher (5)	Pepsi Center; 19,155	11–8
20	December 9	Golden State	W 123-113	Kobe Bryant (28)	Andrew Bynum (11)	Kobe Bryant (8)	Staples Center; 18,997	12–8
21	December 13	San Antonio	W 102-97	Kobe Bryant (30)	Andrew Bynum (11)	Luke Walton (4)	Staples Center; 18,997	13–8
22	December 14	@ Golden State	L 106-108	Kobe Bryant (21)	Andrew Bynum (16)	Bryant & Odom (5)	Oracle Arena; 20,705	13–9
23	December 16	LA Clippers	W 113-92	Kobe Bryant (32)	Andrew Bynum (9)	Vladimir Radmanović (6)	Staples Center; 18,997	14–9
24	December 18	@ Chicago	W 103-91	Sasha Vujačić (19)	Lamar Odom (16)	Jordan Farmar (6)	United Center; 22,310	15–9
25	December 20	@ Cleveland	L 90-94	Kobe Bryant (21)	Bynum & Odom (11)	Bryant & Fisher (5)	Quicken Loans Arena; 20,562	15–10
26	December 21	@ Philadelphia	W 106-101	Andrew Bynum (24)	Bynum & Odom (11)	Derek Fisher (7)	Wachovia Center; 17,903	16–10
27	December 23	@ New York	W 95-90	Kobe Bryant (39)	Kobe Bryant (11)	Kobe Bryant (8)	Madison Square Garden; 19,763	17–10
28	December 25	Phoenix	W 122-115	Kobe Bryant (38)	Lamar Odom (14)	Kobe Bryant (7)	Staples Center; 18,997	18–10
29	December 28	Utah	W 123-109	Kobe Bryant (31)	Andrew Bynum (9)	Derek Fisher (8)	Staples Center; 18,997	19–10
30	December 30	Boston	L 91-110	Kobe Bryant (22)	Lamar Odom (10)	3 players tied (3)	Staples Center; 18,997	19–11

January: 9–5 (home: 6–2; road: 3–3)

Game	Date	Team	Score	High points	High rebounds	High assists	Location Attendance	Record
31	January 4	Philadelphia	W 124-93	Javaris Crittenton (19)	Andrew Bynum (16)	4 players tied (4)	Staples Center; 18,997	20–11
32	January 6	Indiana	W 112-96	Kobe Bryant (26)	Bynum & Odom (13)	Luke Walton (7)	Staples Center; 18,997	21–11
33	January 8	@ Memphis	W 117-101	Derek Fisher (26)	Lamar Odom (15)	Bryant & Odom (6)	FedEx Forum; 14,981	22–11
34	January 9	@ New Orleans	W 109-80	Kobe Bryant (19)	Andrew Bynum (9)	Kobe Bryant (7)	New Orleans Arena; 15,605	23–11
35	January 11	Milwaukee	W 110-105	Kobe Bryant (37)	Andrew Bynum (17)	Kobe Bryant (7)	Staples Center; 18,997	24–11
36	January 13	Memphis	W 100-99	Kobe Bryant (37)	Lamar Odom (10)	Kobe Bryant (4)	Staples Center; 18,997	25–11
37	January 14	@ Seattle	W 123-121 (OT)	Kobe Bryant (48)	Lamar Odom (14)	Odom & Walton (7)	KeyArena; 13,452	26–11
38	January 17	Phoenix	L 98-106	Kobe Bryant (30)	Lamar Odom (19)	Lamar Odom (5)	Staples Center; 18,997	26–12
39	January 21	Denver	W 116-99	Derek Fisher (28)	Brown & Odom (11)	Kobe Bryant (11)	Staples Center; 18,997	27–12
40	January 23	@ San Antonio	L 91-103	Kobe Bryant (29)	Bryant & Odom (12)	Kobe Bryant (5)	AT&T Center; 18,797	27–13
41	January 25	@ Dallas	L 105-112	Kobe Bryant (40)	Kobe Bryant (10)	Bryant & Farmar (5)	American Airlines Center; 20,438	27–14
42	January 27	Cleveland	L 95-98	Kobe Bryant (33)	Kobe Bryant (12)	Kobe Bryant (6)	Staples Center; 18,997	27–15
43	January 29	New York	W 120-109	Kobe Bryant (24)	Lamar Odom (12)	Kobe Bryant (11)	Staples Center; 18,997	28–15
44	January 31	@ Detroit	L 89-90	Kobe Bryant (39)	Kobe Bryant (10)	Lamar Odom (6)	The Palace of Auburn Hills; 22,076	28–16

February: 13–2 (home: 3–0; road: 10–2)

Game	Date	Team	Score	High points	High rebounds	High assists	Location Attendance	Record
45	February 1	@ Toronto	W 121–101	Kobe Bryant (46)	Lamar Odom (10)	Lamar Odom (8)	Air Canada Centre; 19,800	29–16
46	February 3	@ Washington	W 103-91	Kobe Bryant (30)	Odom & Radmanović (7)	Odom & Turiaf (5)	Verizon Center; 20,173	30–16
47	February 5	@ New Jersey	W 105-90	Derek Fisher (28)	Lamar Odom (15)	Kobe Bryant (8)	Izod Center; 19,990	31–16
48	February 6	@ Atlanta	L 95-98	Lamar Odom (19)	Lamar Odom (11)	Kobe Bryant (10)	Philips Arena; 19,701	31–17
49	February 8	@ Orlando	W 117-113	Kobe Bryant (36)	Kobe Bryant (10)	Derek Fisher (7)	Amway Arena; 17,519	32–17
50	February 10	@ Miami	W 104-94	Kobe Bryant (33)	Lamar Odom (18)	Lamar Odom (6)	American Airlines Arena; 19,600	33–17
51	February 11	@ Charlotte	W 106-97	Kobe Bryant (31)	Lamar Odom (10)	Gasol & Odom (6)	Charlotte Bobcats Arena; 19,270	34–17
52	February 13	@ Minnesota	W 117-92	Kobe Bryant (29)	Lamar Odom (16)	Lamar Odom (10)	Target Center; 13,874	35–17
All-Star Break
53	February 19	Atlanta	W 122-93	Bryant & Gasol (23)	Lamar Odom (15)	Luke Walton (5)	Staples Center; 18,997	36–17
54	February 20	@ Phoenix	W 130-124	Kobe Bryant (41)	Lamar Odom (11)	3 players tied (3)	US Airways Center; 18,422	37–17
55	February 23	@ L.A. Clippers	W 113-95	Pau Gasol (23)	Lamar Odom (10)	Kobe Bryant (7)	Staples Center; 20,236	38–17
56	February 24	@ Seattle	W 111-91	Pau Gasol (22)	Lamar Odom (11)	Kobe Bryant (10)	KeyArena at Seattle Center; 17,072	39–17
57	February 26	Portland	W 96-83	Kobe Bryant (30)	Lamar Odom (11)	Kobe Bryant (7)	Staples Center; 18,997	40–17
58	February 28	Miami	W 106-88	Jordan Farmar (24)	Ronny Turiaf (12)	Kobe Bryant (8)	Staples Center; 18,997	41–17
59	February 29	@ Portland	L 111-119	Kobe Bryant (33)	Lamar Odom (12)	Kobe Bryant (5)	Rose Garden; 20,651	41–18

March: 9–6 (home: 5–4; road: 4–2)

Game	Date	Team	Score	High points	High rebounds	High assists	Location Attendance	Record
60	March 2	Dallas	W 108-104 (OT)	Kobe Bryant (52)	Pau Gasol (14)	Pau Gasol (5)	Staples Center; 18,997	42–18
61	March 4	@ Sacramento	W 117-105	Kobe Bryant (34)	Lamar Odom (12)	Derek Fisher (6)	ARCO Center; 17,317	43–18
62	March 7	L.A. Clippers	W 119-82	Derek Fisher (17)	Pau Gasol (11)	Gasol & Turiaf (5)	Staples Center; 18,997	44–18
63	March 9	Sacramento	L 113-114	Kobe Bryant (26)	Lamar Odom (10)	Pau Gasol (9)	Staples Center; 18,997	44–19
64	March 11	Toronto	W 117-108	Kobe Bryant (34)	Lamar Odom (9)	Kobe Bryant (7)	Staples Center; 18,997	45–19
65	March 14	@ New Orleans	L 98-108	Kobe Bryant (36)	Lamar Odom (13)	Luke Walton (7)	New Orleans Arena; 18,199	45–20
66	March 16	@ Houston	L 92-104	Kobe Bryant (24)	Lamar Odom (11)	Farmar & Fisher (3)	Toyota Center; 18,409	45–21
67	March 18	@ Dallas	W 102-100	Kobe Bryant (29)	Lamar Odom (17)	Kobe Bryant (7)	American Airlines Center; 20,534	46–21
68	March 20	@ Utah	W 106-95	Kobe Bryant (27)	Lamar Odom (12)	Kobe Bryant (7)	EnergySolutions Arena; 19,911	47–21
69	March 21	Seattle	W 130-105	Kobe Bryant (23)	Lamar Odom (12)	Ronny Turiaf (6)	Staples Center; 18,997	48–21
70	March 23	Golden State	L 111-115	Kobe Bryant (36)	Lamar Odom (22)	Kobe Bryant (8)	Staples Center; 18,997	48–22
71	March 24	@ Golden State	W 123-119 (OT)	Kobe Bryant (30)	Lamar Odom (21)	Kobe Bryant (7)	Oracle Arena; 20,713	49–22
72	March 26	Charlotte	L 95-108	Kobe Bryant (27)	Lamar Odom (9)	Vladimir Radmanović (4)	Staples Center; 18,997	49–23
73	March 28	Memphis	L 111-114	Kobe Bryant (53)	Lamar Odom (11)	Lamar Odom (11)	Staples Center; 18,997	49–24
74	March 30	Washington	W 126-120 (OT)	Kobe Bryant (26)	Lamar Odom (13)	Kobe Bryant (13)	Staples Center; 18,997	50–24

April: 7–1 (home: 6–0; road: 1–1)

Game	Date	Team	Score	High points	High rebounds	High assists	Location Attendance	Record
75	April 2	Portland	W 104-91	Kobe Bryant (36)	Kobe Bryant (13)	Bryant & Gasol (7)	Staples Center; 18,997	51–24
76	April 4	Dallas	W 112-108	Lamar Odom (31)	Bryant & Odom (10)	Pau Gasol (7)	Staples Center; 18,997	52–24
77	April 6	Sacramento	W 114-92	Kobe Bryant (29)	Vladimir Radmanović (14)	Lamar Odom (7)	Staples Center; 17,317	53–24
78	April 8	@ Portland	L 103-112	Kobe Bryant (34)	Pau Gasol (13)	Jordan Farmar (6)	Rose Garden; 20,435	53–25
79	April 10	@ L.A. Clippers	W 106-78	Luke Walton (18)	Lamar Odom (13)	3 players tied (4)	Staples Center; 20,084	54–25
80	April 11	New Orleans	W 107-104	Kobe Bryant (29)	Lamar Odom (16)	Kobe Bryant (8)	Staples Center; 18,997	55–25
81	April 13	San Antonio	W 106-85	Kobe Bryant (20)	Lamar Odom (14)	Kobe Bryant (5)	Staples Center; 18,997	56–25
82	April 15	Sacramento	W 124-101	Pau Gasol (22)	Lamar Odom (12)	Ronny Turiaf (6)	Staples Center; 18,997	57–25

2007–08 season schedule

=== Playoffs ===
2008 playoff game log
Total: 14–7 (home: 10–1; road: 4–6)
First Round: 4–0 (home: 2–0; road: 2–0)

Game	Date	Team	Score	High points	High rebounds	High assists	Location Attendance	Series
1	April 20	Denver	W 128–114	Pau Gasol (36)	Pau Gasol (16)	Pau Gasol (8)	Staples Center; 18,997	1–0
2	April 23	Denver	W 122–107	Kobe Bryant (49)	Pau Gasol (10)	Kobe Bryant (10)	Staples Center; 18,997	2–0
3	April 26	@ Denver	W 102–84	Kobe Bryant (22)	3 players tied (7)	Kobe Bryant (8)	Pepsi Center; 19,602	3–0
4	April 28	@ Denver	W 107–101	Kobe Bryant (31	Lamar Odom (12)	Kobe Bryant (6)	Pepsi Center; 19,264	4–0

Conference Semifinals: 4–2 (home: 3–0; road: 1–2)

Game	Date	Team	Score	High points	High rebounds	High assists	Location Attendance	Series
1	May 4	Utah	W 109–98	Kobe Bryant (38)	Pau Gasol (10)	Kobe Bryant (7)	Staples Center; 18,997	1–0
2	May 7	Utah	W 120–110	Kobe Bryant (34)	Lamar Odom (16)	Kobe Bryant (6)	Staples Center; 18,997	2–0
3	May 9	@ Utah	L 99-104	Kobe Bryant (34)	Lamar Odom (12)	Kobe Bryant (7)	EnergySolutions Arena; 19,911	2–1
4	May 11	@ Utah	L 115–123 (OT)	Kobe Bryant (33)	Lamar Odom (13)	Kobe Bryant (10)	EnergySolutions Arena; 19,911	2–2
5	May 14	Utah	W 111–104	Kobe Bryant (26)	Lamar Odom (11)	Pau Gasol (8)	Staples Center; 18,997	3–2
6	May 16	@ Utah	W 108–105	Kobe Bryant (34)	Pau Gasol (13)	Kobe Bryant (6)	EnergySolutions Arena; 19,911	4–2

Conference Finals: 4–1 (home: 3–0; road: 1–1)

Game	Date	Team	Score	High points	High rebounds	High assists	Location Attendance	Series
1	May 21	San Antonio	W 89–85	Kobe Bryant (27)	Lamar Odom (8)	Kobe Bryant (9)	Staples Center; 18,997	1–0
2	May 23	San Antonio	W 101–71	Kobe Bryant (22)	Lamar Odom (12)	Kobe Bryant (5)	Staples Center; 18,997	2–0
3	May 25	@ San Antonio	L 84–103	Kobe Bryant (30)	Lamar Odom (11)	Lamar Odom (6)	AT&T Center; 18,797	2–1
4	May 27	@ San Antonio	W 93–91	Kobe Bryant (28)	Bryant & Gasol (10)	Pau Gasol (6)	AT&T Center; 18,797	3–1
5	May 29	San Antonio	W 100–92	Kobe Bryant (39)	Pau Gasol (19)	Pau Gasol (5)	Staples Center; 18,997	4–1

NBA Finals: 2–4 (home: 2–1; road: 0–3)

Game	Date	Team	Score	High points	High rebounds	High assists	Location Attendance	Series
1	June 5	@ Boston	L 88–98	Kobe Bryant (24)	Pau Gasol (8)	Bryant & Fisher (6)	TD Banknorth Garden; 18,624	0–1
2	June 8	@ Boston	L 102–108	Kobe Bryant (30)	Gasol & Radmanović (10)	Kobe Bryant (8)	TD Banknorth Garden; 18,624	0–2
3	June 10	Boston	W 87–81	Kobe Bryant (36)	Pau Gasol (12)	Jordan Farmar (5)	Staples Center; 18,997	1–2
4	June 12	Boston	L 91–97	Lamar Odom (19)	Gasol & Odom (10)	Kobe Bryant (10)	Staples Center; 18,997	1–3
5	June 15	Boston	W 103–98	Kobe Bryant (25)	Pau Gasol (13)	Pau Gasol (6)	Staples Center; 18,997	2–3
6	June 17	@ Boston	L 92–131	Kobe Bryant (22)	Lamar Odom (10)	Lamar Odom (5)	TD Banknorth Garden; 18,624	2–4

2008 playoff schedule

== Player stats ==
Legend
GP	Games played	GS	Games started	MPG	Minutes per game
FG%	Field-goal percentage	3P%	3-point field-goal percentage	FT%	Free-throw percentage
RPG	Rebounds per game	APG	Assists per game	SPG	Steals per game
BPG	Blocks per game	PPG	Points per game

=== Regular season ===
Player	GP	GS	MPG	FG%	3P%	FT%	RPG	APG	SPG	BPG	PPG
Trevor Ariza*	35	3	15.6	.507	.278	.653	3.1	1.3	.89	.31	5.5
Kobe Bryant	82	82	38.9	.459	.361	.840	6.3	5.4	1.84	.49	28.3
Andrew Bynum	35	25	28.8	.636	.000	.695	10.2	1.7	.34	2.06	13.1
Jordan Farmar	82	0	20.6	.461	.371	.679	2.2	2.7	.94	.06	9.1
Derek Fisher	82	82	27.4	.436	.406	.883	2.1	2.9	1.05	.04	11.7
Pau Gasol*	66	66	35.6	.534	.250	.807	8.4	3.2	.45	1.48	18.9
Didier Ilunga-Mbenga*	42	0	7.8	.464	.000	.417	1.7	.2	.17	.62	2.0
Coby Karl	17	0	4.2	.346	.308	.800	.8	.5	.24	.12	1.8
Chris Mihm	23	5	12.1	.337	.000	.667	3.3	.6	.17	.61	3.6
Ira Newble*	49	13	14.2	.437	.327	.769	2.6	.4	.57	.16	3.8
Lamar Odom	77	77	37.9	.525	.274	.698	10.6	3.5	.97	.94	14.2
Vladimir Radmanović	65	41	22.8	.453	.406	.800	3.3	1.9	.71	.18	8.4
Ronny Turiaf	78	21	18.7	.474	.000	.753	3.9	1.6	.36	1.38	6.6
Sasha Vujačić	72	0	17.8	.454	.437	.835	2.1	1.0	.50	.07	8.8
Luke Walton	74	31	23.4	.450	.333	.706	3.9	2.9	.81	.24	7.2

*Total for entire season including previous team(s)

=== Playoffs ===
Player	GP	GS	MPG	FG%	3P%	FT%	RPG	APG	SPG	BPG	PPG
Trevor Ariza	8	0	5.6	.583	.250	.500	1.4	.1	.13	.13	2.1
Kobe Bryant	21	21	41.1	.479	.302	.809	5.7	5.6	1.67	.38	30.1
Jordan Farmar	21	0	17.1	.383	.386	.875	1.6	1.3	.33	.19	5.7
Derek Fisher	21	21	31.6	.452	.440	.836	2.2	2.5	2.05	.14	10.2
Pau Gasol	21	21	39.8	.530	.000	.692	9.3	4.0	.52	1.90	16.9
Didier Ilunga-Mbenga	7	0	4.3	.625	.000	.000	1.3	.0	.29	.14	1.4
Coby Karl	1	0	2.0	.000	.000	.000	.0	1.0	.00	.00	.0
Chris Mihm	1	0	3.0	.000	.000	.000	.0	.0	.00	.00	.0
Ira Newble	1	0	1.0	.000	.000	.000	.0	.0	.00	.00	.0
Lamar Odom	21	21	37.4	.491	.273	.661	10.0	3.0	.67	1.29	14.3
Vladimir Radmanović	21	21	22.9	.444	.372	.833	3.8	1.5	.62	.05	8.0
Ronny Turiaf	19	0	9.8	.389	.000	.588	1.4	.3	.11	.95	2.0
Sasha Vujačić	21	0	21.7	.399	.392	.857	2.2	.8	.57	.19	8.1
Luke Walton	21	0	16.8	.454	.423	.722	2.6	2.0	.52	.19	6.0

== Awards, records and milestones ==
=== All-Star Game ===
- Kobe Bryant was named as a starter in the 2008 NBA All-Star Game.

=== Awards ===
- Kobe Bryant was named the Western Conference Player of the Week for games played January 7, 2008 through January 13, 2008.
- Kobe Bryant was named the Western Conference Player of the Week for games played February 25, 2008 through March 2, 2008.
- Kobe Bryant was named the Western Conference Player of the Month for February 2008.
- Kobe Bryant was named the Western Conference Player of the Week for games played March 31, 2008 through April 6, 2008.
- Kobe Bryant was named the Western Conference Player of the Month for April 2008.
- Phil Jackson was named the Western Conference Coach of the Month for April 2008.

=== Milestones ===
- On December 23, 2007 Kobe Bryant became the youngest NBA player to score 20,000 points.
- Sasha Vujacic set the highest 3 pointer shot percentage for a season in Lakers history (43.7%).

=== Season ===
- Kobe Bryant was named the NBA's Most Valuable Player for the 2008 season
- Kobe Bryant was named to the All-NBA Team First Team
- Kobe Bryant was named to the NBA All-Defensive Team

== Transactions ==
The Lakers have been involved in the following transactions during the 2007–08 season.

=== Trades ===
November 20, 2007	To Los Angeles Lakers Trevor Ariza	To Orlando Magic Maurice Evans, Brian Cook
February 1, 2008	To Los Angeles Lakers Pau Gasol, 2nd Rd. Draft Pick (2010)	To Memphis Grizzlies Kwame Brown, Javaris Crittenton, Aaron McKie, draft rights to Marc Gasol, Two Future 1st Rd Draft Picks (2008, 2010)

=== Free agents ===
Player	Former team
Derek Fisher	Utah Jazz
DJ Mbenga	Golden State Warriors
Ira Newble	Seattle SuperSonics

Player	New team
Smush Parker	Miami Heat
Shammond Williams	Pamesa Valencia
