= Ira Newble =

American basketball player and coach (born 1975)

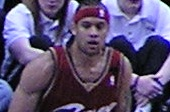
- Newble with the Cleveland Cavaliers in 2005

Personal information
- Born: January 20, 1975 (age 51) Detroit, Michigan, U.S.
- Listed height: 6 ft 7 in (2.01 m)
- Listed weight: 235 lb (107 kg)

Career information
- High school: Southfield (Southfield, Michigan)
- College: Mississippi Gulf Coast CC (1993–1995); Miami (Ohio) (1995–1997)
- NBA draft: 1997: undrafted
- Playing career: 1997–2010
- Position: Small forward / shooting guard
- Number: 3, 14
- Coaching career: 2011–2016

Career history

Playing
- 1997: Wisconsin Blast
- 1998–2000: Idaho Stampede
- 2000: Keravnos Strovolos
- 2000–2001: San Antonio Spurs
- 2001: Flint Fuze
- 2002: Atlanta Hawks
- 2002: Oklahoma Storm
- 2002–2003: Atlanta Hawks
- 2003–2008: Cleveland Cavaliers
- 2008: Seattle SuperSonics
- 2008: Los Angeles Lakers
- 2009: Bnei HaSharon
- 2009: Keravnos Strovolos
- 2009–2010: Cáceres 2016 Basket

Coaching
- 2011–2012: Canton Charge (assistant)
- 2012–2015: Austin Toros/Spurs (assistant)
- 2015–2016: Bakersfield Jam (assistant)

Career highlights
- Cyprus Basketball Division 1 champion (2000)

Career NBA statistics
- Points: 1,930 (5.1 ppg)
- Rebounds: 1,114 (2.9 rpg)
- Assists: 342 (0.9 apg)
- Stats at NBA.com
- Stats at Basketball Reference

Ira Reynolds Newble II (born January 20, 1975) is an American former professional basketball player and former coach. He played in the National Basketball Association (NBA) for the San Antonio Spurs, Atlanta Hawks, Cleveland Cavaliers, Seattle SuperSonics, and Los Angeles Lakers.

== College career ==
After graduating from Southfield High School in 1993, Newble went to Mississippi Gulf Coast Community College before attending Miami University in Ohio, where he studied sports marketing. As a senior at Miami, he averaged 11.3 points, 7.5 rebounds, and 1.2 assists per game while earning Honorable Mention All-Mid-American Conference honors.

== Professional career ==
=== Early career ===
Newble played for three seasons in the International Basketball Association (IBA) and later the Continental Basketball Association (CBA) before playing in 2000 overseas. He also played stints in the CBA in 2001 and the United States Basketball League (USBL) in 2002.

=== NBA career ===
Newble signed as a free agent with the NBA's San Antonio Spurs and his NBA debut with in the 2000–2001 season, playing in 27 games, of which he started six. In just under seven minutes per game, he averaged 2.0 points per game (ppg) and 1.3 rebounds per game (rpg). He was waived by the Spurs after the season.

He then signed with the Atlanta Hawks for the 2001–2002 season, and his playing time and production greatly increased. Playing 42 games (starting 35), he played over 30 minutes per game, averaging 8.0 ppg and 5.3 rpg, which would both be career highs for Newble. On April 13, 2002, against the Cleveland Cavaliers, Newble set a then career single-game high with 17 points and a career-high 12 rebounds. The following season, 2002–03, he played in 73 games (starting 45), averaging 7.7 ppg, 3.7 rpg, and a career-high 1.4 assists per game. On April 12, 2003, he set a career personal-best with 21 points against the Washington Wizards, then topped that two days later with 23 against the Orlando Magic.

The Cleveland Cavaliers signed Newble as a free agent in July 2003. In the 2003–04 season, in 64 games (25 as a starter) playing about 19 minutes per game, he averaged 4.0 ppg and 2.4 rpg. In 2004–05, he played a career-high 74 games (starting a career-high 69), averaging 5.9 ppg and 3.0 rpg.

Injuries hampered Newble in the 2005–06 NBA season. He missed 21 games with a right foot strain and missed 14 games with a facial abscess, limiting him to 36 games. In 2006–07, he was limited to only 15 games. In 2007–08, he bounced back, playing in 41 games for the Cavs then, on February 21, 2008, he was traded to the Seattle SuperSonics in a multi-player deal. He was waived by the Sonics one week later after playing just two games. In the 2006–07 NBA season he was a part of the team that won the Eastern Conference Championship.

In March, 2008, Newble signed a 10-day contract with the Los Angeles Lakers. Nine days later, the Lakers signed Newble for the remainder of the season. He played six games for the Lakers, ending his eight-year NBA career with 1,930 points, 1,114 rebounds, 342 assists, 204 steals and 105 blocks in 380 games.

=== European career ===
Newble started his professional career overseas in the Cypriot League playing for Keravnos Strovolos. Keravnos won the Cyprus Basketball Division 1 championship in 2000. In March 2009, he signed with Bnei HaSharon from the Israeli BSL for the remainder of the season. He joined the Greek League club Aris Thessaloniki in August 2009. He signed for Cáceres 2016 Basket in December 2009. Cáceres released him a month later.

== Coaching career ==
In 2011, Newble became an assistant coach of the Canton Charge, the new NBA Development League affiliate of Newble's former team Cleveland Cavaliers.

In 2012, Newble became an assistant coach for the Austin Toros of the NBA Development League. He would continue to coach for the Toros under their last two seasons in that name before being renamed to the Austin Spurs. On October 31, 2015, he became an assistant coach for the Bakersfield Jam.

== Darfur campaign ==
In 2007, Newble led a campaign to help bring awareness to China's involvement in the war in Darfur as a weapons supplier. Newble saw a letter that Aid Still Required had written expressing concern about investments funding the crisis. He collected signatures around the league for the letter that then was presented to the Chinese government and the President of the Olympic Committee for the 2008 Summer Olympic Games.

== NBA career statistics ==
Legend
| GP | Games played | GS | Games started | MPG | Minutes per game |
| FG% | Field goal percentage | 3P% | 3-point field goal percentage | FT% | Free throw percentage |
| RPG | Rebounds per game | APG | Assists per game | SPG | Steals per game |
| BPG | Blocks per game | PPG | Points per game | **Bold** | Career high |

=== Regular season ===
| Year | Team | GP | GS | MPG | FG% | 3P% | FT% | RPG | APG | SPG | BPG | PPG |
|---|---|---|---|---|---|---|---|---|---|---|---|---|
| 2000–01 | San Antonio | 27 | 6 | 6.8 | .382 | .444 | .500 | 1.3 | .2 | .1 | .1 | 2.0 |
| 2001–02 | Atlanta | 42 | 35 | **30.3** | **.498** | .143 | **.852** | **5.3** | 1.1 | **.9** | **.5** | **8.0** |
| 2002–03 | Atlanta | 73 | 45 | 26.5 | .495 | .381 | .778 | 3.7 | **1.4** | .7 | .4 | 7.7 |
| 2003–04 | Cleveland | 64 | 25 | 19.5 | .391 | .105 | .783 | 2.4 | 1.1 | .4 | .3 | 4.0 |
| 2004–05 | Cleveland | **74** | **69** | 24.8 | .429 | .358 | .797 | 3.0 | 1.2 | .7 | .2 | 5.9 |
| 2005–06 | Cleveland | 36 | 3 | 9.8 | .298 | .231 | .688 | 1.6 | .3 | .1 | .3 | 1.3 |
| 2006–07 | Cleveland | 15 | 1 | 8.6 | .432 | **.533** | .600 | 2.0 | .1 | .4 | .0 | 3.1 |
| 2007–08 | Cleveland | 41 | 13 | 15.9 | .449 | .333 | .769 | 2.8 | .3 | .7 | .2 | 4.3 |
| 2007–08 | Seattle | 2 | 0 | 8.5 | .286 | .000 | .000 | .0 | .5 | .0 | .0 | 2.0 |
| 2007–08 | L.A. Lakers | 6 | 0 | 5.2 | .333 | .500 | .000 | 1.8 | .5 | .2 | .2 | 1.2 |
| Career | | 380 | 197 | 20.1 | .446 | .341 | .778 | 2.9 | .9 | .5 | .3 | 5.1 |

=== Playoffs ===
| Year | Team | GP | GS | MPG | FG% | 3P% | FT% | RPG | APG | SPG | BPG | PPG |
|---|---|---|---|---|---|---|---|---|---|---|---|---|
| 2006 | Cleveland | 5 | 0 | **2.2** | **1.000** | **1.000** | .000 | **.4** | .0 | **.2** | .0 | **1.4** |
| 2007 | Cleveland | **6** | 0 | 1.7 | .000 | .000 | .000 | .2 | **.2** | .0 | .0 | .0 |
| 2008 | L.A. Lakers | 1 | 0 | 1.0 | .000 | .000 | .000 | .0 | .0 | .0 | .0 | .0 |
| Career | | 12 | 0 | 1.8 | .600 | .333 | .000 | .3 | .1 | .1 | .0 | .6 |
