= 2007–08 Seattle SuperSonics season =

NBA professional basketball team season

- Head coach: P. J. Carlesimo
- General manager: Sam Presti
- Owners: Clay Bennett
- Arena: KeyArena at Seattle Center

Results
- Record: 20–62 (.244)
- Place: Division: 5th (Northwest); Conference: 15th (Western)
- Playoff finish: Did not qualify
- Stats at Basketball Reference

Local media
- Television: KIRO-TV; KSTW; FSN Northwest
- Radio: KPTK

The 2007–08 Seattle SuperSonics season was the 41st and final season of the Seattle SuperSonics in the National Basketball Association (NBA) and the franchise's final season of play in Seattle before relocating to Oklahoma City to play as the Thunder. With the hiring of new head coach P. J. Carlesimo as replacement of Bob Hill, who was fired at the end of the previous season, the SuperSonics finished in 15th and last place in the Western Conference with a franchise worst 20–62 record. Seattle's first round draft pick and number two overall Kevin Durant was chosen as the Rookie of the Year at the end of the season.

== Offseason ==
Following Bob Hill and Rick Sund's departures as head coach and general manager respectively, President of Basketball Operations Lenny Wilkens was charged with the responsibility of finding replacements. For the general manager position, Wilkens hired Sam Presti and months later P. J. Carlesimo was appointed as head coach of the Sonics. Wilkens quit a day later. Presti's first order of business involved a trade with the Boston Celtics on draft day that sent Ray Allen and the SuperSonics' second round pick Glen Davis to Boston in exchange for the Celtics' first round pick Jeff Green, Wally Szczerbiak and Delonte West. Weeks later the free agent period began, and the SuperSonics' front office needed to reach a decision regarding Rashard Lewis' future, since Lewis opted out of his final two years and became one of the most prized free agents in the offseason. The team finally agreed to a sign and trade deal with the Orlando Magic. The other trade the Sonics made during the offseason brought 12-year veteran Kurt Thomas from the Phoenix Suns.

The SuperSonics began preparations for the regular season on July 7, kicking off Summer League games in Las Vegas. The team finished with a 2–6 overall record, with rookies Kevin Durant and Jeff Green leading the team in scoring in the majority of the matches.

=== Draft picks ===
At the 2007 Draft Lottery the SuperSonics got the second overall pick behind the Portland Trail Blazers, matching their highest overall selection in franchise history. With their first round pick the SuperSonics selected Kevin Durant from Texas and forwards Carl Landry and Glen Davis in the second round. Davis and Landry were traded on draft day to the Boston Celtics and the Houston Rockets respectively.

Round	Pick	Player	Position	Nationality	College
1	2	Kevin Durant	SF	United States	Texas
2	32	Carl Landry	PF	United States	Purdue
2	35	Glen Davis (traded to Boston)	PF	United States	LSU

== Pre-season ==
The SuperSonics kicked off a ten-game pre-season on October 9, with a 98–104 loss visiting the Sacramento Kings. Following a victory against the Cleveland Cavaliers in their next match three days later, the SuperSonics went on a 5-game losing streak before closing the exhibition tour with a victory against the Phoenix Suns in Vancouver, Canada.

=== Game log ===
2007 pre-season game log
Pre-season: 2–6 (home: 1–2; road: 1–4)

Game	Date	Team	Score	High points	High rebounds	High assists	Location Attendance	Record
1	October 9	@ Sacramento	L 98–104	Damien Wilkins (18)	Nick Collison (9)	Delonte West (6)	ARCO Arena; 13,284	0–1
2	October 12	@ Cleveland	W 96–90	Chris Wilcox (20)	Nick Collison (11)	Earl Watson (6)	Quicken Loans Arena; 15,878	1–1
3	October 13	@ Indiana	L 87–97	Kevin Durant (21)	Mouhamed Sene (15)	Four players (4)	Conseco Fieldhouse; 10,796	1–2
4	October 18	@ L. A. Lakers	L 106–126	Kevin Durant (19)	Robert Swift (8)	Luke Ridnour (8)	Bakersfield, California; 6,016	1–3
5	October 20	Houston	L 94–117	Kevin Durant (25)	Kurt Thomas (12)	Delonte West (7)	KeyArena; 10,854	1–4
6	October 23	Golden State	L 122–126 (OT)	Damien Wilkins (27)	Chris Wilcox (12)	Earl Watson (14)	KeyArena; 9,861	1–5
7	October 24	@ Portland	L 107–109	Nick Collison (17)	Chris Wilcox (7)	Luke Ridnour (8)	Rose Garden; 11,342	1–6
8	October 26	Phoenix	W 109–107	Chris Wilcox (27)	Nick Collison (11)	Delonte West (9)	General Motors Place; 17,704	2–6

2007–08 season schedule

== Roster ==
2007–08 Seattle SuperSonics roster
Players

Pos.	No.	Player	Height	Weight	DOB	From
PF	4	Nick Collison	6 ft 10 in (2.08 m)	255 lb (116 kg)	1980-10-26	Kansas
SF	12	Ronald Dupree	6 ft 7 in (2.01 m)	209 lb (95 kg)	1981-01-26	LSU
SG	35	Kevin Durant	6 ft 9 in (2.06 m)	215 lb (98 kg)	1988-09-29	Texas
C	16	Francisco Elson	7 ft 0 in (2.13 m)	235 lb (107 kg)	1976-02-28	California
SG	15	Mickaël Gelabale	6 ft 7 in (2.01 m)	215 lb (98 kg)	1983-05-22	France
SF	22	Jeff Green	6 ft 9 in (2.06 m)	235 lb (107 kg)	1986-08-28	Georgetown
SF	44	Adrian Griffin	6 ft 5 in (1.96 m)	230 lb (104 kg)	1974-07-04	Seton Hall
PF	42	Donyell Marshall	6 ft 9 in (2.06 m)	245 lb (111 kg)	1973-05-18	Connecticut
C	27	Johan Petro	7 ft 0 in (2.13 m)	247 lb (112 kg)	1986-01-27	France
PG	8	Luke Ridnour	6 ft 2 in (1.88 m)	175 lb (79 kg)	1981-02-13	Oregon
C	18	Mouhamed Sene	6 ft 11 in (2.11 m)	230 lb (104 kg)	1986-05-12	Senegal
C	31	Robert Swift	7 ft 1 in (2.16 m)	245 lb (111 kg)	1985-12-03	Bakersfield HS (CA)
PG	25	Earl Watson	6 ft 1 in (1.85 m)	185 lb (84 kg)	1979-06-12	UCLA
PF	54	Chris Wilcox	6 ft 10 in (2.08 m)	235 lb (107 kg)	1982-09-03	Maryland
SF	21	Damien Wilkins	6 ft 6 in (1.98 m)	225 lb (102 kg)	1980-01-11	Georgia

Coaches
Head coach
- P. J. Carlesimo
Assistant(s)
- Scott Brooks
- Mark Bryant
- Ralph Lewis
- Paul Westhead

Legend
- (DP) Unsigned draft pick
- (FA) Free agent
- (S) Suspended
- (DL) On assignment to D-League affiliate
- Injured

Roster
Updated: April 26, 2008

== Regular season ==
Kevin Durant and Jeff Green's regular season debuts were in doubt, since each player had to deal with sprained ankle injuries during the pre-season. Durant managed to return in time for the season opener on Halloween night, scoring 18 points in a loss against the Denver Nuggets. After their home opener (a loss against the Phoenix Suns), chances for the team to remain in Seattle took a heavy blow, as Sonics' owner Clay Bennett made public his desire to relocate the team to Oklahoma City. The SuperSonics remained on a losing streak that reached 8 games, their worst start in franchise history, and remained the only team in the league without a win before defeating the Miami Heat, followed by a Durant game-winner two days later to get past the Atlanta Hawks. The SuperSonics finished the month of November snapping a 6-game losing streak with their first home victory in a game against the Indiana Pacers, with Durant scoring a career-high 35 points. Before the win against the Pacers, the Sonics were 0–7 at home.

The Sonics registered their best record of the season in December, struggling with injuries to Luke Ridnour, Delonte West and Kurt Thomas adding to the absence of center Robert Swift. Kevin Durant matched again his career-high 35 points in a win against the Milwaukee Bucks, one of their four victories at home that month. After a 2–3 road trip that ended with a loss against the Utah Jazz in which the Sonics were held to one of their lowest scoring outputs in the season, the team returned to the KeyArena to close the year with a 5-game homestand.

After a loss against the Philadelphia 76ers in the last game of 2007, the Sonics went on their longest losing streak of the season, dropping their first 13 games of January in a combined franchise worst 14-game losing streak. During the first games of the month, the team were without the services of their second best scorer Chris Wilcox and point guard Luke Ridnour, who were sidelined with injuries. The Sonics halted the streak by defeating the defending champions San Antonio Spurs and proceeded to win their next two games at home.

After managing to win only 2 of their 16 games in January, the SuperSonics finished February with a 4–8 record and snapped an 8-game losing streak of road games with a victory against the Sacramento Kings, obtaining their first road win since mid-December. Robert Swift returned from his injuries and played his first game since November 11 in a loss against the Chicago Bulls, but would be sidelined for the remainder of the season after two more appearances. The SuperSonics reached the All-Star break with a 13–38 record, 10 games behind their worst record in franchise history at the time. Rookies Kevin Durant and Jeff Green participated in the T-Mobile Rookie Challenge against the second-year players. Near the trade deadline, the Sonics sent Kurt Thomas to the San Antonio Spurs for Brent Barry, Francisco Elson and a 2009 second round draft pick. Barry was waived the next day. The Sonics made one more move before the deadline, that sent Wally Szczerbiak and Delonte West to the Cleveland Cavaliers in a three-team deal with the Chicago Bulls.

The Sonics finished the month of March with their worse record in the regular season, winning only two games, with losing streaks of 11 and 3 games. At this point the Sonics had a 17–57 record and were six games away from their franchise worst 23–59. On March 16, the Denver Nuggets dealt the Sonics their worst loss in franchise history, with a 116–168 score. It was the most points the Nuggets' scored since a January 11, 1984, game against the San Antonio Spurs. Nearing the end of the month, injuries plagued the roster. Mickaël Gelabale tore his ACL during a practice and was out for the remainder of the season. Chris Wilcox re-injured his pinky finger, an injury that ultimately made him miss the remainder of the season, and Nick Collison and Francisco Elson were also sidelined with other injuries.

In April, the Sonics stretched their March losing streak to five games before winning in a double overtime match against the Denver Nuggets. After losing another three straight games, the Sonics played their last home game in Seattle, defeating the Dallas Mavericks 99–95 and closing the regular season with a road victory against the Golden State Warriors. The SuperSonics finished the season with a 20–62 overall record, their worst in franchise history.

=== Standings ===
Northwest Division	W	L	PCT	GB	Home	Road	Div
y-Utah Jazz	54	28	.659	–	37–4	17–24	13–3
x-Denver Nuggets	50	32	.610	4	33–8	17–24	10–6
Portland Trail Blazers	41	41	.500	13	28–13	13–28	10–6
Minnesota Timberwolves	22	60	.268	32	15–26	7–34	3–13
Seattle SuperSonics	20	62	.244	34	13–28	7–34	6–10

#	Western Conference				
#	Team	W	L	PCT	GB
1	c-Los Angeles Lakers	57	25	.695	–
2	y-New Orleans Hornets	56	26	.683	1
3	x-San Antonio Spurs	56	26	.683	1
4	y-Utah Jazz	54	28	.659	3
5	x-Houston Rockets	55	27	.671	2
6	x-Phoenix Suns	55	27	.671	2
7	x-Dallas Mavericks	51	31	.622	6
8	x-Denver Nuggets	50	32	.610	7
9	Golden State Warriors	48	34	.585	9
10	Portland Trail Blazers	41	41	.500	16
11	Sacramento Kings	38	44	.463	19
12	Los Angeles Clippers	23	59	.280	34
13	Minnesota Timberwolves	22	60	.268	35
14	Memphis Grizzlies	22	60	.268	35
15	Seattle SuperSonics	20	62	.244	37

=== Game log ===
2007–08 game log
Total: 20–62 (Home: 13–28; Road: 7–34)
October: 0–1 (home: 0–0; road: 0–1)

Game	Date	Team	Score	High points	High rebounds	High assists	Location Attendance	Record
1	October 31	@ Denver	L 103–120	Damien Wilkins (21)	Nick Collison (11)	Earl Watson (7)	Pepsi Center; 19,380	0–1

November : 3–13 (home: 1–7; road: 2–6)

Game	Date	Team	Score	High points	High rebounds	High assists	Location Attendance	Record
2	November 1	Phoenix	L 99–106	Kevin Durant (27)	Chris Wilcox (11)	Earl Watson (8)	KeyArena; 17,072	0–2
3	November 4	@ L. A. Clippers	L 101–115	Kevin Durant (24)	Nick Collison (10)	Damien Wilkins (6)	Staples Center; 17,376	0–3
4	November 6	@ Sacramento	L 98–104	Wally Szczerbiak (32)	Chris Wilcox (10)	Earl Watson (8)	ARCO Arena; 14,908	0–4
5	November 7	Memphis	L 98–105	Chris Wilcox (21)	Chris Wilcox; Nick Collison (8)	Earl Watson (8)	KeyArena; 10,761	0–5
6	November 9	Utah	L 101–103	Kevin Durant (20)	Nick Collison (12)	Earl Watson (11)	KeyArena; 15,980	0–6
7	November 11	Detroit	L 103–107	Kevin Durant (19)	Chris Wilcox (9)	Luke Ridnour (7)	KeyArena; 16,379	0–7
8	November 13	@ Orlando	L 76–103	Nick Collison (15)	Jeff Green (7)	Delonte West; Earl Watson (4)	Amway Arena; 16,101	0–8
9	November 14	@ Miami	W 104–95	Chris Wilcox (20)	Nick Collison (11)	Delonte West; Earl Watson (6)	American Airlines Arena; 19,600	1–8
10	November 16	@ Atlanta	W 126–123 (2OT)	Damien Wilkins (41)	Nick Collison (14)	Earl Watson (9)	Philips Arena; 13,534	2–8
11	November 17	@ Charlotte	L 84–100	Chris Wilcox (24)	Chris Wilcox (9)	Earl Watson (5)	Charlotte Bobcats Arena; 13,697	2–9
12	November 19	@ Memphis	L 108–125	Delonte West (17)	Jeff Green (14)	Damien Wilkins (6)	FedExForum; 10,863	2–10
13	November 23	New Jersey	L 93–98	Delonte West (17)	Jeff Green (14)	Kurt Thomas; Earl Watson; Nick Collison (3)	KeyArena; 14,424	2–11
14	November 25	San Antonio	L 101–116	Wally Szczerbiak (27)	Kurt Thomas (7)	Delonte West (5)	KeyArena; 14,186	2–12
15	November 27	@ L. A. Lakers	L 99–106	Kevin Durant (25)	Kurt Thomas (13)	Earl Watson (6)	Staples Center; 18,997	2–13
16	November 28	Orlando	L 94–110	Kevin Durant (22)	Kurt Thomas (14)	Kevin Durant; Earl Watson (4)	KeyArena; 12,398	2–14
17	November 30	Indiana	W 95–93	Kevin Durant (35)	Kurt Thomas (18)	Earl Watson (11)	KeyArena; 14,786	3–14

December : 6–8 (home: 4–4; road: 2–4)

Game	Date	Team	Score	High points	High rebounds	High assists	Location Attendance	Record
18	December 2	Golden State	L 96–109	Chris Wilcox; Earl Watson (16)	Chris Wilcox (11)	Earl Watson (5)	KeyArena; 11,461	3–15
19	December 5	L. A. Clippers	W 95–88	Nick Collison (18)	Nick Collison (17)	Earl Watson (6)	KeyArena; 10,961	4–15
20	December 7	Milwaukee	W 104–98	Kevin Durant (35)	Chris Wilcox (13)	Earl Watson (9)	KeyArena; 13,142	5–15
21	December 9	@ New Orleans	L 88–91	Kevin Durant (23)	Nick Collison; Chris Wilcox (12)	Earl Watson (8)	New Orleans Arena; 10,773	5–16
22	December 11	@ Chicago	L 96–123	Kevin Durant (16)	Jeff Green (6)	Earl Watson (6)	United Center; 21,772	5–17
23	December 12	@ New York	W 117–110	Kevin Durant (30)	Kurt Thomas (8)	Kevin Durant; Earl Watson (4)	Madison Square Garden; 17,637	6–17
24	December 14	@ Minnesota	W 99–88	Chris Wilcox (19)	Chris Wilcox (11)	Earl Watson (8)	Target Center; 16,523	7–17
25	December 15	@ Utah	L 75–96	Wally Szczerbiak (24)	Nick Collison (9)	Earl Watson (5)	EnergySolutions Arena; 19,911	7–18
26	December 19	New Orleans	L 93–107	Kevin Durant (18)	Nick Collison (9)	Kevin Durant; Jeff Green (5)	KeyArena; 11,968	7–19
27	December 21	Toronto	W 123–115	Kevin Durant (27)	Nick Collison (10)	Earl Watson (7)	KeyArena; 13,661	8–19
28	December 25	@ Portland	L 79–89	Kevin Durant (23)	Nick Collison (14)	Earl Watson (11)	Rose Garden; 20,527	8–20
29	December 27	Boston	L 96–104	Kevin Durant (25)	Kurt Thomas (14)	Delonte West (8)	KeyArena; 17,072	8–21
30	December 29	Minnesota	W 109–90	Jeff Green; Wally Szczerbiak (18)	Kurt Thomas (15)	Delonte West (7)	KeyArena; 14,038	9–21
31	December 31	Philadelphia	L 90–98	Earl Watson (18)	Kurt Thomas (13)	Earl Watson (7)	KeyArena; 10,595	9–22

January : 2–13 (home: 2–5; road: 0–8)

Game	Date	Team	Score	High points	High rebounds	High assists	Location Attendance	Record
32	January 3	@ Phoenix	L 96–104	Kevin Durant (28)	Nick Collison (15)	Earl Watson (8)	US Airways Center; 18,422	9–23
33	January 6	@ Washington	L 86–108	Kevin Durant (19)	Nick Collison (17)	Kurt Thomas; Delonte West (4)	Verizon Center; 17,816	9–24
34	January 8	@ Cleveland	L 79–95	Kevin Durant (24)	Nick Collison (14)	Earl Watson (6)	Quicken Loans Arena; 20,409	9–25
35	January 9	@ New Jersey	L 88–99	Johan Petro (22)	Nick Collison (13)	Delonte West (5)	Izod Center; 14,101	9–26
36	January 11	Dallas	L 70–90	Wally Szczerbiak (17)	Kurt Thomas (15)	Kevin Durant (6)	KeyArena; 12,522	9–27
37	January 14	L. A. Lakers	L 121–123 (OT)	Nick Collison (24)	Nick Collison (18)	Luke Ridnour (11)	KeyArena; 13,452	9–28
38	January 16	@ New Orleans	L 92–123	Kevin Durant (20)	Kevin Durant; Johan Petro (7)	Earl Watson (11)	New Orleans Arena; 9,882	9–29
39	January 18	@ Memphis	L 100–124	Kevin Durant (22)	Kurt Thomas (8)	Earl Watson (8)	FedExForum; 13,451	9–30
40	January 19	@ Dallas	L 96–111	Wally Szczerbiak (26)	Nick Collison (12)	Earl Watson (6)	American Airlines Center; 20,386	9–31
41	January 21	@ Houston	L 89–96	Jeff Green; Wally Szczerbiak (15)	Kurt Thomas (11)	Earl Watson (9)	Toyota Center; 15,264	9–32
42	January 23	Houston	L 107–109	Kevin Durant (25)	Nick Collison (14)	Luke Ridnour (8)	KeyArena; 12,342	9–33
43	January 25	Atlanta	L 90–99	Chris Wilcox (18)	Chris Wilcox (7)	Luke Ridnour (4)	KeyArena; 13,647	9–34
44	January 27	Sacramento	L 101–103	Kevin Durant (19)	Kurt Thomas (10)	Earl Watson (8)	KeyArena; 13,409	9–35
45	January 29	San Antonio	W 88–85	Kevin Durant (26)	Nick Collison; Chris Wilcox (10)	Kevin Durant; Luke Ridnour (5)	KeyArena; 13,295	10–35
46	January 31	Cleveland	W 101–95	Kevin Durant (24)	Chris Wilcox (13)	Earl Watson (12)	KeyArena; 13,109	11–35

February : 4–8 (home: 3–5; road: 1–3)

Game	Date	Team	Score	High points	High rebounds	High assists	Location Attendance	Record
47	February 2	New York	W 86–85	Kevin Durant (21)	Nick Collison (12)	Earl Watson (8)	KeyArena; 12,783	12–35
48	February 4	Chicago	L 108–118	Wally Szczerbiak (21)	Nick Collison (9)	Earl Watson (8)	KeyArena; 10,935	12–36
49	February 6	@ Sacramento	W 105–92	Earl Watson (23)	Earl Watson; Chris Wilcox (10)	Earl Watson (10)	ARCO Arena; 13,136	13–36
50	February 8	@ Phoenix	L 99–103	Chris Wilcox (22)	Chris Wilcox (15)	Earl Watson (5)	US Airways Center; 18,422	13–37
51	February 13	Utah	L 93–112	Kevin Durant (19)	Kurt Thomas (13)	Earl Watson (14)	KeyArena; 10,618	13–38
52	February 19	Memphis	W 108–101	Earl Watson (26)	Nick Collison; Jeff Green (9)	Earl Watson (9)	KeyArena; 11,391	14–38
53	February 21	@ Portland	L 88–92	Kevin Durant (20)	Nick Collison (14)	Earl Watson (9)	Rose Garden; 20,168	14–39
54	February 22	Portland	W 99–87	Kevin Durant (17)	Jeff Green (9)	Earl Watson (4)	KeyArena; 16,640	15–39
55	February 24	L. A. Lakers	L 91–111	Mickaël Gelabale (21)	Johan Petro (10)	Earl Watson (8)	KeyArena; 17,072	15–40
56	February 26	@ Golden State	L 99–105	Kevin Durant; Jeff Green (21)	Nick Collison (13)	Luke Ridnour (15)	Oracle Arena; 19,412	15–41
57	February 27	Denver	L 96–138	Kevin Durant; Mickaël Gelabale (16)	Johan Petro (8)	Mickaël Gelabale (6)	KeyArena; 13,627	15–42
58	February 29	Miami	L 93–103	Chris Wilcox (30)	Nick Collison; Jeff Green (11)	Luke Ridnour (5)	KeyArena; 12,542	15–43

March : 2–14 (home: 1–5; road: 1–9)

Game	Date	Team	Score	High points	High rebounds	High assists	Location Attendance	Record
59	March 2	@ Minnesota	W 111–108 (OT)	Kevin Durant (25)	Chris Wilcox (15)	Earl Watson (9)	Target Center; 11,508	16–43
60	March 4	@ Detroit	L 97–100	Earl Watson (23)	Johan Petro; Chris Wilcox (10)	Earl Watson (7)	The Palace of Auburn Hills; 22,076	16–44
61	March 5	@ Milwaukee	L 106–118	Kevin Durant (23)	Johan Petro (15)	Earl Watson (8)	Bradley Center; 15,010	16–45
62	March 7	@ Philadelphia	L 83–117	Chris Wilcox (20)	Nick Collison; Johan Petro (5)	Earl Watson (5)	Wachovia Center; 17,762	16–46
63	March 9	@ Toronto	L 106–114	Chris Wilcox (28)	Chris Wilcox (10)	Luke Ridnour (9)	KeyArena; 19,800	16–47
64	March 11	@ Indiana	L 107–114	Kevin Durant (27)	Nick Collison (8)	Luke Ridnour (8)	Conseco Fieldhouse; 11,216	16–48
65	March 12	@ Boston	L 82–111	Kevin Durant (16)	Johan Petro (10)	Earl Watson (7)	TD Banknorth Garden; 18,624	16–49
66	March 14	Minnesota	L 116–121	Kevin Durant (24)	Nick Collison (8)	Earl Watson (10)	KeyArena; 14,035	16–50
67	March 16	@ Denver	L 116–168	Kevin Durant (23)	Chris Wilcox (12)	Earl Watson (7)	Pepsi Center; 19,155	16–51
68	March 19	Phoenix	L 105–130	Jeff Green (19)	Nick Collison (12)	Four players (3)	KeyArena; 17,072	16–52
69	March 21	@ L. A. Lakers	L 101–115	Kevin Durant; Earl Watson (20)	Johan Petro (11)	Earl Watson (7)	Staples Center; 18,997	16–53
70	March 22	@ Utah	W 97–84	Kevin Durant; Jeff Green (23)	Nick Collison (13)	Earl Watson (5)	EnergySolutions Arena; 19,911	16–54
71	March 24	Portland	W 104–99	Kevin Durant (23)	Nick Collison (11)	Luke Ridnour (9)	KeyArena; 11,292	17–54
72	March 26	Washington	L 99–104	Kevin Durant (32)	Nick Collison (21)	Earl Watson (6)	KeyArena; 10,497	17–55
73	March 28	Charlotte	L 93–96	Kevin Durant (18)	Nick Collison (10)	Earl Watson (6)	KeyArena; 13,592	17–56
74	March 30	Sacramento	L 107–120	Kevin Durant (25)	Nick Collison (8)	Earl Watson (12)	KeyArena; 10,862	17–57

April : 3–5 (home: 2–2; road: 1–3)

Game	Date	Team	Score	High points	High rebounds	High assists	Location Attendance	Record
75	April 2	L. A. Clippers	L 84–102	Kevin Durant (30)	Nick Collison (17)	Luke Ridnour (6)	KeyArena; 10,392	17–58
76	April 4	Houston	L 66–79	Nick Collison (15)	Johan Petro (15)	Three players (4)	KeyArena; 14,170	17–59
77	April 6	Denver	W 151–147 (2OT)	Kevin Durant (37)	Nick Collison (14)	Earl Watson (11)	KeyArena; 13,104	18–59
78	April 8	@ Dallas	L 83–99	Earl Watson (22)	Jeff Green (8)	Earl Watson (8)	American Airlines Center; 20,228	18–60
79	April 9	@ Houston	L 80–103	Kevin Durant (26)	Nick Collison (15)	Earl Watson (8)	Toyota Center; 18,370	18–61
80	April 11	@ San Antonio	L 74–95	Kevin Durant (20)	Nick Collison (14)	Luke Ridnour (4)	AT&T Center; 18,797	18–62
81	April 13	Dallas	W 99–95	Earl Watson (21)	Nick Collison (11)	Earl Watson (10)	KeyArena; 16,272	19–62
82	April 16	@ Golden State	W 126–121	Kevin Durant (42)	Nick Collison; Kevin Durant (13)	Earl Watson (12)	Oracle Arena; 19,596	20–62

2007–08 season schedule

== Relocation to Oklahoma City ==
On September 21, 2007, majority owner Clay Bennett applied for arbitration by a federal judge on the issue of whether the team could break its lease on the KeyArena in 2008. Bennett initially set a deadline for October 31, 2007, for the City of Seattle to reach an agreement regarding a new facility, and two days past that date Bennett informed the NBA commissioner David Stern of his intentions to relocate the team to Oklahoma City. Seattle had filed a lawsuit on September 23, 2007, in an attempt to keep the Sonics from leaving before the end of their lease in 2010.

Microsoft CEO Steve Ballmer made a new offer on a KeyArena expansion on March. Ballmer proposed to pay half of the US$300 million required for the expansion and set an April 10, 2008, deadline for the City of Seattle to accept the offer. After the deal fell through, all hopes rested on the lawsuit set for June 2008.

On April 13, 2008, the SuperSonics played their last game in Seattle, defeating the Dallas Mavericks by a score of 95-99. Heartbroken fans chanted "Save our Sonics" as the game ended. On April 18, the NBA Board of Governors approved the team's relocation to Oklahoma City by a 28–2 vote. Mark Cuban, owner of the Dallas Mavericks and Paul Allen of the Portland Trail Blazers were the only ones against the move. On July 2, 2008, the City of Seattle and the Sonics' ownership reached a settlement that allowed the franchise to move to Oklahoma City. According to the settlement, Bennett and his group would pay $45 million immediately to the City to break the KeyArena lease, then an additional $30 million if Seattle failed to get a new team within five years. In addition, items associated with the SuperSonics' history in Seattle, including trophies, banners, and retired jerseys, stayed in the city and were placed in the Museum of History and Industry.

== Player statistics ==
Legend
GP	Games played	GS	Games started	MPG	Minutes per game
FG%	Field-goal percentage	3P%	3-point field-goal percentage	FT%	Free-throw percentage
RPG	Rebounds per game	APG	Assists per game	SPG	Steals per game
BPG	Blocks per game	PPG	Points per game

Player	GP	GS	MPG	FG%	3P%	FT%	RPG	APG	SPG	BPG	PPG
Nick Collison	78	35	28.5	.502	.000	.737	9.4	1.4	.6	0.8	9.8
Ronald Dupree ^{[1]}	4	0	4.5	.333		1.000	2.0	.3	.3	.0	1.0
Kevin Durant	80	80	34.6	.430	.288	.873	4.4	2.4	1.0	.9	20.3
Francisco Elson ^{[1]}	22	2	12.7	.341	.000	.462	3.0	.4	.3	.3	3.0
Mickael Gelabale	39	0	11.9	.439	.432	.778	1.5	.8	.3	.2	4.3
Eddie Gill ^{[1]}	1	0	5.0	.000	.000		.0	1.0	.0	.0	.0
Jeff Green	80	52	28.2	.427	.276	.744	4.7	1.5	.6	.6	10.5
Adrian Griffin ^{[1]}	13	0	6.5	.375		1.000	1.7	.4	.4	.1	1.1
Donyell Marshall ^{[1]}	15	0	12.3	.352	.233	.923	3.1	.3	.3	.5	3.8
Ira Newble ^{[1]}	2	0	8.5	.286	.000		.0	.5	.0	.0	2.0
Johan Petro	72	28	18.2	.419	.000	.736	5.1	.4	.5	.6	6.0
Luke Ridnour	61	5	20.0	.399	.296	.857	1.5	4.0	.6	.2	6.4
Mouhamed Sene	13	0	4.8	.458		.471	1.2	.1	.0	.5	2.3
Robert Swift	8	4	12.3	.353		1.000	2.3	.1	.6	.8	1.8
Wally Szczerbiak ^{[1]}	50	1	23.6	.460	.428	.843	2.7	1.4	.3	.1	13.1
Kurt Thomas ^{[1]}	42	39	25.2	.513		.696	8.8	1.3	.8	1.0	7.5
Earl Watson	78	73	29.1	.454	.371	.766	2.9	6.8	.9	.1	10.7
Delonte West ^{[1]}	35	5	20.8	.388	.339	.667	2.7	3.2	.9	.3	6.8
Chris Wilcox	62	55	28.0	.524	.000	.645	7.0	1.2	.7	.6	13.4
Damien Wilkins	76	31	24.3	.403	.323	.736	3.2	2.0	.8	.3	9.2
Mike Wilks ^{[1]}	3	0	7.3	.556	.000	1.000	.3	1.7	.3	.0	4.0

- ^{1} Statistics with the Seattle SuperSonics.

== Awards ==
- Kevin Durant won the Western Conference Rookie of the Month Award for every month with the exception of February. At the end of the season, Durant was named Rookie of the Year and was selected to the NBA All-Rookie First Team along Jeff Green.

== Injuries ==
- Robert Swift missed the majority of the season after tearing his ACL the previous season. After playing in only 8 games, Swift underwent knee surgery on March to repair a torn lateral meniscus and was out for the remainder of the season.
- Mickaël Gelabale tore his ACL during a team practice on March and was sidelined for the rest of the season.

== Transactions ==
=== Overview ===
Players Added

Via draft

- Kevin Durant
- Jeff Green

Via trade

- Brent Barry ^{[b]}
- Francisco Elson
- Adrian Griffin
- Donyell Marshall
- Ira Newble ^{[b]}
- Wally Szczerbiak ^{[a]}
- Kurt Thomas ^{[c]}
- Delonte West ^{[a]}

Via free agency

- Ronald Dupree ^{[d]}
- Eddie Gill (10-day contract)
- Mike Wilks (10-day contract)
Players Lost

Via trade

- Rashard Lewis

- ^{a} Sent during the regular season to the Cleveland Cavaliers as part of a 3-team trade that also involved the Chicago Bulls.
- ^{b} Later waived.
- ^{c} Thomas was later traded to the San Antonio Spurs.
- ^{d} Signed for the rest of the season after a 10-day contract.

=== Trades ===
June 28, 2007	To Seattle SuperSonics Jeff Green; Wally Szczerbiak; Delonte West	To Boston Celtics Ray Allen; Glen Davis
July 11, 2007 (Sign and trade)	To Seattle SuperSonics 2009 second round pick	To Orlando Magic Rashard Lewis
July 20, 2007	To Seattle SuperSonics Kurt Thomas; 2008 and 2010 first round selections	To Phoenix Suns 2009 second round selection
February 21, 2008	To Seattle SuperSonics Adrian Griffin (from Chicago); Donyell Marshall (from Cleveland); Ira Newble (from Cleveland)	To Cleveland Cavaliers Wally Szczerbiak; Delonte West

== See also ==
- 2007–08 NBA season
