= 2007–08 Golden State Warriors season =

NBA professional basketball team season

- Head coach: Don Nelson
- General manager: Chris Mullin
- Owner: Chris Cohan
- Arena: The Oracle

Results
- Record: 48–34 (.585)
- Place: Division: 3rd (Pacific); Conference: 9th (Western)
- Playoff finish: Did not qualify
- Stats at Basketball Reference

The 2007–08 Golden State Warriors season was their 62nd season in the NBA and their 35th in Oakland. The Warriors had the fifth best team offensive rating in the NBA.

Key dates prior to the start of the season:

- On June 28, the 2007 NBA draft took place in New York City.
- From July 1 to July 10, the free agency period took place.
- On October 9, the Warriors' pre-season started with a game against the Los Angeles Lakers in Honolulu, Hawaii.
- On October 30, the Warriors' season started with a home loss against the Utah Jazz.

Despite finishing the season with a 48–34 record, six more wins than the previous season, the Warriors failed to qualify for the playoffs, as all eight seed teams in the Western conference finished with a 50+ winning record. The Warriors has the second highest winning percentage (.585) of any team who failed to make the playoffs behind the 1971–72 Phoenix Suns. This had fans severely criticizing the conference system in the league as the Warriors had a better record than all eastern conference playoff teams up to the third seed. Teams such as the Atlanta Hawks had sub or .500 winning percentages but still managed to make the postseason.

== Draft ==
Round	Pick	Player	Position	Nationality	School / club team
1	18	Marco Belinelli	SG	Italy	(Italy) Fortitudo Bologna
2	36	Jermareo Davidson	PF	United States	Alabama
2	46	Stephane Lasme	PF	Gabon	Massachusetts

== Roster ==
2007–08 Golden State Warriors roster
Players

Pos.	No.	Player	Height	Weight	DOB	From
G/F	7	Kelenna Azubuike	6 ft 5 in (1.96 m)	220 lb (100 kg)	1983–12–16	Kentucky
F	22	Matt Barnes	6 ft 7 in (2.01 m)	225 lb (102 kg)	1980–03–09	UCLA
G	18	Marco Belinelli	6 ft 5 in (1.96 m)	200 lb (91 kg)	1986–03–25	Italy
C	15	Andris Biedriņš	6 ft 11 in (2.11 m)	245 lb (111 kg)	1986–04–02	Latvia
F	44	Austin Croshere	6 ft 10 in (2.08 m)	235 lb (107 kg)	1975–05–01	Providence
G	5	Baron Davis	6 ft 3 in (1.91 m)	215 lb (98 kg)	1979–04–13	UCLA
G	8	Monta Ellis	6 ft 3 in (1.91 m)	177 lb (80 kg)	1985–10–26	LHS (MS)
F/C	3	Al Harrington	6 ft 9 in (2.06 m)	245 lb (111 kg)	1980–02–17	SPHS (NJ)
F	1	Stephen Jackson	6 ft 8 in (2.03 m)	218 lb (99 kg)	1978–04–05	Oak Hill Academy (VA)
C	26	Patrick O'Bryant (DL)	7 ft 0 in (2.13 m)	250 lb (113 kg)	1986–06–20	Bradley
C	19	Kosta Perović (DL)	7 ft 2 in (2.18 m)	240 lb (109 kg)	1985–02–19	Serbia
G/F	2	Mickaël Piétrus	6 ft 6 in (1.98 m)	215 lb (98 kg)	1982–02–07	France
G	23	C. J. Watson	6 ft 2 in (1.88 m)	176 lb (80 kg)	1984–04–17	Tennessee
F	32	Brandan Wright	6 ft 10 in (2.08 m)	210 lb (95 kg)	1987–10–05	North Carolina

Coaches
Head coach
- Don Nelson
Assistant(s)
- Sidney Moncrief
- Larry Riley
- Travis Schlenk
- Stephen Silas
- Keith Smart
- Russell Turner

Legend
- (DP) Unsigned draft pick
- (FA) Free agent
- (S) Suspended
- (DL) On assignment to D-League affiliate
- (L) On leave from the team
- Injured

Roster
Updated: April 8, 2008

=== Standings ===
Pacific Division	W	L	PCT	GB	Home	Road	Div
c-Los Angeles Lakers	57	25	.695	–	30–11	27–14	12–4
x-Phoenix Suns	55	27	.671	2	30–11	25–16	10–6
Golden State Warriors	48	34	.585	9	27–14	21–20	10–6
Sacramento Kings	38	44	.463	19	26–15	12–29	3–13
Los Angeles Clippers	23	59	.284	34	13–28	10–31	5–11

#	Western Conference				
#	Team	W	L	PCT	GB
1	c-Los Angeles Lakers	57	25	.695	–
2	y-New Orleans Hornets	56	26	.683	1
3	x-San Antonio Spurs	56	26	.683	1
4	y-Utah Jazz	54	28	.659	3
5	x-Houston Rockets	55	27	.671	2
6	x-Phoenix Suns	55	27	.671	2
7	x-Dallas Mavericks	51	31	.622	6
8	x-Denver Nuggets	50	32	.610	7
9	Golden State Warriors	48	34	.585	9
10	Portland Trail Blazers	41	41	.500	16
11	Sacramento Kings	38	44	.463	19
12	Los Angeles Clippers	23	59	.280	34
13	Minnesota Timberwolves	22	60	.268	35
14	Memphis Grizzlies	22	60	.268	35
15	Seattle SuperSonics	20	62	.244	37

=== Game log ===
- Green background indicates win.
- Red background indicates regulation loss.

==== October ====
Record: 0–1; Home: 0–1; Road: 0–0

#	Date	Visitor	Score	Home	OT	Leading scorer	Attendance	Record
1	10/30	Utah Jazz	117–96	Golden State Warriors	NA	Baron Davis	19,832	0–1

==== November ====
Record: 8–6; Home: 3–3; Road: 5–3

#	Date	Visitor	Score	Home	OT	Leading scorer	Attendance	Record
2	11/2	Golden State Warriors	120–114	Los Angeles Clippers	NA	Kelenna Azubuike	19,060	0–2
3	11/3	Golden State Warriors	113–110	Utah Jazz	NA	Al Harrington	19,911	0–3
4	11/6	Cleveland Cavaliers	108–104	Golden State Warriors	NA	Baron Davis	19,596	0–4
5	11/8	Dallas Mavericks	120–115	Golden State Warriors	NA	Baron Davis	19,596	0–5
6	11/14	Detroit Pistons	111–104	Golden State Warriors	NA	Baron Davis	18,923	0–6
7	11/16	Los Angeles Clippers	122–105	Golden State Warriors	NA	Al Harrington	19,596	1–6
8	11/18	Golden State Warriors	106–100	Toronto Raptors	NA	Stephen Jackson	19,800	2–6
9	11/20	Golden State Warriors	108–82	New York Knicks	NA	Baron Davis	19,763	3–6
10	11/21	Golden State Warriors	82–105	Boston Celtics	NA	Monta Ellis	18,624	3–7
11	11/23	Golden State Warriors	123–115	Washington Wizards	NA	Baron Davis	20,173	4–7
12	11/24	Golden State Warriors	100–98	Philadelphia 76ers	1	Monta Ellis	13,047	5–7
13	11/26	Phoenix Suns	114–129	Golden State Warriors	NA	Stephen Jackson	19,596	6–7
14	11/28	Golden State Warriors	103–96	Sacramento Kings	NA	Monta Ellis	13,652	7–7
15	11/29	Houston Rockets	94–113	Golden State Warriors	NA	Baron Davis	19,596	8–7

==== December ====
Record: 11–6; Home: 5–2; Road: 6–4

#	Date	Visitor	Score	Home	OT	Leading scorer	Attendance	Record
16	12/2	Golden State Warriors	109–96	Seattle SuperSonics	NA	Stephen Jackson & Al Harrington	11,461	9–7
17	12/3	Orlando Magic	123–117	Golden State Warriors	1	Stephen Jackson	18,527	9–8
18	12/5	Milwaukee Bucks	120–90	Golden State Warriors	NA	Stephen Jackson & Baron Davis	17,823	10–8
19	12/7	Miami Heat	113–120	Golden State Warriors	NA	Stephen Jackson	19,596	11–8
20	12/9	Golden State Warriors	113–123	Los Angeles Lakers	NA	Baron Davis	18,997	11–9
21	12/11	San Antonio Spurs	84–96	Golden State Warriors	NA	Stephen Jackson	19,827	12–9
22	12/12	Golden State Warriors	95–105	Portland Trail Blazers	NA	Baron Davis	15,943	12–10
23	12/14	Los Angeles Lakers	106–108	Golden State Warriors	NA	Al Harrington & Baron Davis	20,705	13–10
24	12/16	Golden State Warriors	87–109	Detroit Pistons	NA	Matt Barnes	22,076	13–11
25	12/17	Golden State Warriors	125–117	Memphis Grizzlies	NA	Stephen Jackson	10,549	14–11
26	12/19	Golden State Warriors	111–98	Minnesota Timberwolves	NA	Al Harrington	13,001	15–11
27	12/22	Golden State Warriors	95–100	New Jersey Nets	NA	Stephen Jackson	15,032	15–12
28	12/23	Golden State Warriors	105–96	Cleveland Cavaliers	NA	Stephen Jackson	20,562	16–12
29	12/26	Minnesota Timberwolves	101–105	Golden State Warriors	NA	Monta Ellis	19,596	17–12
30	12/28	Denver Nuggets	124–120	Golden State Warriors	NA	Stephen Jackson	20,001	17–13
31	12/30	Golden State Warriors	105–95	Denver Nuggets	NA	Baron Davis	19,362	18–13
32	12/31	Golden State Warriors	112–95	Houston Rockets	NA	Baron Davis	18,153	19–13

==== January ====
Record: 9–6; Home: 5–2; Road: 4–4

#	Date	Visitor	Score	Home	OT	Leading scorer	Attendance	Record
33	1/2	Golden State Warriors	99–121	Dallas Mavericks	NA	Stephen Jackson	20,172	19–14
34	1/4	New Orleans Hornets	116–104	Golden State Warriors	NA	Baron Davis	19,596	19–15
35	1/7	San Antonio Spurs	130–121	Golden State Warriors	1	Baron Davis	19,107	20–15
36	1/9	Golden State Warriors	91–109	Portland Trail Blazers	NA	Matt Barnes	20,415	20–16
37	1/11	Memphis Grizzlies	104–116	Golden State Warriors	NA	Monta Ellis	19,224	21–16
38	1/13	Indiana Pacers	101–106	Golden State Warriors	NA	Monta Ellis	19,044	22–16
39	1/15	Golden State Warriors	105–98	Minnesota Timberwolves	NA	Baron Davis	10,777	23–16
40	1/16	Golden State Warriors	117–125	Indiana Pacers	NA	Baron Davis	11,501	23–17
41	1/18	Golden State Warriors	119–111	Chicago Bulls	NA	Baron Davis	21,896	24–17
42	1/19	Golden State Warriors	119–99	Milwaukee Bucks	NA	Al Harrington	16,615	25–17
43	1/21	Minnesota Timberwolves	109–108	Golden State Warriors	NA	Monta Ellis	19,144	25–18
44	1/24	New Jersey Nets	119–121	Golden State Warriors	NA	Monta Ellis	19,596	26–18
45	1/27	New York Knicks	104–106	Golden State Warriors	NA	Stephen Jackson	19,596	27–18
46	1/29	Golden State Warriors	107–111	Houston Rockets	NA	Stephen Jackson	16,586	27–19
47	1/30	Golden State Warriors	116–103	New Orleans Hornets	NA	Stephen Jackson	14,410	28–19

==== February ====
Record: 7–3; Home: 7–2; Road: 0–1

#	Date	Visitor	Score	Home	OT	Leading scorer	Attendance	Record
48	2/1	Charlotte Bobcats	94–127	Golden State Warriors	NA	Monta Ellis	20,064	29–19
49	2/7	Chicago Bulls	114–108	Golden State Warriors	NA	Monta Ellis	19,596	29–20
50	2/9	Sacramento Kings	102–105	Golden State Warriors	NA	Monta Ellis	20,018	30–20
51	2/11	Washington Wizards	117–120	Golden State Warriors	NA	Stephen Jackson	19,043	31–20
52	2/13	Phoenix Suns	118–120	Golden State Warriors	NA	Monta Ellis	19,754	32–20
53	2/19	Golden State Warriors	109–119	Utah Jazz	NA	Al Harrington	19,911	32–21
54	2/20	Boston Celtics	117–119	Golden State Warriors	NA	Baron Davis	20,711	33–21
55	2/22	Atlanta Hawks	117–110	Golden State Warriors	NA	Baron Davis	19,596	33–22
56	2/26	Seattle SuperSonics	99–105	Golden State Warriors	NA	Monta Ellis	19,412	34–22
57	2/29	Philadelphia 76ers	97–119	Golden State Warriors	NA	Mickaël Piétrus	19,602	35–22

==== March ====
Record: 10–6; Home: 5–2; Road: 5–4

#	Date	Visitor	Score	Home	OT	Leading scorer	Attendance	Record
58	3/2	Portland Trail Blazers	104–110	Golden State Warriors	NA	Stephen Jackson	19,596	36–22
59	3/4	Golden State Warriors	135–118	Atlanta Hawks	NA	Baron Davis	16,575	37–22
60	3/5	Golden State Warriors	109–118	Charlotte Bobcats	NA	Monta Ellis	13,747	37–23
61	3/7	Golden State Warriors	134–99	Miami Heat	NA	Stephen Jackson	19,161	38–23
62	3/8	Golden State Warriors	104–95	Orlando Magic	NA	Baron Davis	17,519	39–23
63	3/12	Toronto Raptors	106–117	Golden State Warriors	NA	Monta Ellis	19,596	40–23
64	3/13	Golden State Warriors	115–123	Phoenix Suns	NA	Baron Davis	18,422	40–24
65	3/15	Memphis Grizzlies	107–110	Golden State Warriors	NA	Stephen Jackson	19,596	41–24
66	3/18	Golden State Warriors	105–122	Sacramento Kings	NA	Baron Davis	16,245	41–25
67	3/19	Golden State Warriors	116–100	Los Angeles Clippers	NA	Stephen Jackson	18,704	42–25
68	3/21	Houston Rockets	109–106	Golden State Warriors	NA	Baron Davis	19,824	42–26
69	3/23	Golden State Warriors	115–111	Los Angeles Lakers	NA	Stephen Jackson & Monta Ellis	18,997	43–26
70	3/24	Los Angeles Lakers	123–119	Golden State Warriors	1	Baron Davis	20,713	43–27
71	3/27	Portland Trail Blazers	95–111	Golden State Warriors	NA	Stephen Jackson	19,732	44–27
72	3/29	Golden State Warriors	112–119	Denver Nuggets	NA	Baron Davis	19,844	44–28
73	3/30	Dallas Mavericks	104–114	Golden State Warriors	NA	Monta Ellis	19,852	45–28

==== April ====
Record: 3–6; Home: 2–2; Road: 1–4

#	Date	Visitor	Score	Home	OT	Leading scorer	Attendance	Record
74	4/01	Golden State Warriors	92–116	Spurs	NA	Baron Davis (19)	18,797	45–29
75	4/02	Golden State Warriors	86–111	Mavericks	NA	Monta Ellis (27)	20,331	45–30
76	4/04	Golden State Warriors	117–86	Grizzlies	NA	Andris Biedrins (21)	11,463	46–30
77	4/06	Golden State Warriors	96–108	Hornets	NA	Monta Ellis (35)	17,809	46–31
78	4/08	Kings	132–140	Golden State Warriors	NA	Baron Davis (33)	20,003	47–31
79	4/10	Nuggets	114–105	Golden State Warriors	NA	Monta Ellis (29)	20,737	47–32
80	4/12	Clippers	116–122	Golden State Warriors	NA	Stephen Jackson (28)	19,706	48–32
81	4/14	Golden State Warriors	116–122	Suns	NA	Stephen Jackson (23)	18,422	48–33
82	4/16	SuperSonics	126–121	Golden State Warriors	NA	Monta Ellis (24)	19,596	48–34

== Player stats ==
Legend
GP	Games played	GS	Games started	MPG	Minutes per game
FG%	Field-goal percentage	3P%	3-point field-goal percentage	FT%	Free-throw percentage
RPG	Rebounds per game	APG	Assists per game	SPG	Steals per game
BPG	Blocks per game	PPG	Points per game

=== Regular season ===
Player	GP	GS	MPG	FG%	3P%	FT%	RPG	APG	SPG	BPG	PPG
Kelenna Azubuike	81	17	21.4	.445	.364	.717	4.0	.9	.56	.42	8.5
Matt Barnes	73	18	19.4	.423	.293	.747	4.4	1.9	.66	.49	6.7
Marco Belinelli	33	0	7.3	.387	.390	.778	.4	.5	.15	.00	2.9
Andris Biedriņš	76	59	27.3	.626	.000	.620	9.8	1.0	.74	1.24	10.5
Austin Croshere	44	0	10.4	.445	.361	.906	2.4	.7	.18	.14	3.9
Baron Davis	82	82	39.0	.426	.330	.750	4.7	7.6	2.33	.52	21.8
Monta Ellis	81	72	37.9	.531	.231	.767	5.0	3.9	1.53	.33	20.2
Al Harrington	81	59	27.0	.434	.375	.774	5.4	1.6	.91	.20	13.6
Troy Hudson	9	0	10.3	.290	.333	1.000	.8	1.0	.33	.00	3.1
Stephen Jackson	73	73	39.1	.405	.363	.832	4.4	4.1	1.26	.40	20.1
Patrick O'Bryant	24	0	4.1	.552	.000	.600	1.2	.2	.17	.38	1.5
Kosta Perović	7	0	5.4	.300	.000	.667	1.9	.1	.00	.29	1.4
Mickaël Piétrus	66	16	19.9	.439	.361	.673	3.7	.7	1.00	.65	7.2
C. J. Watson	32	0	11.5	.426	.346	.793	1.0	1.1	.47	.00	3.7
Chris Webber	9	8	14.0	.484	.000	.417	3.6	2.0	.44	.67	3.9
Brandan Wright	38	6	9.9	.554	.000	.675	2.6	.2	.16	.58	4.0

== Transactions ==
=== Trades ===
June 28, 2007	To Golden State Warriors Draft rights to Brandan Wright	To Charlotte Bobcats Draft rights to Jermareo Davidson; Jason Richardson

=== Free agency ===
==== Re-signed ====
Player	Signed
Kelenna Azubuike	1-year contract
Matt Barnes	1-year contract worth $3 million
Mickaël Piétrus	1-year contract worth $3.5 million

==== Additions ====
Player	Signed	Former team
Austin Croshere		Dallas Mavericks
Troy Hudson		Minnesota Timberwolves
D. J. Mbenga		Dallas Mavericks
Chris Webber		Detroit Pistons

==== Subtractions ====
Player	Reason left	New team
Josh Powell		Los Angeles Clippers
Adonal Foyle	1-year contract worth $1.3 million	Orlando Magic
Šarūnas Jasikevičius		Panathinaikos B.C.
Stéphane Lasme	Waived	Los Angeles D-Fenders
D. J. Mbenga	Waived	Los Angeles Lakers

== Awards ==
Recipient	Award	Week
Stephen Jackson	Western Conference Player of the Week	Nov. 26 – Dec. 2
Baron Davis	Western Conference Player of the Week	Jan. 14 – Jan. 20
