= 2007–08 Utah Jazz season =

NBA professional basketball team season

- Division champions
- Head coach: Jerry Sloan
- General manager: Kevin O'Connor
- Owner: Larry H. Miller
- Arena: EnergySolutions Arena

Results
- Record: 54–28 (.659)
- Place: Division: 1st (Northwest); Conference: 4th (Western)
- Playoff finish: Conference Semifinals (lost to Lakers 2–4)
- Stats at Basketball Reference

Local media
- Television: FSN Utah; KJZZ
- Radio: KFNZ; KBEE

The 2007–08 Utah Jazz season was their 34th season in the NBA and 28th in Salt Lake City. The Jazz had the best team offensive rating in the NBA.

The Jazz continued to play consistent all season, finishing with a 54–28 record. They defeated the Houston Rockets in the opening round, but were ousted by the Los Angeles Lakers in the next round.

Key dates prior to the start of the season:

- The 2007 NBA draft took place in New York City on June 28.
- The free agency period begins in July.

== Draft picks ==
Utah's selections from the 2007 NBA draft in New York City.

Round	Pick	Player	Position	Nationality	College
1	25	Morris Almond	Shooting guard/Small forward	United States	Rice
2	55	Herbert Hill	Power forward/center	United States	Providence

== Roster ==
2007–08 Utah Jazz roster
Players

Pos.	No.	Player	Height	Weight	DOB	From
SG	22	Morris Almond	6 ft 6 in (1.98 m)	215 lb (98 kg)	1985-02-02	Rice
PF	5	Carlos Boozer	6 ft 9 in (2.06 m)	266 lb (121 kg)	1981-11-20	Duke
SG	9	Ronnie Brewer	6 ft 7 in (2.01 m)	218 lb (99 kg)	1985-03-20	Arkansas
C	31	Jarron Collins	6 ft 11 in (2.11 m)	248 lb (112 kg)	1978-12-02	Stanford
C	44	Kyrylo Fesenko	7 ft 0 in (2.13 m)	235 lb (107 kg)	1986-12-24	Ukraine
SF	15	Matt Harpring	6 ft 7 in (2.01 m)	235 lb (107 kg)	1976-05-31	Georgia Tech
PG	3	Jason Hart	6 ft 3 in (1.91 m)	185 lb (84 kg)	1978-04-29	Syracuse
SF	47	Andrei Kirilenko	6 ft 9 in (2.06 m)	227 lb (103 kg)	1981-02-18	Russia
SG	26	Kyle Korver	6 ft 6 in (1.98 m)	211 lb (96 kg)	1981-03-17	Creighton
SG	34	C. J. Miles	6 ft 6 in (1.98 m)	215 lb (98 kg)	1987-03-18	Skyline HS (TX)
PF	24	Paul Millsap	6 ft 8 in (2.03 m)	258 lb (117 kg)	1985-02-10	Louisiana Tech
C	13	Mehmet Okur	6 ft 11 in (2.11 m)	263 lb (119 kg)	1979-05-26	Turkey
PG	17	Ronnie Price	6 ft 2 in (1.88 m)	190 lb (86 kg)	1983-06-21	Utah Valley
PG	8	Deron Williams	6 ft 3 in (1.91 m)	205 lb (93 kg)	1984-06-26	Illinois

Coaches
Head coach
- Jerry Sloan
Assistant(s)
- Tyrone Corbin
- Phil Johnson
- Scott Layden
- Mark McKown

Legend
- (DP) Unsigned draft pick
- (FA) Free agent
- (S) Suspended
- Injured

Roster
Updated: April 13, 2008

== Regular season ==
=== Standings ===
Northwest Division	W	L	PCT	GB	Home	Road	Div
y-Utah Jazz	54	28	.659	–	37–4	17–24	13–3
x-Denver Nuggets	50	32	.610	4	33–8	17–24	10–6
Portland Trail Blazers	41	41	.500	13	28–13	13–28	10–6
Minnesota Timberwolves	22	60	.268	32	15–26	7–34	3–13
Seattle SuperSonics	20	62	.244	34	13–28	7–34	6–10

#	Western Conference				
#	Team	W	L	PCT	GB
1	c-Los Angeles Lakers	57	25	.695	–
2	y-New Orleans Hornets	56	26	.683	1
3	x-San Antonio Spurs	56	26	.683	1
4	y-Utah Jazz	54	28	.659	3
5	x-Houston Rockets	55	27	.671	2
6	x-Phoenix Suns	55	27	.671	2
7	x-Dallas Mavericks	51	31	.622	6
8	x-Denver Nuggets	50	32	.610	7
9	Golden State Warriors	48	34	.585	9
10	Portland Trail Blazers	41	41	.500	16
11	Sacramento Kings	38	44	.463	19
12	Los Angeles Clippers	23	59	.280	34
13	Minnesota Timberwolves	22	60	.268	35
14	Memphis Grizzlies	22	60	.268	35
15	Seattle SuperSonics	20	62	.244	37

=== Game log ===
==== October ====
Record: 1–0; home: 0–0; road: 1–0

#	Date	Visitor	Score	Home	OT	Leading scorer	Attendance	Record
1	October 30	Jazz	W 117–96	Warriors	NA	Boozer (32)	19,832	1–0

==== November ====
Record: 11–5; home: 7–1; road: 4–4

#	Date	Visitor	Score	Home	OT	Leading scorer	Attendance	Record
2	November 1	Rockets	L 95–106	Jazz	NA	Boozer (30)	19,911	1–1
3	November 3	Warriors	W 133–110	Jazz	NA	Williams (30)	19,911	2–1
4	November 4	Jazz	L 109–119	Lakers	NA	Williams (26)	18,997	2–2
5	November 7	Cavaliers	W 103–101	Jazz	NA	Millsap (24)	19,911	3–2
6	November 9	Jazz	W 103–101	SuperSonics	NA	Boozer (27)	15,980	4–2
7	November 10	Grizzlies	W 118–94	Jazz	NA	Boozer (31)	19,771	5–2
8	November 12	Kings	W 117–93	Jazz	NA	Boozer (32)	19,911	6–2
9	November 14	Jazz	W 92–88	Raptors	NA	Boozer (23)	17,337	7–2
10	November 16	Jazz	L 94–99	Cavaliers	NA	Boozer (26)	19,862	7–3
11	November 17	Jazz	L 97–117	Pacers	NA	Boozer (19)	12,447	7–4
12	November 19	Nets	W 102–75	Jazz	NA	Williams (20)	19,911	8–4
13	November 23	Hornets	W 99–71	Jazz	NA	Boozer (19)	19,911	9–4
14	November 25	Jazz	W 103–93	Pistons	NA	Boozer (36)	22,076	10–4
15	November 26	Jazz	L 109–113	Knicks	NA	Boozer (30)	18,816	10–5
16	November 28	Jazz	W 106–95	76ers	NA	Boozer (26)	11,006	11–5
17	November 30	Lakers	W 120–96	Jazz	NA	Williams (35)	19,911	12–5

==== December ====
Record: 5–11; home: 4–2; road: 1–9

#	Date	Visitor	Score	Home	OT	Leading scorer	Attendance	Record
18	December 3	Heat	W 110–101	Jazz	NA	Okur (25)	19,911	13–5
19	December 4	Jazz	L 107–117	Kings	NA	Williams (30)	12,688	13–6
20	December 7	Jazz	L 98–104	Spurs	NA	Two Way Tie	18,797	13–7
21	December 8	Jazz	L 117–125	Mavericks	NA	Williams (41)	20,300	13–8
22	December 11	Trail Blazers	L 89–97	Jazz	NA	Boozer (29)	19,911	13–9
23	December 12	Jazz	L 98–103	Suns	NA	Boozer (24)	18,422	13–10
24	December 14	Jazz	L 91–99	Trail Blazers	NA	Boozer (22)	19,980	13–11
25	December 15	SuperSonics	W 96–75	Jazz	NA	Boozer (21)	19,911	14–11
26	December 17	Jazz	L 111–116	Hawks	NA	Boozer (39)	15,263	14–12
27	December 19	Jazz	L 92–98	Bobcats	NA	Boozer (21)	13,014	14–13
28	December 21	Jazz	W 113–64	Magic	NA	Millsap (28)	17,519	15–13
29	December 22	Jazz	L 102–104	Heat	NA	Williams (22)	19,600	15–14
30	December 26	Mavericks	W 99–90	Jazz	NA	Boozer (21)	19,911	16–14
31	December 28	Jazz	L 109–123	Lakers	NA	Boozer (20)	18,997	16–15
32	December 29	Celtics	L 98–104	Jazz	NA	Williams (22)	19,911	16–16
33	December 31	Trail Blazers	W 111–101	Jazz	NA	Boozer (19)	19,911	17–16

==== January ====
Record: 11–2; home: 9–0; road: 2–2

#	Date	Visitor	Score	Home	OT	Leading scorer	Attendance	Record
34	January 2	Sixers	W 110–107	Jazz	NA	Carlos Boozer (22)	19,911	18–16
35	January 5	Jazz	L 89–103	Trail Blazers	NA	Deron Williams (23)	20,450	18–17
36	January 8	Pacers	W 111–89	Jazz	NA	Carlos Boozer (22)	19,911	19–17
37	January 10	Suns	W 108–86	Jazz	NA	Mehmet Okur (22)	19,911	20–17
38	January 12	Magic	W 119–115	Jazz	NA	Mehmet Okur (29)	19,911	21–17
39	January 14	Bucks	W 98–87	Jazz	NA	Deron Williams (33)	19,911	22–17
40	January 17	Jazz	L 109–120	Nuggets	NA	Deron Williams (23)		22–18
41	January 18	Clippers	W 106–88	Jazz	NA	Carlos Boozer (19)	19,911	23–18
42	January 21	Jazz	W 109–93	Clippers	NA	Deron Williams (18)		24–18
43	January 25	Kings	W 127–113	Jazz	NA	Carlos Boozer (33)	19,911	25–18
44	January 27	Jazz	W 97–89	Rockets	NA	Three-way tie (17)		26–18
45	January 28	Spurs	W 97–91	Jazz	NA	Two-way tie (23)	19,911	27–18
46	January 30	Knicks	W 100–89	Jazz	NA	Deron Williams (22)	19,911	28–18

==== February ====
Record: 9–4; home: 5–0; road: 4–4

#	Date	Visitor	Score	Home	OT	Leading scorer	Attendance	Record
47	February 1	Jazz	W 96–87	Wizards	NA	Mehmet Okur (27)	20,173	29–18
48	February 2	Jazz	W 110–91	Grizzlies	NA	Carlos Boozer (19)	12,407	30–18
49	February 4	Hornets	W 110–88	Jazz	NA	Deron Williams (29)	19,911	31–18
50	February 6	Jazz	W 118–115	Nuggets	1	Deron Williams (29)		32–18
51	February 8	Jazz	L 104–117	Kings	NA	Carlos Boozer (23)		32–19
52	February 9	Bulls	W 97–87	Jazz	NA	Carlos Boozer (22)	19,911	33–19
53	February 13	Jazz	W 112–93	SuperSonics	NA	Carlos Boozer (22)		34–19
54	February 19	Warriors	W 119–109	Jazz	NA	Deron Williams (29)	19,911	35–19
55	February 22	Jazz	L 104–114	Clippers	NA	Deron Williams (26)		35–20
56	February 23	Hawks	W 100–94	Jazz	NA	Carlos Boozer (21)	19,911	36–20
57	February 26	Jazz	L 100–111	Timberwolves	NA	Carlos Boozer (34)		36–21
58	February 27	Pistons	W 103–95	Jazz	NA	Mehmet Okur (24)	19,911	37–21
59	February 29	Jazz	L 98–110	Hornets	NA	Mehmet Okur (23)		37–22

==== March ====
Record: 12–4; home: 8–1; road: 4–3

#	Date	Visitor	Score	Home	OT	Leading scorer	Attendance	Record
60	March 1	Jazz	W 113–92	Grizzlies	NA	Carlos Boozer (18)		38–22
61	March 3	Mavericks	W 116–110	Jazz	NA	Carlos Boozer (28)	19,911	39–22
62	March 5	Timberwolves	W 105–76	Jazz	NA	Deron Williams (21)	19,911	40–22
63	March 7	Jazz	W 126–118	Suns	NA	Two-way tie (25)	18,422	41–22
64	March 8	Nuggets	W 132–105	Jazz	NA	Mehmet Okur (27)	19,911	42–22
65	March 11	Jazz	L 96–108	Bulls	NA	Mehmet Okur (22)	21,970	42–23
66	March 12	Jazz	W 114–110	Bucks	NA	Deron Williams (26)		43–23
67	March 14	Jazz	W 110–92	Celtics	NA	Deron Williams (32)	18,624	44–23
68	March 15	Jazz	L 115–117	Nets	NA	Carlos Boozer (41)		44–24
69	March 17	Raptors	W 96–79	Jazz	NA	Deron Williams (21)	19,911	45–24
70	March 20	Lakers	L 95–106	Jazz	NA	Deron Williams (26)	19,911	45–25
71	March 22	SuperSonics	W 115–101	Jazz	NA	Carlos Boozer (26)	19,911	46–25
72	March 25	Bobcats	W 128–106	Jazz	NA	Carlos Boozer (28)	19,911	47–25
73	March 28	Clippers	W 121–101	Jazz	NA	Carlos Boozer (34)	19,911	48–25
74	March 30	Jazz	L 103–110	Timberwolves	NA	Carlos Boozer (25)		48–26
75	March 31	Wizards	W 129–87	Jazz	NA	C. J. Miles (29)	19,911	49–26

==== April ====
Record: 5–2; home: 4–0; road: 1–2

#	Date	Visitor	Score	Home	OT	Leading scorer	Attendance	Record
76	April 2	Timberwolves	W 117–100	Jazz	NA	Mehmet Okur (22)	19,911	50–26
77	April 4	Spurs	W 90–64	Jazz	NA	Mehmet Okur (17)	19,911	51–26
78	April 8	Jazz	W 77–66	Hornets	NA	Mehmet Okur (22)		52–26
79	April 10	Jazz	L 94–97	Mavericks	NA	Mehmet Okur (19)		52–27
80	April 12	Nuggets	W 124–97	Jazz	NA	Three-way tie (20)	19,911	53–27
81	April 14	Rockets	W 105–96	Jazz	NA	Carlos Boozer (21)	19,911	54–27
82	April 16	Jazz	L 80–109	Spurs	NA	C. J. Miles (12)	18,797	54–28

- Green background indicates win.
- Red background indicates loss.

== Player statistics ==
Legend
GP	Games played	GS	Games started	MPG	Minutes per game
FG%	Field-goal percentage	3P%	3-point field-goal percentage	FT%	Free-throw percentage
RPG	Rebounds per game	APG	Assists per game	SPG	Steals per game
BPG	Blocks per game	PPG	Points per game

=== Regular season ===
Player	GP	GS	MPG	FG%	3P%	FT%	RPG	APG	SPG	BPG	PPG
Morris Almond	9	0	4.3	.267	.250	.667	.2	.3	.11	.00	1.4
Carlos Boozer	81	81	34.9	.547	.000	.738	10.4	2.9	1.23	.51	21.1
Ronnie Brewer	76	76	27.5	.558	.220	.759	2.9	1.8	1.70	.25	12.0
Jarron Collins	70	9	10.0	.439	.000	.622	1.7	.5	.14	.09	1.7
Kyrylo Fesenko	9	0	7.8	.375	.000	.500	2.8	.2	.00	.33	1.6
Matt Harpring	76	0	18.1	.500	.200	.712	3.2	1.1	.59	.18	8.2
Jason Hart	57	0	10.6	.322	.355	.844	1.0	1.5	.53	.05	2.9
Andrei Kirilenko	72	72	30.8	.506	.379	.770	4.7	4.0	1.19	1.51	11.0
Kyle Korver*	75	0	23.1	.443	.375	.915	2.3	1.3	.56	.39	9.9
C. J. Miles	60	13	11.5	.479	.390	.788	1.3	.9	.53	.13	5.0
Paul Millsap	82	2	20.8	.504	.000	.677	5.6	1.0	.88	.89	8.1
Mehmet Okur	72	72	33.2	.445	.388	.804	7.7	2.0	.76	.40	14.5
Ronnie Price	61	3	9.6	.431	.347	.684	.8	1.3	.52	.05	3.7
Deron Williams	82	82	37.3	.507	.395	.803	3.0	10.5	1.10	.28	18.8

*Total for entire season including previous team(s)

=== Playoffs ===
Player	GP	GS	MPG	FG%	3P%	FT%	RPG	APG	SPG	BPG	PPG
Carlos Boozer	12	12	36.8	.415	.000	.714	12.3	2.8	.50	.17	16.0
Ronnie Brewer	12	12	25.4	.520	.167	.760	3.2	1.6	1.00	.33	10.2
Jarron Collins	5	0	4.0	.000	.000	.000	1.2	.2	.20	.20	.0
Matt Harpring	12	0	17.4	.397	.333	.800	2.8	.7	.58	.33	6.6
Jason Hart	2	0	3.0	.500	.000	.000	.0	.0	.00	.00	1.0
Andrei Kirilenko	12	12	32.3	.447	.227	.714	3.4	2.5	1.50	1.67	11.0
Kyle Korver	12	0	21.6	.411	.289	.920	2.2	.6	.33	.67	7.8
C. J. Miles	7	0	3.7	.357	.250	.000	.7	.0	.29	.00	1.7
Paul Millsap	12	0	17.5	.516	.000	.520	3.9	.3	.58	1.33	6.4
Mehmet Okur	12	12	38.5	.423	.373	.773	11.8	1.9	.67	.67	15.4
Ronnie Price	12	0	5.7	.323	.214	.769	.3	.9	.50	.17	2.8
Deron Williams	12	12	42.8	.492	.500	.773	3.6	10.0	.58	.33	21.6

== Playoffs ==
2008 playoff game log
First Round: 4–2 (home: 2–1; road: 2–1)

Game	Date	Team	Score	High points	High rebounds	High assists	Location Attendance	Series
1	April 19	@ Houston	93–82	Kirilenko (21)	Boozer (16)	Williams (10)	Toyota Center; 18,213	1–0
2	April 21	@ Houston	90–84	Williams (22)	Okur (16)	Williams (5)	Toyota Center; 18,158	2–0
3	April 24	Houston	92–94	Williams (28)	Boozer (13)	Williams (12)	EnergySolutions Arena; 19,911	2–1
4	April 26	Houston	86–82	Williams (17)	Okur (18)	Williams (9)	EnergySolutions Arena; 19,911	3–1
5	April 29	@ Houston	69–95	Boozer (19)	Boozer, Okur (10)	Williams (6)	Toyota Center; 18,269	3–2
6	May 2	Houston	113–91	Williams (25)	Okur (13)	Williams (9)	EnergySolutions Arena; 19,911	4–2

Conference Semifinals: 2–4 (home: 2–1; road: 0–3)

Game	Date	Team	Score	High points	High rebounds	High assists	Location Attendance	Series
1	May 4	@ L.A. Lakers	98–109	Okur (21)	Okur (19)	Williams (9)	Staples Center; 18,997	0–1
2	May 7	@ L.A. Lakers	110–120	Williams (25)	Millsap (10)	Williams (10)	Staples Center; 18,997	0–2
3	May 9	L.A. Lakers	104–99	Boozer (27)	Boozer (20)	Williams (12)	EnergySolutions Arena; 19,911	1–2
4	May 11	L.A. Lakers	123–115	Williams (29)	Boozer (12)	Williams (14)	EnergySolutions Arena; 19,911	2–2
5	May 14	@ L.A. Lakers	104–111	Williams (27)	Okur (13)	Williams (10)	Staples Center; 18,997	2–3
6	May 16	L.A. Lakers	105–108	Williams (21)	Boozer (14)	Williams (14)	EnergySolutions Arena; 19,911	2–4

2008 playoff schedule

== Awards and records ==
During the season, Andrei Kirilenko was named FIBA Europe Player of the Year as the top European player in 2007. Unlike NBA awards, which are presented at the end of the season, Europe's major continent-wide player awards are presented at the end of a calendar year, and consider players' performances for both their clubs and national teams.

== Transactions ==
The Jazz have been involved in the following transactions during the 2007–08 season.

=== Trades ===
On December 29, 2007, the Utah Jazz announced that they would trade Gordan Giricek and a first round draft pick (through 2009–2014 pick) to the Philadelphia 76ers for Kyle Korver.

Before this trade the Jazz team lacked an outside shooter that they could count on during clutch times. Located in the western conference, Utah Jazz knew they had to make a blockbuster trade since top teams like Dallas Mavericks and Phoenix Suns were making their own big time trades.

After the trade Jazz had an up tempo team which led them to long winning streaks along with moving up the western conference standings. As a result, the Jazz had virtually clinched a spot in for the playoffs, the question now was which spot they would clinch.

=== Free agents ===
Player / Former team	Player / New team

== See also ==
- 2007–08 NBA season
- 2008 NBA Playoffs
