= 2007–08 Los Angeles Clippers season =

NBA professional basketball team season

- Head coach: Mike Dunleavy, Sr.
- Arena: Staples Center

Results
- Record: 23–59 (.280)
- Place: Division: 5th (Pacific); Conference: 12th (Western)
- Playoff finish: Did not qualify
- Stats at Basketball Reference

Local media
- Television: Prime Ticket, KTLA
- Radio: KSPN

The 2007–08 Los Angeles Clippers season was their 38th season in the NBA and their 24th in Los Angeles.

Key dates prior to the start of the season:

- The 2007 NBA draft took place in New York City on June 28.
- The free agency period begins in July.

== Draft picks ==
Los Angeles' selections from the 2007 NBA draft in New York City.

Round	Pick	Player	Position	Nationality	School/Club team
1	14	Al Thornton	Forward	United States	FSU
2	45	Jared Jordan	Point guard	United States	Marist

== Roster ==
2007–08 Los Angeles Clippers roster
Players

Pos.	No.	Player	Height	Weight	DOB	From
F/C	42	Elton Brand	6 ft 8 in (2.03 m)	254 lb (115 kg)		Duke
C	40	Paul Davis	6 ft 11 in (2.11 m)	270 lb (122 kg)		Michigan State
G	10	Dan Dickau	6 ft 0 in (1.83 m)	190 lb (86 kg)		Gonzaga
F	20	Nick Fazekas	6 ft 11 in (2.11 m)	235 lb (107 kg)		Nevada
C	35	Chris Kaman	7 ft 0 in (2.13 m)	265 lb (120 kg)		Central Michigan
PG	22	Brevin Knight	5 ft 10 in (1.78 m)	170 lb (77 kg)		Stanford
PG	14	Shaun Livingston (IN)	6 ft 7 in (2.01 m)	182 lb (83 kg)		Peoria Central HS (IL)
SF	50	Corey Maggette	6 ft 6 in (1.98 m)	225 lb (102 kg)		Duke
SG	5	Cuttino Mobley	6 ft 4 in (1.93 m)	215 lb (98 kg)		Rhode Island
G	1	Smush Parker	6 ft 4 in (1.93 m)	190 lb (86 kg)		Fordham
PF	21	Josh Powell	6 ft 9 in (2.06 m)	235 lb (107 kg)		NC State
G	13	Quinton Ross	6 ft 6 in (1.98 m)	193 lb (88 kg)		SMU
F	2	Tim Thomas	6 ft 10 in (2.08 m)	240 lb (109 kg)		Villanova
F	12	Al Thornton	6 ft 8 in (2.03 m)	220 lb (100 kg)		Florida State
F	3	Marcus Williams	6 ft 7 in (2.01 m)	205 lb (93 kg)		Arizona

Coaches
Head coach
- Mike Dunleavy (South Carolina)
Assistant(s)
- Jim Eyen (UC Santa Barbara)
- Kim Hughes (Wisconsin)
- Rory White (South Alabama)
- Neal Meyer (San Diego)

Legend
- (DP) Unsigned draft pick
- (FA) Free agent
- (S) Suspended
- Injured

Roster
Updated: 2008-03-12

=== Roster notes ===
- Forward Ruben Patterson and guard Smush Parker becomes the 13th and 14th former Lakers to play with the crosstown rival Clippers.
- Guard Guillermo Diaz signed two 10-day contracts and played 6 games. When Diaz's contract expired, the team then signed guard Andre Barrett to a 10-day contract and played 4 games. When his contract expired, the team then signed guard Smush Parker.

== Regular season ==
=== Season standings ===
Pacific Division	W	L	PCT	GB	Home	Road	Div
c-Los Angeles Lakers	57	25	.695	–	30–11	27–14	12–4
x-Phoenix Suns	55	27	.671	2	30–11	25–16	10–6
Golden State Warriors	48	34	.585	9	27–14	21–20	10–6
Sacramento Kings	38	44	.463	19	26–15	12–29	3–13
Los Angeles Clippers	23	59	.284	34	13–28	10–31	5–11

#	Western Conference				
#	Team	W	L	PCT	GB
1	c-Los Angeles Lakers	57	25	.695	–
2	y-New Orleans Hornets	56	26	.683	1
3	x-San Antonio Spurs	56	26	.683	1
4	y-Utah Jazz	54	28	.659	3
5	x-Houston Rockets	55	27	.671	2
6	x-Phoenix Suns	55	27	.671	2
7	x-Dallas Mavericks	51	31	.622	6
8	x-Denver Nuggets	50	32	.610	7
9	Golden State Warriors	48	34	.585	9
10	Portland Trail Blazers	41	41	.500	16
11	Sacramento Kings	38	44	.463	19
12	Los Angeles Clippers	23	59	.280	34
13	Minnesota Timberwolves	22	60	.268	35
14	Memphis Grizzlies	22	60	.268	35
15	Seattle SuperSonics	20	62	.244	37

=== Game log ===
==== November ====
Record: 6–8; Home: 4–4; Road: 2–4

#	Date	Visitor	Score	Home	OT	Leading scorer	Attendance	Record
1	November 2, 2007	Warriors	114–120	Clippers	NA	Chris Kaman (26)	19,060	1–0
2	November 4, 2007	SuperSonics	101–115	Clippers	NA	Corey Maggette (27)	17,376	2–0
3	November 6, 2007	Clippers	97–91	Bulls	NA	Cuttino Mobley (33)	21,742	3–0
4	November 7, 2007	Clippers	104–89	Pacers	NA	Sam Cassell (35)	10,122	4–0
5	November 9, 2007	Clippers	79–83	Pistons	NA	Chris Kaman (25)	22,076	4–1
6	November 11, 2007	Cavaliers	103–95	Clippers	NA	Sam Cassell (28)	15,541	4–2
7	November 14, 2007	Knicks	81–84	Clippers	NA	Chris Kaman (14)	15,296	5–2
8	November 16, 2007	Clippers	105–122	Warriors	NA	Tim Thomas (25)	19,596	5–3
9	November 17, 2007	Bulls	92–73	Clippers	NA	Chris Kaman (24)	17,535	5–4
10	November 21, 2007	Nuggets	90–101	Clippers	NA	Two Way Tie (17)	17,221	6–4
11	November 23, 2007	Clippers	94–113	Suns	NA	Sam Cassell (26)	18,422	6–5
12	November 24, 2007	Hornets	98–89	Clippers	NA	Cuttino Mobley (20)	15,601	6–6
13	November 26, 2007	Rockets	88–71	Clippers	NA	Cuttino Mobley (22)	15,452	6–7
14	November 30, 2007	Clippers	107–123	Nuggets	NA	Corey Maggette (26)	14,230	6–8

==== December ====
Record: 4–9; Home: 1–4; Road: 3–5

#	Date	Visitor	Score	Home	OT	Leading scorer	Attendance	Record
15	December 2, 2007	Pacers	101–95	Clippers	NA	Chris Kaman (22)	13,741	6–9
16	December 4, 2007	Bucks	87–78	Clippers	NA	Corey Maggette (20)	16,004	6–10
17	December 5, 2007	Clippers	88–95	SuperSonics	NA	Corey Maggette (23)	10,961	6–11
18	December 7, 2007	Clippers	97–87	Kings	NA	Chris Kaman (26)	13,094	7–11
19	December 9, 2007	Miami Heat	100–94	Clippers	NA	Corey Maggette (24)	16,335	7–12
20	December 11, 2007	Clippers	91–82	Nets	NA	Two Way Tie (18)	13,433	8–12
21	December 12, 2007	Clippers	103–108	Bobcats	NA	Corey Maggette (23)	10,751	8–13
22	December 14, 2007	Clippers	98–91	Grizzlies	NA	Two Way Tie (23)	10,819	9–13
23	December 16, 2007	Clippers	92–113	Lakers	NA	Corey Maggette (27)	18,997	9–14
24	December 18, 2007	Raptors	80–77	Clippers	NA	Corey Maggette (22)	14,455	9–15
25	December 21, 2007	Clippers	89–102	Mavericks	NA	Chris Kaman (24)	20,246	9–16
26	December 22, 2007	Clippers	90–99	Spurs	NA	Al Thornton (25)	18,797	9–17
27	December 27, 2007	Suns	108–88	Clippers	NA	Corey Maggette (21)	18,422	9–18
28	December 28, 2007	Clippers	88–94	Suns	NA	Chris Kaman (22)	17,871	9–19
29	December 31, 2007	Timberwolves	82–91	Clippers	NA	Cuttino Mobley (18)	14,404	10–19

==== January ====
Record: 4–9; Home: 4–6; Road: 0–3

#	Date	Visitor	Score	Home	OT	Leading scorer	Attendance	Record
30	January 2, 2008	Hornets	95–81	Clippers	NA	Corey Maggette (20)	14,965	10–20
31	January 6, 2008	Spurs	82–88	Clippers	NA	Chris Kaman (20)	16,623	10–21
32	January 9, 2008	Magic	113–106	Clippers	NA	Corey Maggette (27)	15,091	10–22
33	January 12, 2008	Mavericks	95–94	Clippers	NA	Tim Thomas (21)	16,494	10–23
34	January 15, 2008	Suns	97–90	Clippers	NA	Sam Cassell (32)	16,063	11–23
35	January 18, 2008	Clippers	88–106	Jazz	NA	Corey Maggette (20)	19,911	11–24
36	January 19, 2008	Nets	107–120	Clippers	1	Corey Maggette (31)	18,691	12–24
37	January 21, 2008	Jazz	109–93	Clippers	NA	Corey Maggette (23)	16,318	12–25
38	January 23, 2008	Kings	85–111	Clippers	NA	Al Thornton (23)	15,513	13–25
39	January 25, 2008	Clippers	92–111	Hornets	NA	Corey Maggette (24)	13,538	13–26
40	January 26, 2008	Clippers	120–125	Grizzlies	1	Corey Maggette (35)	11,072	13–27
41	January 28, 2008	Bobcats	107–100	Clippers	NA	Tim Thomas (29)	14,429	13–28
42	January 30, 2008	Hawks	88–95	Clippers	NA	Al Thornton (33)	14,874	14–28

==== February ====
Record: 5–9; Home: 2–3; Road: 3–6

#	Date	Visitor	Score	Home	OT	Leading scorer	Attendance	Record
43	February 1, 2008	Clippers	83–104	Timberwolves	NA	Sam Cassell (17)	12,739	14–29
44	February 2, 2008	Clippers	94–108	Cavaliers	NA	Al Thornton (23)	20,562	14–30
45	February 4, 2008	Clippers	103–94	Knicks	NA	Brevin Knight (19)	18,050	15–30
46	February 6, 2008	Clippers	100–111	Celtics	NA	Corey Maggette (33)	18,624	15–31
47	February 8, 2008	Clippers	102–98	Raptors	NA	Corey Maggette (35)	19,800	16–31
48	February 9, 2008	Clippers	80–101	Sixers	NA	Corey Maggette (26)	15,186	16–32
49	February 11, 2008	Clippers	96–89	Bucks	NA	Al Thornton (25)	13,319	17–32
50	February 13, 2008	Wizards	91–89	Clippers	NA	Al Thornton (24)	17,144	17–33
51	February 20, 2008	Grizzlies	86–100	Clippers	NA	Corey Maggette (30)	16,117	18–33
52	February 22, 2008	Jazz	104–114	Clippers	NA	Corey Maggette (27)	19,060	19–33
53	February 23, 2008	Lakers	113–95	Clippers	NA	Corey Maggette (23)	20,262	19–34
54	February 25, 2008	Celtics	104–76	Clippers	NA	Tim Thomas (15)	19,328	19–35
55	February 27, 2008	Trail Blazers	82–80	Clippers	NA	Corey Maggette (32)	16,494	19–36
56	February 29, 2008	Clippers	104–110	Nuggets	NA	Al Thornton (33)	19,155	19–37

==== March ====
Record: 3–15; Home: 2–6; Road: 1–9

#	Date	Visitor	Score	Home	OT	Leading scorer	Attendance	Record
57	March 1, 2008	Pistons	103–73	Clippers	NA	Corey Maggette (22)	19,271	19–38
58	March 3, 2008	Sixers	106–80	Clippers	NA	Al Thornton (20)	15,691	19–39
59	March 5, 2008	Kings	109–116	Clippers	1	Al Thornton (27)	17,030	20–39
60	March 7, 2008	Clippers	82–119	Lakers	NA	Corey Maggette (22)	18,997	20–40
61	March 8, 2008	Timberwolves	99–96	Clippers	NA	Corey Maggette (29)	17,807	20–41
62	March 10, 2008	Clippers	99–98	Heat	NA	Cuttino Mobley (29)	19,014	21–41
63	March 12, 2008	Clippers	88–110	Magic	NA	Corey Maggette (22)	16,312	21–42
64	March 14, 2008	Clippers	93–117	Hawks	NA	Two Way Tie (18)	16,107	21–43
65	March 15, 2008	Clippers	109–119	Wizards	1	Corey Maggette (34)	20,173	21–44
66	March 17, 2008	Clippers	90–99	Timberwolves	NA	Corey Maggette (34)	10,034	21–45
67	March 19, 2008	Warriors	116–100	Clippers	NA	Al Thornton (24)	18,704	21–46
68	March 21, 2008	Clippers	102–107	Trail Blazers	NA	Cuttino Mobley (24)	19,980	21–47
69	March 22, 2008	Trail Blazers	83–72	Clippers	NA	Corey Maggette (21)	18,248	21–48
70	March 25, 2008	Clippers	90–103	Mavericks	NA	Corey Maggette (21)	20,207	21–49
71	March 26, 2008	Clippers	88–97	Spurs	NA	Corey Maggette (22)	18,797	21–50
72	March 28, 2008	Clippers	101–121	Jazz	NA	Corey Maggette (28)	19,911	21–51
73	March 29, 2008	Grizzlies	97–110	Clippers	NA	Al Thornton (39)	18,125	22–51
74	March 31, 2008	Mavericks	93–86	Clippers	NA	Al Thornton (26)	17,124	22–52

==== April ====
Record: 1–7; Home: 0–3; Road: 1–4

#	Date	Visitor	Score	Home	OT	Leading scorer	Attendance	Record
75	April 2, 2008	Clippers	102–84	SuperSonics	NA	Al Thornton (21)	10,392	23–52
76	April 3, 2008	Clippers	98–100	Kings	NA	Corey Maggette (28)	12,707	23–53
77	April 6, 2008	Rockets	105–79	Clippers	NA	Josh Powell (22)	17,932	23–54
78	April 8, 2008	Nuggets	117–99	Clippers	NA	Cuttino Mobley (25)	19,060	23–55
79	April 10, 2008	Lakers	106–78	Clippers	NA	Elton Brand (23)	20,084	23–56
80	April 12, 2008	Clippers	116–122	Warriors	NA	Cuttino Mobley (30)	19,706	23–57
81	April 15, 2008	Clippers	92–114	Hornets	NA	Al Thornton (26)	17,388	23–58
82	April 16, 2008	Clippers	75–93	Rockets	NA	Corey Maggette (22)	18,386	23–59

- Green background indicates win.
- Red background indicates regulation loss.

== Player statistics ==
Legend
GP	Games played	GS	Games started	MPG	Minutes per game
FG%	Field-goal percentage	3P%	3-point field-goal percentage	FT%	Free-throw percentage
RPG	Rebounds per game	APG	Assists per game	SPG	Steals per game
BPG	Blocks per game	PPG	Points per game

=== Regular season ===
Player	GP	GS	MPG	FG%	3P%	FT%	RPG	APG	SPG	BPG	PPG
Andre Barrett	4	0	6.3	.400	.333	.500	.3	1.8	.00	.00	1.5
Elton Brand	8	6	34.3	.456	.000	.787	8.0	2.0	.38	1.88	17.6
Paul Davis	22	1	8.8	.369	.000	.600	2.1	.5	.27	.27	2.5
Guillermo Diaz	6	0	3.0	.250	.000	.600	.3	.2	.00	.00	.8
Dan Dickau	67	8	15.5	.419	.333	.829	1.4	2.6	.48	.04	5.3
Nick Fazekas*	26	0	10.3	.561	.000	.682	3.4	.4	.31	.42	4.1
Richie Frahm	10	2	16.3	.370	.280	.000	1.4	.8	.20	.00	4.7
Chris Kaman	56	55	37.2	.483	.000	.762	12.7	1.9	.59	2.77	15.7
Brevin Knight	74	39	22.6	.404	.000	.873	1.9	4.4	1.35	.15	4.6
Corey Maggette	70	65	35.7	.458	.384	.812	5.6	2.7	1.01	.10	22.1
Cuttino Mobley	77	38	35.1	.433	.349	.819	3.6	2.6	1.01	.44	12.8
Smush Parker*	28	2	21.1	.348	.231	.679	1.8	3.0	.86	.21	5.9
Ruben Patterson	20	5	16.4	.453	.000	.558	3.2	.9	1.05	.35	5.1
Josh Powell	64	25	19.2	.460	.000	.724	5.2	.7	.22	.36	5.5
Quinton Ross	76	44	19.8	.391	.429	.667	2.3	1.2	.57	.43	4.1
Tim Thomas	63	51	30.8	.413	.306	.752	5.1	2.7	.63	.46	12.4
Al Thornton	79	31	27.3	.429	.331	.743	4.5	1.2	.58	.54	12.7
Aaron Williams	30	5	9.9	.491	.000	.778	2.0	.3	.40	.50	2.3
Marcus Williams*	11	0	3.3	.250	.000	.000	1.1	.3	.09	.09	.9

*Total for entire season including previous team(s)

== Transactions ==
The Clippers have been involved in the following transactions during the 2007–08 season.

=== Trades ===
September 30, 2007
To Los Angeles Clippers

- Cash considerations
To New York Knicks

- Jared Jordan

=== Free agents ===
==== Re-signed ====
Player	Signed	Contract
Yaroslav Korolev	October 2, 2010	One-year non-guaranteed deal

==== Additions ====
Player	Signed	Former team
Brevin Knight	August 13	Charlotte Bobcats
Josh Powell	August 14	Golden State Warriors
Ruben Patterson	August 29	Milwaukee Bucks
Dan Dickau	October 3	New York Knicks
Richie Frahm	December 14	Benetton Treviso (Serie A2 Basket)
Guillermo Diaz	January 8	Anaheim Arsenal (NBDL)
Nick Fazekas	February 27	Dallas Mavericks
Andre Barrett	March 1	Austin Toros (NBDL)
Smush Parker	March 12	Miami Heat
Marcus Williams	March 28	San Antonio Spurs

==== Subtractions ====
Player	Left	New team
Daniel Ewing	waived, June 27	Khimki BC (VTB United League)
James Singleton	released, June 27	TAU Cerámica (Liga ACB)
Jason Hart	free agency, July 13	Utah Jazz
Will Conroy	waived, August 20	Virtus Bologna (Lega Basket Serie A)
Yaroslav Korolev	waived, October 25	Dynamo Moscow (Russian Basketball Super League)
Ruben Patterson	waived, December 13	Champville SC (FLB)
Richie Frahm	waived, January 7	Reno Bighorns (NBDL)
Guillermo Diaz	contract expired, January 28	Pepsi Caserta (Lega Basket Serie A)
Sam Cassell	waived, February 28	Boston Celtics
Andre Barrett	contract expired, March 11	FC Barcelona Basquet (Liga ACB)
Aaron Williams	waived, March 28	Xavier University (assistant coach)

== See also ==
- 2007–08 NBA season
