= 2007–08 Minnesota Timberwolves season =

NBA professional basketball team season

- Head coach: Randy Wittman
- General manager: Kevin McHale
- Owner: Glen Taylor
- Arena: Target Center

Results
- Record: 22–60 (.268)
- Place: Division: 4th (Northwest); Conference: 14th (Western)
- Playoff finish: Did not qualify
- Stats at Basketball Reference

Local media
- Television: FSN North; KSTC
- Radio: KLCI

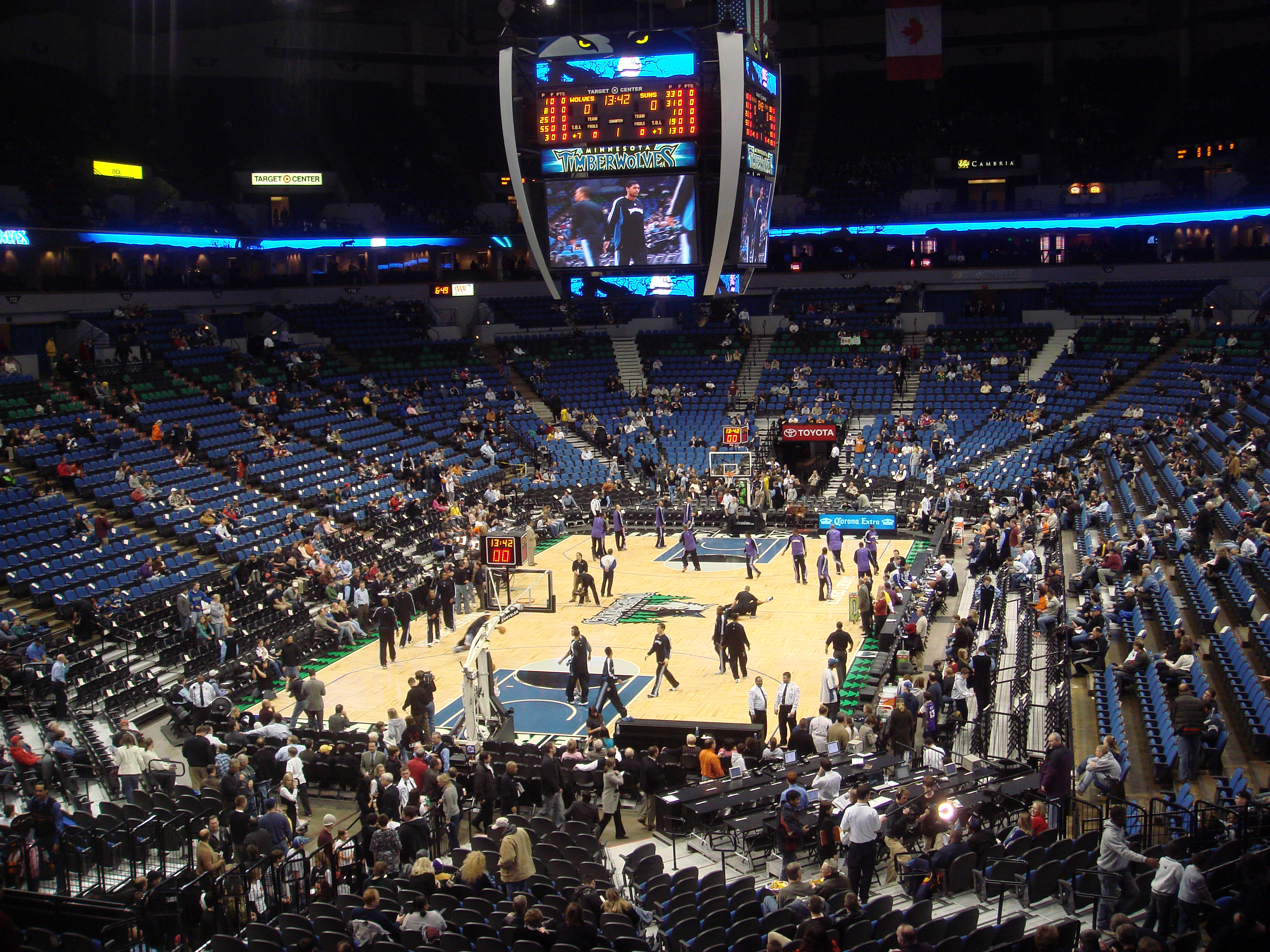
Players warming up prior to a January 2008 Wolves home game versus the Phoenix Suns.

The 2007–08 Minnesota Timberwolves season was their 19th season in the NBA and their first since the 1994-95 season that Kevin Garnett was not on the roster as he was traded to the Boston Celtics during the summer.

== Draft picks ==
Minnesota's selections from the 2007 NBA draft in New York City.

Round	Pick	Player	Position	Nationality	School/Club team
1	7	Corey Brewer	Forward	United States	Florida
2	41	Chris Richard	Power Forward	United States	Florida

== Roster ==
2007–08 Minnesota Timberwolves roster
Players

Pos.	No.	Player	Height	Weight	DOB	From
SF	22	Corey Brewer	6 ft 9 in (2.06 m)	185 lb (84 kg)	1986-03-05	Florida
SG	7	Greg Buckner	6 ft 4 in (1.93 m)	210 lb (95 kg)	1976-09-16	Clemson
C	51	Michael Doleac	6 ft 11 in (2.11 m)	262 lb (119 kg)	1977-06-15	Utah
PG	4	Randy Foye	6 ft 4 in (1.93 m)	213 lb (97 kg)	1983-09-24	Villanova
PF	8	Ryan Gomes	6 ft 7 in (2.01 m)	250 lb (113 kg)	1982-09-01	Providence
SG	55	Marko Jarić	6 ft 7 in (2.01 m)	224 lb (102 kg)	1978-10-12	Serbia
C	25	Al Jefferson	6 ft 10 in (2.08 m)	256 lb (116 kg)	1985-01-04	Prentiss HS (MS)
PF	35	Mark Madsen	6 ft 9 in (2.06 m)	250 lb (113 kg)	1976-01-28	Stanford
SG	1	Rashad McCants	6 ft 4 in (1.93 m)	226 lb (103 kg)	1984-09-25	North Carolina
C	32	Chris Richard	6 ft 9 in (2.06 m)	252 lb (114 kg)	1984-12-25	Florida
PF	5	Craig Smith	6 ft 7 in (2.01 m)	272 lb (123 kg)	1983-11-10	Boston College
SF	30	Kirk Snyder	6 ft 6 in (1.98 m)	225 lb (102 kg)	1983-06-05	Nevada
PG	3	Sebastian Telfair	6 ft 0 in (1.83 m)	160 lb (73 kg)	1985-06-09	Lincoln HS (NY)
PF	24	Antoine Walker	6 ft 9 in (2.06 m)	245 lb (111 kg)	1976-08-12	Kentucky

Coaches
Head coach
- Randy Wittman
Assistant(s)
- J. B. Bickerstaff
- Brent Haskins
- Bob Ociepka
- Ed Pinckney
- Jerry Sichting
- Gregg Farnam (trainer)

Legend
- (DP) Unsigned draft pick
- (FA) Free agent
- (S) Suspended
- (DL) On assignment to D-League affiliate
- Injured

Roster
Updated: February 29, 2008

== Regular season ==
=== Season standings ===
Northwest Division	W	L	PCT	GB	Home	Road	Div
y-Utah Jazz	54	28	.659	–	37–4	17–24	13–3
x-Denver Nuggets	50	32	.610	4	33–8	17–24	10–6
Portland Trail Blazers	41	41	.500	13	28–13	13–28	10–6
Minnesota Timberwolves	22	60	.268	32	15–26	7–34	3–13
Seattle SuperSonics	20	62	.244	34	13–28	7–34	6–10

#	Western Conference				
#	Team	W	L	PCT	GB
1	c-Los Angeles Lakers	57	25	.695	–
2	y-New Orleans Hornets	56	26	.683	1
3	x-San Antonio Spurs	56	26	.683	1
4	y-Utah Jazz	54	28	.659	3
5	x-Houston Rockets	55	27	.671	2
6	x-Phoenix Suns	55	27	.671	2
7	x-Dallas Mavericks	51	31	.622	6
8	x-Denver Nuggets	50	32	.610	7
9	Golden State Warriors	48	34	.585	9
10	Portland Trail Blazers	41	41	.500	16
11	Sacramento Kings	38	44	.463	19
12	Los Angeles Clippers	23	59	.280	34
13	Minnesota Timberwolves	22	60	.268	35
14	Memphis Grizzlies	22	60	.268	35
15	Seattle SuperSonics	20	62	.244	37

=== Game log ===
2007–08 game log
November

Game	Date	Team	Score	High points	High rebounds	High assists	Location Attendance	Record
1	November 2	Nuggets	91–99	McCants (23)	Jefferson (13)	Telfair (5)	Target Center; 19,443	0–1
2	November 4	@ Knicks	93–97	Gomes (19)	Jefferson (12)	Telfair (7)	Madison Square Garden; 19,763	0–2
3	November 6	Magic	103–111	Jefferson (25)	Jefferson (10)	Jaric (10)	Target Center; 12,003	0–3
4	November 9	@ Lakers	93–107	Jefferson (24)	Jefferson (15)	Jaric (6)	Staples Center; 18,997	0–4
5	November 10	@ Kings	93–100	Jefferson (17)	Jefferson (12)	Buckner (5)	ARCO Arena; 13,170	0–5
6	November 14	Kings	108–103	McCants (33)	Jaric (8)	Telfair (8)	Target Center; 11,656	1–5
7	November 16	Wizards	89–105	McCants (19)	Jefferson (10)	Jaric (4)	Target Center; 11,783	1–6
8	November 17	Hornets	82–100	Jefferson (20)	Jefferson (10)	Three-way tie (3)	Target Center; 15,324	1–7
9	November 21	Cavaliers	86–97	Jefferson (30)	Jefferson (8)	Two-way tie (4)	Target Center; 15,224	1–8
10	November 23	@ Nuggets	93–99	Walker (24)	Jefferson (14)	Jaric (6)	Pepsi Center; 17,097	1–9
11	November 24	Hawks	87–94	Jefferson (23)	Jefferson (16)	Jaric (6)	Target Center; 14,101	1–10
12	November 26	@ Hornets	103–94	Jaric (21)	Buckner (9)	Telfair (8)	New Orleans Arena; 8,393	2–10
13	November 28	@ Mavericks	103–109	Jefferson (31)	Jefferson (14)	Jaric (7)	American Airlines Center; 20,054	2–11
14	November 30	Spurs	91–106	Jefferson (23)	Jefferson (11)	Two-way tie (4)	Target Center; 16,297	2–12

December

Game	Date	Team	Score	High points	High rebounds	High assists	Location Attendance	Record
15	December 1	@ Grizzlies	80–109	McCants (18)	Walker (9)	Telfair (6)	FedExForum; 12,896	2–13
16	December 4	Lakers	95–116	Telfair (16)	Jefferson (12)	Three-way tie (3)	Target Center; 17,513	2–14
17	December 6	@ Hawks	89–90	Smith (25)	Brewer (10)	Jaric (10)	Philips Arena; 12,232	2–15
18	December 8	Suns	100–93	Jefferson (32)	Jefferson (20)	Telfair (6)	Target Center; 19,356	3–15
19	December 11	@ Wizards	88–102	Smith (36)	Brewer (9)	Telfair (10)	Verizon Center; 12,177	3–16
20	December 12	@ 76ers	94–98	Jefferson (22)	Jefferson (11)	Telfair (11)	Wachovia Center; 10,971	3–17
21	December 14	Sonics	88–99	Jefferson (22)	Jefferson (16)	Two-way tie (6)	Target Center; 16,523	3–18
22	December 15	@ Bucks	92–95	Smith (30)	Jefferson (15)	Telfair (8)	Bradley Center; 15,512	3–19
23	December 17	@ Heat	87–91	Jefferson (22)	Jefferson (20)	Telfair (6)	AmericanAirlines Arena; 19,600	3–20
24	December 19	Warriors	98–111	Jefferson (24)	Jefferson (14)	Telfair (8)	Target Center; 13,001	3–21
25	December 21	Pacers	131–118	Jefferson (29)	Jefferson (13)	Telfair (11)	Target Center; 15,379	4–21
26	December 22	@ Hornets	76–110	Gomes (20)	Jefferson (13)	Green (4)	New Orleans Arena; 11,257	4–22
27	December 26	@ Warriors	101–105	Jefferson (20)	Jefferson (19)	Jaric (5)	Oracle Arena; 19,596	4–23
28	December 28	@ Blazers	98–109	Jefferson (22)	Two-way tie (7)	Telfair (11)	Rose Garden; 20,491	4–24
29	December 29	@ Sonics	90–109	Jefferson (17)	Two-way tie (8)	Telfair (6)	KeyArena; 14,038	4–25
30	December 31	@ Clippers	82–91	Jefferson (22)	Two-way tie (15)	Telfair (7)	Staples Center; 14,404	4–26

2007–08 season schedule

== Player statistics ==
=== Ragular season ===
Player	POS	GP	GS	MP	REB	AST	STL	BLK	PTS	MPG	RPG	APG	SPG	BPG	PPG
Al Jefferson	C	82	82	2,919	911	117	74	119	1,726	35.6	11.1	1.4	.9	1.5	21.0
Ryan Gomes	PF	82	74	2,434	475	145	65	10	1,033	29.7	5.8	1.8	.8	.1	12.6
Corey Brewer	SF	79	35	1,803	292	111	76	25	459	22.8	3.7	1.4	1.0	.3	5.8
Craig Smith	PF	77	11	1,547	353	60	36	17	727	20.1	4.6	.8	.5	.2	9.4
Marko Jarić	SG	75	56	2,189	222	311	97	32	621	29.2	3.0	4.1	1.3	.4	8.3
Rashad McCants	SG	75	24	2,020	206	162	66	18	1,114	26.9	2.7	2.2	.9	.2	14.9
Sebastian Telfair	PG	60	51	1,933	135	355	59	11	556	32.2	2.3	5.9	1.0	.2	9.3
Chris Richard	C	52	3	556	135	18	10	12	98	10.7	2.6	.3	.2	.2	1.9
Antoine Walker	PF	46	1	892	168	45	33	8	368	19.4	3.7	1.0	.7	.2	8.0
Randy Foye	PG	39	31	1,259	128	164	36	3	510	32.3	3.3	4.2	.9	.1	13.1
Greg Buckner	SG	31	4	520	65	39	21	2	124	16.8	2.1	1.3	.7	.1	4.0
Gerald Green^{†}	SF	29	0	358	62	29	8	4	147	12.3	2.1	1.0	.3	.1	5.1
Kirk Snyder^{†}	SF	27	18	680	114	56	19	14	227	25.2	4.2	2.1	.7	.5	8.4
Michael Doleac	C	24	8	257	49	7	10	10	57	10.7	2.0	.3	.4	.4	2.4
Mark Madsen	PF	20	6	151	38	4	3	2	9	7.6	1.9	.2	.2	.1	.5
Theo Ratliff^{†}	PF	10	6	214	39	7	3	19	63	21.4	3.9	.7	.3	1.9	6.3

- ^{†} Denotes player spent time with another team in the season. Stats reflect time with the Timberwolves only.

== Transactions ==
=== Trades ===
February 22, 2008 The Houston Rockets acquired Gerald Green from the Minnesota Timberwolves in exchange for Kirk Snyder, a future 2010 draft choice, and cash considerations.

== See also ==
- 2007–08 NBA season
