= 2007–08 Memphis Grizzlies season =

- Head coach: Marc Iavaroni
- President: Chris Wallace (vice)
- General manager: Chris Wallace
- Owner: Michael Heisley
- Arena: FedExForum

Results
- Record: 22–60 (.268)
- Place: Division: 5th (Southwest); Conference: 14th (Western)
- Playoff finish: Did not qualify
- Stats at Basketball Reference

Local media
- Television: FSN South; SportSouth
- Radio: WREC

The 2007–08 Memphis Grizzlies season was their 13th season in the National Basketball Association and seventh in Memphis. The Memphis Grizzlies failed to qualify for the Playoffs for the second straight season. They finished 14th in the Western Conference with an awful record of 22–60, being only marginally better than the 20-62 Seattle SuperSonics.

In February, Pau Gasol was traded to the Los Angeles Lakers for his younger brother Marc, who would play the following season.

As of 2023, there are three players on this team who are still active in the NBA (Mike Conley Jr., Rudy Gay, and Kyle Lowry), the most from any team from the 2007−08 season.

Key dates prior to the start of the season:

- The 2007 NBA draft took place in New York City on June 28.
- The free agency period begins in July.

== Draft picks ==
Round	Pick	Player	Position	Nationality	School
1	4	Mike Conley Jr.	PG	United States	Ohio State

== Roster ==
Memphis Grizzlies roster
Players

Pos.	No.	Player	Height	Weight	DOB	From
F	44	Andre Brown	6 ft 9 in (2.06 m)	245 lb (111 kg)		DePaul
F/C	54	Kwame Brown	6 ft 11 in (2.11 m)	270 lb (122 kg)		Glynn Academy (GA)
F	35	Brian Cardinal	6 ft 8 in (2.03 m)	245 lb (111 kg)		Purdue
F/C	34	Jason Collins	7 ft 0 in (2.13 m)	255 lb (116 kg)		Stanford
PG	11	Mike Conley Jr.	6 ft 1 in (1.85 m)	180 lb (82 kg)		Ohio State
G	3	Javaris Crittenton	6 ft 5 in (1.96 m)	200 lb (91 kg)		Georgia Tech
SF	22	Rudy Gay	6 ft 9 in (2.06 m)	220 lb (100 kg)		Connecticut
G/F	23	Casey Jacobsen	6 ft 6 in (1.98 m)	198 lb (90 kg)		Stanford
PG	1	Kyle Lowry	6 ft 0 in (1.83 m)	175 lb (79 kg)		Villanova
G	8	Aaron McKie	6 ft 5 in (1.96 m)	210 lb (95 kg)		Temple
F/C	31	Darko Miličić	7 ft 0 in (2.13 m)	275 lb (125 kg)		Serbia
G/F	33	Mike Miller	6 ft 8 in (2.03 m)	218 lb (99 kg)		Florida
G	2	Juan Carlos Navarro	6 ft 3 in (1.91 m)	169 lb (77 kg)		Spain
F	21	Hakim Warrick	6 ft 9 in (2.06 m)	219 lb (99 kg)		Syracuse

Coaches
Head coach
- Marc Iavaroni
Assistant(s)
- Johnny Davis
- Gordon Chiesa
- Andy Greer
- Dave Joerger
- Ron DuBois
- Mark Price

Legend
- (DP) Unsigned draft pick
- (FA) Free agent
- (S) Suspended
- Injured

Roster
Updated: 2008-02-04

== Standings ==
Southwest Division	W	L	PCT	GB	Home	Road	Div
y-New Orleans Hornets	56	26	.683	–	30–11	26–15	10–6
x-San Antonio Spurs	56	26	.683	–	34–7	22–19	10–6
x-Houston Rockets	55	27	.671	1	31–10	24–17	8–8
x-Dallas Mavericks	51	31	.622	5	34–7	17–24	10–6
Memphis Grizzlies	22	60	.268	34	14–27	8–33	2–14

#	Western Conference				
#	Team	W	L	PCT	GB
1	c-Los Angeles Lakers	57	25	.695	–
2	y-New Orleans Hornets	56	26	.683	1
3	x-San Antonio Spurs	56	26	.683	1
4	y-Utah Jazz	54	28	.659	3
5	x-Houston Rockets	55	27	.671	2
6	x-Phoenix Suns	55	27	.671	2
7	x-Dallas Mavericks	51	31	.622	6
8	x-Denver Nuggets	50	32	.610	7
9	Golden State Warriors	48	34	.585	9
10	Portland Trail Blazers	41	41	.500	16
11	Sacramento Kings	38	44	.463	19
12	Los Angeles Clippers	23	59	.280	34
13	Minnesota Timberwolves	22	60	.268	35
14	Memphis Grizzlies	22	60	.268	35
15	Seattle SuperSonics	20	62	.244	37

== Game log ==
=== October ===
Record: 0–1; Home: 0–1; Road: 0–0

#	Date	Visitor	Score	Home	OT	Leading scorer	Attendance	Record
1	31 October 2007	Spurs	104–101	Grizzlies	NA	Pau Gasol (22)	17,538	0–1

=== November ===
Record: 5–9; Home: 3–3; Road: 2–6

#	Date	Visitor	Score	Home	OT	Leading scorer	Attendance	Record
2	3 November 2007	Pacers	121–111	Grizzlies	NA	Kyle Lowry (19)	--	0–2
3	7 November 2007	Grizzlies	105–98	SuperSonics	NA	Rudy Gay (25)	--	1–2
4	9 November 2007	Grizzlies	98–110	Trail Blazers	NA	Rudy Gay (31)	--	1–3
5	10 November 2007	Grizzlies	94–118	Jazz	NA	Rudy Gay (18)	--	1–4
6	13 November 2007	Rockets	99–105	Grizzlies	NA	Pau Gasol (26)	--	2–4
7	14 November 2007	Grizzlies	99–102	Bucks	NA	Rudy Gay (26)	--	2–5
8	16 November 2007	Hornets	120–118	Grizzlies	1	Juan Carlos Navarro (28)	--	2–6
9	17 November 2007	Grizzlies	105–108	Mavericks	NA	Mike Miller (23)	--	2–7
10	19 November 2007	SuperSonics	108–125	Grizzlies	NA	Stromile Swift (24)	--	3–7
11	21 November 2007	Raptors	95–89	Grizzlies	NA	Two-way tie (16)	--	3–8
12	23 November 2007	Grizzlies	88–101	Spurs	NA	Juan Carlos Navarro (16)	--	3–9
13	24 November 2007	Wizards	118–124	Grizzlies	NA	Juan Carlos Navarro (28)	--	4–9
14	27 November 2007	Grizzlies	110–103	Nets	NA	Pau Gasol (22)	--	5–9
15	28 November 2007	Grizzlies	91–103	Raptors	NA	Juan Carlos Navarro (15)	--	5–10

=== December ===
Record: 3–12; Home: 2–7; Road: 1–5

#	Date	Visitor	Score	Home	OT	Leading scorer	Attendance	Record
16	1 December 2007	Timberwolves	80–109	Grizzlies	NA	Rudy Gay (21)	--	6–10
17	3 December 2007	Trail Blazers	106–105	Grizzlies	NA	Two-way tie (30)	--	6–11
18	5 December 2007	Grizzlies	92–105	Rockets	NA	Pau Gasol (23)	--	6–12
19	7 December 2007	Grizzlies	116–118	Hornets	1	Rudy Gay (31)	--	6–13
20	8 December 2007	Grizzlies	78–86	Hawks	NA	Rudy Gay (17)	--	6–14
21	11 December 2007	Pistons	113–103	Grizzlies	NA	Rudy Gay (20)	--	6–15
22	14 December 2007	Clippers	98–91	Grizzlies	NA	Mike Miller (23)	--	6–16
23	15 December 2007	Grizzlies	123–119	Magic	NA	Rudy Gay (32)	--	7–16
24	17 December 2007	Warriors	125–117	Grizzlies	NA	Rudy Gay (32)	--	7–17
25	19 December 2007	Spurs	85–88	Grizzlies	NA	Mike Miller (31)	--	8–17
26	21 December 2007	Grizzlies	67–94	Pistons	NA	Rudy Gay (18)	--	8–18
27	22 December 2007	Sixers	99–97	Grizzlies	NA	Pau Gasol (31)	--	8–19
28	26 December 2007	Hornets	116–98	Grizzlies	NA	Two-way tie (19)	--	8–20
29	28 December 2007	Rockets	103–83	Grizzlies	NA	Pau Gasol (23)	--	8–21
30	30 December 2007	Grizzlies	87–111	Spurs	NA	Pau Gasol (19)	--	8–22

=== January ===
Record: 5–11; Home: 4–5; Road: 1–6

#	Date	Visitor	Score	Home	OT	Leading scorer	Attendance	Record
31	2 January 2008	Grizzlies	90–72	Pacers	NA	Pau Gasol (30)	--	9–22
32	4 January 2008	Grizzlies	96–100	Celtics	NA	Rudy Gay (21)	--	9–23
33	6 January 2008	Heat	94–101	Grizzlies	NA	Pau Gasol (28)	--	10–23
34	8 January 2008	Lakers	117–101	Grizzlies	NA	Mike Miller (19)	--	10–24
35	10 January 2008	Grizzlies	113–116	Kings	NA	Rudy Gay (31)	--	10–25
36	11 January 2008	Grizzlies	104–116	Warriors	NA	Pau Gasol (43)	--	10–26
37	13 January 2008	Grizzlies	99–100	Lakers	NA	Mike Miller (27)	--	10–27
38	15 January 2008	Cavaliers	132–124	Grizzlies	1	Rudy Gay (30)	--	10–28
39	18 January 2008	SuperSonics	100–124	Grizzlies	NA	Mike Miller (25)	--	11–28
40	19 January 2008	Grizzlies	87–105	Bobcats	NA	Pau Gasol (28)	--	11–29
41	21 January 2008	Bulls	90–104	Grizzlies	NA	Two-way tie (24)	--	12–29
42	23 January 2008	Magic	112–85	Grizzlies	NA	Rudy Gay (20)	--	12–30
43	25 January 2008	Grizzlies	93–104	Wizards	NA	Mike Miller (21)	--	12–31
44	26 January 2008	Clippers	120–125	Grizzlies	1	Rudy Gay (34)	--	13–31
45	28 January 2008	Mavericks	103–84	Grizzlies	NA	Rudy Gay (18)	--	13–32
46	30 January 2008	Nuggets	106–102	Grizzlies	NA	Rudy Gay (30)	--	13–33

=== February ===
Record: 1–11; Home: 1–4; Road: 0–7

#	Date	Visitor	Score	Home	OT	Leading scorer	Attendance	Record
47	2 February 2008	Jazz	110–91	Grizzlies	NA	Rudy Gay (15)	--	13–34
48	5 February 2008	Bucks	102–97	Grizzlies	NA	Mike Miller (32)	--	13–35
49	8 February 2008	Grizzlies	81–92	Mavericks	NA	Rudy Gay (18)	--	13–36
50	9 February 2008	Grizzlies	99–112	Hornets	NA	Rudy Gay (26)	--	13–37
51	12 February 2008	Kings	94–107	Grizzlies	NA	Hakim Warrick (24)	--	14–37
52	13 February 2008	Grizzlies	88–102	Sixers	NA	Two-way tie (23)	--	14–38
53	19 February 2008	Grizzlies	101–108	SuperSonics	NA	Rudy Gay (23)	--	14–39
54	20 February 2008	Grizzlies	86–100	Clippers	NA	Rudy Gay (21)	--	14–40
55	22 February 2008	Mavericks	98–83	Grizzlies	NA	Rudy Gay (18)	--	14–41
56	24 February 2008	Grizzlies	89–109	Cavaliers	NA	Hakim Warrick (21)	--	14–42
57	26 February 2008	Suns	127–113	Grizzlies	NA	Rudy Gay (36)	--	14–43
58	29 February 2008	Grizzlies	95–116	Rockets	NA	Javaris Crittenton (22)	--	14–44

=== March ===
Record: 5–11; Home: 3–4; Road: 2–7

#	Date	Visitor	Score	Home	OT	Leading scorer	Attendance	Record
59	1 March 2008	Jazz	113–92	Grizzlies	NA	Rudy Gay (20)	--	14–45
60	4 March 2008	Grizzlies	97–112	Bulls	NA	Kyle Lowry (24)	--	14–46
61	5 March 2008	Nets	93–100	Grizzlies	NA	Hakim Warrick (25)	--	15–46
62	8 March 2008	Celtics	119–89	Grizzlies	NA	Hakim Warrick (15)	--	15–47
63	11 March 2008	Grizzlies	111–132	Suns	NA	Rudy Gay (20)	--	15–48
64	12 March 2008	Grizzlies	86–108	Nuggets	NA	Juan Carlos Navarro (16)	--	15–49
65	15 March 2008	Grizzlies	107–110	Warriors	NA	Hakim Warrick (23)	--	15–50
66	17 March 2008	Bobcats	80–98	Grizzlies	NA	Juan Carlos Navarro (21)	--	16–50
67	19 March 2008	Grizzlies	94–98	Timberwolves	NA	Rudy Gay (25)	--	16–51
68	21 March 2008	Grizzlies	120–106	Knicks	NA	Mike Miller (34)	--	17–51
69	22 March 2008	Kings	111–117	Grizzlies	NA	Rudy Gay (24)	--	18–51
70	24 March 2008	Nuggets	120–106	Grizzlies	NA	Rudy Gay (30)	--	18–52
71	26 March 2008	Grizzlies	106–107	Kings	1	Hakim Warrick (26)	--	18–53
72	28 March 2008	Grizzlies	114–111	Lakers	NA	Rudy Gay (28)	--	19–53
73	29 March 2008	Grizzlies	97–110	Clippers	NA	Rudy Gay (23)	--	19–54
74	31 March 2008	Hawks	116–99	Grizzlies	NA	Rudy Gay (29)	--	19–55

=== April ===
Record: 3–5; Home: 1–3; Road: 2–2

#	Date	Visitor	Score	Home	OT	Leading scorer	Attendance	Record
75	2 April 2008	Knicks	114–130	Grizzlies	NA	Javaris Crittenton (23)	--	20–55
76	4 April 2008	Warriors	117–86	Grizzlies	NA	Rudy Gay (23)	--	20–56
77	6 April 2008	Grizzlies	113–101	Timberwolves	NA	Mike Miller (34)	--	21–56
78	8 April 2008	Suns	127–113	Grizzlies	NA	Rudy Gay (36)	--	21–57
79	11 April 2008	Grizzlies	96–91	Heat	NA	Two-way tie (17)	--	22–57
80	12 April 2008	Timberwolves	114–105	Grizzlies	NA	Mike Conley Jr. (25)	--	22–58
81	15 April 2008	Grizzlies	91–113	Trail Blazers	NA	Hakim Warrick (17)	--	22–59
82	16 April 2008	Grizzlies	111–120	Nuggets	NA	Kyle Lowry (22)	--	22–60

- Green background indicates win.
- Red background indicates loss.

== Player statistics ==
=== Ragular season ===
Player	POS	GP	GS	MP	REB	AST	STL	BLK	PTS	MPG	RPG	APG	SPG	BPG	PPG
Juan Carlos Navarro	SG	82	30	2,117	210	177	48	1	896	25.8	2.6	2.2	.6	.0	10.9
Kyle Lowry	PG	82	9	2,089	250	296	92	22	791	25.5	3.0	3.6	1.1	.3	9.6
Rudy Gay	SF	81	81	3,000	499	158	111	79	1,632	37.0	6.2	2.0	1.4	1.0	20.1
Hakim Warrick	PF	75	30	1,754	356	53	36	28	852	23.4	4.7	.7	.5	.4	11.4
Mike Miller	SG	70	70	2,474	467	240	35	16	1,147	35.3	6.7	3.4	.5	.2	16.4
Darko Miličić	C	70	64	1,663	424	58	32	114	505	23.8	6.1	.8	.5	1.6	7.2
Mike Conley Jr.	PG	53	46	1,381	139	222	44	2	498	26.1	2.6	4.2	.8	.0	9.4
Casey Jacobsen	SG	53	0	547	65	20	5	1	107	10.3	1.2	.4	.1	.0	2.0
Pau Gasol^{†}	C	39	39	1,433	342	116	16	56	738	36.7	8.8	3.0	.4	1.4	18.9
Brian Cardinal	PF	37	1	440	96	22	10	2	124	11.9	2.6	.6	.3	.1	3.4
Stromile Swift^{†}	PF	35	4	549	129	22	10	36	238	15.7	3.7	.6	.3	1.0	6.8
Andre Brown	PF	33	1	286	92	8	7	4	100	8.7	2.8	.2	.2	.1	3.0
Jason Collins^{†}	C	31	3	488	89	6	12	17	80	15.7	2.9	.2	.4	.5	2.6
Damon Stoudamire^{†}	PG	29	29	624	71	112	19	0	211	21.5	2.4	3.9	.7	.0	7.3
Javaris Crittenton^{†}	SG	28	0	508	89	33	12	2	206	18.1	3.2	1.2	.4	.1	7.4
Kwame Brown^{†}	C	15	1	204	57	17	6	4	52	13.6	3.8	1.1	.4	.3	3.5
Tarence Kinsey	SG	11	0	96	12	2	3	0	40	8.7	1.1	.2	.3	.0	3.6
Bobby Jones^{†}	SF	9	2	137	27	11	5	2	40	15.2	3.0	1.2	.6	.2	4.4
Jeremy Richardson^{†}	SF	3	0	15	1	1	0	0	0	5.0	.3	.3	.0	.0	.0

- ^{†} Denotes player spent time with another team in the season. Stats reflect time with the Grizzlies only.

== Awards and records ==
=== Awards ===
- Juan Carlos Navarro, NBA All-Rookie Team 2nd Team

== Transactions ==
On July 27, the Memphis Grizzlies signed unrestricted free agent Darko Miličić. This is the third team Darko has played for in the past 4 years.

The Grizzlies biggest transaction this season has been trading their All Star center, Pau Gasol to the Los Angeles Lakers. The trade gave the Lakers some strength in the front court and gave the Grizzlies some draft picks and prospects and it opened up room in their Salary Cap

=== Free agents ===
Player	Former team
Darko Miličić	Orlando Magic
Andre Brown	Seattle SuperSonics

Player	New team
Chucky Atkins	Denver Nuggets
Damon Stoudamire	San Antonio Spurs

== See also ==
- 2007–08 NBA season
