= 2007–08 Sacramento Kings season =

NBA professional basketball team season

- Head coach: Reggie Theus
- President: Geoff Petrie
- General manager: Geoff Petrie
- Owners: Maloof family
- Arena: ARCO Arena

Results
- Record: 38–44 (.463)
- Place: Division: 4th (Pacific); Conference: 11th (Western)
- Playoff finish: Did not qualify
- Stats at Basketball Reference

Local media
- Television: CSN West, KXTV
- Radio: KHTK

The 2007–08 Sacramento Kings season was the 63rd season of the franchise, 59th in the National Basketball Association (NBA) and 23rd in Sacramento.

Key dates prior to the start of the season:

- The 2007 NBA draft took place in New York City on June 28.
- The free agency period began in July.

== Off-season notes ==
The Kings, following a disappointing 2006–07 season, fired coach Eric Musselman and replaced him with Reggie Theus.

== Draft picks ==
Sacramento's selections from the 2007 NBA draft in New York City.

Round	Pick	Player	Position	Nationality	School/Club team
1	10	Spencer Hawes	Center	United States	Washington

== Other notable additions ==
Daniel Artest, the brother of Ron Artest, made it on the summer league roster and practice squad. Artest scored two points as a back-up in limited summer league action.

== Roster ==
2007–08 Sacramento Kings roster
Players

Pos.	No.	Player	Height	Weight	DOB	From
F	3	Shareef Abdur-Rahim	6 ft 9 in (2.06 m)	245 lb (111 kg)		California
SF	93	Ron Artest	6 ft 7 in (2.01 m)	260 lb (118 kg)		St. John's
G	8	Quincy Douby	6 ft 3 in (1.91 m)	175 lb (79 kg)		Rutgers
G/F	32	Francisco García	6 ft 7 in (2.01 m)	195 lb (88 kg)		Louisville
C	31	Spencer Hawes	7 ft 0 in (2.13 m)	230 lb (104 kg)		Washington
PG	5	Anthony Johnson	6 ft 3 in (1.91 m)	195 lb (88 kg)		College of Charleston
SG	23	Kevin Martin	6 ft 7 in (2.01 m)	185 lb (84 kg)		Western Carolina
C	52	Brad Miller	7 ft 0 in (2.13 m)	261 lb (118 kg)		Purdue
C	33	Mikki Moore	7 ft 0 in (2.13 m)	223 lb (101 kg)		Nebraska
G/F	15	John Salmons	6 ft 6 in (1.98 m)	207 lb (94 kg)		Miami (FL)
F	9	Kenny Thomas	6 ft 7 in (2.01 m)	245 lb (111 kg)		New Mexico
PG	19	Beno Udrih	6 ft 3 in (1.91 m)	205 lb (93 kg)		Slovenia
F	22	Shelden Williams	6 ft 9 in (2.06 m)	250 lb (113 kg)		Duke
C	42	Lorenzen Wright	6 ft 11 in (2.11 m)	255 lb (116 kg)		Memphis

Coaches
Head coach
- Reggie Theus (UNLV)
Assistant(s)
- Randy Brown (New Mexico State)
- Bubba Burrage (Cal Poly)
- Jason Hamm (South Alabama)
- Rex Kalamian (Cal Poly Pomona)
- Kenny Natt (Louisiana–Monroe)
- Chuck Person (Auburn)

Legend
- (DP) Unsigned draft pick
- (FA) Free agent
- (S) Suspended
- Injured

Roster

== Standings ==
Pacific Division	W	L	PCT	GB	Home	Road	Div
c-Los Angeles Lakers	57	25	.695	–	30–11	27–14	12–4
x-Phoenix Suns	55	27	.671	2	30–11	25–16	10–6
Golden State Warriors	48	34	.585	9	27–14	21–20	10–6
Sacramento Kings	38	44	.463	19	26–15	12–29	3–13
Los Angeles Clippers	23	59	.284	34	13–28	10–31	5–11

#	Western Conference				
#	Team	W	L	PCT	GB
1	c-Los Angeles Lakers	57	25	.695	–
2	y-New Orleans Hornets	56	26	.683	1
3	x-San Antonio Spurs	56	26	.683	1
4	y-Utah Jazz	54	28	.659	3
5	x-Houston Rockets	55	27	.671	2
6	x-Phoenix Suns	55	27	.671	2
7	x-Dallas Mavericks	51	31	.622	6
8	x-Denver Nuggets	50	32	.610	7
9	Golden State Warriors	48	34	.585	9
10	Portland Trail Blazers	41	41	.500	16
11	Sacramento Kings	38	44	.463	19
12	Los Angeles Clippers	23	59	.280	34
13	Minnesota Timberwolves	22	60	.268	35
14	Memphis Grizzlies	22	60	.268	35
15	Seattle SuperSonics	20	62	.244	37

=== Game log ===
==== October ====
Record: 0–1; Home: 0–0; Road: 0–1

#	Date	Visitor	Score	Home	OT	Leading scorer	Attendance	Record
1	31 October 2007	Kings	90–104	Hornets	NA	Kevin Martin (26)	15,188	0–1

==== November ====
Record: 5–8; Home: 5–2; Road: 0–6

#	Date	Visitor	Score	Home	OT	Leading scorer	Attendance	Record
2	2 November 2007	Kings	80–96	Spurs	NA	Kevin Martin (22)	17,072	0–2
3	3 November 2007	Kings	102–123	Mavericks	NA	Kevin Martin (28)	20,343	0–3
4	6 November 2007	SuperSonics	98–104	Kings	NA	Kevin Martin (31)	14,908	1–3
5	9 November 2007	Cavaliers	93–91	Kings	NA	Kevin Martin (32)	15,293	1–4
6	10 November 2007	Timberwolves	93–100	Kings	NA	Kevin Martin (29)	13,170	2–4
7	12 November 2007	Kings	93–117	Jazz	NA	John Salmons (22)	19,911	2–5
9	14 November 2007	Kings	103–108	Timberwolves	NA	Kevin Martin (22)	11,656	2–6
10	16 November 2007	Knicks	118–123	Kings	2	Kevin Martin (43)	12,549	3–6
11	18 November 2007	Pistons	95–105	Kings	NA	Beno Udrih (23)	12,978	4–6
12	20 November 2007	Suns	100–98	Kings	NA	Ron Artest (33)	13,598	4–7
13	21 November 2007	Kings	111–127	Suns	NA	Francisco García (31)	18,422	4–8
14	23 November 2007	Kings	84–87	Trail Blazers	NA	Kevin Martin (21)	19,980	4–9
15	26 November 2007	Spurs	99–112	Kings	NA	Beno Udrih (27)	12,587	5–9

==== December ====
Record: 6–4; Home: 3–2; Road: 3–2

#	Date	Visitor	Score	Home	OT	Leading scorer	Attendance	Record
16	1 December 2007	Rockets	99–107	Kings	NA	Two-way tie (26)	15,081	6–10
17	4 December 2007	Jazz	107–117	Kings	NA	Kevin Martin (25)	12,688	7–10
18	7 December 2007	Clippers	97–87	Kings	NA	Ron Artest (21)	13,094	7–11
19	8 December 2007	Kings	97–101	Nuggets	NA	John Salmons (25)	15,493	7–12
20	10 December 2007	Bucks	93–96	Kings	NA	John Salmons (22)	12,449	8–12
21	12 December 2007	Kings	78–90	Celtics	NA	Two-way tie (16)	18,624	8–13
22	14 December 2007	Kings	109–99	Sixers	NA	Brad Miller (25)	10,856	9–13
23	15 December 2007	Kings	79–92	Wizards	NA	Brad Miller (21)	20,173	9–14
24	18 December 2007	Kings	106–101	Nets	NA	John Salmons (31)	11,902	10–14
25	19 December 2007	Kings	102–89	Bucks	NA	Ron Artest (26)	13,746	11–14
26	23 December 2007	Nuggets	106–105	Kings	NA	Ron Artest (24)	15,055	11–15

==== January ====
Record:; Home:; Road:

#	Date	Visitor	Score	Home	OT	Leading scorer	Attendance	Record

==== February ====
Record:; Home:; Road:

#	Date	Visitor	Score	Home	OT	Leading scorer	Attendance	Record

==== March ====
Record:; Home:; Road:

#	Date	Visitor	Score	Home	OT	Leading scorer	Attendance	Record

==== April ====
Record:; Home:; Road:

#	Date	Visitor	Score	Home	OT	Leading scorer	Attendance	Record

- Green background indicates win.
- Red background indicates regulation loss.
- White background indicates overtime/shootout loss.

== Player stats ==
Legend
GP	Games played	GS	Games started	MPG	Minutes per game
FG%	Field-goal percentage	3P%	3-point field-goal percentage	FT%	Free-throw percentage
RPG	Rebounds per game	APG	Assists per game	SPG	Steals per game
BPG	Blocks per game	PPG	Points per game

=== Regular season ===
Player	GP	GS	MPG	FG%	3P%	FT%	RPG	APG	SPG	BPG	PPG
Shareef Abdur-Rahim	6	0	8.5	.214	.000	1.000	1.7	.7	.17	.00	1.7
Ron Artest	57	54	38.1	.453	.380	.719	5.8	3.5	2.33	.67	20.5
Quincy Douby	74	0	11.8	.394	.344	.923	1.1	.7	.41	.16	4.8
Francisco García	79	20	26.5	.462	.391	.779	3.3	1.6	1.22	.63	12.3
Orien Greene	7	2	8.7	.273	.000	.000	.9	.4	.43	.14	.9
Spencer Hawes	71	8	13.1	.459	.190	.655	3.2	.6	.20	.56	4.7
Anthony Johnson*	27	11	15.2	.455	.500	.818	1.4	2.2	.37	.04	3.9
Dahntay Jones	25	0	8.2	.434	.167	.667	1.4	.5	.32	.24	3.2
Kevin Martin	61	57	36.3	.456	.402	.869	4.5	2.1	1.02	.08	23.7
Brad Miller	72	72	34.9	.463	.311	.848	9.5	3.7	.96	1.03	13.4
Mikki Moore	82	79	29.1	.577	.000	.736	6.0	1.0	.43	.56	8.5
John Salmons	81	41	31.1	.477	.325	.823	4.3	2.6	1.15	.38	12.5
Kenny Thomas	23	3	12.2	.421	.000	.000	2.7	.6	.26	.04	1.4
Beno Udrih	65	51	32.0	.464	.387	.850	3.3	4.3	.86	.15	12.8
Darryl Watkins	9	0	7.9	.333	.000	.400	1.3	.0	.22	.22	1.3
Shelden Williams*	28	0	12.9	.491	.000	.667	3.5	.3	.32	.36	5.2
Lorenzen Wright*	5	0	2.6	.250	.000	.000	.2	.2	.00	.00	.4

*Statistics include only games with the Kings

== Transactions ==
The Kings were involved in the following transactions during the 2007–08 season.

=== Free agents ===
Player / Former team	Player / New team

== See also ==
- 2007–08 NBA season
