= Mickaël Gelabale =

French basketball player (born 1983)

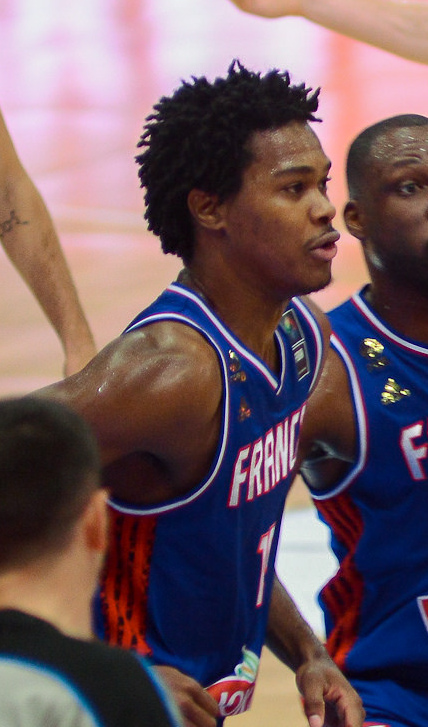
- Gelabale in 2015

Personal information
- Born: May 22, 1983 (age 43) Pointe-Noire, Guadeloupe
- Listed height: 6 ft 7 in (2.01 m)
- Listed weight: 215 lb (98 kg)

Career information
- NBA draft: 2005: 2nd round, 48th overall pick
- Drafted by: Seattle SuperSonics
- Playing career: 2001–2023
- Position: Small forward / power forward

Career history
- 2001–2004: Cholet
- 2004–2006: Real Madrid
- 2006–2008: Seattle SuperSonics
- 2008: →Idaho Stampede
- 2009: Los Angeles D-Fenders
- 2009–2010: Cholet
- 2010–2011: ASVEL
- 2011: Spirou Charleroi
- 2012: Khimki
- 2012: Cedevita
- 2012–2013: Valencia
- 2013: Minnesota Timberwolves
- 2013–2014: Khimki
- 2014: SIG Strasbourg
- 2015: Limoges CSP
- 2015–2017: Le Mans Sarthe
- 2017–2023: Élan Chalon

Career highlights
- EuroCup champion (2012); Liga ACB champion (2005); 2× Pro A champion (2010, 2015); French Cup winner (2016); Pro A Finals MVP (2010); Pro A French Player's MVP (2011); 2× Pro A All-Star (2004, 2010)
- Stats at NBA.com
- Stats at Basketball Reference
Medals
Men's basketball
Representing France
FIBA World Cup
| Bronze medal – third place | 2014 Spain |
EuroBasket
| Gold medal – first place | 2013 Slovenia |
| Silver medal – second place | 2011 Lithuania |
| Bronze medal – third place | 2005 Serbia and Montenegro |
| Bronze medal – third place | 2015 France–Croatia–Germany–Latvia |

Mickaël Gelabale (born May 22, 1983) is a French former professional basketball player who last played for Élan Chalon of the Pro B. He also represents the France national basketball team internationally. Standing at 2.01 m (6 ft 7 in), he plays either at the small forward position or the power forward position in a small ball configuration.

== Professional career ==
Gelabale started playing professionally with Cholet Basket, averaging 10 points and five rebounds per game in his final season (2003–04). Subsequently, he joined Real Madrid, being used in the side's rotation during two seasons (about 23 minutes per game combined).

At the end of his first season, Gelabale was selected by the Seattle SuperSonics in the second round (48th overall) of the 2005 NBA draft, but opted to stay in the Spanish capital instead of immediately joining the NBA.

On July 12, 2006, he signed a two-year contract with the Sonics, joining Johan Petro as the second French player on the team. Stuck on the depth chart behind both Ray Allen and Rashard Lewis (in 2006–07) and rookie Kevin Durant (2007–08), Gelabale appeared sparingly for the team, tearing his anterior cruciate ligament midway through his second year.

On March 29, 2009, he resumed playing, one year after his injury, with the Los Angeles D-Fenders in the NBA D-League.

On September 28, 2009, the Los Angeles Lakers of the NBA signed him to their practice squad to give him a chance at a long-term contract, but he was waived on October 10, 2009, two weeks before the beginning of the 2009–10 regular season. He then signed with Cholet Basket in the French Pro A on November 26, 2009. He won the 2009–2010 Pro A championship and was named MVP of the Play-Offs Final with Cholet.

In July 2010, Gelabale signed a contract with ASVEL.

In August 2011 he signed with Spirou Basket in Belgium for one year, but his contract was later indefinitely suspended because of an injury.

In January 2012 he signed with Khimki Moscow until the end of the season.

In August 2012 he signed with KK Cedevita. After the Croatian team was eliminated in the EuroLeague, Gelabale signed with Valencia Basket in December 2012.

On January 19, 2013, he signed a ten-day contract with the Minnesota Timberwolves. On January 29, 2013, he was signed to a second 10-day contract. On February 8, 2013, he signed with the Timberwolves for the rest of the season. Gelabale was waived by the Timberwolves on July 7, 2013.

On July 31, 2013, Gelabale signed a one-year contract with his former team Khimki.

On November 21, 2014, Gelabale signed a one-month contract with Strasbourg IG. After his contract expired, he left Strasbourg. On January 5, 2015, he signed with Limoges CSP.

On July 2, 2015, he signed a two-year contract with Le Mans Sarthe.

On October 10, 2017, he signed with Élan Chalon. He averaged 11.1 points and 5 rebounds per game in 2019–20. In June 2020, Gelabale extended his contract until 2022.

== French national team ==
In September 2005, Gelabale helped the senior men's French national team to the bronze medal at the EuroBasket 2005. In EuroBasket 2011, his team won the silver medal, and in EuroBasket 2013, they won the gold medal.

=== International stats ===
| Tournament | GP | PPG | RPG | APG |
|---|---|---|---|---|
| EuroBasket 2005 | 7 | 8.0 | 3.1 | 1.3 |
| 2006 FIBA World Championship | 9 | 8.7 | 4.6 | 0.7 |
| 2010 FIBA World Championship | 6 | 11.2 | 4.0 | 2.0 |
| EuroBasket 2011 | 9 | 7.3 | 1.8 | 1.0 |
| 2012 Olympics | 6 | 7.8 | 3.5 | 1.3 |
| EuroBasket 2013 | 11 | 7.6 | 2.9 | 1.5 |
| 2014 FIBA Basketball World Cup | 9 | 6.1 | 2.3 | 0.8 |
| EuroBasket 2015 | 9 | 6.4 | 2.4 | 0.3 |
| 2016 Olympics | 6 | 6.5 | 2.2 | 0.8 |

== Career statistics ==
Legend
| GP | Games played | GS | Games started | MPG | Minutes per game |
| FG% | Field-goal percentage | 3P% | 3-point field-goal percentage | FT% | Free-throw percentage |
| RPG | Rebounds per game | APG | Assists per game | SPG | Steals per game |
| BPG | Blocks per game | PPG | Points per game | PIR | Performance index rating |
| **Bold** | Career high |

=== NBA ===
| Year | Team | GP | GS | MPG | FG% | 3P% | FT% | RPG | APG | SPG | BPG | PPG |
|---|---|---|---|---|---|---|---|---|---|---|---|---|
| 2006–07 | Seattle | **70** | **14** | 17.7 | .462 | .234 | .805 | 2.5 | **.8** | .3 | **.3** | 4.6 |
| 2007–08 | Seattle | 39 | 0 | 11.9 | .439 | **.432** | .778 | 1.5 | **.8** | .3 | .2 | 4.3 |
| 2012–13 | Minnesota | 36 | 13 | **17.9** | **.518** | .308 | **.875** | **2.8** | .7 | **.4** | .1 | **5.0** |
| Career | | 145 | 27 | 16.2 | .470 | .316 | .815 | 2.3 | .8 | .3 | .2 | 4.6 |

=== EuroLeague ===
| Year | Team | GP | GS | MPG | FG% | 3P% | FT% | RPG | APG | SPG | BPG | PPG | PIR |
|---|---|---|---|---|---|---|---|---|---|---|---|---|---|
| 2004–05 | Real Madrid | 19 | **13** | 24.3 | **.607** | .333 | .788 | 4.3 | 1.1 | **.9** | .4 | 8.2 | 11.5 |
| 2005–06 | Real Madrid | **22** | 10 | 23.2 | .467 | .395 | .769 | 3.5 | .7 | .6 | **.5** | 7.9 | 8.3 |
| 2012–13 | Cedevita | 10 | 7 | **31.7** | .605 | **.421** | **.917** | **4.9** | **1.3** | .5 | .3 | **12.8** | **15.0** |
| Career | | 51 | 30 | 25.3 | .544 | .386 | .859 | 3.1 | 1.0 | .7 | .4 | 9.0 | 10.8 |

== See also ==
- List of French NBA players
