= 2007–08 Cleveland Cavaliers season =

NBA professional basketball team season

- Head coach: Mike Brown
- General manager: Danny Ferry
- Owner: Dan Gilbert
- Arena: Quicken Loans Arena

Results
- Record: 45–37 (.549)
- Place: Division: 2nd (Central); Conference: 4th (Eastern)
- Playoff finish: Conference Semifinals (lost to Celtics 3–4)
- Stats at Basketball Reference

Local media
- Television: FSN Ohio; WUAB
- Radio: WTAM

The 2007–08 Cleveland Cavaliers season was the 38th season of NBA basketball in Cleveland, Ohio. The Cavaliers were the defending Eastern Conference champions, and were coming off of an NBA Finals defeat to the San Antonio Spurs, where they were swept in four games.

In the playoffs, the Cavaliers defeated the Washington Wizards in the First Round in six games, advancing to the Semifinals, where they would lose in seven games to the eventual NBA champion, the Boston Celtics.

== Key dates ==
- On June 28, the 2007 NBA draft took place in New York City.
- On July 1, the free agency period started.
- On October 9, the Cavaliers' pre-season began with a 62–81 loss to Washington Wizards.
- On October 31, the Cavaliers' season started with a 74–92 loss to the Dallas Mavericks.
- On November 2, the Cavaliers signed Sasha Pavlović to a multi-year extension.
- On November 2, the Cavaliers defeated the New York Knicks 110–106 for their first win.
- On November 27, the Cavaliers handed the Boston Celtics their second loss of the season.
- On December 5, the Cavaliers matched the offer sheet of the Charlotte Bobcats to retain Anderson Varejão and waived Demetris Nichols.
- On January 17, the Cavaliers defeated the San Antonio Spurs in San Antonio for the second straight year.
- On January 23, a victory over the Washington Wizards gave the Cavaliers a season-long five-game win streak.
- On February 21, in a three-team trade, the Cavaliers acquired Ben Wallace, Joe Smith, a 2009 second-round pick from the Chicago Bulls, and a trade exception, plus Wally Szczerbiak and Delonte West from the Seattle SuperSonics.
- On March 5, LeBron James scored 50 points against the New York Knicks which led to victory.
- On March 10, an 88–80 victory over the Portland Trail Blazers put the Cavaliers a season-high 10 games over 0.500.
- On May 2, the Cavaliers defeated the Washington Wizards 105–88 to advance to the second round of the NBA Playoffs.
- On May 18, the Cavaliers fell to the Boston Celtics 92–97 in Game 7 of the Eastern Conference semifinals.

== Draft picks ==
Cleveland did not have a draft pick in the 2007 NBA Draft due to trades from previous seasons.

- 1st round pick (#22) acquired from Toronto and traded to Charlotte as part of Sasha Pavlović deal. Used to draft Jared Dudley.
- 1st round pick (#24) traded to Boston and then to Phoenix as part of Jiří Welsch deal. Used to draft Rudy Fernández.
- 2nd round pick (#54) traded to Orlando and then to Houston as part of Drew Gooden deal. Used to draft Brad Newley.

== Roster ==
2007–08 Cleveland Cavaliers roster
Players

Pos.	No.	Player	Height	Weight	DOB	From
C	41	Lance Allred	6 ft 11 in (2.11 m)	250 lb (113 kg)	1981-02-02	Weber State
SG	33	Devin Brown	6 ft 5 in (1.96 m)	210 lb (95 kg)	1978-12-30	Texas–San Antonio
PG	1	Daniel Gibson	6 ft 2 in (1.88 m)	190 lb (86 kg)	1986-02-27	Texas
C	11	Žydrūnas Ilgauskas	7 ft 3 in (2.21 m)	260 lb (118 kg)	1975-06-05	Lithuania
SF	23	LeBron James	6 ft 8 in (2.03 m)	240 lb (109 kg)	1984-12-30	St. Vincent–St. Mary HS (OH)
SG	19	Damon Jones	6 ft 3 in (1.91 m)	190 lb (86 kg)	1976-08-25	Houston
PF	27	Dwayne Jones	6 ft 11 in (2.11 m)	251 lb (114 kg)	1983-06-09	Saint Joseph's
SG	3	Sasha Pavlović	6 ft 7 in (2.01 m)	210 lb (95 kg)	1983-11-15	Serbia
PF	32	Joe Smith	6 ft 10 in (2.08 m)	225 lb (102 kg)	1975-07-26	Maryland
PG	20	Eric Snow	6 ft 3 in (1.91 m)	205 lb (93 kg)	1973-04-24	Michigan State
SF	10	Wally Szczerbiak	6 ft 7 in (2.01 m)	244 lb (111 kg)	1977-03-05	Miami (OH)
SF	12	Billy Thomas	6 ft 5 in (1.96 m)	220 lb (100 kg)	1975-12-23	Kansas
C	17	Anderson Varejão	6 ft 10 in (2.08 m)	240 lb (109 kg)	1982-09-28	Brazil
F/C	4	Ben Wallace	6 ft 9 in (2.06 m)	240 lb (109 kg)	1974-09-10	Virginia Union
PG	13	Delonte West	6 ft 3 in (1.91 m)	180 lb (82 kg)	1983-07-26	Saint Joseph's

Coaches
Head coach
- Mike Brown
Assistant(s)
- Hank Egan
- Melvin Hunt
- Chris Jent
- John Kuester
- Michael Malone

Legend
- (DP) Unsigned draft pick
- (FA) Free agent
- (S) Suspended
- Injured

Roster
Updated: March 13, 2008

== Regular season ==
=== Season standings ===
Central Division	W	L	PCT	GB	Home	Road	Div
y-Detroit Pistons	59	23	.732	–	34–7	25–16	11–5
x-Cleveland Cavaliers	45	37	.549	14	27–14	18–23	7–9
Indiana Pacers	36	46	.439	23	21–20	15–26	5–11
Chicago Bulls	33	49	.402	26	20–21	13–28	11–5
Milwaukee Bucks	26	56	.317	33	19–22	7–34	6–10

Eastern Conference
#	Team	W	L	PCT	GB
1	z-Boston Celtics	66	16	.805	–
2	y-Detroit Pistons	59	23	.732	7
3	y-Orlando Magic	52	30	.634	14
4	x-Cleveland Cavaliers	45	37	.549	21
5	x-Washington Wizards	43	39	.524	23
6	x-Toronto Raptors	41	41	.500	25
7	x-Philadelphia 76ers	40	42	.488	26
8	x-Atlanta Hawks	37	45	.451	29
9	Indiana Pacers	36	46	.439	30
10	New Jersey Nets	34	48	.415	32
11	Chicago Bulls	33	49	.402	33
12	Charlotte Bobcats	32	50	.390	34
13	Milwaukee Bucks	26	56	.317	40
14	New York Knicks	23	59	.280	43
15	Miami Heat	15	67	.183	51

=== Game log ===
2007–08 game log
Total: 45–37 (home: 27–14; road: 18–23)
October: 0–1 (home: 0–1; road: 0–0)

Game	Date	Team	Score	High points	High rebounds	High assists	Location Attendance	Record
1	October 31	Dallas	L 74–92	Zydrunas Ilgauskas (17)	Zydrunas Ilgauskas (18)	LeBron James, Daniel Gibson (4)	Quicken Loans Arena; 20,562	0–1

November : 8–8 (home: 4–2; road: 4–6)

Game	Date	Team	Score	High points	High rebounds	High assists	Location Attendance	Record
2	November 2	New York	W 110–106	LeBron James (45)	Zydrunas Ilgauskas (12)	LeBron James (7)	Quicken Loans Arena; 20,562	1–1
3	November 4	@ Phoenix	L 92–103	LeBron James (27)	Drew Gooden (14)	LeBron James (8)	US Airways Center; 18,422	1–2
4	November 6	@ Golden State	W 108–104	LeBron James (24)	Zydrunas Ilgauskas (14)	LeBron James (9)	Oracle Arena; 19,596	2–2
5	November 7	@ Utah	L 101–103	LeBron James (32)	LeBron James (15)	LeBron James (13)	EnergySolutions Arena; 19,911	2–3
6	November 9	@ Sacramento	W 93–91	LeBron James (26)	Zydrunas Ilgauskas (15)	LeBron James (4)	ARCO Arena; 15,293	3–3
7	November 11	@ L. A. Clippers	W 103–95	Zydrunas Ilgauskas (25)	Drew Gooden (16)	LeBron James (8)	STAPLES Center; 15,541	4–3
8	November 12	@ Denver	L 100–122	LeBron James (27)	Dwayne Jones (10)	LeBron James (4)	Pepsi Center; 19,155	4–4
9	November 14	Orlando	L 116–117 (OT)	LeBron James (39)	LeBron James (13)	LeBron James (14)	Quicken Loans Arena; 20,562	4–5
10	November 16	Utah	W 99–94	LeBron James (40)	Zydrunas Ilgauskas (12)	LeBron James (9)	Quicken Loans Arena; 19,862	5–5
11	November 20	Milwaukee	L 107–111	LeBron James (34)	Drew Gooden (13)	LeBron James (7)	Quicken Loans Arena; 20,115	5–6
12	November 21	@ Minnesota	W 97–86	LeBron James (45)	Zydrunas Ilgauskas, Dwayne Jones (10)	LeBron James, Daniel Gibson (5)	Target Center; 15,224	6–6
13	November 24	Toronto	W 111–108	LeBron James (37)	Zydrunas Ilgauskas (15)	LeBron James (12)	Quicken Loans Arena; 20,018	7–6
14	November 25	@ Indiana	W 111–106	LeBron James (30)	Drew Gooden (12)	LeBron James (10)	Conseco Fieldhouse; 11,603	8–6
15	November 27	Boston	W 109–104 (OT)	LeBron James (38)	Zydrunas Ilgauskas (15)	LeBron James (13)	Quicken Loans Arena; 20,562	9–6
16	November 28	@ Detroit	L 74–109	LeBron James (15)	Drew Gooden (9)	LeBron James (3)	The Palace of Auburn Hills; 22,076	9–7
17	November 30	@ Toronto	L 82–91	Daniel Gibson (24)	Drew Gooden (14)	Daniel Gibson (7)	Air Canada Centre; 19,800	9–8

December : 5–9 (home: 4–3; road: 1–6)

Game	Date	Team	Score	High points	High rebounds	High assists	Location Attendance	Record
18	December 2	@ Boston	L 70–80	Zydrunas Ilgauskas (12)	Zydrunas Ilgauskas (13)	Zydrunas Ilgauskas, Dwayne Jones, Eric Snow, Damon Jones, Devin Brown (2)	TD Garden; 18,624	9–9
19	December 4	New Jersey	L 79–100	Shannon Brown (20)	Dwayne Jones (12)	Daniel Gibson, Shannon Brown (4)	Quicken Loans Arena; 19,838	9–10
20	December 5	@ Washington	L 86–105	Daniel Gibson, Drew Gooden, Shannon Brown (13)	Zydrunas Ilgauskas (10)	Daniel Gibson (8)	Verizon Center; 17,684	9–11
21	December 8	@ Charlotte	L 93–96	Larry Hughes (22)	Drew Gooden (9)	Daniel Gibson, Shannon Brown (3)	Charlotte Bobcats Arena; 17,624	9–12
22	December 11	Indiana	W 118–105	Larry Hughes (36)	Drew Gooden (11)	LeBron James, Eric Snow (5)	Quicken Loans Arena; 20,010	10–12
23	December 14	@ New Jersey	L 97–105	LeBron James (29)	Zydrunas Ilgauskas (12)	LeBron James (8)	Izod Center; 15,242	10–13
24	December 15	Philadelphia	L 86–92	LeBron James, Drew Gooden (21)	Drew Gooden (10)	LeBron James, Eric Snow (6)	Quicken Loans Arena; 20,562	10–14
25	December 17	Milwaukee	W 104–99 (2OT)	LeBron James (31)	Zydrunas Ilgauskas (11)	Devin Brown (6)	Quicken Loans Arena; 20,562	11–14
26	December 19	@ New York	L 90–108	LeBron James (32)	LeBron James (8)	LeBron James (6)	Madison Square Garden; 18,704	11–15
27	December 20	L. A. Lakers	W 94–90	LeBron James (33)	Anderson Varejao (15)	LeBron James (5)	Quicken Loans Arena; 20,562	12–15
28	December 23	Golden State	L 96–105	LeBron James (25)	Anderson Varejao (11)	LeBron James (8)	Quicken Loans Arena; 20,562	12–16
29	December 25	Miami	W 96–82	LeBron James (25)	Drew Gooden (9)	LeBron James (12)	Quicken Loans Arena; 20,562	13–16
30	December 27	@ Dallas	W 88–81	LeBron James (24)	Zydrunas Ilgauskas (11)	LeBron James (7)	American Airlines Center; 20,462	14–16
31	December 29	@ New Orleans	L 76–86	LeBron James (21)	Zydrunas Ilgauskas (12)	LeBron James (6)	New Orleans Arena; 17,623	14–17

January : 8–3 (home: 5–1; road: 3–2)

Game	Date	Team	Score	High points	High rebounds	High assists	Location Attendance	Record
32	January 2	Atlanta	W 98–94	LeBron James (36)	Anderson Varejao (11)	LeBron James (6)	Quicken Loans Arena; 20,562	15–17
33	January 4	Sacramento	W 97–93	LeBron James (24)	Zydrunas Ilgauskas (15)	LeBron James (10)	Quicken Loans Arena; 20,562	16–17
34	January 6	@ Toronto	W 93–90	LeBron James (39)	Anderson Varejao (13)	LeBron James (8)	Air Canada Centre; 19,800	17–17
35	January 8	Seattle	W 95–79	LeBron James (22)	Anderson Varejao, Zydrunas Ilgauskas (9)	Zydrunas Ilgauskas (4)	Quicken Loans Arena; 20,409	18–17
36	January 9	@ Atlanta	L 81–90	LeBron James (31)	Drew Gooden (11)	LeBron James (6)	Philips Arena; 16,246	18–18
37	January 11	Charlotte	W 113–106 (2OT)	LeBron James (31)	LeBron James (19)	LeBron James (8)	Quicken Loans Arena; 20,562	19–18
38	January 15	@ Memphis	W 132–124 (OT)	LeBron James (51)	Drew Gooden (11)	LeBron James (9)	FedEx Forum; 13,871	20–18
39	January 17	@ San Antonio	W 90–88	LeBron James (27)	Anderson Varejao (14)	LeBron James (7)	AT&T Center; 18,482	21–18
40	January 21	@ Miami	W 97–90	LeBron James (28)	Zydrunas Ilgauskas (11)	LeBron James (5)	AmericanAirlines Arena; 19,600	22–18
41	January 23	Washington	W 121–85	Zydrunas Ilgauskas (24)	Drew Gooden (10)	LeBron James (8)	Quicken Loans Arena; 20,562	23–18
42	January 25	Phoenix	L 108–110	LeBron James (36)	Zydrunas Ilgauskas (10)	LeBron James, Daniel Gibson (5)	Quicken Loans Arena; 20,562	23–19
43	January 27	@ L. A. Lakers	W 98–95	LeBron James (41)	Zydrunas Ilgauskas (11)	LeBron James, Larry Hughes (4)	STAPLES Center; 18,997	24–19
44	January 30	@ Portland	W 84–83	LeBron James (37)	LeBron James (14)	LeBron James (4)	Rose Garden Arena; 20,501	25–19
45	January 31	@ Seattle	L 95–101	Larry Hughes (28)	Zydrunas Ilgauskas (9)	Daniel Gibson (6)	KeyArena; 13,109	25–20

February : 8–6 (home: 5–3; road: 3–3)

Game	Date	Team	Score	High points	High rebounds	High assists	Location Attendance	Record
46	February 2	L. A. Clippers	W 98–84	LeBron James (28)	Zydrunas Ilgauskas (13)	LeBron James (7)	Quicken Loans Arena; 20,562	26–20
47	February 5	Boston	W 114–113	LeBron James (33)	Zydrunas Ilgauskas (10)	LeBron James (12)	Quicken Loans Arena; 20,562	27–20
48	February 7	@ Houston	L 77–92	LeBron James (32)	Zydrunas Ilgauskas (8)	LeBron James (6)	Toyota Center; 18,402	27–21
49	February 8	@ Atlanta	W 100–95	LeBron James (26)	LeBron James, Zydrunas Ilgauskas (11)	LeBron James (7)	Philips Arena; 19,335	28–21
50	February 10	Denver	L 83–110	LeBron James (30)	Zydrunas Ilgauskas (10)	LeBron James, Devin Brown, Damon Jones, Eric Snow (3)	Quicken Loans Arena; 20,562	28–22
51	February 11	@ Orlando	W 118–111	Larry Hughes (40)	LeBron James, Donyell Marshall (7)	LeBron James (10)	Amway Arena; 17,519	29–22
52	February 13	San Antonio	L 105–112	LeBron James (39)	Drew Gooden (11)	LeBron James (9)	Quicken Loans Arena; 20,562	29–23
All-Star Break
53	February 19	Houston	L 85–93	LeBron James (26)	LeBron James (13)	LeBron James (11)	Quicken Loans Arena; 20,562	29–24
54	February 20	@ Indiana	W 106–97	LeBron James (31)	Zydrunas Ilgauskas (17)	LeBron James (12)	Conseco Fieldhouse; 13,096	30–24
55	February 22	Washington	W 90–89	LeBron James (33)	LeBron James (15)	LeBron James (8)	Quicken Loans Arena; 20,562	31–24
56	February 24	Memphis	W 109–89	LeBron James (25)	Zydrunas Ilgauskas (13)	LeBron James (11)	Quicken Loans Arena; 20,562	32–24
57	February 26	@ Milwaukee	L 102–105	LeBron James (35)	Ben Wallace (11)	Delonte West (7)	Bradley Center; 15,346	32–25
58	February 27	@ Boston	L 87–92	LeBron James (26)	Zydrunas Ilgauskas (12)	LeBron James (4)	TD Garden; 18,624	32–26
59	February 29	Minnesota	W 92–84	LeBron James (30)	Ben Wallace (9)	Delonte West (13)	Quicken Loans Arena; 20,562	33–26

March : 8–7 (home: 7–1; road: 1–6)

Game	Date	Team	Score	High points	High rebounds	High assists	Location Attendance	Record
60	March 2	Chicago	W 95–86	LeBron James (37)	Ben Wallace, Anderson Varejao (8)	LeBron James (6)	Quicken Loans Arena; 20,562	34–26
61	March 5	@ New York	W 119–105	LeBron James (50)	Joe Smith (11)	LeBron James (10)	Madison Square Garden; 18,760	35–26
62	March 6	@ Chicago	L 96–107	LeBron James (39)	Anderson Varejao, Ben Wallace (10)	Devin Brown (4)	United Center; 22,097	35–27
63	March 8	Indiana	W 103–95	LeBron James (38)	Anderson Varejao (16)	Anderson Varejao, Delonte West (6)	Quicken Loans Arena; 20,562	36–27
64	March 10	Portland	W 88–80	LeBron James (24)	LeBron James (10)	LeBron James (11)	Quicken Loans Arena; 20,213	37–27
65	March 12	@ New Jersey	L 99–104	LeBron James (42)	LeBron James (11)	LeBron James (7)	Izod Center; 18,287	37–28
66	March 13	@ Washington	L 99–101	LeBron James (25)	Anderson Varejao (12)	LeBron James, Delonte West (7)	Verizon Center; 20,173	37–29
67	March 16	Charlotte	W 98–91	LeBron James (33)	Ben Wallace (15)	LeBron James (10)	Quicken Loans Arena; 20,562	38–29
68	March 17	@ Orlando	L 90–104	LeBron James (30)	LeBron James (9)	LeBron James (6)	Amway Arena; 17,519	38–30
69	March 19	Detroit	W 89–73	LeBron James (30)	Zydrunas Ilgauskas, Ben Wallace (8)	LeBron James, Delonte West (6)	Quicken Loans Arena; 20,562	39–30
70	March 21	Toronto	W 90–83	LeBron James (29)	LeBron James (12)	Damon Jones (7)	Quicken Loans Arena; 20,562	40–30
71	March 22	@ Milwaukee	L 98–108	LeBron James (29)	LeBron James, Anderson Varejao (11)	LeBron James, Wally Szczerbiak, Damon Jones (4)	Bradley Center; 15,337	40–31
72	March 26	New Orleans	L 99–100	Zydrunas Ilgauskas (29)	Zydrunas Ilgauskas, Anderson Varejao (15)	LeBron James (8)	Quicken Loans Arena; 20,562	40–32
73	March 29	@ Detroit	L 71–85	LeBron James (13)	Anderson Varejao (9)	Damon Jones (6)	The Palace of Auburn Hills; 22,076	40–33
74	March 30	Philadelphia	W 91–88	LeBron James (26)	LeBron James (9)	Delonte West (11)	Quicken Loans Arena; 20,562	41–33

April : 4–4 (home: 2–3; road: 2–1)

Game	Date	Team	Score	High points	High rebounds	High assists	Location Attendance	Record
75	April 2	@ Charlotte	W 118–114	LeBron James (29)	Zydrunas Ilgauskas, Anderson Varejao (12)	Devin Brown (8)	Charlotte Bobcats Arena; 15,106	42–33
76	April 3	Chicago	L 98–101	LeBron James (33)	Wally Szczerbiak, Ben Wallace (8)	Devin Brown, Delonte West (5)	Quicken Loans Arena; 20,562	42–34
77	April 5	Orlando	L 86–101	Delonte West (19)	Zydrunas Ilgauskas, Ben Wallace (9)	LeBron James (9)	Quicken Loans Arena; 20,562	42–35
78	April 9	New Jersey	W 104–83	LeBron James (33)	Anderson Varejao (9)	LeBron James (8)	Quicken Loans Arena; 20,063	43–35
79	April 11	@ Chicago	L 95–100	LeBron James (34)	Anderson Varejao (8)	Delonte West (6)	United Center; 22,084	43–36
80	April 13	Miami	W 84–76	Delonte West (18)	Zydrunas Ilgauskas (14)	LeBron James (7)	Quicken Loans Arena; 20,562	44–36
81	April 14	@ Philadelphia	W 91–90	LeBron James (27)	Anderson Varejao (8)	LeBron James (5)	Wachovia Center; 20,730	45–36
82	April 16	Detroit	L 74–84	Wally Szczerbiak (18)	Dwayne Jones (10)	Delonte West (7)	Quicken Loans Arena; 20,562	45–37

2007–08 schedule

== Playoffs ==
2008 playoff game log
First Round: 4–2 (home: 2–1; road: 2–1)

Game	Date	Team	Score	High points	High rebounds	High assists	Location Attendance	Series
1	April 19	Washington	W 93–86	LeBron James (32)	Žydrūnas Ilgauskas (11)	Gibson, West (5)	Quicken Loans Arena; 20,562	1–0
2	April 21	Washington	W 116–86	LeBron James (30)	Ilgauskas, James (9)	LeBron James (12)	Quicken Loans Arena; 20,562	2–0
3	April 24	@ Washington	L 72–108	LeBron James (22)	Anderson Varejão (9)	three players tied (3)	Verizon Center; 20,173	2–1
4	April 27	@ Washington	W 100–97	LeBron James (34)	James, Wallace (12)	LeBron James (7)	Verizon Center; 20,173	3–1
5	April 30	Washington	L 87–88	LeBron James (34)	LeBron James (10)	Delonte West (8)	Quicken Loans Arena; 20,562	3–2
6	May 2	@ Washington	W 105–88	LeBron James (27)	LeBron James (13)	LeBron James (13)	Verizon Center; 20,173	4–2

Conference Semifinals: 3–4 (home: 3–0; road: 0–4)

Game	Date	Team	Score	High points	High rebounds	High assists	Location Attendance	Series
1	May 6	@ Boston	L 72–76	Žydrūnas Ilgauskas (22)	Žydrūnas Ilgauskas (12)	LeBron James (9)	TD Banknorth Garden; 18,624	0–1
2	May 8	@ Boston	L 73–89	LeBron James (21)	Anderson Varejão (10)	LeBron James (6)	TD Banknorth Garden; 18,624	0–2
3	May 10	Boston	W 108–84	James, West (21)	Ben Wallace (9)	LeBron James (8)	Quicken Loans Arena; 20,562	1–2
4	May 12	Boston	W 88–77	LeBron James (21)	Ilgauskas, Wallace (7)	LeBron James (13)	Quicken Loans Arena; 20,562	2–2
5	May 14	@ Boston	L 89–96	LeBron James (35)	Ilgauskas, Varejão (7)	LeBron James (5)	TD Banknorth Garden; 18,624	2–3
6	May 16	Boston	W 74–69	LeBron James (32)	LeBron James (12)	LeBron James (6)	Quicken Loans Arena; 20,562	3–3
7	May 18	@ Boston	L 92–97	LeBron James (45)	Joe Smith (6)	LeBron James (6)	TD Banknorth Garden; 18,624	3–4

2008 schedule

== Player stats ==
Legend
GP	Games played	GS	Games started	MPG	Minutes per game
FG%	Field-goal percentage	3P%	3-point field-goal percentage	FT%	Free-throw percentage
RPG	Rebounds per game	APG	Assists per game	SPG	Steals per game
BPG	Blocks per game	PPG	Points per game

=== Regular season ===
Player	GP	GS	MPG	FG%	3P%	FT%	RPG	APG	SPG	BPG	PPG
Lance Allred	3	0	3.3	.250	.000	.500	.3	.0	.00	.00	1.0
Devin Brown	78	20	22.6	.409	.308	.754	3.4	2.2	.67	.09	7.5
Kaniel Dickens	5	0	2.4	.333	.000	.000	.2	.2	.00	.20	.4
Daniel Gibson	58	26	30.4	.432	.440	.810	2.3	2.5	.81	.24	10.4
Žydrūnas Ilgauskas	73	73	30.4	.474	.000	.802	9.3	1.4	.47	1.64	14.1
LeBron James	75	74	40.4	.484	.315	.712	7.9	7.2	1.84	1.08	30.0
Damon Jones	67	3	19.9	.416	.417	.714	1.1	1.9	.28	.01	6.5
Dwayne Jones	56	0	8.4	.532	.000	.483	2.5	.2	.18	.45	1.4
Aleksandar Pavlović	51	45	23.3	.362	.298	.688	2.5	1.6	.57	.12	7.4
Joe Smith*	27	1	21.5	.512	.000	.652	5.0	.7	.33	.59	8.1
Eric Snow	22	5	13.9	.158	.000	.455	.9	1.9	.45	.18	1.0
Wally Szczerbiak*	25	1	22.2	.359	.365	.878	3.2	1.4	.36	.28	8.2
Billy Thomas*	7	0	4.9	.286	.308	.000	.3	.0	.14	.00	1.7
Anderson Varejão	48	13	27.5	.461	.000	.598	8.3	1.1	.77	.54	6.7
Ben Wallace*	22	22	26.3	.457	.000	.432	7.4	.6	.86	1.68	4.2
Delonte West*	26	26	31.0	.440	.367	.788	3.7	4.5	1.12	.73	10.3

*Statistics include only games with the Cavaliers

=== Playoffs ===
Player	GP	GS	MPG	FG%	3P%	FT%	RPG	APG	SPG	BPG	PPG
Devin Brown	8	0	11.5	.265	.294	.667	2.4	1.1	.25	.00	4.1
Daniel Gibson	11	0	25.8	.449	.452	.714	1.7	2.5	.64	.18	9.0
Žydrūnas Ilgauskas	13	13	30.2	.479	.000	.818	7.5	1.6	.38	1.08	13.1
LeBron James	13	13	42.5	.411	.257	.731	7.8	7.6	1.77	1.31	28.2
Damon Jones	5	0	5.2	.200	.286	.000	.0	.2	.00	.00	1.2
Dwayne Jones	5	0	4.0	.500	.000	.500	1.2	.0	.00	.20	.6
Aleksandar Pavlović	8	0	13.9	.385	.444	.667	1.3	.1	.25	.00	3.5
Joe Smith	13	0	20.2	.486	.000	.636	4.6	.5	.38	.54	6.6
Wally Szczerbiak	13	13	28.8	.376	.323	.929	1.8	1.5	.15	.08	10.8
Billy Thomas	3	0	2.7	.500	.500	.000	.3	.3	.33	.00	1.0
Anderson Varejão	13	0	18.5	.407	.000	.429	5.2	.7	.62	.08	4.1
Ben Wallace	13	13	23.4	.515	.000	.350	6.5	1.2	.62	1.08	3.2
Delonte West	13	13	34.8	.400	.429	.854	3.3	4.2	1.15	.46	10.8

== Awards, records and milestones ==
=== Awards ===
- LeBron James was named the Eastern Conference Player of the Week for games played from November 19 through November 25.
- LeBron James was named the Eastern Conference Player of the Week for games played December 31, 2007 through January 6, 2008.
- LeBron James was named the Eastern Conference Player of the Month for January 2008.
- Mike Brown was named the Eastern Conference Coach of the Month for January 2008.
- Daniel Gibson, 33 points, was named the MVP of the Rookie Challenge Game during NBA All-Star Week on February 15, 2008.
- LeBron James, 27 points, 9 assists, 8 rebounds, was named the MVP of the NBA All-Star Game during NBA All-Star week on February 17, 2008.
- LeBron James was named the Eastern Conference Player of the Week for games played from February 18 through February 24.
- LeBron James was named the Eastern Conference Player of the Month for February 2008.

=== Milestones ===
- On December 17, 2007 LeBron James became the youngest NBA player to score 9,000 points.
- On February 11, 2008 Drew Gooden grabbed his 2,500th rebound as a Cavalier. Gooden is the 9th Cavalier to reach that milestone.
- On February 11, 2008 Larry Hughes scored his 2,000th point as a Cavalier. Hughes is the 44th Cavalier to reach that milestone.
- On February 13, 2008 Žydrūnas Ilgauskas blocked his 1,100th shot as a Cavalier. Ilgauskas is the 2nd Cavalier to reach that milestone.
- On February 20, 2008 Zydrunas Ilgauskas scored his 9,000th point as a Cavalier. Ilgauskas is the 6th Cavalier to reach that milestone.
- On February 20, 2008 LeBron James played his 15,000th minute as a Cavalier. James is the 8th Cavalier to reach that milestone.
- On February 22, 2008 Zydrunas Ilgauskas grabbed his 2,000th offensive rebound as a Cavalier. Ilgauskas is the team leader in offensive rebounds.
- On February 22, 2008 Damon Jones hit is 300th three pointer as a Cavalier. Jones is the 6th Cavalier to reach that milestone.
- On February 22, 2008 LeBron James grabbed his 2,500th rebound as a Cavalier. James is the 10th Cavalier to reach that milestone.
- On February 27, 2008 LeBron James became the youngest NBA player to score 10,000 points.
- On March 19, 2008 LeBron James dished his 2,500th assist as a Cavalier. James is the 2nd Cavalier to reach that milestone.
- On March 26, 2008 Žydrūnas Ilgauskas grabbed his 5,000th rebound as a Cavalier. Ilgauskas is the 2nd Cavalier to reach that milestone.
- On March 29, 2008 LeBron James made his 500th three point shot as a Cavalier. James is the 4th Cavalier to reach that milestone.

=== All-Star ===
- Daniel Gibson participated in the 2008 Rookie Challenge Game on February 15, 2008, and was named the MVP.
- Daniel Gibson participated in the 2008 Three Point Contest on February 16, 2008, and finished in second place.
- LeBron James started the 2008 All-Star Game on February 17, 2008, and was named the MVP.

== Transactions ==
The Cavaliers have been involved in the following transactions during the 2007–08 season.

=== Trades ===
February 21, 2008	To Cleveland Cavaliers ----Ben Wallace, Wally Szczerbiak, Joe Smith, Delonte West, a 2009 second round pick and a $1.7 mil trade exception	To Chicago Bulls ----Larry Hughes, Drew Gooden, Cedric Simmons and Shannon Brown.	To Seattle SuperSonics ----Ira Newble, Donyell Marshall and Adrian Griffin.

^{*}Note: This is the largest trade in Cleveland Cavaliers history.

=== Free agents ===
Player	Former team
Sasha Pavlović	Cleveland Cavaliers
Anderson Varejão	Cleveland Cavaliers
Billy Thomas	Colorado 14ers
Kaniel Dickens	Colorado 14ers
Lance Allred	Idaho Stampede

Player	New team
Demetris Nichols	Chicago Bulls

== See also ==
- 2007–08 NBA season
