= 2007–08 Washington Wizards season =

NBA professional basketball team season

- Head coach: Eddie Jordan
- Owners: Raul Fernandez, Abe Pollin
- Arena: Verizon Center

Results
- Record: 43–39 (.524)
- Place: Division: 2nd (Southeast); Conference: 5th (Eastern)
- Playoff finish: First Round (lost to Cavaliers 2–4)
- Stats at Basketball Reference

Local media
- Television: CSN Mid-Atlantic, The CW Washington, News Channel 8
- Radio: ESPN 980

The 2007–08 Washington Wizards season was their 47th season in the National Basketball Association. The Wizards made the playoffs for the fourth straight season despite missing star Gilbert Arenas for most of it due to a knee injury. The Wizards were then eliminated for the third straight time by the Cavaliers, all in just the first round.

Key dates prior to the start of the season:

- The 2007 NBA draft took place in New York City on June 28.
- The free agency period begins in July.

== Draft picks ==
Washington's selections from the 2007 NBA draft in New York City.

Round	Pick	Player	Position	Nationality	School/Club team
1	16	Nick Young	Guard	United States	USC
2	47	Dominic McGuire	Small forward	United States	Fresno State

== Roster ==
2007–08 Washington Wizards roster
Players

Pos.	No.	Player	Height	Weight	DOB	From
PG	0	Gilbert Arenas	6 ft 4 in (1.93 m)	215 lb (98 kg)	1982–01–06	Arizona
PF	32	Andray Blatche	6 ft 11 in (2.11 m)	248 lb (112 kg)	1986–08–22	South Kent School (CT)
SF	3	Caron Butler	6 ft 7 in (2.01 m)	228 lb (103 kg)	1980–03–13	Connecticut
PG	6	Antonio Daniels	6 ft 4 in (1.93 m)	205 lb (93 kg)	1975–03–19	Bowling Green
C	33	Brendan Haywood	7 ft 0 in (2.13 m)	263 lb (119 kg)	1979–11–27	North Carolina
PF	4	Antawn Jamison	6 ft 9 in (2.06 m)	235 lb (107 kg)	1976–06–12	North Carolina
PG	8	Roger Mason	6 ft 5 in (1.96 m)	212 lb (96 kg)	1980–09–10	Virginia
SG	5	Dominic McGuire	6 ft 8 in (2.03 m)	210 lb (95 kg)	1985–10–20	Fresno State
C	14	Oleksiy Pecherov	7 ft 0 in (2.13 m)	230 lb (104 kg)	1985–12–08	Ukraine
C	9	Darius Songaila	6 ft 9 in (2.06 m)	248 lb (112 kg)	1978–02–14	Wake Forest
SG	2	DeShawn Stevenson	6 ft 5 in (1.96 m)	218 lb (99 kg)	1981–04–03	Washington Union HS (CA)
C	36	Etan Thomas	6 ft 10 in (2.08 m)	260 lb (118 kg)	1978–04–01	Syracuse
SG	1	Nick Young	6 ft 6 in (1.98 m)	200 lb (91 kg)	1988–06–01	USC

Coaches
Head coach
- Eddie Jordan
Assistant(s)
- Mike O'Koren
- Phil Hubbard
- Wes Unseld Jr.
- Randy Ayers

Legend
- (DP) Unsigned draft pick
- (FA) Free agent
- (S) Suspended
- Injured

Roster
Updated: 2007-12-31

== Standings ==
=== Standings ===
Southeast Division	W	L	PCT	GB	Home	Road	Div
y-Orlando Magic	52	30	.634	–	25–16	27–14	12–4
x-Washington Wizards	43	39	.500	9	25–16	18–23	10–6
x-Atlanta Hawks	37	45	.451	15	25–16	12–29	9–7
Charlotte Bobcats	32	50	.390	20	21–20	11–30	7–9
Miami Heat	15	67	.183	37	9–32	6–35	2–14

Eastern Conference
#	Team	W	L	PCT	GB
1	z-Boston Celtics	66	16	.805	–
2	y-Detroit Pistons	59	23	.732	7
3	y-Orlando Magic	52	30	.634	14
4	x-Cleveland Cavaliers	45	37	.549	21
5	x-Washington Wizards	43	39	.524	23
6	x-Toronto Raptors	41	41	.500	25
7	x-Philadelphia 76ers	40	42	.488	26
8	x-Atlanta Hawks	37	45	.451	29
9	Indiana Pacers	36	46	.439	30
10	New Jersey Nets	34	48	.415	32
11	Chicago Bulls	33	49	.402	33
12	Charlotte Bobcats	32	50	.390	34
13	Milwaukee Bucks	26	56	.317	40
14	New York Knicks	23	59	.280	43
15	Miami Heat	15	67	.183	51

=== Game log ===
==== October ====
Record: 0–1; home: 0–0; road: 0–1

#	Date	Visitor	Score	Home	OT	Leading scorer	Attendance	Record
1	October 31, 2007	Wizards	119–110	Pacers	1	Gilbert Arenas (34)	16,212	0–1

==== November ====
Record: 7–8; home: 3–3; road: 4–5

#	Date	Visitor	Score	Home	OT	Leading scorer	Attendance	Record
2	November 2, 2007	Wizards	103–83	Celtics	NA	Gilbert Arenas (21)	18,624	0–2
3	November 3, 2007	Magic	94–82	Wizards	NA	Caron Butler (23)	20,173	0–3
4	November 8, 2007	Wizards	85–87	Nets	NA	Antawn Jamison (24)	13,267	0–4
5	November 9, 2007	Nuggets	118–92	Wizards	NA	Caron Butler (21)	20,173	0–5
6	November 11, 2007	Wizards	101–90	Hawks	NA	Caron Butler (24)	13,172	1–5
7	November 14, 2007	Pacers	90–103	Wizards	NA	Gilbert Arenas (30)	12,477	2–5
8	November 16, 2007	Wizards	105–89	Timberwolves	NA	Caron Butler (29)	11,783	3–5
9	November 17, 2007	Trail Blazers	109–90	Wizards	NA	Antawn Jamison (30)	20,173	4–5
10	November 20, 2007	Sixers	101–116	Wizards	NA	Andray Blatche (26)	12,299	5–5
11	November 21, 2007	Wizards	114–111	Bobcats	1	Caron Butler (39)	12,193	6–5
12	November 23, 2007	Warriors	123–115	Wizards	NA	Antawn Jamison (30)	20,173	6–6
13	November 24, 2007	Wizards	118–124	Grizzlies	NA	Antawn Jamison (41)	13,579	6–7
14	November 26, 2007	Wizards	110–98	Mavericks	NA	Caron Butler (35)	19,556	7–7
15	November 28, 2007	Wizards	94–109	Spurs	NA	Brendan Haywood (19)	18,386	7–8
16	November 30, 2007	Wizards	84–85	Sixers	NA	Caron Butler (20)	10,718	7–9

==== December ====
Record: 8–5; home: 6–3; road: 2–2

#	Date	Visitor	Score	Home	OT	Leading scorer	Attendance	Record
17	December 1, 2007	Raptors	97–101	Wizards	NA	Caron Butler (29)	20,173	8–9
18	December 5, 2007	Cavaliers	86–105	Wizards	NA	Caron Butler (27)	17,684	9–9
19	December 7, 2007	Suns	122–107	Wizards	NA	Andray Blatche (19)	20,173	9–10
20	December 9, 2007	Nets	89–104	Wizards	NA	Caron Butler (28)	13,712	10–10
21	December 11, 2007	Timberwolves	88–102	Wizards	NA	Antawn Jamison (22)	12,177	11–10
22	December 13, 2007	Wizards	104–91	Heat	NA	DeShawn Stevenson (26)	19,600	12–10
23	December 15, 2007	Kings	79–92	Wizards	NA	DeShawn Stevenson (19)	20,173	13–10
24	December 19, 2007	Bulls	95–84	Wizards	NA	Caron Butler (29)	14,792	13–11
25	December 21, 2007	Hawks	97–92	Wizards	NA	Antawn Jamison (30)	16,472	13–12
26	December 22, 2007	Wizards	85–93	Pacers	NA	Antawn Jamison (29)	11,583	13–13
27	December 26, 2007	Wizards	108–104	Bobcats	NA	Antawn Jamison (26)	14,705	14–13
28	December 28, 2007	Wizards	106–109	Nets	NA	Caron Butler (28)	17,644	14–14
29	December 29, 2007	Heat	74–96	Wizards	NA	Andray Blatche (18)	20,173	15–14

==== January ====
Record: 9–6; home: 6–2; road: 3–4

#	Date	Visitor	Score	Home	OT	Leading scorer	Attendance	Record
30	January 2, 2008	Pistons	106–93	Wizards	NA	Caron Butler (22)	15,763	15–15
31	January 4, 2008	Wizards	101–77	Bucks	NA	Antawn Jamison (24)	16,250	16–15
32	January 6, 2008	SuperSonics	86–108	Wizards	NA	Caron Butler (33)	17,816	17–15
33	January 8, 2008	Rockets	92–84	Wizards	NA	Antawn Jamison (14)	16,824	17–16
34	January 11, 2008	Wizards	102–98	Hawks	1	Antawn Jamison (22)	16,064	18–16
35	January 12, 2008	Celtics	78–85	Wizards	NA	DeShawn Stevenson (19)	20,173	19–16
36	January 14, 2008	Wizards	88–83	Celtics	NA	Caron Butler (21)	18,624	20–16
37	January 15, 2008	Wizards	93–105	Knicks	NA	Caron Butler (24)	17,584	20–17
38	January 18, 2008	Knicks	98–111	Wizards	NA	Antawn Jamison (32)	20,173	21–17
39	January 21, 2008	Mavericks	84–102	Wizards	NA	Caron Butler (24)	20,173	22–17
40	January 23, 2008	Wizards	85–121	Cavaliers	NA	Brendan Haywood (11)	20,562	22–18
41	January 25, 2008	Grizzlies	93–104	Wizards	NA	Antawn Jamison (24)	17,123	23–18
42	January 27, 2008	Wizards	102–105	Bucks	1	Caron Butler (40)	15,621	23–19
43	January 29, 2008	Raptors	104–108	Wizards	1	Antawn Jamison (24)	12,905	24–19
44	January 30, 2008	Wizards	83–122	Raptors	NA	DeShawn Stevenson (16)	19,800	24–20

==== February ====
Record: 4–10; home: 1–4; road: 3–6

#	Date	Visitor	Score	Home	OT	Leading scorer	Attendance	Record
45	February 1, 2008	Jazz	96–87	Wizards	NA	Antawn Jamison (31)	20,173	24–21
46	February 3, 2008	Lakers	103–91	Wizards	NA	Antawn Jamison (21)	20,173	24–22
47	February 5, 2008	Wizards	96–101	Sixers	NA	DeShawn Stevenson (19)	10,974	24–23
48	February 6, 2008	Spurs	85–77	Wizards	NA	Antawn Jamison (18)	20,173	24–24
49	February 8, 2008	Wizards	100–111	Nuggets	NA	Antawn Jamison (21)	17,078	24–25
50	February 10, 2008	Wizards	107–108	Suns	NA	Antawn Jamison (28)	18,422	24–26
51	February 11, 2008	Wizards	117–120	Warriors	NA	Roger Mason (32)	19,043	24–27
52	February 13, 2008	Wizards	91–89	Clippers	NA	Antawn Jamison (29)	17,144	25–27
53	February 19, 2008	Knicks	113–100	Wizards	1	Antawn Jamison (20)	15,102	25–28
54	February 22, 2008	Wizards	89–90	Cavaliers	NA	Darius Songaila (19)	20,562	25–29
55	February 23, 2008	Bobcats	95–110	Wizards	NA	Antawn Jamison (22)	20,173	26–29
56	February 25, 2008	Wizards	95–92	Hornets	NA	DeShawn Stevenson (33)	11,289	27–29
57	February 26, 2008	Wizards	69–94	Rockets	NA	Antawn Jamison (18)	15,768	27–30
58	February 29, 2008	Wizards	97–91	Bulls	NA	Three-way tie (17)	21,884	28–30

==== March ====
Record: 10–6; home: 5–3; road: 5–3

#	Date	Visitor	Score	Home	OT	Leading scorer	Attendance	Record
59	March 2, 2008	Hornets	84–101	Wizards	NA	Antawn Jamison (28)	20,173	29–30
60	March 5, 2008	Magic	122–92	Wizards	NA	Antawn Jamison (19)	17,745	29–31
61	March 7, 2008	Wizards	110–106	Raptors	1	Antawn Jamison (25)	19,800	30–31
62	March 8, 2008	Bobcats	100–97	Wizards	NA	Antawn Jamison (30)	20,173	30–32
63	March 11, 2008	Bucks	97–105	Wizards	NA	Antawn Jamison (23)	14,755	31–32
64	March 13, 2008	Cavaliers	99–101	Wizards	NA	Caron Butler (19)	20,173	32–32
65	March 15, 2008	Clippers	109–119	Wizards	1	Antawn Jamison (36)	20,173	33–32
66	March 17, 2008	Hawks	105–96	Wizards	NA	Antawn Jamison (25)	16,227	33–33
67	March 19, 2008	Wizards	88–87	Magic	NA	Antawn Jamison (31)	16,533	34–33
68	March 21, 2008	Wizards	103–86	Heat	NA	Caron Butler (25)	19,345	35–33
69	March 23, 2008	Pistons	83–95	Wizards	NA	Antawn Jamison (24)	20,173	36–33
70	March 25, 2008	Wizards	82–102	Trail Blazers	NA	Caron Butler (19)	19,980	36–34
71	March 26, 2008	Wizards	104–99	SuperSonics	NA	Roger Mason (22)	10,497	37–34
72	March 28, 2008	Wizards	114–108	Kings	NA	Antawn Jamison (25)	14,061	38–34
73	March 30, 2008	Wizards	120–126	Lakers	1	Deshawn Stevenson (27)	18,997	38–35
74	March 31, 2008	Wizards	87–129	Jazz	NA	Antawn Jamison (22)	19,911	38–36

==== April ====
Record: 5–3; home: 4–1; road: 1–2

#	Date	Visitor	Score	Home	OT	Leading scorer	Attendance	Record
75	April 2, 2008	Bucks	109–110	Wizards	NA	Two-way tie (18)	14,355	38–37
76	April 4, 2008	Heat	109–95	Wizards	NA	Caron Butler (29)	18,875	39–37
77	April 5, 2008	Wizards	99–87	Bulls	NA	Brendan Haywood (25)	21,929	40–37
78	April 9, 2008	Celtics	109–95	Wizards	NA	Antawn Jamison (27)	20,173	41–37
79	April 11, 2008	Wizards	74–102	Pistons	NA	Antawn Jamison (15)	22,076	41–38
80	April 12, 2008	Sixers	93–109	Wizards	NA	Antawn Jamison (25)	20,173	42–38
81	April 14, 2008	Pacers	110–117	Wizards	NA	Roger Mason (31)	15,552	43–38
82	April 16, 2008	Wizards	83–103	Magic	NA	Andray Blatche (20)	16,929	43–39

- Green background indicates win
- Red background indicates loss

== Playoffs ==
2008 playoff game log
First Round: 2–4 (home: 1–2; road: 1–2)

Game	Date	Team	Score	High points	High rebounds	High assists	Location Attendance	Series
1	April 19	@ Cleveland	86–93	Arenas (24)	Jamison (19)	Stevenson (5)	Quicken Loans Arena; 20,562	0–1
2	April 21	@ Cleveland	86–116	Butler, Songaila, Stevenson (12)	Jamison (9)	Butler (5)	Quicken Loans Arena; 20,562	0–2
3	April 24	Cleveland	108–72	Stevenson (19)	Blatche, Jamison (7)	Daniels (6)	Verizon Center; 20,173	1–2
4	April 27	Cleveland	97–100	Jamison (23)	Jamison (11)	Stevenson (5)	Verizon Center; 20,173	1–3
5	April 30	@ Cleveland	88–87	Butler (32)	Jamison (11)	Butler (5)	Quicken Loans Arena; 20,562	2–3
6	May 2	Cleveland	88–105	Jamison (23)	Jamison (15)	Daniels (5)	Verizon Center; 20,173	2–4

2008 playoff schedule

== Player stats ==
Legend
GP	Games played	GS	Games started	MPG	Minutes per game
FG%	Field-goal percentage	3P%	3-point field-goal percentage	FT%	Free-throw percentage
RPG	Rebounds per game	APG	Assists per game	SPG	Steals per game
BPG	Blocks per game	PPG	Points per game

=== Regular season ===
Player	GP	GS	MPG	FG%	3P%	FT%	RPG	APG	SPG	BPG	PPG
Gilbert Arenas	13	8	32.7	.398	.282	.771	3.9	5.1	1.77	.08	19.4
Andray Blatche	82	15	20.4	.474	.231	.695	5.2	1.1	.65	1.39	7.5
Caron Butler	58	58	39.9	.466	.357	.901	6.7	4.9	2.21	.34	20.3
Antonio Daniels	71	63	30.4	.459	.230	.776	2.9	4.8	.97	.03	8.4
Brendan Haywood	80	80	27.9	.528	.000	.735	7.2	.9	.39	1.66	10.6
Antawn Jamison	79	79	38.7	.436	.339	.760	10.2	1.5	1.34	.43	21.4
Roger Mason	80	9	21.4	.443	.398	.873	1.6	1.7	.50	.23	9.1
Dominic McGuire	70	1	9.9	.379	.167	.438	2.0	.6	.29	.37	1.3
Oleksiy Pecherov	35	0	9.1	.352	.283	.645	1.9	.2	.17	.14	3.6
Darius Songaila	80	13	19.4	.458	.000	.918	3.4	1.7	.66	.20	6.2
DeShawn Stevenson	82	82	31.3	.386	.383	.797	2.9	3.1	.79	.18	11.2
Mike Wilks^{†}	4	0	11.0	.500	.500		1.5	.8	.8	.0	1.3
Nick Young	75	2	15.4	.439	.400	.815	1.5	.8	.47	.09	7.5

=== Playoffs ===
Player	GP	GS	MPG	FG%	3P%	FT%	RPG	APG	SPG	BPG	PPG
Gilbert Arenas	4	2	23.5	.389	.417	.833	1.8	2.8	.50	.00	10.8
Andray Blatche	6	0	14.8	.429	.000	.333	3.3	.2	.33	1.00	3.7
Caron Butler	6	6	41.0	.460	.238	.871	5.7	3.8	1.83	.17	18.7
Antonio Daniels	6	4	25.7	.452	.250	.882	2.3	3.0	.33	.33	7.3
Brendan Haywood	6	6	29.7	.591	.000	.800	6.7	.8	.67	1.50	12.0
Antawn Jamison	6	6	39.5	.406	.280	.571	12.0	1.0	1.33	1.33	16.8
Roger Mason	6	0	21.5	.404	.235	.750	.8	1.0	.50	.17	8.0
Dominic McGuire	3	0	5.0	.000	.000	.500	1.0	.3	.33	.33	.3
Oleksiy Pecherov	3	0	2.7	.000	.000	1.000	.3	.0	.33	.33	.7
Darius Songaila	5	0	15.4	.421	.000	.867	2.6	.8	.20	.00	5.8
DeShawn Stevenson	6	6	32.7	.367	.389	.889	2.2	3.0	1.00	.00	12.3
Nick Young	4	0	4.3	.111	.000	.750	.5	.3	.50	.00	1.3

== See also ==
- 2007–08 NBA season
