= 2007–08 New York Knicks season =

Season of National Basketball Association team the New York Knicks

- Head coach: Isiah Thomas
- General manager: Isiah Thomas
- Owners: Cablevision
- Arena: Madison Square Garden

Results
- Record: 23–59 (.280)
- Place: Division: 5th (Atlantic); Conference: 14th (Eastern)
- Playoff finish: Did not qualify
- Stats at Basketball Reference

Local media
- Television: MSG Network
- Radio: WEPN

The 2007–08 New York Knicks season was the 62nd season of NBA basketball in New York City. It began in October and ended with a loss against the Pacers in April. The Knicks missed the playoffs for the fourth straight year and equalled the most losses in a season in franchise history. As a result, Isiah Thomas was fired from GM and head coach with Donnie Walsh saying ''...we reached a point this season when our team didn't compete for a long time.''

Key dates prior to the start of the season:

- The 2007 NBA draft took place in New York City on June 28.
- The free agency period begins in July.

== Draft picks ==
New York's selection from the 2007 NBA draft in New York City.

Round	Pick	Player	Position	Nationality	School/Club team
1	23	Wilson Chandler	Forward	United States	DePaul

== Roster ==
2007–08 New York Knicks roster
Players

Pos.	No.	Player	Height	Weight	DOB	From
F	32	Renaldo Balkman	6 ft 8 in (2.03 m)	208 lb (94 kg)		South Carolina
F	21	Wilson Chandler	6 ft 8 in (2.03 m)	220 lb (100 kg)		DePaul
G	25	Mardy Collins	6 ft 6 in (1.98 m)	220 lb (100 kg)		Temple
G	11	Jamal Crawford	6 ft 5 in (1.96 m)	200 lb (91 kg)		Michigan
C	34	Eddy Curry	7 ft 0 in (2.13 m)	295 lb (134 kg)		Thornwood High School
C	13	Jerome James	7 ft 1 in (2.16 m)	285 lb (129 kg)		Florida A&M
F	20	Jared Jeffries	6 ft 11 in (2.11 m)	240 lb (109 kg)		Indiana
G	2	Fred Jones	6 ft 2 in (1.88 m)	225 lb (102 kg)		Oregon
F	42	David Lee	6 ft 9 in (2.06 m)	240 lb (109 kg)		Florida
G	3	Stephon Marbury (injured)	6 ft 2 in (1.88 m)	205 lb (93 kg)		Georgia Tech
C	5	Randolph Morris	6 ft 11 in (2.11 m)	260 lb (118 kg)		Kentucky
F	50	Zach Randolph (injured)	6 ft 9 in (2.06 m)	260 lb (118 kg)		Michigan State
G/F	23	Quentin Richardson	6 ft 6 in (1.98 m)	235 lb (107 kg)		DePaul
G	4	Nate Robinson	5 ft 9 in (1.75 m)	180 lb (82 kg)		Washington
F	31	Malik Rose	6 ft 7 in (2.01 m)	255 lb (116 kg)		Drexel

Coaches
Head coach
- Isiah Thomas (Indiana)
Assistant(s)
- Mark Aguirre (DePaul)
- George Glymph (Benedict)
- Dave Hanners (North Carolina)
- Herb Williams (Ohio State)
- Brendan Suhr (Montclair State)

Legend
- (DP) Unsigned draft pick
- (FA) Free agent
- (S) Suspended
- Injured

Roster
Updated: 2007-10-25

== Regular season ==
=== Standings ===
Atlantic Division	W	L	PCT	GB	Home	Road	Div
z-Boston Celtics	66	16	.805	–	35–6	31–10	14–2
x-Toronto Raptors	41	41	.500	25	25–16	16–25	10–6
x-Philadelphia 76ers	40	42	.488	26	22–19	18–23	7–9
New Jersey Nets	34	48	.415	32	21–20	13–28	4–12
New York Knicks	23	59	.280	43	15–26	8–33	5–11

Eastern Conference
#	Team	W	L	PCT	GB
1	z-Boston Celtics	66	16	.805	–
2	y-Detroit Pistons	59	23	.732	7
3	y-Orlando Magic	52	30	.634	14
4	x-Cleveland Cavaliers	45	37	.549	21
5	x-Washington Wizards	43	39	.524	23
6	x-Toronto Raptors	41	41	.500	25
7	x-Philadelphia 76ers	40	42	.488	26
8	x-Atlanta Hawks	37	45	.451	29
9	Indiana Pacers	36	46	.439	30
10	New Jersey Nets	34	48	.415	32
11	Chicago Bulls	33	49	.402	33
12	Charlotte Bobcats	32	50	.390	34
13	Milwaukee Bucks	26	56	.317	40
14	New York Knicks	23	59	.280	43
15	Miami Heat	15	67	.183	51

=== Game log ===
==== November ====
Record: 5–10; Home: 5–3; Road: 0–7

#	Date	Visitor	Score	Home	OT	Leading scorer	Attendance	Record
1	2 November 2007	Knicks	106–110	Cavaliers	NA	Jamal Crawford (25)	20,562	0–1
2	4 November 2007	Timberwolves	93–97	Knicks	NA	Jamal Crawford (24)	19,763	1–1
3	6 November 2007	Nuggets	112–119	Knicks	NA	Jamal Crawford (25)	19,763	2–1
4	9 November 2007	Magic	112–102	Knicks	NA	Zach Randolph (23)	19,763	2–2
5	11 November 2007	Heat	75–72	Knicks	NA	Eddy Curry (19)	19,763	2–3
6	13 November 2007	Knicks	102–113	Suns	NA	Jamal Crawford (21)	18,422	2–4
7	14 November 2007	Knicks	81–84	Clippers	NA	Two-way tie (16)	15,296	2–5
8	16 November 2007	Knicks	118–123	Kings	2	Eddy Curry (27)	12,549	2–6
9	17 November 2007	Knicks	83–115	Nuggets	NA	Zach Randolph (16)	19,679	2–7
10	20 November 2007	Warriors	108–82	Knicks	NA	Stephon Marbury (18)	19,763	2–8
11	21 November 2007	Knicks	86–98	Pistons	NA	Jon Kasday (26)	22,076	2–9
12	24 November 2007	Bulls	78–85	Knicks	NA	Eddy Curry (21)	19,763	3–9
13	26 November 2007	Jazz	109–113	Knicks	NA	Stephon Marbury (28)	18,816	4–9
14	29 November 2007	Knicks	59–104	Celtics	NA	Nate Robinson (11)	18,624	4–10
15	30 November 2007	Bucks	88–91	Knicks	NA	Two-way tie (25)	18,979	5–10

==== December ====
Record: 3–11; Home: 2–7; Road: 1–4

#	Date	Visitor	Score	Home	OT	Leading scorer	Attendance	Record
16	2 December 2007	Suns	115–104	Knicks	NA	Two-way tie (21)	18,869	5–11
17	5 December 2007	Knicks	100–93	Nets	NA	Jamal Crawford (29)	15,233	6–11
18	7 December 2007	Knicks	90–101	Sixers	NA	Jamal Crawford (28)	11,975	6–12
19	8 December 2007	Sixers	105–77	Knicks	NA	Nate Robinson (25)	18,899	6–13
20	10 December 2007	Mavericks	99–89	Knicks	NA	Zach Randolph (24)	19,763	6–14
21	12 December 2007	SuperSonics	117–110	Knicks	NA	Jamal Crawford (29)	17,637	6–15
22	14 December 2007	Knicks	96–101	Bulls	NA	Zach Randolph (27)	21,751	6–16
23	15 December 2007	Nets	86–94	Knicks	NA	Jamal Crawford (32)	18,225	7–16
24	17 December 2007	Pacers	119–92	Knicks	NA	Zach Randolph (26)	17,932	7–17
25	19 December 2007	Cavaliers	90–108	Knicks	NA	David Lee (22)	18,704	8–17
26	21 December 2007	Knicks	95–105	Bobcats	NA	Nate Robinson (20)	15,130	8–18
27	23 December 2007	Lakers	95–90	Knicks	NA	Jamal Crawford (31)	19,763	8–19
28	26 December 2007	Knicks	96–110	Magic	NA	Jamal Crawford (29)	17,519	8–20
29	30 December 2007	Bulls	100–83	Knicks	NA	Nate Robinson (19)	19,763	8–21

==== January ====
Record: 6–10; Home: 3–4; Road: 3–6

#	Date	Visitor	Score	Home	OT	Leading scorer	Attendance	Record
30	2 January 2008	Kings	107–97	Knicks	NA	Eddy Curry (24)	19,763	8–22
31	4 January 2008	Knicks	93–97	Spurs	NA	Eddy Curry (25)	18,797	8–23
32	5 January 2008	Knicks	91–103	Rockets	NA	Nate Robinson (25)	16,634	8–24
33	8 January 2008	Knicks	105–100	Bulls	NA	Eddy Curry (29)	21,838	9–24
34	9 January 2008	Rockets	101–92	Knicks	NA	Jamal Crawford (21)	19,035	9–25
35	11 January 2008	Raptors	99–90	Knicks	NA	Jamal Crawford (27)	17,456	9–26
36	13 January 2008	Pistons	65–89	Knicks	NA	Zach Randolph (25)	17,620	10–26
37	15 January 2008	Wizards	93–105	Knicks	NA	Jamal Crawford (29)	17,584	11–26
38	16 January 2008	Knicks	111–105	Nets	NA	Jamal Crawford (35)	16,128	12–26
39	18 January 2008	Knicks	98–111	Wizards	NA	Quentin Richardson (21)	20,173	12–27
40	19 January 2008	Knicks	88–84	Heat	NA	Jamal Crawford (22)	19,600	13–27
41	21 January 2008	Celtics	109–93	Knicks	NA	Zach Randolph (24)	19,763	13–28
42	25 January 2008	Sixers	81–89	Knicks	NA	Jamal Crawford (18)	19,248	14–28
43	27 January 2008	Knicks	104–106	Warriors	NA	Nate Robinson (22)	19,596	14–29
44	29 January 2008	Knicks	109–120	Lakers	NA	Two-way tie (22)	18,997	14–30
45	30 January 2008	Knicks	89–100	Jazz	NA	Jamal Crawford (26)	19,911	14–31

==== February ====
Record: 4–9; Home: 2–3; Road: 2–6

#	Date	Visitor	Score	Home	OT	Leading scorer	Attendance	Record
46	1 February 2008	Knicks	88–94	Trail Blazers	1	Zach Randolph (25)	20,422	14–32
47	2 February 2008	Knicks	85–86	SuperSonics	NA	Zach Randolph (24)	12,783	14–33
48	4 February 2008	Clippers	103–94	Knicks	NA	Eddy Curry (19)	18,050	14–34
49	6 February 2008	Pacers	103–100	Knicks	NA	Zach Randolph (26)	18,207	14–35
50	8 February 2008	Spurs	99–93	Knicks	1	Jamal Crawford (24)	19,763	14–36
51	9 February 2008	Knicks	99–98	Bucks	NA	Jamal Crawford (30)	15,874	15–36
52	13 February 2008	Knicks	103–111	Celtics	NA	Jamal Crawford (26)	18,624	15–37
53	19 February 2008	Knicks	113–100	Wizards	1	Zach Randolph (24)	15,102	16–37
54	20 February 2008	Knicks	84–124	Sixers	NA	Jamal Crawford (14)	12,881	16–38
55	22 February 2008	Raptors	99–103	Knicks	NA	Jamal Crawford (43)	19,763	17–38
56	24 February 2008	Knicks	92–115	Raptors	NA	Jamal Crawford (26)	19,800	17–39
57	27 February 2008	Bobcats	89–113	Knicks	NA	Nate Robinson (22)	18,076	18–39
58	29 February 2008	Knicks	93–99	Hawks	NA	Zach Randolph (29)	18,339	18–40

==== March ====
Record: 2–13; Home: 1–7; Road: 1–6

#	Date	Visitor	Score	Home	OT	Leading scorer	Attendance	Record
59	1 March 2008	Knicks	92–118	Magic	NA	Jamal Crawford (23)	17,519	18–41
60	3 March 2008	Hornets	100–88	Knicks	NA	Jamal Crawford (20)	18,467	18–42
61	5 March 2008	Cavaliers	119–105	Knicks	NA	Jamal Crawford (25)	18,760	18–43
62	7 March 2008	Pistons	101–97	Knicks	NA	Eddy Curry (23)	19,763	18–44
63	8 March 2008	Trail Blazers	120–114	Knicks	1	Nate Robinson (45)	19,763	18–45
64	10 March 2008	Knicks	79–108	Mavericks	NA	Zach Randolph (21)	20,203	18–46
65	12 March 2008	Knicks	91–88	Heat	NA	Jamal Crawford (23)	19,103	19–46
66	16 March 2008	Hawks	109–98	Knicks	NA	Nate Robinson (23)	19,763	19–47
67	17 March 2008	Knicks	98–110	Pacers	NA	Zach Randolph (21)	10,691	19–48
68	21 March 2008	Grizzlies	120–106	Knicks	NA	Jamal Crawford (22)	19,763	19–49
69	22 March 2008	Knicks	93–114	Timberwolves	NA	Malik Rose (20)	14,789	19–50
70	24 March 2008	Nets	106–91	Knicks	NA	Jamal Crawford (26)	19,763	19–51
71	26 March 2008	Heat	96–103	Knicks	1	Jamal Crawford (24)	19,209	20–51
72	28 March 2008	Knicks	95–103	Raptors	NA	Jamal Crawford (26)	19,800	20–52
73	30 March 2008	Knicks	109–114	Hawks	NA	Jamal Crawford (39)	16,573	20–53

==== April ====
Record: 3–6; Home: 2–2; Road: 1–4

#	Date	Visitor	Score	Home	OT	Leading scorer	Attendance	Record
74	1 April 2008	Knicks	115–119	Bucks	1	Quentin Richardson (22)	13,579	20–54
75	2 April 2008	Knicks	114–130	Grizzlies	NA	Zach Randolph (27)	10,013	20–55
76	4 April 2008	Knicks	110–118	Hornets	NA	Jamal Crawford (29)	17,779	20–56
77	6 April 2008	Magic	90–100	Knicks	NA	Wilson Chandler (23)	19,763	21–56
78	8 April 2008	Knicks	98–94	Pistons	NA	Wilson Chandler (19)	22,076	22–56
79	9 April 2008	Bobcats	107–109	Knicks	NA	Jamal Crawford (18)	18,943	23–56
80	11 April 2008	Hawks	116–104	Knicks	NA	Jamal Crawford (20)	19,763	23–57
81	14 April 2008	Celtics	99–93	Knicks	NA	Nate Robinson (26)	19,763	23–58
82	16 April 2008	Knicks	123–132	Pacers	NA	Jamal Crawford (25)	18,165	23–59

- Green background indicates win.
- Red background indicates loss.

== Player stats ==
Legend
GP	Games played	GS	Games started	MPG	Minutes per game
FG%	Field-goal percentage	3P%	3-point field-goal percentage	FT%	Free-throw percentage
RPG	Rebounds per game	APG	Assists per game	SPG	Steals per game
BPG	Blocks per game	PPG	Points per game

=== Regular season ===
Player	GP	GS	MPG	FG%	3P%	FT%	RPG	APG	SPG	BPG	PPG
Renaldo Balkman	65	0	14.6	.489	.083	.432	3.3	.6	.68	.46	3.4
Wilson Chandler	35	16	19.6	.438	.300	.630	3.6	.9	.43	.46	7.3
Mardy Collins	46	8	13.8	.326	.250	.605	1.6	1.9	.52	.17	3.2
Jamal Crawford	80	80	39.9	.410	.356	.864	2.6	5.0	1.01	.21	20.6
Eddy Curry	59	58	25.9	.546	.000	.623	4.7	.5	.24	.49	13.2
Jerome James	2	0	2.5	1.000	.000	1.000	1.5	.0	.00	.00	2.0
Jared Jeffries	73	19	18.2	.400	.160	.527	3.3	.9	.49	.32	3.7
Fred Jones	70	26	25.1	.421	.385	.746	2.4	2.4	.69	.26	7.6
David Lee	81	29	29.1	.552	.000	.819	8.9	1.2	.68	.36	10.8
Stephon Marbury	24	19	33.5	.419	.378	.716	2.5	4.7	.88	.08	13.9
Randolph Morris	18	2	10.1	.362	.000	.483	2.1	.1	.22	.11	3.1
Zach Randolph	69	68	32.5	.459	.275	.772	10.3	2.0	.86	.23	17.6
Quentin Richardson	65	65	28.3	.359	.322	.682	4.8	1.8	.68	.23	8.1
Nate Robinson	72	17	26.2	.423	.332	.786	3.1	2.9	.83	.01	12.7
Malik Rose	49	3	10.1	.367	.286	.725	2.1	.6	.33	.14	3.5

== Transactions ==
The Knicks have been involved in the following transactions during the 2007–08 season.

=== Trades ===
June 28, 2007	To New York Knicks Zach Randolph, Dan Dickau, Fred Jones, & a 2nd-round pick (Demetris Nichols)	To Portland Trail Blazers Channing Frye & Steve Francis

== See also ==
- 2007–08 NBA season
