= 2007–08 Philadelphia 76ers season =

NBA professional basketball team season

- Head coach: Maurice Cheeks
- Arena: Wachovia Center

Results
- Record: 40–42 (.488)
- Place: Division: 3rd (Atlantic); Conference: 7th (Eastern)
- Playoff finish: First Round (lost to Pistons 2–4)
- Stats at Basketball Reference

Local media
- Television: CSN Philadelphia (72 games); WPSG (5 games); CN8 (5 games)
- Radio: WIP, WPHT

The 2007–08 Philadelphia 76ers season was the 69th season of the franchise, 59th in the National Basketball Association (NBA). The Sixers finished the regular season at 40–42. In the first round of the playoffs, they lost to the Detroit Pistons in six games.

== Key dates ==
- June 28: The 2007 NBA draft took place in New York City, New York.
- July 1: The free agency period started.
- October 12: The Sixers pre-season started with a game against the Brooklyn Nets.
- November 2: The Sixers season started with a game against the Chicago Bulls.
- December 4: General Manager Billy King was fired and replaced by former Brooklyn Nets GM Ed Stefanski.
- April 4: The Sixers clinched a playoff berth to the 2008 NBA Playoffs.
- May 1: The Sixers were eliminated from the 2008 NBA Playoffs with their game 6 loss to Detroit finishing the series 4–2.

== Summary ==
=== NBA Draft 2007 ===
On May 22, the Sixers were assigned the 12th overall selection in the NBA draft lottery. On June 28, The Sixers then used that pick to select forward Thaddeus Young from Georgia Tech. The Sixers also held picks 21 and 30 of the first round that they received last season in a trade with the Denver Nuggets for Allen Iverson. They used these picks to select guard Daequan Cook from Ohio State and Petteri Koponen from Finland. In the second round the Sixers selected center Kyrylo Fesenko with the 30th overall pick. During the draft, Daequan Cook was traded to the Miami Heat for also recently drafted forward Jason Smith. Petteri Koponen was traded to the Portland Trail Blazers for swingman Derrick Byars. Finally, Kyrylo Fesenko was traded to the Utah Jazz for forward/center Herbert Hill.

== Draft picks ==
Philadelphia's selections from the 2007 NBA draft in New York, New York.

Round	Pick	Player	Position	Nationality	School/Club team
1	12	Thaddeus Young	Small forward	United States	Georgia Tech
1	21	Daequan Cook (traded to Los Angeles)	Shooting guard	United States	Ohio State
1	30	Petteri Koponen (traded to Portland)	Point guard	Finland	Tapiolan Honka (Finland)
2	38	Kyrylo Fesenko (traded to Utah)	Center	Ukraine	SK Cherkassy (Ukraine)

== Roster ==
2007–08 Philadelphia 76ers roster
Players

Pos.	No.	Player	Height	Weight	DOB	From
F/C	20	Lou Amundson	6 ft 9 in (2.06 m)	220 lb (100 kg)		UNLV
C	52	Calvin Booth	6 ft 11 in (2.11 m)	230 lb (104 kg)		Penn State
G/F	25	Rodney Carney	6 ft 7 in (2.01 m)	205 lb (93 kg)		Memphis
C	1	Samuel Dalembert	6 ft 12 in (2.13 m)	250 lb (113 kg)		Seton Hall
F	30	Reggie Evans	6 ft 8 in (2.03 m)	245 lb (111 kg)		Iowa
G	33	Willie Green	6 ft 4 in (1.93 m)	200 lb (91 kg)		Detroit Mercy
F/C	35	Herbert Hill (IN)	6 ft 10 in (2.08 m)	240 lb (109 kg)		Providence
G/F	9	Andre Iguodala	6 ft 6 in (1.98 m)	207 lb (94 kg)		Arizona
G	7	Andre Miller	6 ft 3 in (1.91 m)	200 lb (91 kg)		Utah
G	12	Kevin Ollie	6 ft 4 in (1.93 m)	195 lb (88 kg)		Connecticut
F/C	42	Shavlik Randolph	6 ft 10 in (2.08 m)	240 lb (109 kg)		Duke
F/C	14	Jason Smith	7 ft 0 in (2.13 m)	245 lb (111 kg)		Colorado State
G	23	Lou Williams	6 ft 1 in (1.85 m)	175 lb (79 kg)		South Gwinnett HS
F	21	Thaddeus Young	6 ft 8 in (2.03 m)	221 lb (100 kg)		Georgia Tech

Coaches
Head coach
- Maurice Cheeks (West Texas A&M)
Assistant(s)
- Henry Bibby (UCLA)
- John Loyer (Akron)
- Jim Lynam (Saint Joseph's)
- Moses Malone (Petersburg HS (VA))
- Bernard Smith (East Stroudsburg)
- Frank Zanin (West Chester)

Legend
- (DP) Unsigned draft pick
- (FA) Free agent
- (S) Suspended
- Injured

Roster

== Regular season ==
=== Standings ===
Atlantic Division	W	L	PCT	GB	Home	Road	Div
z-Boston Celtics	66	16	.805	–	35–6	31–10	14–2
x-Toronto Raptors	41	41	.500	25	25–16	16–25	10–6
x-Philadelphia 76ers	40	42	.488	26	22–19	18–23	7–9
New Jersey Nets	34	48	.415	32	21–20	13–28	4–12
New York Knicks	23	59	.280	43	15–26	8–33	5–11

Eastern Conference
#	Team	W	L	PCT	GB
1	z-Boston Celtics	66	16	.805	–
2	y-Detroit Pistons	59	23	.732	7
3	y-Orlando Magic	52	30	.634	14
4	x-Cleveland Cavaliers	45	37	.549	21
5	x-Washington Wizards	43	39	.524	23
6	x-Toronto Raptors	41	41	.500	25
7	x-Philadelphia 76ers	40	42	.488	26
8	x-Atlanta Hawks	37	45	.451	29
9	Indiana Pacers	36	46	.439	30
10	New Jersey Nets	34	48	.415	32
11	Chicago Bulls	33	49	.402	33
12	Charlotte Bobcats	32	50	.390	34
13	Milwaukee Bucks	26	56	.317	40
14	New York Knicks	23	59	.280	43
15	Miami Heat	15	67	.183	51

== Playoffs ==
2008 playoff game log
First Round: 2–4 (home: 1–2; road: 1–2)

Game	Date	Team	Score	High points	High rebounds	High assists	Location Attendance	Series
1	April 20	@ Detroit	90–86	Miller (20)	Evans (14)	Iguodala (8)	The Palace of Auburn Hills; 22,076	1–0
2	April 23	@ Detroit	88–105	Williams (17)	Evans (11)	Iguodala (4)	The Palace of Auburn Hills; 22,076	1–1
3	April 25	Detroit	95–75	Dalembert (23)	Dalembert (16)	Green, Iguodala (6)	Wachovia Center; 18,805	2–1
4	April 27	Detroit	84–93	Young (15)	Dalembert (12)	Iguodala (5)	Wachovia Center; 18,347	2–2
5	April 29	@ Detroit	81–98	Iguodala (21)	Evans (7)	Iguodala (6)	The Palace of Auburn Hills; 22,076	2–3
6	May 1	Detroit	77–100	Iguodala (16)	Evans (7)	Evans, Ollie (3)	Wachovia Center; 14,130	2–4

2008 playoff schedule

== Player statistics ==
Legend
GP	Games played	GS	Games started	MPG	Minutes per game
FG%	Field-goal percentage	3P%	3-point field-goal percentage	FT%	Free-throw percentage
RPG	Rebounds per game	APG	Assists per game	SPG	Steals per game
BPG	Blocks per game	PPG	Points per game

=== Regular season ===
Player	GP	GS	MPG	FG%	3P%	FT%	RPG	APG	SPG	BPG	PPG
Louis Amundson	16	0	4.0	.500	.000	.286	.8	.0	.06	.06	1.1
Calvin Booth	31	0	6.6	.333	.000	.600	1.2	.3	.19	.58	.8
Rodney Carney	70	6	14.8	.403	.317	.679	2.1	.5	.56	.33	5.8
Samuel Dalembert	82	82	33.2	.513	.000	.707	10.4	.5	.49	2.34	10.5
Reggie Evans	81	61	23.2	.439	1.000	.467	7.5	.8	1.06	.10	5.2
Willie Green	74	74	26.6	.436	.285	.757	2.5	2.0	.73	.30	12.4
Andre Iguodala	82	82	39.5	.456	.329	.721	5.4	4.8	2.09	.60	19.9
Andre Miller	82	82	36.8	.492	.088	.772	4.0	6.9	1.28	.07	17.0
Kevin Ollie	40	0	7.5	.420	.000	.800	.5	1.0	.25	.00	1.8
Shavlik Randolph	9	0	3.0	.286	.000	.000	1.2	.3	.11	.33	.9
Jason Smith	76	1	14.6	.455	.286	.659	3.0	.3	.29	.66	4.5
Louis Williams	80	0	23.3	.424	.359	.783	2.1	3.2	1.01	.16	11.5
Thaddeus Young	74	22	21.0	.539	.316	.738	4.2	.8	.99	.11	8.2

=== Playoffs ===
Player	GP	GS	MPG	FG%	3P%	FT%	RPG	APG	SPG	BPG	PPG
Louis Amundson	2	0	5.0	.500	.000	.500	3.5	.0	.00	.00	2.5
Rodney Carney	6	0	14.0	.387	.500	.500	1.2	.8	1.17	.33	5.0
Samuel Dalembert	6	6	32.2	.422	.000	.842	9.5	.5	.33	1.67	9.0
Reggie Evans	6	0	24.7	.500	.000	.625	7.8	.5	.83	.00	6.8
Willie Green	6	6	23.7	.431	.200	.643	1.3	2.0	.83	.67	9.0
Andre Iguodala	6	6	39.0	.333	.143	.721	4.8	5.0	2.17	.17	13.2
Andre Miller	6	6	38.2	.438	.000	.636	3.2	3.3	.83	.00	15.3
Kevin Ollie	3	0	6.3	.250	.000	1.000	.3	1.0	.67	.00	1.3
Shavlik Randolph	2	0	2.0	.000	.000	.750	.0	.0	.00	.00	1.5
Jason Smith	6	0	13.7	.444	.000	1.000	2.5	.5	.17	.83	3.3
Louis Williams	6	0	22.5	.400	.222	.733	2.0	2.0	1.00	.00	12.0
Thaddeus Young	6	6	26.7	.480	.200	.857	4.5	.7	1.17	.00	10.2

== Awards and records ==
=== Awards ===
- Andre Miller was named the Eastern Conference Player of the Week for games played from February 4 through February 10.
- Thaddeus Young, NBA All-Rookie Team 2nd Team

=== Records ===
- The Sixers broke the team record of fewest points allowed in a game by only giving up 63 points to the Charlotte Bobcats on November 7, 2007.
- Willie Green had a career-high 37 points against the Toronto Raptors on April 4, 2007.

== Transactions ==
The 76ers have been involved in the following transactions during the 2007–08 season.

=== Trades ===
June 28, 2007	To Los Angeles Clippers Rights to Daequan Cook (2007 21st overall draft pick), second-round draft pick (2009) and cash considerations	To New York Knicks Rights to Jason Smith (2007 20th overall draft pick)
June 28, 2007	To Dallas Mavericks Rights to Derrick Byars (2007 42nd overall draft pick) and cash considerations.	To Portland Trail Blazers Rights to Petteri Koponen (2007 30th overall draft pick)
June 28, 2007	To Utah Jazz Rights to Kyrylo Fesenko (2007 38th overall draft pick)	To Orlando Magic Rights to Herbert Hill (2007 55th overall draft pick)
September 10, 2007	To Denver Nuggets Steven Hunter and Bobby Jones	To Philadelphia 76ers Reggie Evans and draft rights to Ricky Sanchez
December 29, 2007	To Utah Jazz Gordan Giriček and future first-round pick	To Atlanta Hawks Kyle Korver

=== Free agents ===
==== Additions ====
Player	Date signed	Former team
Calvin Booth	September 10	Minnesota Timberwolves

==== Subtractions ====
Player	Date left	New team
Derrick Byars	October 22	Dallas Mavericks
Gordan Giriček	February 29	Utah Jazz

== See also ==
- 2007-08 NBA season
