= 2007–08 Indiana Pacers season =

NBA professional basketball team season

- Head coach: Jim O'Brien
- General manager: Larry Bird
- Arena: Conseco Fieldhouse

Results
- Record: 36–46 (.439)
- Place: Division: 3rd (Central); Conference: 9th (Eastern)
- Playoff finish: Did not qualify
- Stats at Basketball Reference

Local media
- Television: FSN Indiana
- Radio: WIBC/WFNI

The 2007–08 Indiana Pacers season was Indiana's 41st season as a franchise and 32nd season in the NBA. The Pacers finished the regular season with a record of 36–46 and missed the playoffs, for the second straight season.

== Draft picks ==
Indiana did not have a draft pick, but did pull off a Draft Day trade for the rights to Stanko Barać with the Miami Heat.

== Roster ==
2007–08 Indiana Pacers roster
Players

Pos.	No.	Player	Height	Weight	DOB	From
SG	6	Marquis Daniels	6 ft 6 in (1.98 m)	200 lb (91 kg)	1981–01–07	Auburn
PG	12	Travis Diener	6 ft 1 in (1.85 m)	175 lb (79 kg)	1982–03–01	Marquette
PF	1	Ike Diogu	6 ft 8 in (2.03 m)	255 lb (116 kg)	1983–09–11	Arizona State
SG	17	Mike Dunleavy Jr.	6 ft 9 in (2.06 m)	230 lb (104 kg)	1980–09–15	Duke
C	10	Jeff Foster	6 ft 11 in (2.11 m)	250 lb (113 kg)	1977–01–16	Texas State
SF	23	Stephen Graham	6 ft 6 in (1.98 m)	215 lb (98 kg)	1982–06–11	Oklahoma State
SF	33	Danny Granger	6 ft 9 in (2.06 m)	228 lb (103 kg)	1983–04–20	New Mexico
C	13	David Harrison	7 ft 0 in (2.13 m)	280 lb (127 kg)	1982–08–15	Colorado
PF	3	Troy Murphy	6 ft 11 in (2.11 m)	245 lb (111 kg)	1980–05–02	Notre Dame
PG	22	Ronald Murray	6 ft 3 in (1.91 m)	197 lb (89 kg)	1979–07–29	Shaw
C	7	Jermaine O'Neal	6 ft 11 in (2.11 m)	260 lb (118 kg)	1978–10–13	Eau Claire HS (SC)
PG	20	Andre Owens	6 ft 4 in (1.93 m)	200 lb (91 kg)	1980–10–31	Houston
SG	21	Kareem Rush	6 ft 6 in (1.98 m)	215 lb (98 kg)	1980–10–30	Missouri
PG	11	Jamaal Tinsley	6 ft 3 in (1.91 m)	185 lb (84 kg)	1978–02–28	Iowa State
SF	4	Shawne Williams	6 ft 9 in (2.06 m)	225 lb (102 kg)	1986–02–16	Memphis

Coaches
Head coach
- Jim O'Brien
Assistant(s)
- Dan Burke
- Lester Conner
- Jay DeFruscio
- Dick Harter
- Frank Vogel
- Josh Corbeil (trainer)

Legend
- (DP) Unsigned draft pick
- (FA) Free agent
- (S) Suspended
- Injured

Roster
Updated: March 1, 2008

== Regular season ==
=== Season standings ===
Central Division	W	L	PCT	GB	Home	Road	Div
y-Detroit Pistons	59	23	.732	–	34–7	25–16	11–5
x-Cleveland Cavaliers	45	37	.549	14	27–14	18–23	7–9
Indiana Pacers	36	46	.439	23	21–20	15–26	5–11
Chicago Bulls	33	49	.402	26	20–21	13–28	11–5
Milwaukee Bucks	26	56	.317	33	19–22	7–34	6–10

Eastern Conference
#	Team	W	L	PCT	GB
1	z-Boston Celtics	66	16	.805	–
2	y-Detroit Pistons	59	23	.732	7
3	y-Orlando Magic	52	30	.634	14
4	x-Cleveland Cavaliers	45	37	.549	21
5	x-Washington Wizards	43	39	.524	23
6	x-Toronto Raptors	41	41	.500	25
7	x-Philadelphia 76ers	40	42	.488	26
8	x-Atlanta Hawks	37	45	.451	29
9	Indiana Pacers	36	46	.439	30
10	New Jersey Nets	34	48	.415	32
11	Chicago Bulls	33	49	.402	33
12	Charlotte Bobcats	32	50	.390	34
13	Milwaukee Bucks	26	56	.317	40
14	New York Knicks	23	59	.280	43
15	Miami Heat	15	67	.183	51

=== Game log ===
==== October ====
Record: 1–0; Home: 1–0; Road: 0–0

#	Date	Visitor	Score	Home	OT	Leading scorer	Attendance	Record
1	31 October 2007	Wizards	110–119	Pacers	1	Mike Dunleavy Jr. (25)	16,212	1–0

==== November ====
Record: 7–9; Home: 3–5; Road: 4–4

#	Date	Visitor	Score	Home	OT	Leading scorer	Attendance	Record
2	2 November 2007	Heat	85–87	Pacers	NA	Danny Granger (25)	12,887	2–0
3	3 November 2007	Pacers	121–111	Grizzlies	NA	Mike Dunleavy Jr. (27)	14,878	3–0
4	7 November 2007	Clippers	104–89	Pacers	NA	Danny Granger (16)	10,122	3–1
5	9 November 2007	Pacers	87–96	Bobcats	NA	Jermaine O'Neal (18)	12,044	3–2
6	10 November 2007	Nuggets	113–106	Pacers	NA	Troy Murphy (18)	12,748	3–3
7	13 November 2007	Celtics	101–86	Pacers	NA	Danny Granger (24)	12,143	3–4
8	14 November 2007	Pacers	90–103	Wizards	NA	Marquis Daniels (19)	12,477	3–5
9	16 November 2007	Pacers	101–110	Raptors	NA	Two-way tie (20)	19,800	3–6
10	17 November 2007	Jazz	97–117	Pacers	NA	Mike Dunleavy Jr. (25)	12,447	4–6
11	20 November 2007	Lakers	134–114	Pacers	NA	Shawne Williams (24)	11,577	4–7
12	21 November 2007	Pacers	105–93	Hornets	NA	Troy Murphy (23)	11,609	5–7
13	23 November 2007	Mavericks	107–111	Pacers	NA	Danny Granger (25)	14,002	6–7
14	25 November 2007	Cavaliers	111–106	Pacers	NA	Marquis Daniels (25)	11,603	6–8
15	27 November 2007	Pacers	112–110	Nuggets	NA	Mike Dunleavy Jr. (30)	13,274	7–8
16	28 November 2007	Pacers	95–89	Trail Blazers	NA	Danny Granger (23)	16,168	8–8
17	30 November 2007	Pacers	93–95	SuperSonics	NA	Danny Granger (21)	14,768	8–9

==== December ====
Record: 7–8; Home: 3–3; Road: 4–5

#	Date	Visitor	Score	Home	OT	Leading scorer	Attendance	Record
18	2 December 2007	Pacers	101–95	Clippers	NA	Jamaal Tinsley (29)	13,741	9–9
19	4 December 2007	Suns	121–117	Pacers	NA	Jermaine O'Neal (30)	11,435	9–10
20	7 December 2007	Pacers	115–109	Magic	NA	Danny Granger (27)	17,519	10–10
21	11 December 2007	Pacers	105–118	Cavaliers	NA	Mike Dunleavy Jr. (23)	20,010	10–11
22	12 December 2007	Bulls	102–117	Pacers	NA	Kareem Rush (22)	10,381	11–11
23	14 December 2007	Raptors	104–93	Pacers	NA	Mike Dunleavy Jr. (23)	10,437	11–12
24	15 December 2007	Pacers	106–103	Heat	NA	Jamaal Tinsley (26)	19,600	12–12
25	17 December 2007	Pacers	119–92	Knicks	NA	Mike Dunleavy Jr. (36)	17,932	13–12
26	19 December 2007	Sixers	85–102	Pacers	NA	Marquis Daniels (26)	10,265	14–12
27	21 December 2007	Pacers	118–131	Timberwolves	NA	Mike Dunleavy Jr. (30)	15,379	14–13
28	22 December 2007	Wizards	85–93	Pacers	NA	Danny Granger (25)	11,583	15–13
29	26 December 2007	Pacers	95–107	Hawks	NA	Troy Murphy (19)	16,070	15–14
30	28 December 2007	Pacers	101–114	Pistons	NA	Jermaine O'Neal (25)	22,076	15–15
31	29 December 2007	Pistons	98–92	Pacers	NA	Jermaine O'Neal (20)	14,960	15–16
32	31 December 2007	Pacers	103–107	Bobcats	1	Jermaine O'Neal (20)	12,223	15–17

==== January ====
Record: 4–10; Home: 2–3; Road: 2–7

#	Date	Visitor	Score	Home	OT	Leading scorer	Attendance	Record
33	2 January 2008	Grizzlies	90–72	Pacers	NA	Mike Dunleavy Jr. (16)	10,186	15–18
34	4 January 2008	Hawks	91–113	Pacers	NA	Danny Granger (32)	10,797	16–18
35	6 January 2008	Pacers	96–112	Lakers	NA	Mike Dunleavy Jr. (17)	18,997	16–19
36	8 January 2008	Pacers	89–111	Jazz	NA	Danny Granger (17)	19,911	16–20
37	9 January 2008	Pacers	122–129	Suns	1	Two-way tie (22)	18,422	16–21
38	12 January 2008	Pacers	111–105	Kings	NA	Mike Dunleavy Jr. (23)	14,047	17–21
39	13 January 2008	Pacers	101–106	Warriors	NA	Jermaine O'Neal (27)	19,044	17–22
40	16 January 2008	Warriors	117–125	Pacers	NA	Danny Granger (29)	11,501	18–22
41	19 January 2008	Kings	110–104	Pacers	NA	Danny Granger (26)	14,015	18–23
42	21 January 2008	Pacers	110–103	Sixers	NA	Kareem Rush (25)	12,424	19–23
43	23 January 2008	Pacers	95–108	Bulls	NA	Danny Granger (33)	21,744	19–24
44	24 January 2008	Pacers	92–104	Bucks	NA	Mike Dunleavy Jr. (22)	14,267	19–25
45	26 January 2008	Pacers	96–98	Heat	NA	Mike Dunleavy Jr. (25)	19,600	19–26
46	29 January 2008	Pistons	110–104	Pacers	NA	Mike Dunleavy Jr. (25)	12,572	19–27

==== February ====
Record: 4–9; Home: 2–7; Road: 2–2

#	Date	Visitor	Score	Home	OT	Leading scorer	Attendance	Record
47	1 February 2008	Rockets	106–103	Pacers	NA	Danny Granger (22)	13,784	19–28
48	2 February 2008	Magic	121–115	Pacers	NA	Danny Granger (29)	13,172	19–29
49	5 February 2008	Spurs	116–89	Pacers	NA	Danny Granger (16)	11,288	19–30
50	6 February 2008	Pacers	103–100	Knicks	NA	Kareem Rush (24)	18,207	20–30
51	9 February 2008	Trail Blazers	93–101	Pacers	NA	Danny Granger (29)	14,130	21–30
52	12 February 2008	Celtics	104–97	Pacers	NA	Danny Granger (18)	13,603	21–31
53	13 February 2008	Pacers	80–96	Pistons	NA	Ike Diogu (14)	22,076	21–32
54	20 February 2008	Cavaliers	106–97	Pacers	NA	Danny Granger (30)	13,096	21–33
55	22 February 2008	Nets	103–113	Pacers	NA	Mike Dunleavy Jr. (34)	11,930	22–33
56	23 February 2008	Pacers	91–102	Nets	NA	Danny Granger (29)	17,252	22–34
57	25 February 2008	Raptors	102–98	Pacers	NA	Two-way tie (20)	10,468	22–35
58	27 February 2008	Bulls	113–107	Pacers	NA	Mike Dunleavy Jr. (25)	10,556	22–36
59	29 February 2008	Pacers	122–111	Raptors	NA	Mike Dunleavy Jr. (36)	19,800	23–36

==== March ====
Record: 8–7; Home: 7–1; Road: 1–6

#	Date	Visitor	Score	Home	OT	Leading scorer	Attendance	Record
60	2 March 2008	Bucks	106–128	Pacers	NA	Mike Dunleavy Jr. (36)	11,614	24–36
61	5 March 2008	Pacers	99–117	Rockets	NA	Two-way tie (17)	18,160	24–37
62	6 March 2008	Pacers	97–108	Spurs	NA	Danny Granger (22)	17,738	24–38
63	8 March 2008	Pacers	95–103	Cavaliers	NA	Danny Granger (19)	20,562	24–39
64	11 March 2008	SuperSonics	107–114	Pacers	NA	Mike Dunleavy Jr. (32)	11,216	25–39
65	14 March 2008	Pacers	97–116	Mavericks	NA	Ronald Murray (22)	20,354	25–40
66	15 March 2008	Pacers	111–122	Magic	NA	Danny Granger (24)	17,519	25–41
67	17 March 2008	Knicks	98–110	Pacers	NA	Mike Dunleavy Jr. (36)	10,691	26–41
68	19 March 2008	Bobcats	95–102	Pacers	NA	Ronald Murray (22)	10,813	27–41
69	21 March 2008	Timberwolves	113–124	Pacers	NA	Danny Granger (32)	11,805	28–41
70	22 March 2008	Pacers	108–101	Bulls	NA	Mike Dunleavy Jr. (25)	21,752	29–41
71	25 March 2008	Hornets	114–106	Pacers	NA	Danny Granger (26)	10,829	29–42
72	26 March 2008	Pacers	117–124	Nets	NA	Mike Dunleavy Jr. (33)	15,134	29–43
73	28 March 2008	Nets	115–123	Pacers	NA	Danny Granger (26)	13,282	30–43
74	31 March 2008	Heat	85–105	Pacers	NA	Danny Granger (23)	11,529	31–43

==== April ====
Record: 5–3; Home: 3–1; Road: 2–2

#	Date	Visitor	Score	Home	OT	Leading scorer	Attendance	Record
75	2 April 2008	Pacers	77–92	Celtics	NA	Danny Granger (14)	18,624	31–44
76	4 April 2008	Pacers	105–101	Bucks	NA	Mike Dunleavy Jr. (27)	15,639	32–44
77	6 April 2008	Bucks	97–105	Pacers	NA	Danny Granger (27)	12,107	33–44
78	8 April 2008	Hawks	98–112	Pacers	NA	Mike Dunleavy Jr. (28)	10,876	34–44
79	11 April 2008	Pacers	85–76	Sixers	NA	Danny Granger (30)	19,481	35–44
80	12 April 2008	Bobcats	107–103	Pacers	NA	Danny Granger (37)	14,265	35–45
81	14 April 2008	Pacers	110–117	Wizards	NA	Danny Granger (35)	15,552	35–46
82	16 April 2008	Knicks	123–132	Pacers	NA	Mike Dunleavy Jr. (36)	18,165	36–46

- Green background indicates win.
- Red background indicates loss.

== Player statistics ==
=== Regular season ===
Player	POS	GP	GS	MP	REB	AST	STL	BLK	PTS	MPG	RPG	APG	SPG	BPG	PPG
Mike Dunleavy Jr.	SG	82	82	2,953	424	288	86	31	1,565	36.0	5.2	3.5	1.0	.4	19.1
Danny Granger	SF	80	80	2,876	486	166	95	84	1,567	36.0	6.1	2.1	1.2	1.1	19.6
Jeff Foster	C	77	52	1,884	668	129	56	32	496	24.5	8.7	1.7	.7	.4	6.4
Troy Murphy	PF	75	61	2,106	543	165	49	32	916	28.1	7.2	2.2	.7	.4	12.2
Marquis Daniels	SG	74	1	1,546	212	137	79	18	606	20.9	2.9	1.9	1.1	.2	8.2
Kareem Rush	SG	71	15	1,504	168	89	42	19	588	21.2	2.4	1.3	.6	.3	8.3
Travis Diener	PG	66	21	1,356	115	251	35	4	456	20.5	1.7	3.8	.5	.1	6.9
Shawne Williams	SF	65	3	967	176	59	26	26	437	14.9	2.7	.9	.4	.4	6.7
David Harrison	C	55	0	702	118	14	20	59	229	12.8	2.1	.3	.4	1.1	4.2
Jermaine O'Neal	C	42	34	1,206	283	93	20	87	571	28.7	6.7	2.2	.5	2.1	13.6
Jamaal Tinsley	PG	39	36	1,293	141	326	66	10	464	33.2	3.6	8.4	1.7	.3	11.9
Andre Owens	PG	31	7	392	47	47	13	3	123	12.6	1.5	1.5	.4	.1	4.0
Ike Diogu	PF	30	1	305	85	10	7	3	168	10.2	2.8	.3	.2	.1	5.6
Ronald Murray^{†}	PG	23	17	527	47	80	25	3	254	22.9	2.0	3.5	1.1	.1	11.0
Stephen Graham	SF	22	0	128	22	9	4	1	87	5.8	1.0	.4	.2	.0	4.0
Courtney Sims	C	3	0	11	2	1	0	0	0	3.7	.7	.3	.0	.0	.0

- ^{†} Denotes player spent time with another team in the season. Stats reflect time with the Pacers only.

== See also ==
- 2007–08 NBA season
