= Oleksiy Pecherov =

Ukrainian basketball player (born 1985)

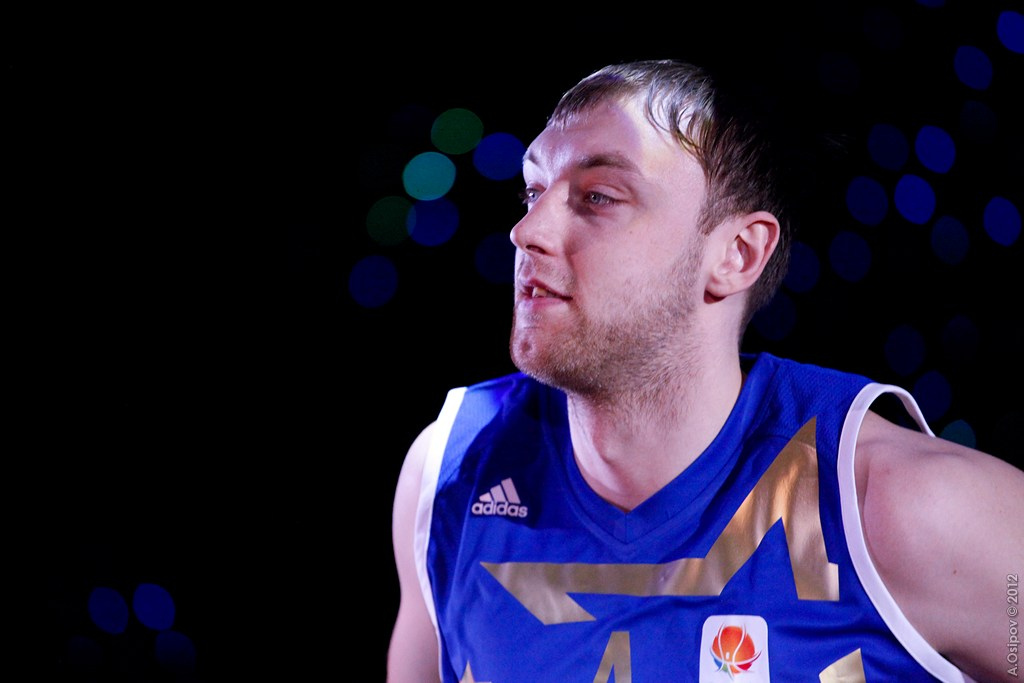

Personal information
- Born: 8 December 1985 (age 40) Donetsk, Ukrainian SSR, Soviet Union
- Listed height: 7 ft 0 in (2.13 m)
- Listed weight: 232 lb (105 kg)

Career information
- NBA draft: 2006: 1st round, 18th overall pick
- Drafted by: Washington Wizards
- Playing career: 2002–2016
- Position: Power forward / center
- Number: 14, 4

Career history
- 2002–2004: Polytekhnik Kharkiv
- 2004–2005: Kyiv
- 2005–2006: Paris Basket Racing
- 2006–2007: Kyiv
- 2007–2009: Washington Wizards
- 2009–2010: Minnesota Timberwolves
- 2010–2011: Olimpia Milano
- 2011–2013: Azovmash Mariupol
- 2013: Valencia
- 2014: Krasnye Krylia
- 2015: Kalev/Cramo
- 2016: Hekmeh

Career highlights
- Ukrainian League champion (2005)
- Stats at NBA.com
- Stats at Basketball Reference

Oleksiy Ivanovych Pecherov (Ukrainian: Олексій Іванович Печеров; born 8 December 1985) is a Ukrainian former professional basketball player. He was also a member of the Ukraine national basketball team.

== Professional career ==
The Washington Wizards selected him with the 18th pick in the 2006 NBA draft; Pecherov signed a contract with the Wizards on 5 July 2007. Pecherov had previously played with Paris Basket Racing internationally.

On 23 June 2009 he was traded along with Etan Thomas, Darius Songaila, and a first-round pick to the Minnesota Timberwolves for Randy Foye and Mike Miller.

On 16 August 2010 he signed with Olimpia Milano of the Italian league and the Euroleague for the 2010–11 season. On 23 August 2011 he signed a two-year deal with BC Azovmash of Ukraine.

On 9 November 2013 he signed a one-month deal with Valencia BC of the Spanish ACB League.

On 22 January 2014 he signed with Krasnye Krylia of Russia for the rest of the 2013–14 season. He left them on 6 May 2014.

On 4 February 2015 he signed with Kalev/Cramo of the Korvpalli Meistriliiga.

On 28 September 2015 Pecherov signed with the Denver Nuggets. However, he was later waived by the Nuggets on October 24 after appearing in one preseason game.

On 3 February 2016 he signed with Hekmeh of the Lebanese Basketball League.

== NBA career statistics ==
Legend
GP	Games played	GS	Games started	MPG	Minutes per game
FG%	Field goal percentage	3P%	3-point field goal percentage	FT%	Free throw percentage
RPG	Rebounds per game	APG	Assists per game	SPG	Steals per game
BPG	Blocks per game	PPG	Points per game	**Bold**	Career high

=== Regular season ===
Year	Team	GP	GS	MPG	FG%	3P%	FT%	RPG	APG	SPG	BPG	PPG
2007–08	Washington	35	0	9.1	.352	.283	.645	1.9	.2	**.2**	.1	3.6
2008–09	Washington	32	0	8.7	.386	**.326**	.828	2.4	.1	**.2**	.1	3.6
2009–10	Minnesota	**44**	**5**	**10.2**	**.410**	.296	**.906**	**2.8**	**.3**	**.2**	**.3**	**4.5**
Career		111	5	9.4	.386	.290	.793	2.4	.2	.2	.2	3.9

=== Playoffs ===
Year	Team	GP	GS	MPG	FG%	3P%	FT%	RPG	APG	SPG	BPG	PPG
2008	Washington	3	0	2.7	.000	.000	1.000	.3	.0	.3	.3	.7
Career		3	0	2.7	.000	.000	1.000	.3	.0	.3	.3	.7
