= Billy Thomas (basketball) =

American basketball player (born 1975)

Personal information
- Born: December 23, 1975 (age 50) Shreveport, Louisiana, U.S.
- Listed height: 6 ft 5 in (1.96 m)
- Listed weight: 220 lb (100 kg)

Career information
- High school: Loyola College Prep (Shreveport, Louisiana)
- College: Kansas (1994–1998)
- NBA draft: 1998: undrafted
- Playing career: 1998–2010
- Position: Shooting guard
- Number: 20, 12, 22

Career history
- 1999: Kansas Cagerz
- 1999–2000: Regatas
- 2000–2001: Cincinnati Stuff
- 2001: Kansas Cagerz
- 2001–2003: Greenville Groove
- 2003: Kansas Cagerz
- 2003–2004: Coop Nordest Trieste
- 2004–2006: Dakota Wizards
- 2005: New Jersey Nets
- 2006: Sioux Falls Skyforce
- 2006: Washington Wizards
- 2006–2007: Red Star Belgrade
- 2007: Kansas Cagerz
- 2007–2009: Colorado 14ers
- 2007–2008: New Jersey Nets
- 2008: Cleveland Cavaliers
- 2008–2009: Kavala
- 2009–2010: Maine Red Claws

Career highlights
- All-NBDL First Team (2002); All-NBA D-League Third Team (2008); CBA All-Star (2005); All-CBA First Team (2005); CBA Newcomer of the Year (2005)
- Stats at NBA.com
- Stats at Basketball Reference

Billy Thomas (born December 23, 1975) is an American former professional basketball player who competed in the National Basketball Association (NBA) and several other leagues. A 6-foot-5-inch (1.96 m) tall shooting guard from Shreveport, Louisiana, he last played with the Maine Red Claws of the NBA Development League. Thomas is now the basketball head coach of Rockhurst High School.

== College career ==
In his college career, Thomas set a KU record making 269 3-point field goals (that record was later broken by Jeff Boschee). He also holds the school record for 3-point field goals made in a conference game, connecting on eight of them in a game against Texas on January 10, 1998.

== Professional career ==
Thomas went undrafted after graduating from the University of Kansas in 1998.

In 2001, Thomas averaged 27.6 points in 10 games for the Tanduay Rhum Masters under coach Derick Pumaren in the Philippine Basketball Association.

In 2002–03, Thomas won the NBDL Sportsmanship Award while playing for the Greenville Groove. He played for the Dakota Wizards of the Continental Basketball Association (CBA) and was named the CBA Newcomer of the Year and a member of the All-CBA First Team in 2005.

He began his NBA career during the 2004–2005 season by signing a 10-day contract with the New Jersey Nets on January 20, 2005. Thomas later signed a second 10-day contract and eventually was signed for the remainder of the season. He appeared in 25 games that year and averaged 3.7 points per game.

On March 3, 2006, he signed a 10-day contract with the Washington Wizards. He played in 17 games and averaged 2.2 points per game.

Thomas began the 2007–2008 season with the Colorado 14ers of the D-League. In 27 games (27 starts), prior to his second NBA call-up, Thomas averaged 15.7 points, 3.4 rebounds and 3.7 assists per game. Thomas was selected to play in the 2008 D-League All-Star Game.

On December 24, 2007, Thomas was signed to a ten-day contract with the New Jersey Nets. He played in four games with the Nets, scoring a total of two points. On February 22, 2008, Thomas was signed to a ten-day contract by the Cleveland Cavaliers so they would have enough players to face the Washington Wizards that night, due to a depleted roster because of a blockbuster trade the day prior. Thomas saw his first action as a Cavalier that very night, playing 19 minutes and scoring 9 points on three three-point shots. Thomas hoisted 11 three-point field goal attempts, his career high.

On March 3, 2008, the Cavaliers signed Thomas to a second ten-day contract. His contract expired on March 13, 2008, allowing him to become a free agent.

On March 20, 2008, Thomas returned to the Colorado 14ers.

On April 16, 2008, the Cavaliers signed Thomas for the remainder of the season and the 2008 playoffs. He played in seven regular-season games for the Cavaliers scoring 12 total points (on four three-point field goals made) grabbed two rebounds and made one steal. Thomas logged eight minutes over three playoff games. He scored three points (on a three-point field goal) and had a rebound, an assist and a steal.

Thomas played for the Cavaliers' 2008 NBA Summer League team in Las Vegas. He started both games that he played and averaged five points, two rebounds, two assists, one steal and a half a block per game.

Thomas has played in numerous other leagues during his professional basketball career: the USBL, the CBA, the IBL, the D-League, the Argentine League, the Italian League, the Serbian League, the Adriatic League, the Greek League and the ULEB Cup.

On September 2, 2009, Thomas was drafted by the Maine Red Claws in the third round of the NBA Development League Expansion Draft.

== Coaching career ==
Thomas is the owner of the "Billy Thomas Hoops Academy", located in Kansas City, Missouri. Beginning in the 2010–2011 season, Thomas was the head coach of the boy's varsity basketball team at The Barstow School in Kansas City, Missouri. In the 2015–2016 season, the Barstow boys' basketball team was ranked first in the small school category by the Kansas City Star. In 2021, he became the head coach for the Rockhurst High School basketball team.

== NBA career statistics ==
Legend
GP	Games played	GS	Games started	MPG	Minutes per game
FG%	Field goal percentage	3P%	3-point field goal percentage	FT%	Free throw percentage
RPG	Rebounds per game	APG	Assists per game	SPG	Steals per game
BPG	Blocks per game	PPG	Points per game	**Bold**	Career high

=== Regular season ===
Year	Team	GP	GS	MPG	FG%	3P%	FT%	RPG	APG	SPG	BPG	PPG
2004–05	New Jersey	**25**	0	**14.2**	**.362**	.304	.778	**1.4**	**.7**	**.6**	.0	**3.7**
2005–06	Washington	17	0	7.7	.325	**.333**	**1.000**	.8	.5	**.6**	**.1**	2.2
2007–08	New Jersey	4	0	2.0	.000	.000	**1.000**	.0	.0	.0	.0	.5
2007–08	Cleveland	7	0	4.9	.286	.308	.000	.3	.0	.1	.0	1.7
Career		53	0	10.0	.338	.304	.846	1.0	.5	.5	.0	2.7

=== Playoffs ===
Year	Team	GP	GS	MPG	FG%	3P%	FT%	RPG	APG	SPG	BPG	PPG
2005	New Jersey	2	0	1.0	.000	.000	.000	.0	.0	.0	.0	.0
2006	Washington	**3**	0	**4.7**	.000	.000	**.500**	**.3**	.0	.0	.0	.7
2008	Cleveland	**3**	0	2.7	**.500**	**.500**	.000	**.3**	**.3**	**.3**	.0	**1.0**
Career		8	0	3.0	.100	.167	.500	.3	.1	.1	.0	.6
