= 2007–08 Toronto Raptors season =

NBA professional basketball team season

- Head coach: Sam Mitchell
- General manager: Bryan Colangelo
- Owners: Maple Leaf Sports & Entertainment
- Arena: Air Canada Centre

Results
- Record: 41–41 (.500)
- Place: Division: 2nd (Atlantic); Conference: 6th (Eastern)
- Playoff finish: First Round (lost to Magic 1–4)
- Stats at Basketball Reference

Local media
- Television: Rogers Sportsnet; Raptors NBA TV; TSN; The Score
- Radio: CJCL

The 2007–08 Toronto Raptors season was the 13th National Basketball Association (NBA) season for the Toronto Raptors basketball franchise, with the 2007–08 season scheduled to begin in October 2007. The major acquisition was that of three-point specialist Jason Kapono from the Miami Heat, and much expectations also rested on the maturing of Andrea Bargnani, Toronto's number one draft pick in 2006. With an overwhelming majority of home game sellouts (32, the second highest in franchise history), the Raptors qualified for the playoffs for the second year running, but this time around as the sixth seed. The Raptors faced the third seed Orlando Magic, and were eliminated in five games. The Raptors had the tenth best team offensive rating in the NBA. They did not qualify for the playoffs again until 2014, when led by Lowry and Derozan.

== Roster ==
2007–08 Toronto Raptors roster
Players

Pos.	No.	Player	Height	Weight	DOB	From
PF	7	Andrea Bargnani	7 ft 0 in (2.13 m)	250 lb (113 kg)	1985-10-26	Italy
PF	9	Maceo Baston	6 ft 10 in (2.08 m)	230 lb (104 kg)	1975-05-29	Michigan
C	4	Chris Bosh	6 ft 11 in (2.11 m)	230 lb (104 kg)	1984-03-24	Georgia Tech
C	1	Primož Brezec	7 ft 1 in (2.16 m)	255 lb (116 kg)	1979-10-02	Slovenia
PG	8	José Calderón	6 ft 3 in (1.91 m)	210 lb (95 kg)	1981-09-28	Spain
SG	20	Carlos Delfino	6 ft 6 in (1.98 m)	230 lb (104 kg)	1982-08-29	Argentina
PG	11	T. J. Ford	6 ft 0 in (1.83 m)	165 lb (75 kg)	1983-03-24	Texas
PF	15	Jorge Garbajosa	6 ft 9 in (2.06 m)	245 lb (111 kg)	1977-12-19	Spain
SF	14	Joey Graham	6 ft 7 in (2.01 m)	225 lb (102 kg)	1982-06-11	Oklahoma State
PF	43	Kris Humphries	6 ft 9 in (2.06 m)	235 lb (107 kg)	1985-02-06	Minnesota
SF	24	Jason Kapono	6 ft 8 in (2.03 m)	215 lb (98 kg)	1981-02-04	UCLA
SF	33	Jamario Moon	6 ft 8 in (2.03 m)	205 lb (93 kg)	1980-06-13	Meridian CC
C	12	Rasho Nesterovič	7 ft 0 in (2.13 m)	255 lb (116 kg)	1976-05-30	Slovenia
SG	18	Anthony Parker	6 ft 6 in (1.98 m)	215 lb (98 kg)	1975-06-19	Bradley

Coaches
Head coach
- Sam Mitchell
Assistant(s)
- Alex English
- Mike Evans
- Jay Triano

Legend
- (DP) Unsigned draft pick
- (FA) Free agent
- (S) Suspended
- (DL) On assignment to D-League affiliate
- Injured

Roster
Updated: March 27, 2008

== Offseason ==
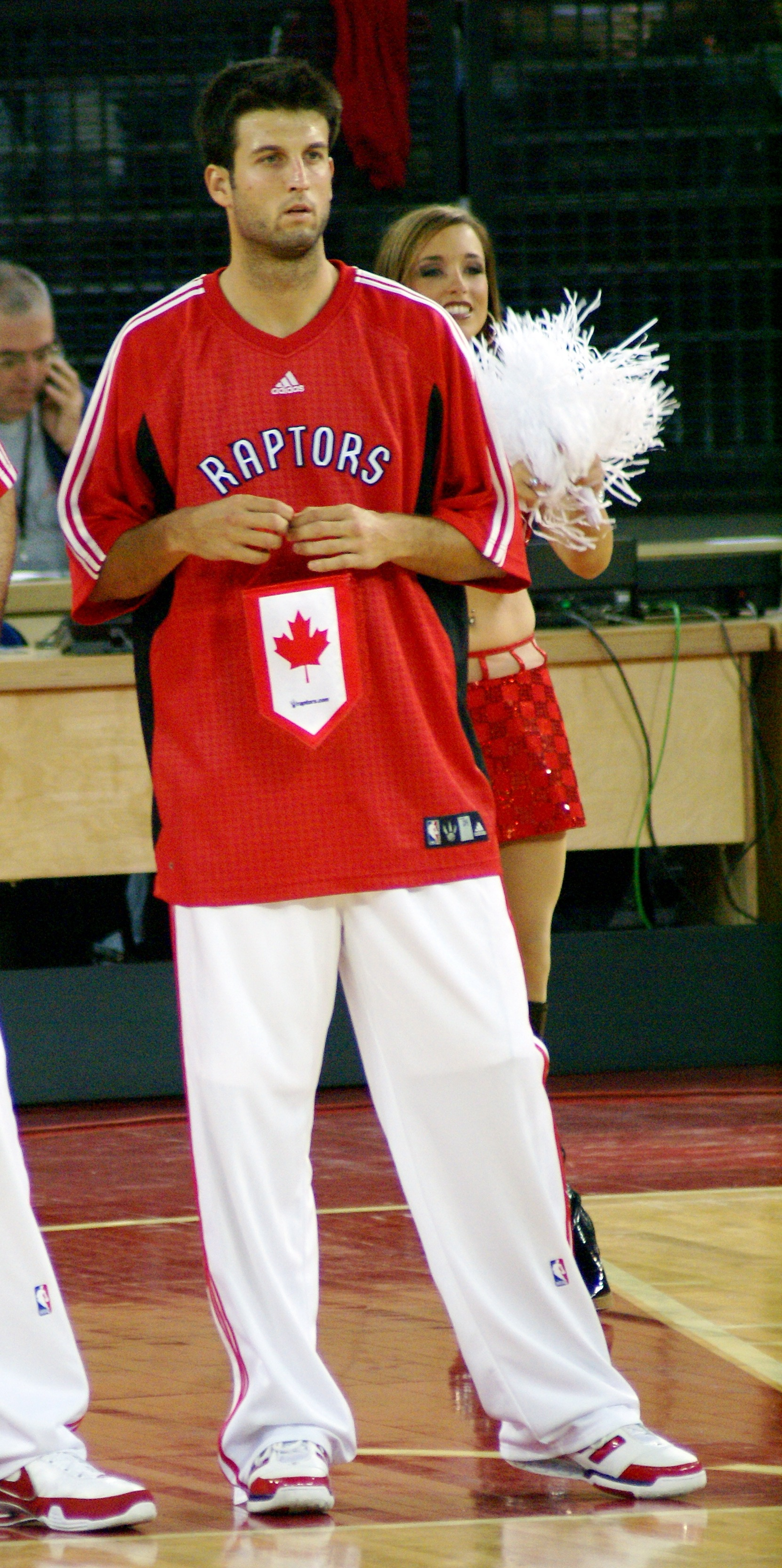
Three-point specialist Jason Kapono was Toronto's major signing before the season began; however, he was never deployed to the expected extent.

Coming off a successful 2006–07 campaign, Toronto were one of the league leaders in season ticket sales before the season began. Toronto was barred largely by salary cap from making any drastic changes to its starting lineup, but they remained active in transfer activity. The Raptors first acquired Georgios Printezis from the 2007 NBA draft, and followed up with a trade for Carlos Delfino, and the free agent signings of Jamario Moon, Maceo Baston and three-point specialist Jason Kapono. On the other hand, long-serving swingman Morris Peterson signed a four-year, $23-million US contract with the New Orleans Hornets, while Luke Jackson was waived. Toronto played seven pre-season exhibition games—including five games in a tour of Europe—and won five.

== Regular season ==
The Raptors were once again led by captain and All-Star power forward Chris Bosh, while much hope was rested on the number one pick of the 2006 NBA draft, Andrea Bargnani, who was slated to start as center. Point guards T. J. Ford and José Calderón were to be deployed in tandem, Anthony Parker filled in the shooting guard position and Kapono featured as the starting small forward (Jorge Garbajosa was ruled out for the whole season seven games into the campaign). Initially, this lineup worked well enough as Toronto won its first two games of the campaign; in its second game against the New Jersey Nets, it set franchise records for biggest margin of victory in a road game, and fewest points conceded in a road game. However, the Raptors lost the next three games: Bosh and Bargnani could not seem to play well together, and Parker went through a bad shooting streak. This prompted coach Sam Mitchell to replace Bargnani with the veteran Radoslav Nesterović as the starting centre to give the team a greater defensive presence. Toronto rebounded immediately with a road victory against the Philadelphia 76ers, and the athletic Moon was also promoted to the starting team in the next game against the Chicago Bulls, and the Raptors scored the largest win against Bulls in franchise history.

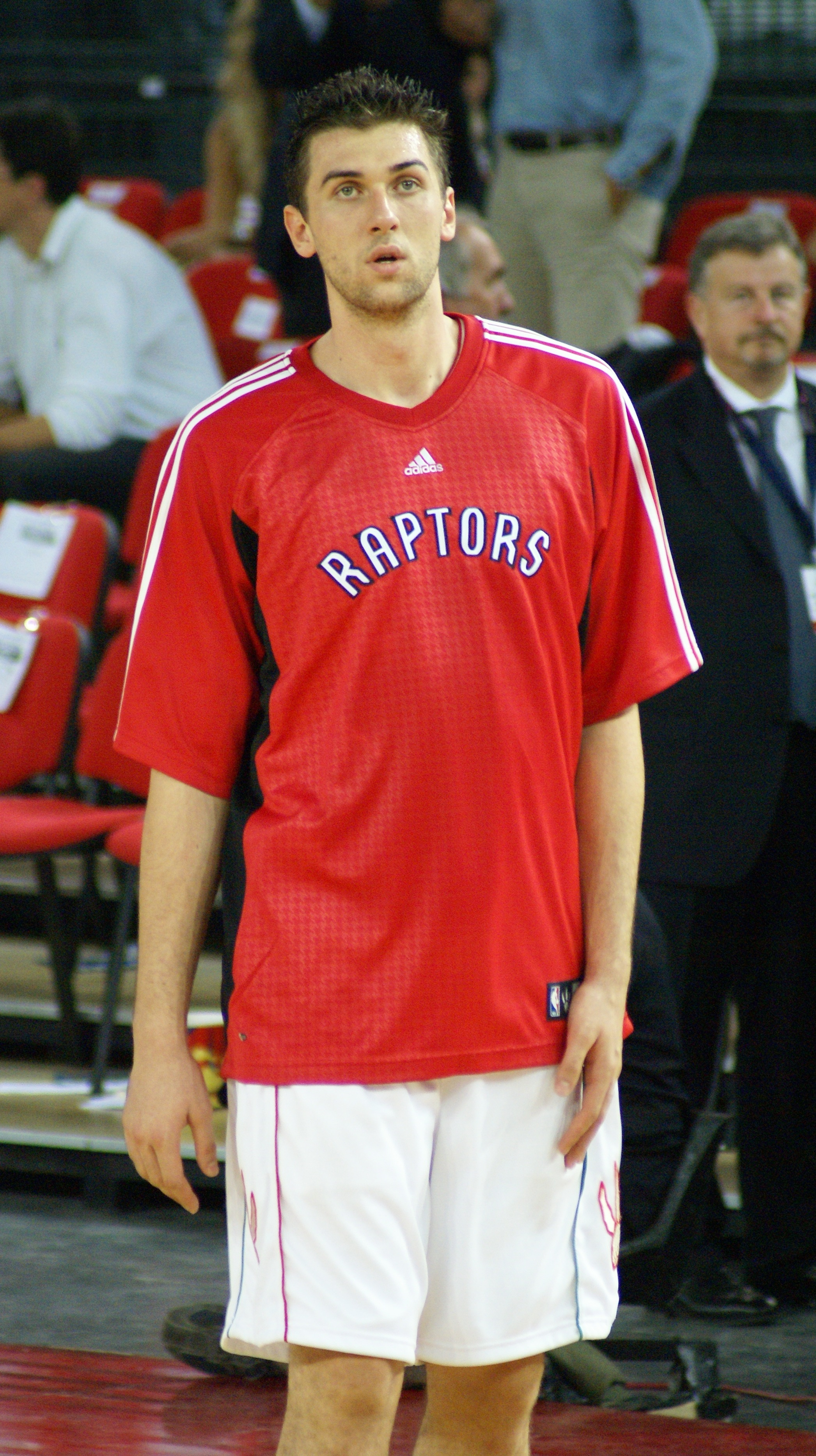
Toronto looked to their 2006 number 1 pick Andrea Bargnani to combine with Chris Bosh to form the Raptors frontcourt, but the Italian struggled for the most part of the season.

Nevertheless, the Boston Celtics, who had acquired NBA All-Stars Kevin Garnett and Ray Allen before the season began, were setting the pace in the Atlantic Division and Eastern Conference as pundits had predicted (they would go on to record a league-best 66 wins in the regular season). Meanwhile, the Raptors struggled to maintain a .500 record. Moon was kept in the starting lineup for the most part and the rookie put up several good performances, while Calderón—who would lead the league with a 5.38 to 1 assist-to-turnover ratio by the season's end—was equally outstanding stepping in for Ford who had suffered a severe injury to his back. Delfino was a revelation as well, contributing on both ends of the court when he was first brought into the fold. Bargnani on the other hand did not perform as expected and apart from Bosh, the frontcourt often saw the rotation of the Italian, Nesterovič and Kris Humphries. Kapono, in the meantime, was seldom used to his full potential, either in terms of minutes played or shots attempted.

December was a particularly challenging period, with injuries to several key players, a long road trip and games against some of the best teams in the league. Toronto reached the mid-season mark with a 22–19 record and ranked as the best three-point shooting and second best free-throw shooting team in the NBA. It marked the start of its latter half of the season with a road win against Boston, and January proved to be the best month yet as Toronto capitalised on home advantage and went 8–5.

The 2008 NBA All-Star Weekend featured four Raptors: Bosh as the starting power forward for the East in the All-Star game, Bargnani and Moon for the Rookie/Sophomore Challenge, Moon for the Slam Dunk contest, and Kapono for the Three-Point Shootout. By this period, Bargnani and Bosh were beginning to combine more effectively, while Calderón continued to put in impressive performances regularly. Juan Dixon was traded to Detroit Pistons for Slovenian centre Primož Brezec before the trading deadline.

February and early March featured mostly opponents from the lower half of the league table, but Toronto had difficulties pulling away from the .500 mark, although the home win over the Knicks on 24 February 2008—their 54th game of the campaign—was the fastest Toronto ever reached the 30-win mark in a season. Nevertheless, the loss of Bosh for several games in the final third of the campaign sent the Raptors struggle even further; in a heavy 102–137 defeat to the Denver Nuggets on 14 March 2007, the team set a franchise record for most first-half points given up. With Boston dominating the division—and subsequently winning the title easily—Toronto's problems were exacerbated by Ford's increasing frustration at playing backup to Calderón, and there were even calls for Ford to be traded at the end of the season. Nesterovič was one of the few players who played well in Bosh's absence, but was unable to halt the team's slide.

The return of Bosh in late March served as a minor reprieve, but the Raptors continued to capitulate in spectacular fashion in their remaining games, plummeting down the conference rankings with defeat after defeat, and fans were beginning to show their displeasure. In response, Bosh made a video on YouTube, urging the fans to rally behind the team as the playoffs were arriving. The Raptors went on to close out the season with a 41–41 record, qualifying for the 2008 NBA Playoffs as the sixth seed and setting up themselves with a matchup against the Orlando Magic. While ending the season as the league's best three-point shooting team (0.390) and the team with the least turnovers (13.1 per 100 possessions), the Raptors continued to be criticised for being defensively poor on the perimeter, and playing without enough aggression.

=== Season standings ===
Atlantic Division	W	L	PCT	GB	Home	Road	Div
z-Boston Celtics	66	16	.805	–	35–6	31–10	14–2
x-Toronto Raptors	41	41	.500	25	25–16	16–25	10–6
x-Philadelphia 76ers	40	42	.488	26	22–19	18–23	7–9
New Jersey Nets	34	48	.415	32	21–20	13–28	4–12
New York Knicks	23	59	.280	43	15–26	8–33	5–11

Eastern Conference
#	Team	W	L	PCT	GB
1	z-Boston Celtics	66	16	.805	–
2	y-Detroit Pistons	59	23	.732	7
3	y-Orlando Magic	52	30	.634	14
4	x-Cleveland Cavaliers	45	37	.549	21
5	x-Washington Wizards	43	39	.524	23
6	x-Toronto Raptors	41	41	.500	25
7	x-Philadelphia 76ers	40	42	.488	26
8	x-Atlanta Hawks	37	45	.451	29
9	Indiana Pacers	36	46	.439	30
10	New Jersey Nets	34	48	.415	32
11	Chicago Bulls	33	49	.402	33
12	Charlotte Bobcats	32	50	.390	34
13	Milwaukee Bucks	26	56	.317	40
14	New York Knicks	23	59	.280	43
15	Miami Heat	15	67	.183	51

=== Game log ===
2007–08 game log
October: 1–0 (home: 1–0; road: 0–0)

Game	Date	Team	Score	High points	High rebounds	High assists	Location Attendance	Record
1	October 31	Philadelphia	W 106–97	Andrea Bargnani (20)	Carlos Delfino, Anthony Parker (6)	T. J. Ford (12)	Air Canada Centre; 19,800	1–0

November : 8–7 (home: 4–4; road: 4–3)

Game	Date	Team	Score	High points	High rebounds	High assists	Location Attendance	Record
2	November 2	@ New Jersey	W 106–69	Andrea Bargnani (21)	Andrea Bargnani, Carlos Delfino (6)	José Calderón (8)	Izod Center; 14,980	2–0
3	November 4	Boston	L 95–98 (OT)	T. J. Ford (32)	Chris Bosh (10)	T. J. Ford (5)	Air Canada Centre; 19,800	2–1
4	November 6	@ Milwaukee	L 85–112	Juan Dixon (20)	Kris Humphries (9)	José Calderón (8)	Bradley Center; 13,495	2–2
5	November 7	Orlando	L 96–105	Chris Bosh (26)	Chris Bosh (10)	T. J. Ford (8)	Air Canada Centre; 17,977	2–3
6	November 9	@ Philadelphia	W 105–103	Chris Bosh (24)	Chris Bosh (10)	José Calderón (7)	Wachovia Center; 10,886	3–3
7	November 10	@ Chicago	W 101–71	Carlos Delfino (16)	Radoslav Nesterović (8)	T. J. Ford (14)	United Center; 22,467	4–3
8	November 14	Utah	L 88–92	Anthony Parker (19)	Kris Humphries (14)	T. J. Ford (8)	Air Canada Centre; 17,337	4–4
9	November 16	Indiana	W 110–101	Chris Bosh (22)	Jamario Moon (7)	José Calderón (10)	Air Canada Centre; 19,800	5–4
10	November 18	Golden State	L 100–106	T. J. Ford (29)	Chris Bosh (11)	T. J. Ford (9)	Air Canada Centre; 19,800	5–5
11	November 20	@ Dallas	L 99–105	Chris Bosh (31)	Chris Bosh, Jamario Moon (12)	José Calderón (6)	American Airlines Center; 20,272	5–6
12	November 21	@ Memphis	W 95–89	Chris Bosh (22)	Chris Bosh (19)	José Calderón (8)	FedExForum; 12,217	6–6
13	November 24	@ Cleveland	L 108–111	Chris Bosh (41)	Anthony Parker (7)	José Calderón (13)	Quicken Loans Arena; 20,018	6–7
14	November 25	Chicago	W 93–78	José Calderón (19)	Chris Bosh (13)	José Calderón (14)	Air Canada Centre; 19,800	7–7
15	November 28	Memphis	W 103–91	Anthony Parker (19)	Jamario Moon, Anthony Parker (8)	José Calderón (10)	Air Canada Centre; 18,906	8–7
16	November 30	Cleveland	W 91–82	Andrea Bargnani (26)	Jamario Moon, Radoslav Nesterović (9)	José Calderón (10)	Air Canada Centre; 19,800	9–7

December : 8–8 (home: 3–2; road: 5–6)

Game	Date	Team	Score	High points	High rebounds	High assists	Location Attendance	Record
17	December 1	@ Washington	L 97–101	Jason Kapono (23)	Jamario Moon (13)	José Calderón (11)	Verizon Center; 20,173	9–8
18	December 3	Charlotte	W 98–79	Carlos Delfino, Kris Humphries (17)	Jamario Moon (12)	José Calderón (9)	Air Canada Centre; 17,439	10–8
19	December 5	Phoenix	L 123–136	T. J. Ford (27)	Jamario Moon (10)	José Calderón (9)	Air Canada Centre; 19,800	10–9
20	December 7	@ Boston	L 84–112	Anthony Parker (13)	Joey Graham (6)	Carlos Delfino, Darrick Martin (4)	TD Banknorth Garden; 18,624	10–10
21	December 9	Houston	W 93–80	Chris Bosh (21)	Chris Bosh (10)	José Calderón (6)	Air Canada Centre; 19,800	11–10
22	December 11	@ Atlanta	W 100–88	T. J. Ford (26)	Chris Bosh (13)	T. J. Ford (8)	Philips Arena; 13,173	12–10
23	December 12	Dallas	W 92–76	Chris Bosh (17)	Kris Humphries (12)	José Calderón (7)	Air Canada Centre; 19,800	13–10
24	December 14	@ Indiana	W 104–93	Jason Kapono (29)	Chris Bosh (16)	José Calderón (16)	Conseco Fieldhouse; 10,437	14–10
25	December 16	Boston	L 77–90	Chris Bosh (17)	Chris Bosh (13)	Chris Bosh, José Calderón (5)	Air Canada Centre; 19,800	14–11
26	December 18	@ L.A. Clippers	W 80–77	Chris Bosh (24)	Chris Bosh (9)	José Calderón (9)	Staples Center; 14,455	15–11
27	December 19	@ Portland	L 96–101	José Calderón (19)	Chris Bosh (11)	José Calderón (9)	Rose Garden Arena; 16,066	15–12
28	December 21	@ Seattle	L 115–123	Chris Bosh (26)	Chris Bosh (13)	José Calderón (16)	KeyArena; 13,661	15–13
29	December 22	@ Phoenix	L 103–122	Chris Bosh (42)	Chris Bosh (13)	José Calderón, Juan Dixon (4)	US Airways Center; 18,422	15–14
30	December 28	@ San Antonio	W 83–73	Jason Kapono (15)	Kris Humphries (11)	José Calderón (5)	AT&T Center; 18,797	16–14
31	December 29	@ Houston	L 79–91	Chris Bosh (19)	Chris Bosh (12)	José Calderón (10)	Toyota Center; 18,103	16–15
32	December 31	@ New Orleans	W 97–92	Chris Bosh (29)	Jamario Moon (10)	José Calderón (12)	New Orleans Arena; 11,444	17–15

January : 8–5 (home: 6–2; road: 2–3)

Game	Date	Team	Score	High points	High rebounds	High assists	Location Attendance	Record
33	January 4	Detroit	L 85–101	Andrea Bargnani (25)	Chris Bosh (16)	José Calderón (9)	Air Canada Centre; 19,800	17–16
34	January 6	Cleveland	L 90–93	Chris Bosh (23)	Anthony Parker (9)	José Calderón (11)	Air Canada Centre; 19,800	17–17
35	January 9	Philadelphia	W 109–96	Anthony Parker (22)	Jamario Moon (9)	José Calderón (9)	Air Canada Centre; 18,067	18–17
36	January 11	@ New York	W 99–90	Chris Bosh (40)	Chris Bosh (11)	José Calderón (8)	Madison Square Garden; 17,456	19–17
37	January 13	Portland	W 116–109 (2OT)	Chris Bosh (38)	Chris Bosh (14)	José Calderón (10)	Air Canada Centre; 19,800	20–17
38	January 15	@ Detroit	L 89–103	Chris Bosh (16)	Chris Bosh (11)	José Calderón (5)	The Palace of Auburn Hills; 22,076	20–18
39	January 16	Sacramento	W 116–91	Chris Bosh (31)	Chris Bosh (9)	José Calderón (14)	Air Canada Centre; 17,760	21–18
40	January 18	Atlanta	W 89–78	Chris Bosh (35)	Chris Bosh (9)	José Calderón (9)	Air Canada Centre; 19,800	22–18
41	January 19	@ Philadelphia	L 95–99	Chris Bosh (25)	Chris Bosh, Jamario Moon (9)	José Calderón (11)	Wachovia Center; 13,853	22–19
42	January 23	@ Boston	W 114–112	José Calderón (24)	Andrea Bargnani, Chris Bosh (7)	José Calderón (13)	TD Banknorth Garden; 18,624	23–19
43	January 25	Milwaukee	W 106–75	Chris Bosh (32)	Andrea Bargnani, Chris Bosh (7)	José Calderón (12)	Air Canada Centre; 19,800	24–19
44	January 29	@ Washington	L 104–108 (OT)	Chris Bosh (37)	Chris Bosh (12)	José Calderón (13)	Verizon Center; 12,905	24–20
45	January 30	Washington	W 122–83	Andrea Bargnani (19)	Radoslav Nesterović (8)	José Calderón (11)	Air Canada Centre; 19,800	25–20

February : 7–5 (home: 4–4; road: 3–1)

Game	Date	Team	Score	High points	High rebounds	High assists	Location Attendance	Record
46	February 1	L.A. Lakers	L 101–121	Andrea Bargnani (28)	Chris Bosh (15)	Juan Dixon (6)	Air Canada Centre; 19,800	25–21
47	February 4	@ Miami	W 114–82	Chris Bosh (24)	Jamario Moon (9)	José Calderón (10)	American Airlines Arena; 19,600	26–21
48	February 8	L.A. Clippers	L 98–102	Chris Bosh (29)	Chris Bosh (12)	José Calderón (14)	Air Canada Centre; 19,800	26–22
49	February 10	@ Minnesota	W 105–82	Andrea Bargnani (16)	Chris Bosh, Carlos Delfino (9)	T. J. Ford (13)	Target Center; 13,785	27–22
50	February 11	San Antonio	L 88–93	José Calderón (27)	Chris Bosh, Carlos Delfino, Jamario Moon (8)	José Calderón (6)	Air Canada Centre; 19,800	27–23
51	February 13	New Jersey	W 109–91	Chris Bosh (27)	Chris Bosh, Carlos Delfino (9)	José Calderón (12)	Air Canada Centre; 19,800	28–23
52	February 20	Orlando	W 127–110	Chris Bosh (40)	Jamario Moon (12)	José Calderón (13)	Air Canada Centre; 19,800	29–23
53	February 22	@ New York	L 99–103	Chris Bosh (23)	Chris Bosh, Jamario Moon (8)	José Calderón (6)	Madison Square Garden; 19,763	29–24
54	February 24	New York	W 115–92	Andrea Bargnani (25)	Jamario Moon, Radoslav Nesterović (8)	José Calderón (7)	Air Canada Centre; 19,800	30–24
55	February 25	@ Indiana	W 102–98	Chris Bosh (24)	Anthony Parker (11)	T. J. Ford (7)	Conseco Fieldhouse; 10,468	31–24
56	February 27	Minnesota	W 107–85	Chris Bosh (28)	Chris Bosh, Jamario Moon (7)	José Calderón (7)	Air Canada Centre; 18,325	32–24
57	February 29	Indiana	L 111–122	Andrea Bargnani (27)	Andrea Bargnani (9)	José Calderón (11)	Air Canada Centre; 19,800	32–25

March : 6–11 (home: 4–3; road: 2–8)

Game	Date	Team	Score	High points	High rebounds	High assists	Location Attendance	Record
58	March 2	@ Charlotte	L 98–110	Anthony Parker (24)	Kris Humphries, Anthony Parker (6)	José Calderón (10)	Charlotte Bobcats Arena; 12,083	32–26
59	March 4	@ Orlando	L 87–102	T. J. Ford (20)	Carlos Delfino, Anthony Parker (9)	José Calderón, Carlos Delfino (3)	Amway Arena; 17,519	32–27
60	March 5	@ Miami	W 108–83	Radoslav Nesterović (16)	Radoslav Nesterović (10)	José Calderón (13)	American Airlines Arena; 19,143	33–27
61	March 7	Washington	L 106–110 (OT)	Andrea Bargnani (27)	Radoslav Nesterović (12)	José Calderón (9)	Air Canada Centre; 19,800	33–28
62	March 9	Seattle	W 114–106	Anthony Parker (23)	Andrea Bargnani (7)	Radoslav Nesterović (6)	Air Canada Centre; 19,800	34–28
63	March 11	@ L.A. Lakers	L 108–117	T. J. Ford (28)	Radoslav Nesterović (8)	Andrea Bargnani, José Calderón (6)	Staples Center; 18,997	34–29
64	March 12	@ Golden State	L 106–117	T. J. Ford (23)	Anthony Parker (9)	T. J. Ford (8)	Oracle Arena; 19,596	34–30
65	March 14	@ Denver	L 105–137	Anthony Parker (19)	Carlos Delfino, Jamario Moon (7)	José Calderón (7)	Pepsi Center; 17,952	34–31
66	March 16	@ Sacramento	L 100–106	Jason Kapono (26)	Radoslav Nesterović (8)	José Calderón (9)	ARCO Arena; 13,963	34–32
67	March 17	@ Utah	L 79–96	José Calderón (16)	Radoslav Nesterović (12)	José Calderón (7)	EnergySolutions Arena; 19,911	34–33
68	March 19	Miami	W 96–54	Andrea Bargnani, Anthony Parker (14)	Jamario Moon (14)	José Calderón (10)	Air Canada Centre; 19,800	35–33
69	March 21	@ Cleveland	L 83–90	Chris Bosh (24)	Jamario Moon (10)	T. J. Ford (5)	Quicken Loans Arena; 20,562	35–34
70	March 23	Denver	L 100–109	Chris Bosh, José Calderón (17)	Jamario Moon (15)	Chris Bosh (9)	Air Canada Centre; 19,800	35–35
71	March 26	Detroit	W 89–82	Chris Bosh (21)	Radoslav Nesterović (9)	T. J. Ford (9)	Air Canada Centre; 19,800	36–35
72	March 28	New York	W 103–95	Chris Bosh (29)	Chris Bosh, Carlos Delfino (10)	T. J. Ford (9)	Air Canada Centre; 19,800	37–35
73	March 30	New Orleans	L 111–118	Chris Bosh (21)	Chris Bosh, Kris Humphries (7)	José Calderón (11)	Air Canada Centre; 19,800	37–36
74	March 31	@ Charlotte	W 104–100	Chris Bosh (32)	Radoslav Nesterović (11)	T. J. Ford (7)	Charlotte Bobcats Arena; 12,188	38–36

April : 3–5 (home: 3–1; road: 0–4)

Game	Date	Team	Score	High points	High rebounds	High assists	Location Attendance	Record
75	April 2	@ Atlanta	L 120–127 (OT)	Chris Bosh (24)	Carlos Delfino (11)	T. J. Ford (13)	Philips Arena; 14,691	38–37
76	April 4	Charlotte	L 100–105	Chris Bosh, Radoslav Nesterović (23)	Radoslav Nesterović (10)	T. J. Ford (14)	Air Canada Centre; 19,800	38–38
77	April 5	@ New Jersey	L 90–99	Radoslav Nesterović (22)	Radoslav Nesterović (14)	Chris Bosh (6)	Izod Center; 15,927	38–39
78	April 9	Milwaukee	W 111–93	Chris Bosh (32)	Chris Bosh (11)	José Calderón (12)	Air Canada Centre; 18,569	39–39
79	April 11	New Jersey	W 113–85	Carlos Delfino (24)	Chris Bosh (9)	José Calderón (10)	Air Canada Centre; 19,800	40–39
80	April 13	@ Detroit	L 84–91	Chris Bosh (30)	Chris Bosh (10)	T. J. Ford (8)	The Palace of Auburn Hills; 22,076	40–40
81	April 14	Miami	W 91–75	Radoslav Nesterović (20)	Andrea Bargnani, Radoslav Nesterović, Anthony Parker (7)	José Calderón (11)	Air Canada Centre; 18,855	41–40
82	April 16	@ Chicago	L 97–107	T. J. Ford (18)	Kris Humphries (7)	José Calderón (8)	United Center; 21,909	41–41

2007–08 season schedule

== Playoffs ==
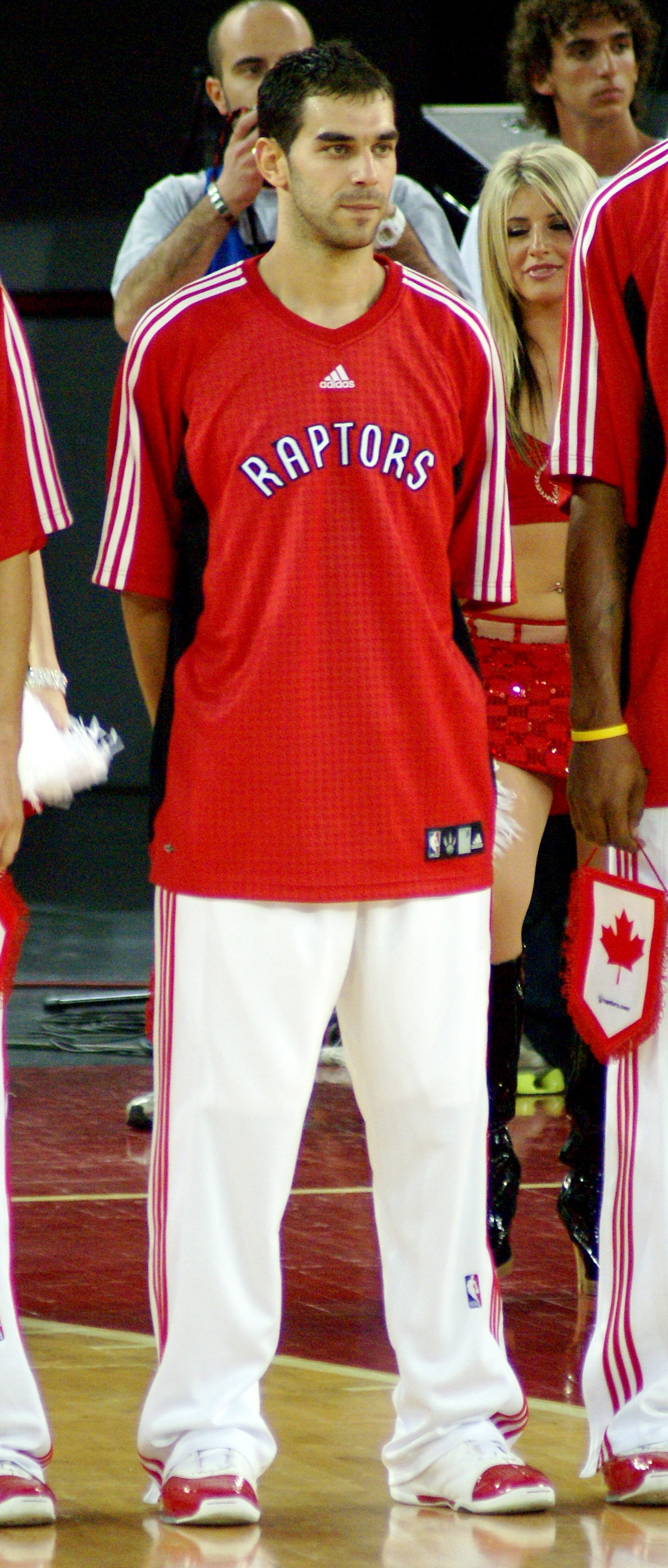
With T. J. Ford out for a large part of the season, José Calderón filled the starting point guard spot to good reviews, including leading the league in assist-to-turnover ratio.

The first-round series against the Magic was touted as the matchup between two of the league's best young big men in Dwight Howard and Bosh, but the Raptors were perceived to have an advantage in their dual-point guard play. With Orlando holding home court advantage, however, the Raptors were unable to win their first two road games. In Game 1, Bargnani was deployed as the starting small forward (with Nesterovič moved to the bench) but this did not pay dividends. Orlando took a huge lead in the first quarter with nine three-pointers converted and with Howard dominating the game, Toronto were unable to cut back on the deficit. Game 2 was the same with Orlando opening up the first quarter with a big lead and Howard dominating yet again, but solid plays from Bosh, Kapono and Calderón saw the Raptors take the lead with just a couple of minutes remaining in the game. With 9 seconds left on the clock, Bosh had a chance to score the game-winning basket but his 18-foot jumper missed the mark.

Coach Mitchell promised yet another change in the starting lineup for Game 3 at Toronto (with Moon replacing Nesterovič), and this time the Magic were unable to dominate the first quarter as before. With Ford leading Toronto in scoring and Calderón stepping up his game yet again, the Raptors preserved some hope with a 108–94 home win. Only one point separated both teams leading up to the fourth quarter in Game 4, and despite Bosh recording 39 points and 15 rebounds, deadly shooting by the Magic in the final few minutes ensured victory for the visitors. Back on the road in Game 5, Toronto were outplayed by the Magic in the second half, and were thus eliminated from the first round four games to one. GM Bryan Colangelo said at a press conference thereafter, "Whether it's protecting [Bosh] inside the paint, getting a little bit more of a presence in there, to just getting him another scorer that's going to shoulder some of that burden, it's something that's clear we have to get better", hinting that changes to the squad beckoned for the next season. Throughout the series, Orlando's point guard Jameer Nelson capitalised on being left unguarded and shot 51.9% from the three-point arc, while Howard single-handedly outrebounded the entire Toronto frontcourt with 91 rebounds.

=== Playoffs ===
2008 playoff game log
First Round: 1–4 (home: 1–1; road: 0–3)

Game	Date	Team	Score	High points	High rebounds	High assists	Location Attendance	Record
1	April 20	@ Orlando	L 100–114	Anthony Parker (24)	Radoslav Nesterović (8)	José Calderón (8)	Amway Arena; 17,519	0–1
2	April 22	@ Orlando	L 103–104	Chris Bosh (29)	Chris Bosh (10)	Chris Bosh, T. J. Ford (6)	Amway Arena; 17,519	0–2
3	April 24	Orlando	W 108–94	T. J. Ford (21)	Jamario Moon (10)	José Calderón (13)	Air Canada Centre; 20,023	1–2
4	April 26	Orlando	L 94–106	Chris Bosh (39)	Chris Bosh (15)	T. J. Ford (13)	Air Canada Centre; 20,416	1–3
5	April 28	@ Orlando	L 92–102	Chris Bosh (16)	Chris Bosh (9)	T. J. Ford (5)	Amway Arena; 17,519	1–4

2008 playoff schedule

== Player statistics ==
=== Ragular season ===
Player	POS	GP	GS	MP	REB	AST	STL	BLK	PTS	MPG	RPG	APG	SPG	BPG	PPG
Anthony Parker	SG	82	82	2,634	334	183	79	17	1,025	32.1	4.1	2.2	1.0	.2	12.5
José Calderón	PG	82	56	2,484	236	678	87	6	922	30.3	2.9	8.3	1.1	.1	11.2
Carlos Delfino	SG	82	0	1,928	359	145	69	11	738	23.5	4.4	1.8	.8	.1	9.0
Jason Kapono	SF	81	7	1,530	120	65	34	2	580	18.9	1.5	.8	.4	.0	7.2
Jamario Moon	SF	78	75	2,166	484	90	80	108	661	27.8	6.2	1.2	1.0	1.4	8.5
Andrea Bargnani	PF	78	53	1,861	288	89	23	37	792	23.9	3.7	1.1	.3	.5	10.2
Rasho Nesterović	C	71	39	1,486	342	82	20	52	552	20.9	4.8	1.2	.3	.7	7.8
Kris Humphries	PF	70	0	925	259	28	25	28	397	13.2	3.7	.4	.4	.4	5.7
Chris Bosh	C	67	67	2,425	583	171	63	67	1,496	36.2	8.7	2.6	.9	1.0	22.3
T. J. Ford	PG	51	26	1,199	100	313	54	0	617	23.5	2.0	6.1	1.1	.0	12.1
Joey Graham	SF	38	3	331	67	15	3	0	138	8.7	1.8	.4	.1	.0	3.6
Juan Dixon^{†}	PG	36	0	424	47	65	21	2	153	11.8	1.3	1.8	.6	.1	4.3
Darrick Martin	PG	17	0	141	7	21	6	0	27	8.3	.4	1.2	.4	.0	1.6
Maceo Baston	PF	15	2	103	26	3	2	4	41	6.9	1.7	.2	.1	.3	2.7
Primož Brezec^{†}	C	13	0	110	18	1	1	2	48	8.5	1.4	.1	.1	.2	3.7
Jorge Garbajosa	PF	7	0	74	15	3	3	0	22	10.6	2.1	.4	.4	.0	3.1
Linton Johnson^{†}	PF	2	0	10	1	1	0	0	6	5.0	.5	.5	.0	.0	3.0

- ^{†} Denotes player spent time with another team in the season. Stats reflect time with the Raptors only.

=== Playoffs ===
Player	POS	GP	GS	MP	REB	AST	STL	BLK	PTS	MPG	RPG	APG	SPG	BPG	PPG
Chris Bosh	C	5	5	199	45	18	8	2	120	39.8	9.0	3.6	1.6	.4	24.0
Anthony Parker	SG	5	5	196	30	10	4	2	57	39.2	6.0	2.0	.8	.4	11.4
T. J. Ford	PG	5	5	124	22	33	5	0	58	24.8	4.4	6.6	1.0	.0	11.6
Andrea Bargnani	PF	5	5	104	7	2	4	3	32	20.8	1.4	.4	.8	.6	6.4
Jamario Moon	SF	5	3	104	24	4	6	3	27	20.8	4.8	.8	1.2	.6	5.4
Rasho Nesterović	C	5	2	77	13	3	1	2	23	15.4	2.6	.6	.2	.4	4.6
Jason Kapono	SF	5	0	152	13	4	2	0	78	30.4	2.6	.8	.4	.0	15.6
Carlos Delfino	SG	5	0	121	24	11	4	0	43	24.2	4.8	2.2	.8	.0	8.6
José Calderón	PG	5	0	120	18	35	1	0	59	24.0	3.6	7.0	.2	.0	11.8
Kris Humphries	PF	3	0	2	0	0	0	0	0	.7	.0	.0	.0	.0	.0
Joey Graham	SF	2	0	2	0	0	0	0	0	1.0	.0	.0	.0	.0	.0
Maceo Baston	PF	1	0	1	0	0	1	0	0	1.0	.0	.0	1.0	.0	.0
