= 2011–12 Atlanta Hawks season =

NBA professional basketball team season

- Head coach: Larry Drew
- Owners: Atlanta Spirit LLC
- Arena: Philips Arena

Results
- Record: 40–26 (.606)
- Place: Division: 2nd (Southeast); Conference: 4th (Eastern)
- Playoff finish: First round (lost to Celtics 2–4)
- Stats at Basketball Reference

Local media
- Television: Fox Sports South; SportSouth
- Radio: 99X

The 2011–12 Atlanta Hawks season was the 63rd season of the franchise in the National Basketball Association (NBA), and the 44th in Atlanta. The Hawks finished the lockout-shortened season in 5th place in the Eastern Conference with a 40–26 record and reached the 2012 NBA Playoffs where they lost in the first round against the Boston Celtics in six games.

== Key dates ==
- June 23: The 2011 NBA draft will take place at Prudential Center in Newark, New Jersey.
- December 27: The Hawks begin the regular season with a victory against the New Jersey Nets.
- April 16: Atlanta secures a playoff spot with a 109–87 win against the Toronto Raptors.

== Draft picks ==
Round	Pick	Player	Position	Nationality	College
2	48	Keith Benson	Center	United States	Oakland

== Roster ==
2011–12 Atlanta Hawks roster
Players

Pos.	No.	Player	Height	Weight	DOB	From
C	34	Jason Collins	7 ft 0 in (2.13 m)	255 lb (116 kg)	1978-12-02	Stanford
C	25	Erick Dampier	6 ft 11 in (2.11 m)	265 lb (120 kg)	1976-07-14	Mississippi State
G	33	Willie Green	6 ft 3 in (1.91 m)	201 lb (91 kg)	1981-07-28	Detroit Mercy
G	6	Kirk Hinrich	6 ft 4 in (1.93 m)	190 lb (86 kg)	1981-01-02	Kansas
F/C	15	Al Horford	6 ft 10 in (2.08 m)	250 lb (113 kg)	1986-06-03	Florida
F	44	Ivan Johnson	6 ft 8 in (2.03 m)	230 lb (104 kg)	1984-04-10	Cal State San Bernardino
G	2	Joe Johnson	6 ft 7 in (2.01 m)	240 lb (109 kg)	1981-06-29	Arkansas
G/F	1	Tracy McGrady	6 ft 8 in (2.03 m)	225 lb (102 kg)	1979-05-24	Mt. Zion Academy (NC)
C	27	Zaza Pachulia	6 ft 11 in (2.11 m)	275 lb (125 kg)	1984-02-10	Republic of Georgia
G	7	Jannero Pargo	6 ft 1 in (1.85 m)	185 lb (84 kg)	1979-10-22	Arkansas
F	77	Vladimir Radmanović	6 ft 10 in (2.08 m)	235 lb (107 kg)	1980-11-19	Serbia
F	5	Josh Smith	6 ft 9 in (2.06 m)	225 lb (102 kg)	1985-12-05	Oak Hill Academy (VA)
G/F	42	Jerry Stackhouse	6 ft 6 in (1.98 m)	218 lb (99 kg)	1974-11-05	North Carolina
G	0	Jeff Teague	6 ft 2 in (1.88 m)	181 lb (82 kg)	1988-06-10	Wake Forest
F	24	Marvin Williams	6 ft 9 in (2.06 m)	245 lb (111 kg)	1986-06-19	North Carolina

Coaches
Head coach
- Larry Drew
Assistant(s)
- Bob Bender
- Lester Conner
- Kenny Gattison
- Tyrone Hill
- Pete Radulovic
- Wally Blase (trainer)

Legend
- (DP) Unsigned draft pick
- (FA) Free agent
- (S) Suspended
- (GL) On assignment to G League affiliate
- (TW) Two-way affiliate player
- (L) On leave from the team
- Injured

Roster
Updated: March 15, 2012

== Pre-season ==
Due to the 2011 NBA lockout negotiations, the programmed pre-season schedule, along with the first two weeks of the regular season were scrapped, and a two-game pre-season was set for each team once the lockout concluded.

2011 pre-season game log
Pre-season: 1–1 (home: 1–0; road: 0–1)

Game	Date	Team	Score	High points	High rebounds	High assists	Location Attendance	Record
1	December 19	@ Charlotte Bobcats	77–79	Josh Smith; Al Horford (11)	Josh Smith; Ivan Johnson (7)	Joe Johnson (5)	Time Warner Cable Arena	0–1
2	December 22	Charlotte Bobcats	92–75	Josh Smith (21)	Zaza Pachulia (8)	Joe Johnson (5)	Philips Arena	1–1

2011–12 season schedule

== Regular season ==
=== Standings ===
Southeast Division	W	L	PCT	GB	Home	Road	Div	GP
y-Miami Heat	46	20	.697	–	28–5	18–15	9–5	66
x-Atlanta Hawks	40	26	.606	6	23–10	17–16	11–3	66
x-Orlando Magic	37	29	.561	9	21–12	16–17	8–7	66
Washington Wizards	20	46	.303	26	11–22	9–24	7–7	66
Charlotte Bobcats	7	59	.106	39	4–29	3–30	1–14	66

Eastern Conference
#	Team	W	L	PCT	GB	GP
1	z-Chicago Bulls	50	16	.758	–	66
2	y-Miami Heat *	46	20	.697	4.0	66
3	x-Indiana Pacers *	42	24	.636	8.0	66
4	y-Boston Celtics	39	27	.591	11.0	66
5	x-Atlanta Hawks	40	26	.606	10.0	66
6	x-Orlando Magic	37	29	.561	13.0	66
7	x-New York Knicks	36	30	.545	14.0	66
8	x-Philadelphia 76ers	35	31	.530	15.0	66
9	Milwaukee Bucks	31	35	.470	19.0	66
10	Detroit Pistons	25	41	.379	25.0	66
11	Toronto Raptors	23	43	.348	27.0	66
12	New Jersey Nets	22	44	.333	28.0	66
13	Cleveland Cavaliers	21	45	.318	29.0	66
14	Washington Wizards	20	46	.303	30.0	66
15	Charlotte Bobcats	7	59	.106	43.0	66

=== Game log ===
2011–12 game log
Total: 40–26 (home: 23–10; road: 17–16)
December: 3–1 (home: 2–0; road: 1–1)

Game	Date	Team	Score	High points	High rebounds	High assists	Location Attendance	Record
1	December 27	@ New Jersey	W 106–70	Vladimir Radmanović (17)	Zaza Pachulia (11)	Vladimir Radmanović (5)	Prudential Center; 18,711	1–0
2	December 28	Washington	W 101–83	Joe Johnson (18)	Al Horford; Josh Smith (10)	Jeff Teague (5)	Philips Arena; 17,750	2–0
3	December 30	New Jersey	W 105–98	Jeff Teague (22)	Zaza Pachulia (8)	Jeff Teague (6)	Philips Arena; 16,300	3–0
4	December 31	@ Houston	L 84–95	Al Horford; Joe Johnson (15)	Josh Smith (7)	Jeff Teague (5)	Toyota Center; 14,390	3–1

January: 13–5 (home: 6–1; road: 7–4)

Game	Date	Team	Score	High points	High rebounds	High assists	Location Attendance	Record
5	January 2	@ Miami	W 100–92	Joe Johnson (21)	Al Horford (9)	Jeff Teague (5)	American Airlines Arena; 20,078	4–1
6	January 3	@ Chicago	L 74–76	Al Horford (16)	Josh Smith (14)	Joe Johnson; Jeff Teague (4)	United Center; 22,166	4–2
7	January 5	Miami	L 109–116 (3OT)	Joe Johnson (20)	Josh Smith (13)	Jeff Teague (7)	Philips Arena; 18,371	4–3
8	January 6	@ Charlotte	W 102–96 (OT)	Josh Smith (23)	Josh Smith (13)	Jeff Teague (9)	Time Warner Cable Arena; 17,827	5–3
9	January 7	Chicago	W 109–94	Josh Smith (25)	Al Horford (7)	Jeff Teague (8)	Philips Arena; 17,112	6–3
10	January 9	@ New Jersey	W 106–101	Josh Smith (26)	Al Horford (9)	Al Horford; Joe Johnson (6)	Prudential Center; 12,259	7–3
11	January 11	@ Indiana	L 84–96	Josh Smith (16)	Josh Smith; Zaza Pachulia (7)	Three players (3)	Bankers Life Fieldhouse; 10,334	7–4
12	January 12	Charlotte	W 111–81	Josh Smith (30)	Josh Smith (13)	Joe Johnson (8)	Philips Arena; 10,597	8–4
13	January 14	Minnesota	W 93–91	Joe Johnson (25)	Ivan Johnson (11)	Jeff Teague (10)	Philips Arena; 13,135	9–4
14	January 16	Toronto	W 93–84	Josh Smith (28)	Josh Smith (15)	Joe Johnson; Jeff Teague (6)	Philips Arena; 11,050	10–4
15	January 18	Portland	W 92–89	Joe Johnson (24)	Josh Smith; Zaza Pachulia (11)	Joe Johnson; Jeff Teague (5)	Philips Arena; 13,729	11–4
16	January 20	@ Philadelphia	L 76–90	Willie Green (14)	Josh Smith (6)	Jeff Teague (6)	Wells Fargo Center; 17,724	11–5
17	January 21	Cleveland	W 121–94	Joe Johnson (25)	Josh Smith (11)	Jannero Pargo (6)	Philips Arena; 15,922	12–5
18	January 23	@ Milwaukee	W 97–92	Joe Johnson (26)	Zaza Pachulia (14)	Jeff Teague; Tracy McGrady (5)	Bradley Center; 13,048	13–5
19	January 25	@ San Antonio	L 83–105	Jeff Teague (20)	Marvin Williams (9)	Joe Johnson (7)	AT&T Center; 17,888	13–6
20	January 27	@ Detroit	W 107–101 (OT)	Joe Johnson (30)	Josh Smith (11)	Kirk Hinrich (9)	The Palace of Auburn Hills; 14,010	14–6
21	January 29	@ New Orleans	W 94–72	Jeff Teague (24)	Joe Johnson (9)	Jeff Teague (4)	New Orleans Arena; 14,962	15–6
22	January 31	@ Toronto	W 100–77	Joe Johnson (30)	Josh Smith; Zaza Pachulia; Ivan Johnson (6)	Jeff Teague (5)	Air Canada Centre; 16,117	16–6

February: 4–9 (home: 2–5; road: 2–4)

Game	Date	Team	Score	High points	High rebounds	High assists	Location Attendance	Record
23	February 2	Memphis	L 77–96	Josh Smith (11)	Ivan Johnson (9)	Tracy McGrady; Jeff Teague; Jannero Pargo (4)	Philips Arena; 14,211	16–7
24	February 4	Philadelphia	L 87–98	Jeff Teague (21)	Ivan Johnson (13)	Jeff Teague (6)	Philips Arena; 18,012	16–8
25	February 6	Phoenix	L 90–99	Josh Smith (18)	Zaza Pachulia (8)	Three players (3)	Philips Arena; 11,823	16–9
26	February 8	Indiana	W 97–87	Josh Smith (28)	Josh Smith (12)	Joe Johnson (8)	Philips Arena; 16,288	17–9
27	February 10	@ Orlando	W 89–87 (OT)	Josh Smith (23)	Josh Smith (19)	Joe Johnson; Josh Smith (5)	Amway Center; 18,846	18–9
28	February 12	Miami	L 87–107	Willie Green (17)	Zaza Pachulia (16)	Josh Smith (7)	Philips Arena; 18,371	18–10
29	February 14	@ L. A. Lakers	L 78–86	Jeff Teague (18)	Zaza Pachulia (10)	Joe Johnson (5)	Staples Center; 18,997	18–11
30	February 15	@ Phoenix	W 101–99	Josh Smith (30)	Josh Smith (17)	Josh Smith (7)	US Airways Center; 15,392	19–11
31	February 18	@ Portland	L 77–97	Joe Johnson (19)	Zaza Pachulia; Josh Smith (10)	Josh Smith (9)	Rose Garden; 20,635	19–12
32	February 20	@ Chicago	L 79–90	Jannero Pargo (19)	Josh Smith (12)	Josh Smith (5)	United Center; 22,033	19–13
33	February 22	@ New York	L 82–99	Jeff Teague (18)	Ivan Johnson (8)	Willie Green (4)	Madison Square Garden; 19,763	19–14
34	February 23	Orlando	W 83–78	Josh Smith (22)	Zaza Pachulia (13)	Kirk Hinrich; Zaza Pachulia (4)	Philips Arena; 14,523	20–14
35	February 29	Golden State	L 82–85	Joe Johnson (18)	Zaza Pachulia (16)	Jeff Teague (4)	Philips Arena; 13,049	20–15

March: 11–8 (home: 7–2; road: 4–6)

Game	Date	Team	Score	High points	High rebounds	High assists	Location Attendance	Record
36	March 2	Milwaukee	W 99–94	Josh Smith (24)	Josh Smith (19)	Tracy McGrady (5)	Philips Arena; 13,311	21–15
37	March 3	Oklahoma City	W 97–90	Josh Smith (30)	Zaza Pachulia (14)	Jerry Stackhouse (5)	Philips Arena; 18,087	22–15
38	March 6	@ Indiana	W 101–96	Josh Smith (27)	Zaza Pachulia (10)	Jeff Teague (9)	Bankers Life Fieldhouse; 11,393	23–15
39	March 7	@ Miami	L 86–89	Josh Smith (23)	Zaza Pachulia (10)	Zaza Pachulia; Jannero Pargo (3)	American Airlines Arena; 20,018	23–16
40	March 9	@ Detroit	L 85–86	Josh Smith (21)	Josh Smith (7)	Joe Johnson (4)	The Palace of Auburn Hills; 15,503	23–17
41	March 11	@ Sacramento	W 106–99	Josh Smith (28)	Zaza Pachulia (13)	Jeff Teague (7)	Power Balance Pavilion; 13,976	24–17
42	March 13	@ Denver	L 117–118 (OT)	Joe Johnson (34)	Zaza Pachulia; Josh Smith (13)	Jeff Teague (8)	Pepsi Center; 15,594	24–18
43	March 14	@ L. A. Clippers	L 82–96	Joe Johnson (19)	Zaza Pachulia (10)	Joe Johnson; Jeff Teague (5)	Staples Center; 19,060	24–19
44	March 16	Washington	W 102–88	Joe Johnson (34)	Zaza Pachulia (10)	Josh Smith (8)	Philips Arena; 15,241	25–19
45	March 18	@ Cleveland	W 103–87	Joe Johnson (28)	Zaza Pachulia (12)	Josh Smith (9)	Quicken Loans Arena; 15,645	26–19
46	March 19	Boston	L 76–79	Joe Johnson (25)	Zaza Pachulia (13)	Josh Smith (8)	Philips Arena; 16,412	26–20
47	March 21	Cleveland	W 103–102 (OT)	Josh Smith (32)	Josh Smith (17)	Jeff Teague (7)	Philips Arena; 12,331	27–20
48	March 23	New Jersey	W 93–84	Josh Smith (30)	Josh Smith (12)	Jeff Teague (6)	Philips Arena; 14,129	28–20
49	March 24	@ Washington	W 95–92	Josh Smith (20)	Josh Smith (9)	Jeff Teague (9)	Verizon Center; 18,588	29–20
50	March 25	Utah	W 139–133 (4OT)	Joe Johnson (37)	Zaza Pachulia (20)	Jeff Teague (9)	Philips Arena; 13,544	30–20
51	March 27	@ Milwaukee	L 101–108	Josh Smith (30)	Josh Smith (18)	Joe Johnson (8)	Bradley Center; 12,223	30–21
52	March 28	Chicago	L 77–98	Josh Smith (19)	Zaza Pachulia (10)	Jeff Teague (8)	Philips Arena; 16,290	30–22
53	March 30	New York	W 100–90	Joe Johnson (28)	Zaza Pachulia (12)	Jeff Teague (7)	Philips Arena; 18,389	31–22
54	March 31	@ Philadelphia	L 90–95	Josh Smith (34)	Josh Smith (9)	Kirk Hinrich (6)	Wells Fargo Center; 19,714	31–23

April: 9–3 (home: 6–2; road: 3–1)

Game	Date	Team	Score	High points	High rebounds	High assists	Location Attendance	Record
55	April 4	Charlotte	W 120–93	Josh Smith (24)	Zaza Pachulia (11)	Jannero Pargo; Jeff Teague (6)	Philips Arena; 13,046	32–23
56	April 6	Detroit	W 101–96	Jeff Teague (24)	Josh Smith (12)	Jeff Teague (11)	Philips Arena; 15,143	33–23
57	April 7	@ Charlotte	W 116–96	Joe Johnson (18)	Zaza Pachulia (16)	Jannero Pargo (9)	Time Warner Cable Arena; 14,715	34–23
58	April 11	@ Boston	L 86–88 (OT)	Jeff Teague (21)	Josh Smith (11)	Jeff Teague (6)	TD Garden; 18,624	34–24
59	April 13	@ Orlando	W 109–81	Jannero Pargo (17)	Josh Smith (8)	Josh Smith (4)	Amway Center; 18,846	35–24
60	April 15	Toronto	L 86–102	Josh Smith (26)	Josh Smith (8)	Joe Johnson (5)	Philips Arena; 13,845	35–25
61	April 16	@ Toronto	W 109–87	Ivan Johnson (21)	Josh Smith (9)	Jeff Teague (10)	Air Canada Centre; 15,992	36–25
62	April 18	Detroit	W 116–84	Tracy McGrady (17)	Ivan Johnson (10)	Jannero Pargo (8)	Philips Arena; 14,392	37–25
63	April 20	Boston	W 97–92	Joe Johnson (30)	Josh Smith (12)	Joe Johnson (6)	Philips Arena; 16,214	38–25
64	April 22	New York	L 112–113	Marvin Williams (29)	Marvin Williams (11)	Jeff Teague (6)	Philips Arena; 18,158	38–26
65	April 24	L. A. Clippers	W 109–102	Joe Johnson (28)	Josh Smith (10)	Josh Smith (5)	Philips Arena; 18,223	39–26
66	April 26	Dallas	W 106–89	Josh Smith (23)	Josh Smith (9)	Josh Smith (7)	Philips Arena; 14,595	40–26

2011–12 season schedule

== Playoffs ==
2012 playoff game log
First round: 2–4 (home: 2–1; road: 0–3)

Game	Date	Team	Score	High points	High rebounds	High assists	Location Attendance	Series
1	April 29	Boston	W 83–74	Josh Smith (22)	Josh Smith (18)	Joe Johnson (5)	Philips Arena; 19,292	1–0
2	May 1	Boston	L 80–87	Joe Johnson (22)	Josh Smith (12)	Joe Johnson, Josh Smith (5)	Philips Arena; 19,308	1–1
3	May 4	@ Boston	L 84–90 (OT)	Joe Johnson (29)	Marvin Williams (11)	Jeff Teague (6)	TD Garden; 18,624	1–2
4	May 5	@ Boston	L 79–101	Josh Smith (15)	Josh Smith (13)	Josh Smith (5)	TD Garden; 18,624	1–3
5	May 8	Boston	W 87–86	Al Horford (19)	Josh Smith (16)	Josh Smith (6)	Philips Arena; 19,319	2–3
6	May 10	@ Boston	L 80–83	Josh Smith (18)	Al Horford, Josh Smith (9)	Jeff Teague (6)	TD Garden; 18,624	2–4

2012 playoff schedule

== Player statistics ==
Legend
GP	Games played	GS	Games started	MPG	Minutes per game
FG%	Field-goal percentage	3P%	3-point field-goal percentage	FT%	Free-throw percentage
RPG	Rebounds per game	APG	Assists per game	SPG	Steals per game
BPG	Blocks per game	PPG	Points per game

=== Regular season ===
Player	GP	GS	MPG	FG%	3P%	FT%	RPG	APG	SPG	BPG	PPG
Jason Collins	30	10	10.3	.400		.467	1.6	.3	.1	.1	1.3
Erick Dampier^{[a]}	15	0	5.5	.125			1.7	.3	.1	.3	.1
Willie Green	53	2	17.4	.471	.442	.857	1.5	.8	.4	.1	7.6
Kirk Hinrich	48	31	25.8	.414	.346	.781	2.1	2.8	.8	.2	6.6
Al Horford	11	11	31.6	.553	.000	.733	7.0	2.2	.9	1.3	12.4
Ivan Johnson	56	0	16.7	.513	.333	.720	4.0	.6	.8	.3	6.4
Joe Johnson	60	60	35.5	.454	.388	.849	3.7	3.9	.8	.2	18.8
Tracy McGrady	52	0	16.1	.437	.455	.675	3.0	2.1	.3	.3	5.3
Zaza Pachulia	58	44	28.3	.499		.741	7.9	1.4	.9	.5	7.8
Jannero Pargo	50	0	13.4	.415	.384	.950	1.5	1.9	.4	.0	5.6
Vladimir Radmanović	49	3	15.4	.376	.370	.759	2.9	1.1	.4	.3	4.5
Donald Sloan^{[a]}	5	0	4.0	.375	.000		1.0	1.0	.2	.0	1.2
Josh Smith	66	66	35.3	.458	.257	.630	9.6	3.9	1.4	1.7	18.8
Jerry Stackhouse	30	0	9.1	.370	.342	.913	.8	.5	.3	.1	3.6
Jeff Teague	66	66	33.1	.476	.342	.757	2.4	4.9	1.6	.6	12.6
Marvin Williams	57	37	26.3	.432	.389	.788	5.2	1.2	.8	.3	10.2

- ^{a} Statistics with the Atlanta Hawks.

=== Playoffs ===
Player	GP	GS	MPG	FG%	3P%	FT%	RPG	APG	SPG	BPG	PPG
Jason Collins	5	4	17.0	.545			2.4	.0	.2	.0	2.4
Erick Dampier	4	0	13.8	.538		.667	3.5	.0	.0	.2	4.0
Willie Green	5	0	12.6	.462	.250		1.6	.6	.0	.0	2.6
Kirk Hinrich	6	4	23.5	.433	.375	1.000	2.0	1.0	.7	.0	5.7
Al Horford	3	2	36.0	.588		.750	8.3	2.7	1.3	1.3	15.3
Ivan Johnson	5	0	10.8	.313	.000	.600	3.4	.0	.6	.0	2.6
Joe Johnson	6	4	40.5	.373	.250	.750	3.5	3.5	1.3	.2	17.2
Tracy McGrady	6	0	15.0	.385	.000	.833	2.8	1.0	.0	.3	4.2
Jannero Pargo	5	0	9.2	.286	.333		1.0	1.2	.4	.0	3.2
Vladimir Radmanović	2	0	7.5	.000	.000		.5	.5	.0	.0	.0
Josh Smith	5	4	39.2	.386	.000	.762	13.6	4.8	.6	1.0	16.8
Jeff Teague	6	4	37.5	.411	.412	.895	3.7	4.2	.8	.8	14.0
Marvin Williams	6	2	24.2	.356	.500	.778	5.5	.8	.5	.3	7.8

== Awards and milestones ==
- Joe Johnson was named Eastern Conference Player of the Week (March 19 – 25).
- Ivan Johnson was named Eastern Conference Rookie of the Month for April.

=== All-Star ===
- Joe Johnson was selected as a reserve for the East in the 2012 NBA All-Star Game and was scheduled to participate in the Three-Point Contest and Shooting Stars Competition but an injury didn't allow him to play. Rajon Rondo, Kevin Durant and teammate Jerry Stackhouse replaced him in each competition respectively.

== Injuries and disciplinary actions ==
- Kirk Hinrich missed the first 18 games of the regular season after having surgery on his left shoulder.
- On January, Al Horford underwent surgery to repair a torn left pectoral muscle and missed the remainder of the regular season.
- Ivan Johnson was fined $25,000 for making an obscene gesture to a fan after their Game 6 loss to the Boston Celtics in the playoffs.
- Hawks co-owner Michael Gearon Jr. received a $35,000 fine for comments made on Celtics forward Kevin Garnett and officials during the first round of the playoffs.

== Transactions ==
=== Overview ===
Players Added

Via draft

- Keith Benson (10-day contract)

Via free agency

- Erick Dampier
- Willie Green
- Ivan Johnson
- Tracy McGrady
- Jannero Pargo
- Vladimir Radmanović
- Donald Sloan (10-day contract)
- Jerry Stackhouse
Players Lost

Via free agency

- Damien Wilkins
- Jamal Crawford

Waived

- Keith Benson
- Magnum Rolle
- Pape Sy
- Donald Sloan

=== Trades ===
June 23, 2011	To Atlanta Hawks Cash considerations	To Golden State Warriors Conditional 2012 second round pick.

=== Free agents ===
Additions
Player	Date signed	Former team
Ivan Johnson	December 9	Qingdao Doublestar (China)
Tracy McGrady	December 9	Detroit Pistons
Vladimir Radmanović	December 9	Golden State Warriors
Donald Sloan (10-day contract)	December 9	Erie BayHawks (D-League)
Jerry Stackhouse	December 9	Miami Heat
Jannero Pargo	December 20	Chicago Bulls
Willie Green	December 22	New Orleans Hornets
Erick Dampier	March 1	Miami Heat

Subtractions
Player	Date signed	New team
Damien Wilkins	December 9	Detroit Pistons
Jamal Crawford	December 15	Portland Trail Blazers

Many players signed with teams from other leagues due to the 2011 NBA lockout. FIBA allows players under NBA contracts to sign and play for teams from other leagues if the contracts have opt-out clauses that allow the players to return to the NBA if the lockout ends. The Chinese Basketball Association, however, only allows its clubs to sign foreign free agents who could play for at least the entire season.

Played in other leagues during lockout
Player	Date signed	New team	Opt-out clause
Hilton Armstrong	June 30	ASVEL Basket (France)	No
Magnum Rolle	July 27	Changwon LG Sakers (South Korea)	Yes
Pape Sy	August 26	BCM Gravelines (France)	Yes
Josh Powell	September 5	Liaoning Dinosaurs (China)	No
Zaza Pachulia	October 7	Galatasaray Medical Park (Turkey)	Yes

== See also ==
2011–12 NBA season
