= 2010–11 Atlanta Hawks season =

NBA professional basketball team season

- Head coach: Larry Drew
- Owners: Atlanta Spirit LLC
- Arena: Philips Arena

Results
- Record: 44–38 (.537)
- Place: Division: 3rd (Southeast); Conference: 5th (Eastern)
- Playoff finish: Conference Semifinals (lost to Bulls 2–4)
- Stats at Basketball Reference

Local media
- Television: Fox Sports South, SportSouth
- Radio: 99X

The 2010–11 Atlanta Hawks season was the 62nd season of the Atlanta Hawks franchise in the National Basketball Association (NBA), and the 43rd in Atlanta.

== Key dates ==
- June 24 – The 2010 NBA draft was held in New York City.
- July 1 – The free agency period began.

== Draft picks ==
Round	Pick	Player	Position	Nationality	College
1	24	Damion James (traded to New Jersey)	SF	United States	Texas
2	53	Pape Sy	SF	France	STB Le Havre (France)

== Roster ==
2010–11 Atlanta Hawks roster
Players

Pos.	No.	Player	Height	Weight	DOB	From
F/C	31	Hilton Armstrong	6 ft 11 in (2.11 m)	235 lb (107 kg)		Connecticut
C	34	Jason Collins	7 ft 0 in (2.13 m)	255 lb (116 kg)		Stanford
G	11	Jamal Crawford	6 ft 5 in (1.96 m)	200 lb (91 kg)		Michigan
G	6	Kirk Hinrich	6 ft 4 in (1.93 m)	190 lb (86 kg)		Kansas
F/C	15	Al Horford	6 ft 10 in (2.08 m)	245 lb (111 kg)		Florida
G	2	Joe Johnson	6 ft 7 in (2.01 m)	240 lb (109 kg)		Arkansas
C	27	Zaza Pachulia	6 ft 11 in (2.11 m)	275 lb (125 kg)		Georgia (country)
F	12	Josh Powell	6 ft 9 in (2.06 m)	240 lb (109 kg)		NC State
F	25	Magnum Rolle	6 ft 11 in (2.11 m)	225 lb (102 kg)		Louisiana Tech
F	5	Josh Smith	6 ft 9 in (2.06 m)	240 lb (109 kg)		Oak Hill Academy
G/F	19	Pape Sy	6 ft 7 in (2.01 m)	225 lb (102 kg)		France
G	0	Jeff Teague	6 ft 2 in (1.88 m)	180 lb (82 kg)		Wake Forest
C	36	Etan Thomas	6 ft 10 in (2.08 m)	260 lb (118 kg)		Syracuse
G/F	3	Damien Wilkins	6 ft 6 in (1.98 m)	225 lb (102 kg)		Georgia
F	24	Marvin Williams	6 ft 9 in (2.06 m)	240 lb (109 kg)		North Carolina

Coaches
Head coach
- Larry Drew
Assistant(s)
- Lester Conner
- Bob Bender
- Kenny Gattison
- Tyrone Hill
- Pete Radulovic

Legend
- (DP) Unsigned draft pick
- (FA) Free agent
- (S) Suspended
- Injured

== Pre-season ==
=== Game log ===
2010 pre-season game log
Pre-season: 2–5 (home: 1–2; road: 1–3)

Game	Date	Team	Score	High points	High rebounds	High assists	Location Attendance	Record
1	October 7	Memphis	L 111–115 (OT)	Jeff Teague (20)	Marvin Williams (10)	Jeff Teague (6)	Philips Arena; 7,132	0–1
2	October 11	@ Detroit	L 85–94	Jordan Crawford (20)	Josh Smith (7)	Jordan Crawford (7)	The Palace of Auburn Hills; 10,591	0–2
3	October 12	@ Washington	L 92–107	Jordan Crawford (30)	Zaza Pachulia (6)	Jordan Crawford (5)	Verizon Center; 9,230	0–3
4	October 16	@ New Orleans	W 84–74	Joe Johnson (22)	Al Horford (9)	Jamal Crawford (5)	Mountain States Health Alliance Athletic Center; 5,933	1–3
5	October 18	Orlando	L 73–102	Josh Powell (13)	Josh Smith (7)	Joe Johnson (4)	Philips Arena; 7,571	1–4
6	October 21	Miami	W 98–89	Joe Johnson (27)	Marvin Williams (11)	Joe Johnson (6)	Philips Arena; 15,197	2–4
7	October 22	@ Charlotte	L 66–99	Jamal Crawford (15)	Josh Powell (8)	Jamal Crawford (4)	Time Warner Cable Arena; 8,849	2–5

2010–11 season schedule

== Regular season ==
=== Standings ===
Southeast Division	W	L	PCT	GB	Home	Road	Div
y-Miami Heat	58	24	.707	–	30–11	28–13	13–3
x-Orlando Magic	52	30	.634	6	29–12	23–18	11–5
x-Atlanta Hawks	44	38	.537	14	24–17	20–21	9–7
Charlotte Bobcats	34	48	.415	24	21–20	13–28	4–12
Washington Wizards	23	59	.280	35	20–21	3–38	3–13

#	Eastern Conference				
#	Team	W	L	PCT	GB
1	z-Chicago Bulls	62	20	.756	–
2	y-Miami Heat	58	24	.707	4
3	y-Boston Celtics	56	26	.683	6
4	x-Orlando Magic	52	30	.634	10
5	x-Atlanta Hawks	44	38	.537	18
6	x-New York Knicks	42	40	.512	20
7	x-Philadelphia 76ers	41	41	.500	21
8	x-Indiana Pacers	37	45	.451	25
9	Milwaukee Bucks	35	47	.427	27
10	Charlotte Bobcats	34	48	.415	28
11	Detroit Pistons	30	52	.366	32
12	New Jersey Nets	24	58	.293	38
13	Washington Wizards	23	59	.280	39
14	Toronto Raptors	22	60	.268	40
15	Cleveland Cavaliers	19	63	.232	43

=== Game log ===
2010–11 game log
Total: 44–38 (home: 24–17; road: 20–21)
October: 3–0 (home: 1–0; road: 2–0)

Game	Date	Team	Score	High points	High rebounds	High assists	Location Attendance	Record
1	October 27	@ Memphis	W 119–104	Joe Johnson (22)	Zaza Pachulia (11)	Joe Johnson (7)	FedExForum; 17,519	1–0
2	October 29	@ Philadelphia	W 104–101	Joe Johnson (22)	Al Horford (12)	Mike Bibby (6)	Wells Fargo Center; 10,960	2–0
3	October 30	Washington	W 99–95	Joe Johnson (25)	Josh Smith, Al Horford (10)	Mike Bibby (4)	Philips Arena; 18,729	3–0

November: 8–7 (home: 3–5; road: 5–2)

Game	Date	Team	Score	High points	High rebounds	High assists	Location Attendance	Record
4	November 2	@ Cleveland	W 100–88	Marvin Williams (22)	Al Horford (12)	Joe Johnson (9)	Quicken Loans Arena; 20,562	4–0
5	November 3	Detroit	W 94–85	Josh Smith (22)	Josh Smith (11)	Joe Johnson (8)	Philips Arena; 13,003	5–0
6	November 5	@ Minnesota	W 113–103	Josh Smith, Jamal Crawford (20)	Al Horford (12)	Josh Smith (6)	Target Center; 17,222	6–0
7	November 7	Phoenix	L 114–118	Joe Johnson (34)	Al Horford (10)	Joe Johnson (6)	Philips Arena; 13,395	6–1
8	November 8	@ Orlando	L 89–93	Joe Johnson (23)	Josh Smith (13)	Josh Smith (6)	Amway Center; 18,846	6–2
9	November 10	Milwaukee	L 91–108	Zaza Pachulia (16)	Josh Smith (8)	Jamal Crawford (5)	Philips Arena; 11,211	6–3
10	November 12	Utah	L 86–90	Joe Johnson (23)	Josh Smith (13)	Al Horford, Josh Smith (5)	Philips Arena; 17,069	6–4
11	November 14	Minnesota	W 111–105	Al Horford (28)	Al Horford, Josh Smith (10)	Joe Johnson (5)	Philips Arena; 12,027	7–4
12	November 16	@ Indiana	W 102–92	Josh Smith (25)	Josh Smith (8)	Mike Bibby (7)	Conseco Fieldhouse; 11,133	8–4
13	November 20	Dallas	L 93–98	Josh Smith (21)	Al Horford (20)	Jamal Crawford (7)	Philips Arena; 14,143	8–5
14	November 22	Boston	L 76–99	Mike Bibby (11)	Jordan Crawford (7)	Jamal Crawford (6)	Philips Arena; 14,476	8–6
15	November 23	@ New Jersey	L 101–107 (OT)	Jamal Crawford (21)	Al Horford (10)	Joe Johnson (8)	Prudential Center; 13,010	8–7
16	November 25	Washington	W 116–96	Joe Johnson (21)	Josh Smith (14)	Mike Bibby (6)	Philips Arena; 15,042	9–7
17	November 27	@ New York	W 99–90	Jamal Crawford (21)	Joe Johnson (10)	Joe Johnson (7)	Madison Square Garden; 19,763	10–7
18	November 28	@ Toronto	W 96–78	Marvin Williams (17)	Josh Smith (13)	Josh Smith (10)	Air Canada Centre; 17,302	11–7

December: 10–7 (home: 8–0; road: 2–7)

Game	Date	Team	Score	High points	High rebounds	High assists	Location Attendance	Record
19	December 1	Memphis	W 112–109	Al Horford (20)	Josh Smith (8)	Jamal Crawford (8)	Philips Arena; 11,513	12–7
20	December 3	Philadelphia	W 93–88	Marvin Williams (22)	Al Horford (13)	Al Horford (6)	Philips Arena; 12,140	13–7
21	December 4	@ Miami	L 77–89	Al Horford (22)	Al Horford (9)	Mike Bibby (6)	American Airlines Arena; 19,600	13–8
22	December 6	@ Orlando	W 80–74	Josh Smith (19)	Josh Smith (13)	Mike Bibby (7)	Amway Center; 18,846	14–8
23	December 7	New Jersey	W 116–101	Josh Smith (34)	Al Horford (10)	Josh Smith (7)	Philips Arena; 14,273	15–8
24	December 10	@ San Antonio	L 92–108	Jamal Crawford (23)	Al Horford (9)	Jamal Crawford, Josh Smith (5)	AT&T Center; 17,576	15–9
25	December 11	Indiana	W 97–83	Josh Smith (21)	Al Horford (16)	Al Horford (8)	Philips Arena; 14,131	16–9
26	December 14	@ Detroit	L 80–103	Josh Smith (26)	Al Horford (12)	Mike Bibby (6)	The Palace of Auburn Hills; 12,526	16–10
27	December 16	@ Boston	L 90–102	Marvin Williams (26)	Al Horford (7)	Mike Bibby (8)	TD Garden; 18,624	16–11
28	December 17	Charlotte	W 90–85	Joe Johnson, Al Horford, Marvin Williams (16)	Josh Smith (11)	Joe Johnson (8)	Philips Arena; 15,006	17–11
29	December 19	@ New Jersey	L 82–89	Mike Bibby (19)	Al Horford, Josh Smith (10)	Joe Johnson (6)	Prudential Center; 11,295	17–12
30	December 20	Orlando	W 91–81	Al Horford (24)	Al Horford (11)	Joe Johnson (6)	Philips Arena; 16,275	18–12
31	December 22	Cleveland	W 98–84	Joe Johnson (23)	Josh Smith (11)	Joe Johnson (7)	Philips Arena; 12,610	19–12
32	December 26	@ New Orleans	L 86–93	Joe Johnson (23)	Josh Smith (12)	Mike Bibby (5)	New Orleans Arena; 15,626	19–13
33	December 27	@ Milwaukee	W 95–80	Al Horford (18)	Jason Collins, Al Horford (12)	Joe Johnson (6)	Bradley Center; 16,751	20–13
34	December 29	Golden State	W 103–93	Josh Smith (22)	Al Horford (15)	Joe Johnson (8)	Philips Arena; 15,925	21–13
35	December 31	@ Oklahoma City	L 94–103	Jamal Crawford (26)	Josh Smith (9)	Joe Johnson (11)	Oklahoma City Arena; 18,203	21–14

January: 9–4 (home: 3–2; road: 6–2)

Game	Date	Team	Score	High points	High rebounds	High assists	Location Attendance	Record
36	January 2	@ L.A. Clippers	W 107–98	Joe Johnson (29)	Al Horford, Josh Smith (10)	Mike Bibby, Jamal Crawford, Joe Johnson (4)	Staples Center; 16,750	22–14
37	January 4	@ Sacramento	W 108–102	Jamal Crawford (31)	Josh Smith (11)	Jamal Crawford (7)	ARCO Arena; 11,472	23–14
38	January 5	@ Utah	W 110–87	Joe Johnson (28)	Al Horford (8)	Mike Bibby (8)	EnergySolutions Arena; 19,911	24–14
39	January 8	Indiana	W 108–93	Josh Smith (27)	Al Horford, Josh Smith (10)	Al Horford, Joe Johnson, Josh Smith (6)	Philips Arena; 13,547	25–14
40	January 12	@ Toronto	W 104–101	Jamal Crawford (36)	Al Horford (13)	Mike Bibby, Josh Smith (4)	Air Canada Centre; 14,186	26–14
41	January 15	Houston	L 106–112	Joe Johnson (30)	Josh Smith (12)	Al Horford (8)	Philips Arena; 13,420	26–15
42	January 17	Sacramento	W 100–98	Joe Johnson (36)	Josh Smith (10)	Jamal Crawford (7)	Philips Arena; 14,820	27–15
43	January 18	@ Miami	W 93–89 (OT)	Jamal Crawford, Joe Johnson (19)	Josh Smith (12)	Joe Johnson (10)	American Airlines Arena; 19,600	28–15
44	January 21	New Orleans	L 59–100	Jamal Crawford (14)	Josh Smith (8)	Joe Johnson, Jeff Teague (3)	Philips Arena; 14,875	28–16
45	January 22	@ Charlotte	W 103–87	Joe Johnson (32)	Mike Bibby, Zaza Pachulia (8)	Joe Johnson (5)	Time Warner Cable Arena; 17,286	29–16
46	January 26	@ Milwaukee	L 90–98	Jamal Crawford (20)	Josh Smith (11)	Al Horford (5)	Bradley Center; 13,274	29–17
47	January 28	New York	W 111–102	Joe Johnson (34)	Al Horford (14)	Joe Johnson (7)	Philips Arena; 19,069	30–17
48	January 29	@ Dallas	L 91–102	Joe Johnson (27)	Al Horford (9)	Joe Johnson (6)	American Airlines Center; 20,309	30–18

February: 6–6 (home: 2–2; road: 4–4)

Game	Date	Team	Score	High points	High rebounds	High assists	Location Attendance	Record
49	February 2	Toronto	W 100–87	Joe Johnson (37)	Al Horford (14)	Joe Johnson (8)	Philips Arena; 14,025	31–18
50	February 4	L.A. Clippers	W 101–100	Jamal Crawford (34)	Al Horford (12)	Joe Johnson (9)	Philips Arena; 19,363	32–18
51	February 5	@ Washington	W 99–92	Josh Smith (29)	Josh Smith (16)	Jamal Crawford (5)	Verizon Center; 16,256	33–18
52	February 8	Philadelphia	L 83–117	Josh Smith (16)	Marvin Williams (10)	Josh Smith (7)	Philips Arena; 12,903	33–19
53	February 12	Charlotte	L 86–88	Josh Smith (28)	Al Horford (10)	Jamal Crawford (7)	Philips Arena; 16,948	33–20
54	February 14	@ Detroit	W 94–79	Josh Smith (27)	Josh Smith (14)	Mike Bibby (7)	The Palace of Auburn Hills; 11,844	34–20
55	February 16	@ New York	L 90–102	Marvin Williams (17)	Al Horford (11)	Joe Johnson (6)	Madison Square Garden; 19,763	34–21
All-Star Break
56	February 22	@ L.A. Lakers	L 80–104	Joe Johnson (14)	Al Horford, Josh Smith (6)	Joe Johnson (4)	Staples Center; 18,997	34–22
57	February 23	@ Phoenix	L 97–105	Josh Smith (26)	Al Horford (9)	Al Horford, Josh Smith (4)	US Airways Center; 18,254	34–23
58	February 25	@ Golden State	W 95–79	Josh Smith (26)	Al Horford (13)	Al Horford (7)	Oracle Arena; 19,858	35–23
59	February 27	@ Portland	W 90–83	Jamal Crawford (23)	Zaza Pachulia (12)	Josh Smith (4)	Rose Garden; 20,642	36–23
60	February 28	@ Denver	L 90–100	Joe Johnson (22)	Al Horford (16)	Al Horford (4)	Pepsi Center; 16,163	36–24

March: 7–8 (home: 6–6; road: 1–2)

Game	Date	Team	Score	High points	High rebounds	High assists	Location Attendance	Record
61	March 2	Chicago	W 83–80	Al Horford (31)	Al Horford (16)	Joe Johnson (9)	Philips Arena; 16,928	37–24
62	March 4	Oklahoma City	L 104–111	Joe Johnson (24)	Al Horford (12)	Jamal Crawford (5)	Philips Arena; 17,916	37–25
63	March 6	New York	L 79–92	Josh Smith (17)	Josh Smith (11)	Al Horford (5)	Philips Arena; 19,560	37–26
64	March 8	L.A. Lakers	L 87–101	Al Horford (17)	Zaza Pachulia (10)	Josh Smith (6)	Philips Arena; 19,890	37–27
65	March 11	@ Chicago	L 76–94	Joe Johnson (16)	Al Horford (7)	Al Horford (5)	United Center; 22,123	37–28
66	March 12	Portland	W 91–82	Jeff Teague (24)	Josh Smith (12)	Josh Smith (6)	Philips Arena; 15,522	38–28
67	March 15	Milwaukee	W 110–85	Joe Johnson (36)	Josh Smith (14)	Jamal Crawford (8)	Philips Arena; 13,590	39–28
68	March 16	Denver	L 87–102	Zaza Pachulia (19)	Zaza Pachulia (10)	Al Horford (6)	Philips Arena; 14,669	39–29
69	March 18	Miami	L 85–106	Marvin Williams (15)	Joe Johnson, Zaza Pachulia (5)	Jeff Teague (6)	Philips Arena; 20,024	39–30
70	March 20	Detroit	W 104–96	Al Horford (18)	Al Horford (10)	Joe Johnson (8)	Philips Arena; 17,580	40–30
71	March 22	Chicago	L 81–114	Jeff Teague (20)	Joe Johnson (5)	Kirk Hinrich (5)	Philips Arena; 18,203	40–31
72	March 23	@ Philadelphia	L 100–105	Josh Smith (30)	Josh Smith (12)	Kirk Hinrich (8)	Wells Fargo Center; 15,199	40–32
73	March 26	New Jersey	W 98–87	Al Horford (23)	Al Horford (12)	Jamal Crawford (6)	Philips Arena; 17,093	41–32
74	March 27	@ Cleveland	W 99–83	Marvin Williams (31)	Josh Smith (18)	Josh Smith (8)	Quicken Loans Arena; 20,226	42–32
75	March 30	Orlando	W 85–82	Josh Smith (26)	Al Horford (9)	Kirk Hinrich, Al Horford (5)	Philips Arena; 15,114	43–32

April: 1–6 (home: 1–2; road: 0–4)

Game	Date	Team	Score	High points	High rebounds	High assists	Location Attendance	Record
76	April 1	Boston	W 88–83	Jamal Crawford (20)	Al Horford (15)	Jamal Crawford, Al Horford (4)	Philips Arena; 19,763	44–32
77	April 3	@ Houston	L 109–114	Joe Johnson (25)	Josh Smith (11)	Joe Johnson, Josh Smith (7)	Toyota Center; 15,993	44–33
78	April 5	San Antonio	L 90–97	Joe Johnson (21)	Al Horford (9)	Al Horford (5)	Philips Arena; 17,277	44–34
79	April 8	@ Indiana	L 102–114	Jeff Teague (21)	Zaza Pachulia (11)	Jamal Crawford (3)	Conseco Fieldhouse; 15,879	44–35
80	April 9	@ Washington	L 83–115	Al Horford (21)	Al Horford (10)	Jeff Teague (5)	Verizon Center; 19,771	44–36
81	April 11	Miami	L 90–98	Josh Smith (17)	Al Horford, Josh Smith (6)	Joe Johnson (5)	Philips Arena; 18,529	44–37
82	April 13	@ Charlotte	L 85–96	Josh Powell (16)	Zaza Pachulia (10)	Jamal Crawford, Kirk Hinrich, Zaza Pachulia, Pape Sy, Damien Wilkins, Marvin Williams (2)	Time Warner Cable Arena; 16,138	44–38

2010–11 season schedule

== Playoffs ==
=== Game log ===
2011 playoff game log
First Round: 4–2 (home: 3–0; road: 1–2)

Game	Date	Team	Score	High points	High rebounds	High assists	Location Attendance	Series
1	April 16	@ Orlando	W 103–93	Joe Johnson (25)	Josh Smith (8)	Jamal Crawford, Joe Johnson (5)	Amway Center; 19,108	1–0
2	April 19	@ Orlando	L 82–88	Jamal Crawford (25)	Al Horford (10)	Joe Johnson (5)	Amway Center; 19,160	1–1
3	April 22	Orlando	W 88–84	Jamal Crawford (23)	Josh Smith (10)	Joe Johnson (5)	Philips Arena; 19,865	2–1
4	April 24	Orlando	W 88–85	Jamal Crawford (25)	Al Horford (12)	Jamal Crawford (6)	Philips Arena; 19,490	3–1
5	April 26	@ Orlando	L 76–101	Josh Smith (22)	Al Horford (14)	Al Horford (6)	Amway Center; 19,091	3–2
6	April 28	Orlando	W 84–81	Joe Johnson (23)	Al Horford (12)	Al Horford (6)	Philips Arena; 19,282	4–2

Conference Semifinals: 2–4 (home: 1–2; road: 1–2)

Game	Date	Team	Score	High points	High rebounds	High assists	Location Attendance	Series
1	May 2	@ Chicago	W 103–95	Joe Johnson (34)	Al Horford (13)	Jeff Teague (5)	United Center; 22,890	1–0
2	May 4	@ Chicago	L 73–86	Jeff Teague (21)	Al Horford (14)	Al Horford (6)	United Center; 22,872	1–1
3	May 6	Chicago	L 82–99	Jeff Teague (21)	Josh Smith (13)	Josh Smith (4)	Philips Arena; 19,521	1–2
4	May 8	Chicago	W 100–88	Joe Johnson (24)	Josh Smith (16)	Josh Smith (8)	Philips Arena; 19,263	2–2
5	May 10	@ Chicago	L 83–95	Jeff Teague (21)	Al Horford (10)	Jeff Teague (7)	United Center; 22,980	2–3
6	May 12	Chicago	L 73–93	Joe Johnson (19)	Zaza Pachulia (13)	Joe Johnson (4)	Philips Arena; 19,378	2–4

2011 playoff schedule

== Player statistics ==
Legend
GP	Games played	GS	Games started	MPG	Minutes per game
FG%	Field-goal percentage	3P%	3-point field-goal percentage	FT%	Free-throw percentage
RPG	Rebounds per game	APG	Assists per game	SPG	Steals per game
BPG	Blocks per game	PPG	Points per game

=== Season ===
Player	GP	GS	MPG	FG%	3P%	FT%	RPG	APG	SPG	BPG	PPG
Hilton Armstrong*	12	0	6.3	.500	1.000	.200	1.4	0.3	.25	.42	1.3
Mike Bibby*	56	56	29.9	.435	.441	.630	2.6	3.6	.70	.10	9.4
Jason Collins	49	28	12.1	.479	1.000	.659	2.1	0.4	.18	.18	2.0
Jamal Crawford	76	0	30.2	.421	.341	.854	1.7	3.2	.75	.18	14.2
Jordan Crawford*	16	0	10.0	.351	.333	.667	1.8	0.9	.20	.0	4.2
Maurice Evans*	47	12	17.8	.393	.315	.857	1.8	0.6	.30	.10	4.5
Kirk Hinrich*	24	22	28.6	.432	.421	.667	2.2	3.3	.79	.29	8.6
Al Horford	77	77	35.1	.557	.500	.798	9.3	3.5	.77	1.04	15.3
Joe Johnson	72	72	35.5	.443	.297	.802	4.0	4.7	.65	.10	18.2
Zaza Pachulia	79	7	15.7	.461	.000	.754	4.2	0.7	.43	.28	4.4
Josh Powell	54	0	12.1	.452	.000	.800	2.5	0.4	.09	.09	4.1
Josh Smith	77	77	34.4	.477	.331	.725	8.5	3.3	1.29	1.56	16.5
Pape Sy	3	0	7.0	.333	.000	1.000	1.0	0.7	.33	.0	2.3
Jeff Teague	70	7	13.8	.438	.375	.794	1.5	2.0	.64	.36	5.2
Etan Thomas	13	0	6.3	.476	.0	.800	1.8	0.2	.08	.31	2.5
Damien Wilkins	52	0	13.0	.504	.200	.714	1.7	0.8	.52	.17	3.5
Marvin Williams	65	52	28.7	.458	.336	.845	4.8	1.4	.52	.35	10.4

* – Stats with the Hawks.

== Awards, records and milestones ==
=== Awards ===
==== All-Star ====
- Joe Johnson and Al Horford were selected as reserves for the Eastern Conference in the 2011 NBA All-Star Game. Johnson was selected for the fifth year in a row, while Horford received his second consecutive selection.
- Team Atlanta, consisting of current Hawks center Al Horford, Atlanta Dream guard Coco Miller, and former Hawks guard Steve Smith, won the Shooting Stars Competition on All-Star Saturday Night.

==== Season ====
- Al Horford was named to the All-NBA Third Team as center. It was his first All-NBA selection.

== Transactions ==
=== Trades ===
June 24, 2010
Three-team trade
To Atlanta Hawks----
- No. 27 pick (Jordan Crawford) (from Nets),
  cash considerations (from Thunder)
To New Jersey Nets----
- No. 24 pick (Damion James) (from Hawks)
To Oklahoma City Thunder----
- No. 31 pick (Tibor Pleiss) (from Hawks)

July 13, 2010
To Atlanta Hawks----
- 2012 second-round pick
To Phoenix Suns----
- Josh Childress (sign and trade)
February 23, 2011
To Atlanta Hawks----
- Kirk Hinrich
- Hilton Armstrong
To Washington Wizards----
- Mike Bibby
- Maurice Evans
- Jordan Crawford
- 2011 first-round pick

=== Free agents ===
==== Additions ====
Player	Signed	Former Team
Joe Johnson	Signed 6-year contract for $123 Million	Atlanta Hawks
Josh Powell	Signed 1-year contract for $1.1 Million	Los Angeles Lakers
Jason Collins	Terms undisclosed	Atlanta Hawks
Etan Thomas	Terms undisclosed	Oklahoma City Thunder
Damien Wilkins	Terms undisclosed	Minnesota Timberwolves
Magnum Rolle	Terms undisclosed	Maine Red Claws

a: Damien Wilkins was signed, waived, signed to two separate 10-day contracts, and finally signed for the remainder of the season.

==== Subtractions ====
Player	Reason Left	New Team
Damien Wilkins	Waived; First 10-day contract expired	Atlanta Hawks
