= 2007–08 Atlanta Hawks season =

Season of National Basketball Association team the Atlanta Hawks

- Head coach: Mike Woodson
- Owners: Atlanta Spirit LLC
- Arena: Philips Arena

Results
- Record: 37–45 (.451)
- Place: Division: 3rd (Southeast); Conference: 8th (Eastern)
- Playoff finish: First Round (lost to Celtics 3–4)
- Stats at Basketball Reference

Local media
- Television: FSN South; SportSouth
- Radio: WQXI

The 2007–08 Atlanta Hawks season was the 59th season for the Atlanta Hawks in the National Basketball Association, and their 40th season in Atlanta, Georgia.

== Season summary ==
=== Off-season ===
After missing the NBA playoffs for eight consecutive seasons, the Hawks received the third overall pick in the 2007 NBA draft, and selected center Al Horford from the University of Florida; the team also selected point guard Acie Law IV from the University of Texas A&M with the eleventh overall pick.

For the season, the Hawks updated their primary logo of a hawk holding a basketball, replacing the colors black, yellow and brown with navy blue and silver to their color scheme of red and white. The team's primary logo featured a red hawk with a silver beak and navy blue shadows on its wings, holding a silver basketball with navy blue seams. The team also changed the wordmark of the city and team names "Atlanta Hawks" above their logo, and changing the color of the wordmark from red to navy blue.

The Hawks also redesigned their home and road uniforms, which featured their new alternate logo of a red hawk's head with a silver beak and a navy blue outline on the right leg of their shorts. The white home uniforms featured the team name "Hawks" in navy blue letters with a red outline on the front of their jerseys, a red trim with navy blue underneath the collar, and navy blue side panels with red and silver outlines on their jerseys and shorts. The road uniforms were changed from red to navy blue, and featured the city name "Atlanta" in white letters with a red outline; the uniforms also featured a white trim with red underneath the collar, and red side panels with white and silver outlines.

The team's new primary logo, and new home and road uniforms would all remain in use until 2015. The home and road uniforms would be slightly redesigned in 2010, where the collar of their jerseys were changed to a V-shaped collar, and the silver shadows were removed from the jersey numbers.

=== Regular season ===
With the addition of Horford, the Hawks started the regular season by defeating the Dallas Mavericks at home, 101–94 at the Philips Arena in their season opener on November 2, 2007; it was the first time that the team won their first game of the regular season since the 1998–99 lockout season. The Hawks struggled losing seven of their first ten games, but then won seven of their next ten games afterwards, and posted a five-game winning streak in December, which led to a 15–12 start to the season. However, after an 18–17 start, the team struggled and fell below .500 in winning percentage, losing seven of their next eight games, and holding a 22–28 record at the All-Star break.

At mid-season, the Hawks traded Tyronn Lue, Anthony Johnson, second-year forward Shelden Williams, and Lorenzen Wright to the Sacramento Kings in exchange for Mike Bibby. Before the trade, Lue averaged 6.8 points per game in 33 games, while Johnson contributed 6.7 points and 4.8 assists per game in 42 games. The Hawks posted a six-game losing streak in February around the All-Star break, but later on posted another five-game winning streak between March and April, and finished in third place in the Southeast Division with a 37–45 record, which was a seven-game improvement over the previous season. Despite finishing four games below .500, the Hawks qualified for the NBA playoffs as the eighth seed in the Eastern Conference; it was the team's first playoff appearance since the 1998–99 season, ending an eight-year playoff drought.

Joe Johnson averaged 21.7 points and 5.8 assists per game, and led the Hawks with 169 three-point field-goals, while Josh Smith averaged 17.2 points, 8.2 rebounds, 1.5 steals and 2.8 blocks per game, and Marvin Williams provided the team with 14.8 points and 5.7 rebounds per game. In addition, Bibby contributed 14.1 points and 6.5 assists per game in 33 games after the trade, while sixth man Josh Childress provided with 11.8 points and 4.9 rebounds per game, and shot .571 in field-goal percentage off the bench, and Horford averaged 10.1 points and 9.7 rebounds per game, and was named to the NBA All-Rookie First Team. Meanwhile, Zaza Pachulia provided with 5.2 points and 4.0 rebounds per game, and Law contributed 4.2 points per game in 56 games.

During the NBA All-Star weekend at the New Orleans Arena in New Orleans, Louisiana, Joe Johnson was selected for the 2008 NBA All-Star Game, as a member of the Eastern Conference All-Star team. Meanwhile, Horford was selected for the NBA Rookie Challenge Game, as a member of the Rookies team; Horford scored 19 points along with 7 rebounds, despite the Rookies losing to the Sophomores team, 136–109. Smith finished in sixth place in Defensive Player of the Year voting, while Childress finished in sixth place in Sixth Man of the Year voting, and Horford finished in second place in Rookie of the Year voting, behind Kevin Durant of the Seattle SuperSonics.

The Hawks finished 20th in the NBA in home-game attendance, with an attendance of 667,518 at the Philips Arena during the regular season.

=== NBA playoffs ===
In the Eastern Conference First Round of the 2008 NBA playoffs, the Hawks faced off against the top–seeded, and Atlantic Division champion Boston Celtics, who were led by the All-Star trio of Paul Pierce, Defensive Player of the Year Kevin Garnett, and Ray Allen. The Hawks lost the first two games to the Celtics on the road at the TD Banknorth Garden, before winning their next two home games at the Philips Arena. The Hawks lost Game 5 to the Celtics at the TD Banknorth Garden by a score of 110–85, but managed to win Game 6 at the Philips Arena, 103–100 to even the series at 3–3. However, the Hawks lost Game 7 to the Celtics at the TD Banknorth Garden, 99–65, thus losing in a hard-fought seven-game series.

The Celtics would advance to the NBA Finals for the first time since the 1986–87 season, and defeat the Los Angeles Lakers in six games in the 2008 NBA Finals; it was their first NBA championship since the 1985–86 season. With their 37–45 record (.451 in winning percentage), the 2007–08 Hawks are the worst team record-wise to push an eventual NBA champion to an elimination game. Coincidentally, the 2013–14 Hawks would be the 8th–seeded team in the Eastern Conference with a 38–44 record, and force the top–seeded Indiana Pacers to a full seven-game series.

=== Aftermath ===
Following the season, Childress left to play overseas after four seasons with the Hawks.

== Draft picks ==
Atlanta's selections from the 2007 NBA draft in New York City.

Round	Pick	Player	Position	Nationality	College
1	3	Al Horford	Power forward/center	Dominican Republic	Florida
1	11	Acie Law IV	Point guard	United States	Texas A&M

== Roster ==
2007–08 Atlanta Hawks roster
Players

Pos.	No.	Player	Height	Weight	DOB	From
PG	10	Mike Bibby	6 ft 1 in (1.85 m)	190 lb (86 kg)		Arizona
SF	1	Josh Childress	6 ft 8 in (2.03 m)	210 lb (95 kg)		Stanford
PG	12	Speedy Claxton (IN)	5 ft 11 in (1.80 m)	166 lb (75 kg)		Hofstra
C	15	Al Horford	6 ft 10 in (2.08 m)	245 lb (111 kg)		Florida
SG	2	Joe Johnson	6 ft 7 in (2.01 m)	235 lb (107 kg)		Arkansas
PF	44	Solomon Jones	6 ft 10 in (2.08 m)	230 lb (104 kg)		South Florida
PG	4	Acie Law IV	6 ft 3 in (1.91 m)	195 lb (88 kg)		Texas A&M
C	27	Zaza Pachulia	6 ft 11 in (2.11 m)	280 lb (127 kg)		Republic of Georgia
SG	32	Jeremy Richardson	6 ft 7 in (2.01 m)	195 lb (88 kg)		Delta State
PF	5	Josh Smith	6 ft 9 in (2.06 m)	235 lb (107 kg)		Oak Hill Academy HS (VA)
SG	20	Salim Stoudamire	6 ft 1 in (1.85 m)	175 lb (79 kg)		Arizona
SG	6	Mario West	6 ft 5 in (1.96 m)	210 lb (95 kg)		Georgia Tech
SF	24	Marvin Williams	6 ft 9 in (2.06 m)	230 lb (104 kg)		North Carolina

Coaches
Head coach
- Mike Woodson
Assistant(s)
- Larry Drew
- Alton Lister
- Bob Bender
- David Fizdale

Legend
- (DP) Unsigned draft pick
- (FA) Free agent
- (S) Suspended
- Injured

Roster
Updated: 2008-02-19

== Regular season ==
=== Standings ===
Southeast Division	W	L	PCT	GB	Home	Road	Div
y-Orlando Magic	52	30	.634	–	25–16	27–14	12–4
x-Washington Wizards	43	39	.500	9	25–16	18–23	10–6
x-Atlanta Hawks	37	45	.451	15	25–16	12–29	9–7
Charlotte Bobcats	32	50	.390	20	21–20	11–30	7–9
Miami Heat	15	67	.183	37	9–32	6–35	2–14

Eastern Conference
#	Team	W	L	PCT	GB
1	z-Boston Celtics	66	16	.805	–
2	y-Detroit Pistons	59	23	.732	7
3	y-Orlando Magic	52	30	.634	14
4	x-Cleveland Cavaliers	45	37	.549	21
5	x-Washington Wizards	43	39	.524	23
6	x-Toronto Raptors	41	41	.500	25
7	x-Philadelphia 76ers	40	42	.488	26
8	x-Atlanta Hawks	37	45	.451	29
9	Indiana Pacers	36	46	.439	30
10	New Jersey Nets	34	48	.415	32
11	Chicago Bulls	33	49	.402	33
12	Charlotte Bobcats	32	50	.390	34
13	Milwaukee Bucks	26	56	.317	40
14	New York Knicks	23	59	.280	43
15	Miami Heat	15	67	.183	51

== Game log ==
2007–08 game log
Total: 37–45 (home: 25–16; road: 12–29)
November: 6–9 (home: 4–4; road: 2–5)

Game	Date	Team	Score	High points	High rebounds	High assists	Location Attendance	Record
1	November 2	Dallas	W 101–94	J. Johnson (28)	Smith (11)	J. Johnson, Lue, Smith (4)	Philips Arena; 19,767	1–0
2	November 4	@ Detroit	L 91–92	J. Johnson (23)	Horford (11)	J. Johnson (4)	The Palace of Auburn Hills; 22,076	1–1
3	November 6	@ New Jersey	W 82–87	Childress, Smith (18)	Childress, Horford, Smith (7)	Smith (6)	Izod Center; 12,336	1–2
4	November 7	Phoenix	W 105–96	Smith (22)	Horford (15)	J. Johnson (10)	Philips Arena; 19,855	2–2
5	November 9	@ Boston	L 83–106	J. Johnson, Horford (16)	Childress, Horford (7)	J. Johnson, Law (5)	TD Banknorth Garden; 18,624	2–3
6	November 11	Washington	L 90–101	Smith (23)	M. Williams (12)	M. Williams (6)	Philips Arena; 13,172	2–4
7	November 14	Charlotte	W 117–109	J. Johnson (34)	Horford (13)	J. Johnson (10)	Philips Arena; 12,239	3–4
8	November 16	Seattle	L 123–126	J. Johnson (39)	Horford (14)	J. Johnson (6)	Philips Arena; 13,534	3–5
9	November 17	@ Milwaukee	L 96–105	Smith (38)	Horford, M. Williams (8)	J. Johnson (9)	Bradley Center; 14,511	3–6
10	November 20	San Antonio	L 83–95	J. Johnson (20)	Horford (8)	A. Johnson (7)	Philips Arena; 17,025	3–7
11	November 21	@ Miami	W 82–79	J. Johnson (22)	J. Smith (11)	J. Johnson, Josh Smith (4)	American Airlines Arena; 19,600	4–7
12	November 24	@ Minnesota	W 98–87	J. Johnson (25)	J. Smith (8)	J. Johnson, J. Smith (5)	Target Center; 14,101	5–7
13	November 27	@ Chicago	L 78–90	J. Johnson (21)	A. Horford (14)	J. Johnson (5)	United Center; 21,826	5–8
14	November 28	Milwaukee	W 96–80	J. Johnson (21)	J. Smtih, Z. Pachulia (8)	J. Smith (7)	Philips Arena; 11,286	6–8
15	November 30	New Orleans	L 86–92	M. Williams (18)	A. Horford (15)	J. Johnson (9)	Philips Arena; 14,186	6–9

December: 9–4 (home: 6–2; road: 3–2)

Game	Date	Team	Score	High points	High rebounds	High assists	Location Attendance	Record
16	December 3	@ Philadelphia	W 88–79	J. Smtih (22)	A. Horford (13)	J. Johnson (7)	Wachovia Center; 11,465	7–9
17	December 4	Detroit	L 95–106	J. Childress (18)	A. Horford (10)	A. Johnson, S. Stoudamire (3)	Philips Arena; 12,754	7–10
18	December 6	Minnesota	W 90–89	J. Smith (28)	A. Horford (15)	A. Johnson (6)	Philips Arena; 12,232	8–10
19	December 8	Memphis	W 86–78	J. Smith (25)	A. Horford (14)	A. Johnson (8)	Philips Arena; 15,658	9–10
20	December 10	@ Orlando	W 98–87	J. Smith (25)	J. Smith (15)	J. Smith, A. Johnson (5)	Amway Arena; 16,821	10–10
21	December 11	Toronto	L 88–100	J. Johnson, M. Williams (23)	A. Horford (10)	A. Law (6)	Philips Arena; 13,173	10–11
22	December 14	@ Detroit	L 81–91	J. Johnson (23)	L. Wright (12)	A. Johnson, J. Smith (3)	The Palace of Auburn Hills; 22,076	10–12
23	December 15	Charlotte	W 93–84	J. Johnson (31)	J. Smith (10)	A. Johnson (7)	Philips Arena; 14,040	11–12
24	December 17	Utah	W 116–111	J. Johnson (26)	J. Smith (12)	A. Johnson (14)	Philips Arena; 15,263	12–12
25	December 19	Miami	W 114–111(OT)	M.Williams (26)	M.Williams (9)	A.Johnson, J.Johnson (9)	Philips Arena; 17,069	13–12
26	December 21	@ Washington	W 97–92	J. Johnson (32)	J. Smith (14)	J. Johnson, A. Johnson (8)	Verizon Center; 16,472	14–12
27	December 26	Indiana	W 107–95	J. Johnson (26)	S. Williams (10)	J. Johnson (11)	Philips Arena; 16,070	15–12
28	December 29	@ Dallas	L 84–97	M. Williams (18)	A. Horford (10)	J. Johnson (5)	American Airlines Center; 20,338	15–13

January: 4–11 (home: 3–3; road: 1–8)

Game	Date	Team	Score	High points	High rebounds	High assists	Location Attendance	Record
29	January 2	@ Cleveland	L 94–98	J. Johnson (24)	A. Horford (9)	A. Horford (3)	Quicken Loans Arena; 20,562	15–14
30	January 4	@ Indiana	L 91–113	J. Childress (26)	J. Childress (8)	M. West (3)	Conseco Fieldhouse; 10,797	15–15
31	January 5	New Jersey	L 107–113	J. Smith (34)	J. Smith (9)	A. Johnson (10)	Philips Arena; 15,766	15–16
32	January 9	Cleveland	W 90–81	J. Johnson (29)	A. Horford (15)	A. Johnson (6)	Philips Arena; 16,246	16–16
33	January 11	Washington	L 98–102	J. Smith (35)	A. Horford (19)	A. Johnson, J. Johnson (9)	Philips Arena; 16,064	16–17
34	January 13	Chicago	W 105–84	J. Johnson (37)	J. Johnson, J. Childress, A. Horford (9)	J. Johnson (6)	Philips Arena; 16,065	17–17
35	January 15	Denver	W 104–93	J. Johnson (22)	M. Williams (9)	A. Johnson (6)	Philips Arena; 18,235	18–17
36	January 16	@ Milwaukee	L 80–87	M. Williams (22)	A. Horford, J. Johnson (7)	A. Johnson (7)	Bradley Center; 14,506	18–18
37	January 18	@ Toronto	L 78–89	J. Johnson (25)	A. Horford, M. Williams, J. Smith (9)	J. Smith, J. Johnson (7)	Air Canada Centre; 19,800	18–19
38	January 21	Portland	L 109–111	J. Johnson (37)	J. Smith (17)	J. Johnson (7)	Philips Arena; 17,400	18–20
39	January 23	@ Denver	L 100–107	J. Smith (22)	J. Smith (12)	J. Smith (10)	Pepsi Center; 14,213	18–21
40	January 25	@ Seattle	W 99–90	M. Williams (33)	A. Horford (16)	J. Johnson (7)	KeyArena; 13,647	19–21
41	January 27	@ Portland	L 93–94	J. Johnson (19)	A. Horford (12)	A. Johnson (11)	Rose Garden; 20,438	19–22
42	January 29	@ Phoenix	L 92–125	M. Williams (18)	M. Williams, J. Johnson (8)	A. Law (4)	US Airways Center; 18,422	19–23
43	January 30	@ LA Clippers	L 88–95	J. Smith (21)	J. Smith, A. Horford (10)	J. Smith (8)	Staples Center; 14,874	19–24

February: 6–8 (home: 5–2; road: 1–6)

Game	Date	Team	Score	High points	High rebounds	High assists	Location Attendance	Record
44	February 2	New Jersey	W 104–92	M. Williams (24)	J. Smith (8)	A. Law (8)	Philips Arena; 18,102	20–24
45	February 4	Philadelphia	W 96–91	J. Childress (21)	A. Horford (8)	J. Smith (9)	Philips Arena; 14,563	21–24
46	February 6	LA Lakers	W 98–95	J. Johnson (28)	A. Horford (20)	J. Smith (9)	Philips Arena; 19,701	22–24
47	February 8	Cleveland	L 100–95	J. Johnson (23)	J. Smith (8)	J. Johnson (8)	Philips Arena; 19,335	22–25
48	February 9	@ Houston	L 108–89	J. Childress (21)	Z. Pachulia (9)	J. Johnson (4)	Toyota Center; 18,177	22–26
49	February 12	Detroit	L 94–90	J. Smith (30)	A. Horford (16)	J. Johnson (4)	Philips Arena; 18,227	22–27
50	February 13	@ Charlotte	L 100–98	J. Johnson (23)	A. Horford (14)	J. Johnson (4)	Charlotte Bobcats Arena; 11,213	22–28
51	February 19	@ LA Lakers	L 122–93	J. Johnson (18)	Z. Pachulia (12)	J. Smith (6)	Staples Center; 18,997	22–29
52	February 20	@ Sacramento	L 119–107	J. Childress (18)	A. Horford (12)	J. Johnson (4)	ARCO Arena; 13,641	22–30
53	February 22	@ Golden State	W 117–110	J. Johnson (27)	M. Williams (14)	J. Johnson (8)	Oracle Arena; 19,596	23–30
54	February 23	@ Utah	L 100–94	J. Smith (30)	J. Smith (12)	M. Bibby; J. Johnson (9)	EnergySolutions Arena; 19,911	23–31
55	February 25	@ San Antonio	L 89–74	J. Johnson (17)	A. Horford; J. Smith (13)	M. Bibby; J. Johnson (5)	AT&T Center; 18,113	23–32
56	February 27	Sacramento	W 123–117	J. Johnson (26)	A. Horford (14)	M. Bibby (12)	Philips Arena; 15,661	24–32
57	February 29	New York	W 99–93	J. Smith (25)	A. Horford (11)	M. Bibby (11)	Philips Arena; 18,339	25–32

March: 9–8 (home: 6–2; road: 3–6)

Game	Date	Team	Score	High points	High rebounds	High assists	Location Attendance	Record
58	March 2	@ Boston	L 98–88	J. Smith (22)	A. Horford (11)	M. Bibby (9)	TD Banknorth Garden; 18,624	25–33
59	March 4	Golden State	L 135–118	J. Johnson (38)	J. Smith (11)	M. Bibby; J. Johnson (6)	Philips Arena; 16,575	25–34
60	March 5	@ New Orleans	L 116–101	J. Johnson (24)	A. Horford (11)	M. Bibby; A. Horford (4)	New Orleans Arena; 12,430	25–35
61	March 7	@ Charlotte	L 108–93	J. Johnson (20)	A. Horford (11)	M. Bibby (10)	Charlotte Bobcats Arena; 15,203	25–36
62	March 8	Miami	W 97–94	J. Johnson (39)	J. Smith (8)	J. Johnson (8)	Philips Arena; 17,022	26–36
63	March 10	@ Orlando	L 123–112	J. Johnson (27)	J. Smith (12)	J. Johnson (11)	Amway Arena; 15,921	26–37
64	March 12	Houston	L 83–75	J. Johnson (28)	J. Smith (22)	M. Bibby; A. Horford (4)	Philips Arena; 17,078	26–38
65	March 14	LA Clippers	W 117–93	J. Johnson (28)	Z. Pachulia (10)	M. Bibby (14)	Philips Arena; 16,107	27–38
66	March 16	@ New York	W 109–98	J. Johnson (28)	A. Horford (10)	J. Johnson (11)	Madison Square Garden; 19,763	28–38
67	March 17	@ Washington	W 105–96	M. Bibby (23)	A. Horford (15)	J. Johnson (10)	Verizon Center; 16,227	29–38
68	March 19	@ New Jersey	L 125–117	J. Johnson (24)	A. Horford (15)	M. Bibby; A. Horford (6)	Izod Center; 14,102	29–39
69	March 22	Orlando	W 98–90	J. Johnson (34)	A. Horford (10)	M. Bibby (8)	Philips Arena; 18,825	30–39
70	March 25	@ Chicago	L 103–94	J.Childress (22)	A. Horford (13)	M. Bibby (7)	United Center; 21,806	30–40
71	March 26	Milwaukee	W 115–96	J. Johnson (28)	Z. Pachulia (8)	J. Johnson (8)	Philips Arena; 14,832	31–40
72	March 28	Chicago	W 106–103	M. Bibby (30)	M. Williams (11)	M. Bibby (8)	Philips Arena; 17,223	32–40
73	March 30	New York	W 114–109	M. Williams (27)	A. Horford (13)	J. Johnson (13)	Philips Arena; 16,573	33–40
74	March 31	@ Memphis	W 116–99	J. Smith (26)	J. Smith (8)	J. Johnson (8)	FedExForum; 10,281	34–40

April: 3–5 (home: 1–3; road: 2–2)

Game	Date	Team	Score	High points	High rebounds	High assists	Location Attendance	Record
75	April 2	Toronto	W 127–120	J. Johnson (28)	A. Horford (12)	M. Bibby (12)	Philips Arena; 14,691	35–40
76	April 4	Philadelphia	L 109–104	J.Johnson (32)	J.Smith (8)	M.Bibby (11)	Philips Arena; 18,729	35–41
77	April 5	@ Philadelphia	W 112–98	J.Johnson (30)	A.Horford (12)	J.Johnson (6)	Wachovia Center; 19,775	36–41
78	April 8	@ Indiana	L 92–85	J.Johnson (22)	J.Smith (13)	J.Johnson (4)	Conseco Fieldhouse; 10,876	36–42
79	April 11	@ New York	W 116–104	J.Johnson (34)	A.Horford (11)	J.Johnson (6)	Madison Square Garden; 19,763	37–42
80	April 12	Boston	L 99–89	J.Johnson (21)	A.Horford (11)	J.Johnson (8)	Philips Arena; 20,098	37–43
81	April 15	Orlando	L 121–105	M. Williams (16)	A.Horford (11)	A.Horford (6)	Philips Arena; 18,738	37–44
82	April 16	@ Miami	L 113–99	J.Smith (20)	A.Horford (12)	M.Bibby; J.Johnson (5)	American Airlines Arena; 19,073	37–45

2007–08 season schedule

(*)The final minute of the Miami game was played on March 8

== Player stats ==
Legend
GP	Games played	GS	Games started	MPG	Minutes per game
FG%	Field-goal percentage	3P%	3-point field-goal percentage	FT%	Free-throw percentage
RPG	Rebounds per game	APG	Assists per game	SPG	Steals per game
BPG	Blocks per game	PPG	Points per game

=== Regular season ===
Player	GP	GS	MPG	FG%	3P%	FT%	RPG	APG	SPG	BPG	PPG
Mike Bibby*	48	44	32.8	.411	.375	.780	3.3	6.0	1.13	.08	13.9
Josh Childress	76	0	29.9	.571	.367	.807	4.9	1.5	.93	.57	11.8
Al Horford	81	77	31.4	.499	.000	.731	9.7	1.5	.74	.94	10.1
Joe Johnson	82	82	40.8	.432	.381	.834	4.5	5.8	1.02	.22	21.7
Solomon Jones	35	0	4.1	.400	.000	.550	1.2	.0	.09	.14	1.0
Acie Law IV	56	6	15.4	.401	.206	.792	1.0	2.0	.52	.00	4.2
Zaza Pachulia	62	5	15.2	.437	.000	.706	4.0	.6	.39	.21	5.2
Jeremy Richardson*	27	1	4.9	.364	.368	1.000	.3	.1	.11	.00	1.5
Josh Smith	81	81	35.5	.457	.253	.710	8.2	3.4	1.52	2.80	17.2
Salim Stoudamire	35	0	11.5	.361	.341	.820	.7	.8	.20	.14	5.7
Mario West	64	2	4.2	.429	.000	.654	.8	.2	.19	.06	.9
Marvin Williams	80	80	34.6	.462	.100	.822	5.7	1.7	1.01	.41	14.8

*Total for entire season including previous team(s)

Player statistics citation:

=== Playoffs ===
2008 playoff game log
First Round: 3–4 (home: 3–0; road: 0–4)

Game	Date	Team	Score	High points	High rebounds	High assists	Location Attendance	Series
1	April 20	@ Boston	81–104	A. Horford (20)	A. Horford (10)	J. Johnson (7)	TD Banknorth Garden; 18,624	0–1
2	April 23	@ Boston	77–96	Two-Way Tie (13)	A. Horford (9)	Two-Way Tie (3)	TD Banknorth Garden; 18,624	0–2
3	April 26	Boston	102–93	J. Smith (27)	A. Horford (10)	M. Bibby (8)	Philips Arena; 19,725	1–2
4	April 28	Boston	97–92	J. Johnson (35)	A. Horford (13)	J. Johnson (6)	Philips Arena; 20,016	2–2
5	April 30	@ Boston	85–110	J. Johnson (21)	A. Horford (10)	A. Horford (5)	TD Banknorth Garden; 18,624	2–3
6	May 2	Boston	103–100	M. Williams (18)	Four-Way Tie (6)	M. Bibby (7)	Philips Arena; 20,425	3–3
7	May 4	@ Boston	65–99	J. Johnson (16)	A. Horford (12)	A. Horford (3)	TD Banknorth Garden; 18,624	3–4

2008 playoff schedule

Legend
GP	Games played	GS	Games started	MPG	Minutes per game
FG%	Field-goal percentage	3P%	3-point field-goal percentage	FT%	Free-throw percentage
RPG	Rebounds per game	APG	Assists per game	SPG	Steals per game
BPG	Blocks per game	PPG	Points per game

Player	GP	GS	MPG	FG%	3P%	FT%	RPG	APG	SPG	BPG	PPG
Mike Bibby	7	7	36.0	.338	.292	.656	3.1	3.1	.57	.29	10.3
Josh Childress	7	0	29.3	.524	.000	.500	5.7	1.6	.14	.71	7.1
Al Horford	7	7	39.6	.472	.000	.741	10.4	3.6	.43	1.00	12.6
Joe Johnson	7	7	39.3	.409	.444	.909	3.9	4.0	.29	.00	20.0
Solomon Jones	7	0	4.1	.200	.000	.000	1.1	.1	.14	.43	.6
Acie Law IV	7	0	8.7	.750	.000	.900	.3	1.1	.29	.00	3.0
Zaza Pachulia	7	0	15.0	.280	.000	.714	2.9	.3	.29	.00	4.1
Jeremy Richardson	3	0	2.0	.250	.000	.000	.0	.0	.00	.00	.7
Josh Smith	7	7	33.9	.398	.167	.841	6.4	2.9	1.71	2.86	15.7
Salim Stoudamire	3	0	9.3	.444	.333	1.000	.3	.0	.33	.00	4.0
Mario West	6	0	1.0	.333	.000	.000	.3	.0	.00	.00	.3
Marvin Williams	7	7	28.4	.414	.000	.889	4.0	.7	.29	.43	11.4

Player statistics citation:

== Awards and records ==
- Joe Johnson, selected for the NBA All-Star Game
- Al Horford, selected to participate in the T-Mobile Rookie Challenge
- Al Horford, named to the NBA All-Rookie First Team
- Al Horford, named November Eastern Conference Rookie of the Month
- Joe Johnson, named NBA Player of the Week
- Al Horford, named February Eastern Conferenced Rookie of the Month
- Joe Johnson, named March Eastern Conference Player of the Month

== Transactions ==
The Hawks have been involved in the following transactions during the 2007–08 season.

=== Trades ===
February 16, 2008	To Atlanta Hawks Mike Bibby	To Sacramento Kings Anthony Johnson, Tyronn Lue, Shelden Williams, Lorenzen Wright and Atlanta's 2008 2nd-round draft pick

Player transactions citation:

== See also ==
- 2007–08 NBA season
