= Josh Childress =

American basketball player (born 1983)

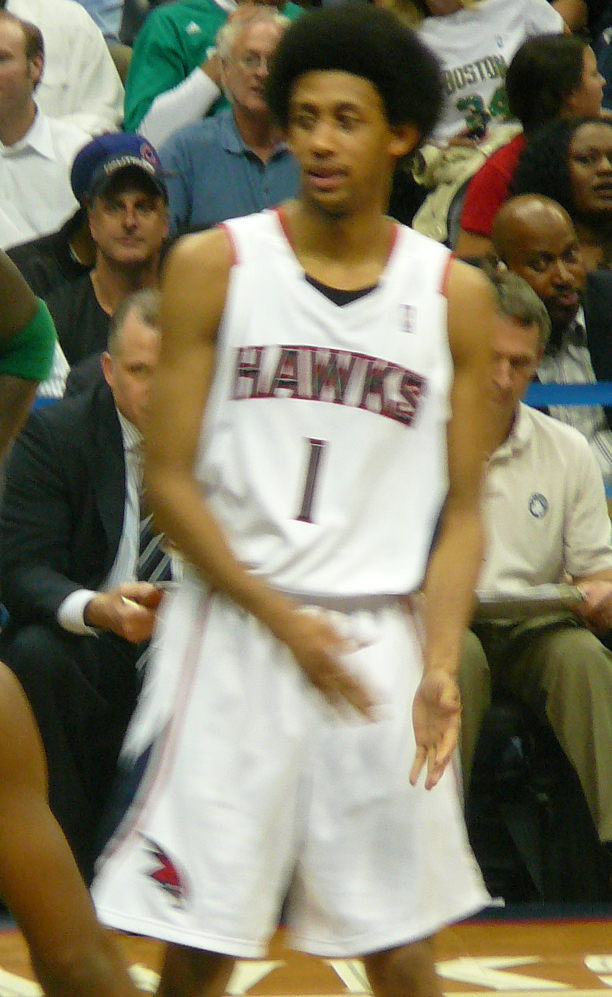
- Childress with the Atlanta Hawks in 2008

Personal information
- Born: June 20, 1983 (age 43) Los Angeles, California, U.S.
- Listed height: 6 ft 8 in (2.03 m)
- Listed weight: 210 lb (95 kg)

Career information
- High school: Mayfair (Lakewood, California)
- College: Stanford (2001–2004)
- NBA draft: 2004: 1st round, 6th overall pick
- Drafted by: Atlanta Hawks
- Playing career: 2004–2019
- Position: Small forward / shooting guard
- Number: 1, 2, 6, 8

Career history
- 2004–2008: Atlanta Hawks
- 2008–2010: Olympiacos
- 2010–2012: Phoenix Suns
- 2012: Brooklyn Nets
- 2013: New Orleans Pelicans
- 2014–2016: Sydney Kings
- 2016: Texas Legends
- 2016–2017: San-en NeoPhoenix
- 2017–2018: Adelaide 36ers
- 2018–2019: San-en NeoPhoenix

Career highlights
- All-NBL First Team (2015); NBL Top Scorer (2015); All-EuroLeague Second Team (2010); Greek Cup winner (2010); All-Greek League Team (2010); Greek League Top Scorer (2010); Greek All-Star (2010); NBA All-Rookie Second Team (2005); Consensus second-team All-American (2004); Pac-10 Player of the Year (2004); First-team All-Pac-10 (2004); Pac-10 Tournament MVP (2004); Third-team Parade All-American (2001); McDonald's All-American (2001)
- Stats at NBA.com
- Stats at Basketball Reference

Joshua Malik Childress (born June 20, 1983) is an American former professional basketball player. An All-EuroLeague Second Team member in 2010, he played with the Atlanta Hawks, Phoenix Suns, Brooklyn Nets, and New Orleans Pelicans of the National Basketball Association (NBA), and Olympiacos Piraeus of the Greek Basket League and EuroLeague.

== Early life ==
Childress grew up in Compton, California where he and his brother, Chris, played basketball and did their best to stay out of trouble. The neighborhood they lived in was very tight and supportive, but they lived under constant threat of gangsters in the area. Childress attended Mayfair High School in nearby Lakewood, overlapping with MLB All-Star Justin Turner. Besides playing basketball in high school and being named a McDonald's High School All-American, he also played volleyball during his senior year. He led his high school volleyball team, the Monsoons, to an undefeated record and he was voted to the All-League volleyball team. Josh has his #22 jersey retired at Mayfair.

== College career ==
Childress played three seasons of college basketball with Stanford, where he was named an AP first team All-American, an All-American Consensus second team honoree, the Pac-10 Conference Player of the Year and the Pac-10 Conference tournament MVP as a junior in 2004. He then declared for the 2004 NBA draft where he was selected by the Atlanta Hawks with the sixth overall pick, becoming the highest Stanford player to be drafted in the NBA.

== Professional career ==
=== Atlanta Hawks (2004–2008) ===
Childress was selected with the sixth overall pick in the 2004 NBA draft by the Atlanta Hawks. During his rookie season in 2004–05, Childress emerged as one of two promising rookie talents for the Hawks, along with Josh Smith; as the season went on, the two showed improved play, minutes and production. Childress ranked third among rookies in double-doubles in the 2004–05 season, behind only Emeka Okafor and Dwight Howard. He was also voted to the NBA All-Rookie second team.

Over the next three seasons, Childress played a sixth man role for the Hawks, and in four total seasons for the franchise, he averaged 11.1 points and 5.6 rebounds in 285 games with 67 starts.

=== Olympiacos (2008–2010) ===
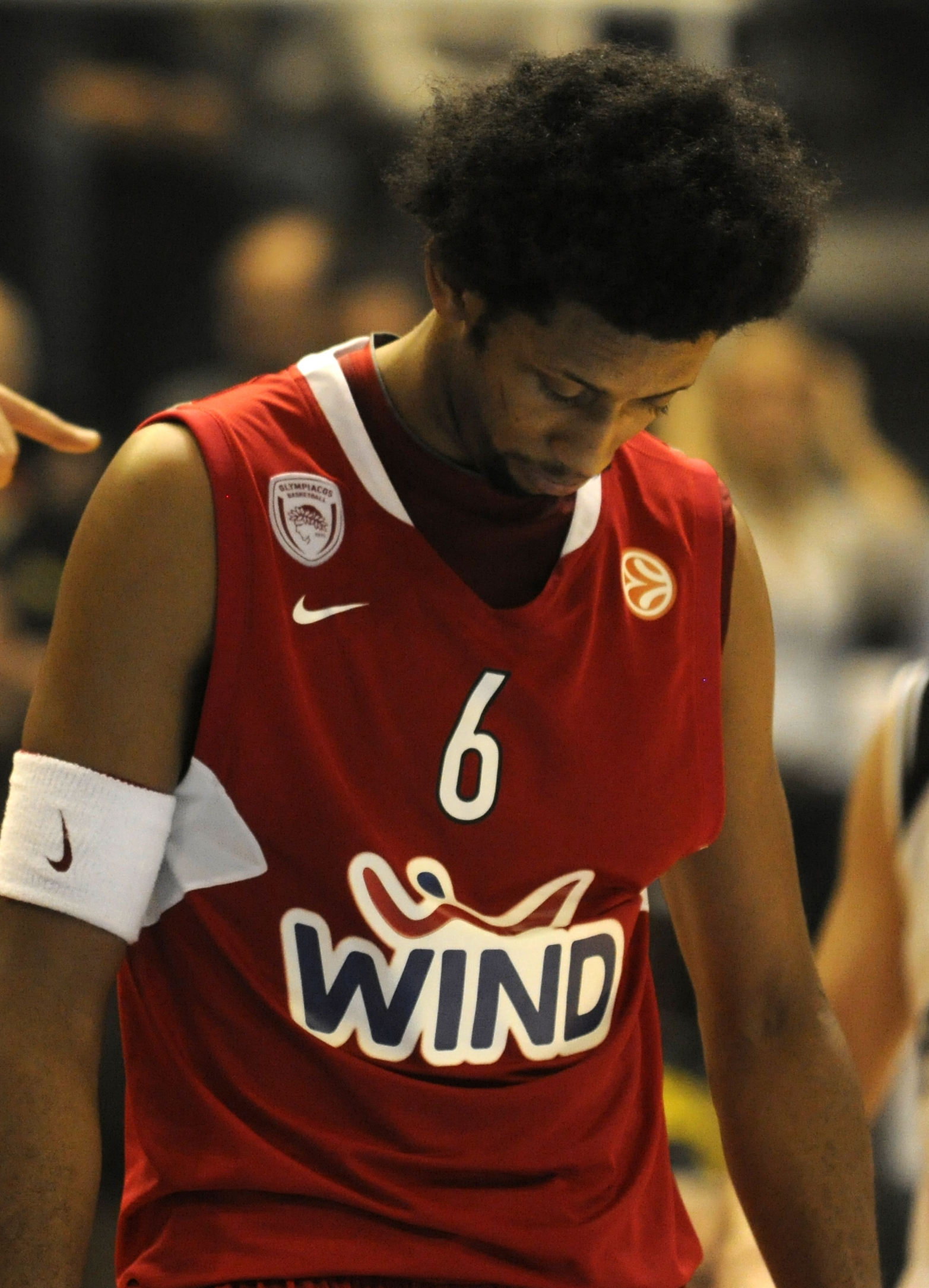
Childress in November 2009

In July 2008, Childress signed a three-year, $20 million contract with the Greek team Olympiacos Piraeus. Because of tax breaks from playing overseas, however, his $20 million contract was equivalent to $32.5 million with an NBA team. Childress also had the option to opt out of the contract after each year. Childress also received a Greek Nike shoe contract after signing with Olympiacos, a Nike sponsorship club. He had been offered a five-year, $33 million deal by the Atlanta Hawks, but he turned it down because it was significantly less money than what Olympiacos offered him.

During the 2008–09 EuroLeague season, he averaged 8.8 points, 4.6 rebounds, 1.1 assists and 1.1 steals per game. During the 2009–10 EuroLeague season, he averaged 15.2 points, 4.8 rebounds, 1.9 assists and 1.2 steals per game.

In June 2010, Childress parted ways with Olympiacos.

=== Phoenix Suns (2010–2012) ===
On July 13, 2010, Childress' rights were acquired by the Phoenix Suns in a trade that also sent a 2012 second-round draft pick to the Atlanta Hawks. Childress then signed a five-year, $34 million deal with the Suns.

On July 15, 2012, after the Suns acquired the amnestied rights of Luis Scola, Childress was released by the Suns via the amnesty clause.

=== Brooklyn Nets (2012) ===
On September 13, 2012, Childress signed with the Brooklyn Nets. On December 29, 2012, he was waived by the Nets.

=== New Orleans Pelicans (2013) ===
On September 27, 2013, Childress signed with the Washington Wizards. However, he was later waived by the Wizards on October 24, 2013. On November 12, 2013, he signed with the New Orleans Pelicans.

Childress' final NBA game was played on December 6, 2013, in a 109-95 loss to the Oklahoma City Thunder. Childress only played for a little over 2 minutes (being subbed in at the end of the 4th quarter for Eric Gordon) and recorded only 1 rebound and 1 assist. On December 13, 2013, he was waived by the Pelicans.

=== Sydney Kings (2014–2016) ===
==== 2014–15 season ====
On August 12, 2014, Childress signed with the Sydney Kings for the 2014–15 NBL season. On October 28, he was handed a one-game suspension and a $7,500 fine for unduly rough play and bringing the game into disrepute. The charges were laid over his strike to Perth Wildcats' forward Jesse Wagstaff on October 24; Childress was ejected from the game following the incident. He went on to earn Player of the Week honors for Round 5 after scoring 18 points against the Wollongong Hawks on November 7, and 36 points against the Adelaide 36ers on November 9. On December 5, he was named the NBL Player of the Month for November. On January 28, 2015, Childress was ruled out for the rest of the season after scans revealed he required surgery for a torn pectoral muscle. In 18 games for the Kings in 2014–15, he averaged 21.1 points, 9.2 rebounds, 4.2 assists and 2.1 blocks per game.

==== 2015–16 season ====
On July 2, 2015, Childress re-signed with the Kings for the 2015–16 NBL season. After missing the first four games of the season with a foot injury, Childress returned to the court on October 23 against the Adelaide 36ers. However, in his return game, he sustained another injury, this time breaking his right hand. He played through the Kings' 91–80 loss to the 36ers with the break and still managed to score 23 points, but following the game, he was ruled out for a further four to six games with a boxer's fracture. He was subsequently replaced in the line-up by fellow former NBA player Al Harrington. On November 10, he was suspended for two games for demonstrating unsportsmanlike behaviour on the sidelines during the Kings' loss to the Adelaide 36ers three days prior. Not playing in the game due to his hand injury, Childress verbally abused the referees in the tunnel of Titanium Security Arena following the conclusion of the match, further tarnishing his reputation in the NBL. A third injury to Childress, this time a fractured left hand, was sustained on December 4 against the Cairns Taipans, just two games back after recovering from his previous injury. He was subsequently ruled out for another two to four weeks. He was reactivated once again on December 29 and played out the rest of the season. In 13 games for the last-placed Kings in 2015–16, Childress averaged 21.0 points, 7.8 rebounds, 2.8 assists, 1.2 steals and 1.7 blocks per game.

=== Texas Legends (2016) ===
On March 8, 2016, Childress was acquired by the Texas Legends of the NBA Development League. Three days later, he made his debut for the Legends in a 115–113 loss to the Rio Grande Valley Vipers, recording 17 points, seven rebounds and three blocks in 29 minutes off the bench. In eight games for the Legends, he averaged 12.0 points, 6.5 rebounds, 1.6 assists and 1.0 steals per game.

=== San-en NeoPhoenix (2016–2017) ===
In November 2016, Childress signed with San-en NeoPhoenix of the Japanese B.League. In 40 games, he averaged 18.9 points, 9.5 rebounds, 1.8 assists and 1.2 blocks per game.

=== Adelaide 36ers (2017–2018) ===
After spending preseason with the Denver Nuggets, Childress signed with the Adelaide 36ers for the rest of the 2017–18 NBL season on October 21, 2017, returning to the NBL for a second stint. He helped the 36ers reach the 2018 NBL Grand Final series, where in Game 2, he suffered a shoulder injury that ruled him out for the rest of the series. The 36ers went on to lose the grand final series 3–2. In 27 games, he averaged 12.5 points, 6.6 rebounds, 2.1 assists and 1.1 steals per game.

=== Return to the NeoPhoenix (2018–2019) ===
On December 13, 2018, Childress was reported to have signed with San-en NeoPhoenix of the Japanese B.League.

== Career statistics ==
Legend
GP	Games played	GS	Games started	MPG	Minutes per game
FG%	Field-goal percentage	3P%	3-point field-goal percentage	FT%	Free-throw percentage
RPG	Rebounds per game	APG	Assists per game	SPG	Steals per game
BPG	Blocks per game	PPG	Points per game	PIR	Performance index rating
**Bold**	Career high

=== College ===
Year	Team	GP	GS	MPG	FG%	3P%	FT%	RPG	APG	SPG	BPG	PPG
2001–02	Stanford	30	6	21.5	.402	.275	.694	4.8	.8	.6	.4	7.8
2002–03	Stanford	**33**	**33**	**34.2**	.427	.333	.719	**8.1**	2.1	**1.2**	1.4	14.1
2003–04	Stanford	23	18	29.8	**.488**	**.395**	**.821**	7.5	**2.7**	.9	**1.6**	**15.7**
Career		86	57	28.6	.438	.335	.755	6.8	1.8	.9	1.1	12.3

=== NBA ===
==== Regular season ====
Year	Team	GP	GS	MPG	FG%	3P%	FT%	RPG	APG	SPG	BPG	PPG
2004–05	Atlanta	**80**	**44**	29.7	.470	.232	**.823**	6.0	1.9	.9	.4	10.1
2005–06	Atlanta	74	10	30.4	.552	**.492**	.766	5.2	1.8	**1.2**	.5	10.0
2006–07	Atlanta	55	13	**36.8**	.504	.338	.795	**6.2**	**2.3**	1.0	**.7**	**13.0**
2007–08	Atlanta	76	0	29.9	**.571**	.367	.807	4.9	1.5	.9	.6	11.8
2010–11	Phoenix	54	3	16.6	.565	.063	.492	2.9	.8	.6	.4	5.0
2011–12	Phoenix	34	0	14.4	.485	.167	.000	2.8	1.0	.4	.2	2.9
2012–13	Brooklyn	14	0	7.1	.286	.333	.500	1.1	.4	.1	.1	1.0
2013–14	New Orleans	4	0	6.0	.000	.000	.000	.8	.5	.3	.0	.0
Career		391	70	26.7	.522	.329	.779	4.7	1.6	.9	.5	9.1

==== Playoffs ====
Year	Team	GP	GS	MPG	FG%	3P%	FT%	RPG	APG	SPG	BPG	PPG
2008	Atlanta	7	0	29.3	.524	.000	.500	5.7	1.6	.1	.7	7.1
Career		7	0	29.3	.524	.000	.500	5.7	1.6	.1	.7	7.1

=== EuroLeague stats ===
Year	Team	GP	GS	MPG	FG%	3P%	FT%	RPG	APG	SPG	BPG	PPG	PIR
2008–09	Olympiacos	16	15	24.3	.470	.158	.636	4.6	1.1	**1.1**	.5	8.8	10.4
2009–10	Olympiacos	**20**	**20**	**32.3**	**.523**	**.328**	**.647**	**4.8**	**1.9**	**1.1**	**.6**	**15.2**	**15.3**
Career		36	35	28.7	.504	.286	.643	4.7	1.5	1.1	.6	12.4	13.1

=== Domestic leagues stats ===
Year	Team	League	GP	MPG	FG%	3P%	FT%	RPG	APG	SPG	BPG	PPG
2008–09	(Greece) Olympiacos	HEBA A1	9	2.7	.333	.000	.000	.2	.2	.1	.0	.4
2014–15	(Australia) Sydney Kings	NBL	18	35.6	.511	.255	.700	8.2	4.2	.8	2.1	21.1
2015–16	(Australia) Sydney Kings	NBL	13	33.9	.520	.462	.664	7.8	2.8	1.2	1.7	21.0
2016–17	(Japan) San-en NeoPhoenix	B.League	40	25.9	.518	.333	.695	9.5	1.8	.6	1.2	18.9
2017–18	(Australia) Adelaide 36ers	NBL	27	26.4	.543	.286	.758	6.5	2.2	1.1	.7	12.5
2018–19	(Japan) San-en NeoPhoenix	B.League	32	33.5	.505	.266	.801	10.5	4.0	1.5	.9	19.8

== International career ==
In 2000, Childress earned a silver medal as a member of the 2000 USA Basketball Men's Youth Development Festival West Team. He also played at the 2003 Pan American Games.

== Personal ==
Childress is featured on the box cover of ESPN College Hoops 2K5 for the PlayStation 2, published by Sega. Childress had a high school GPA of 3.5 and scored 1110 on the SAT. After being waived by the Nets, Childress enrolled back in Stanford and graduated with a degree in sociology in August 2013.
