= Marvin Williams =

American basketball player (born 1986)

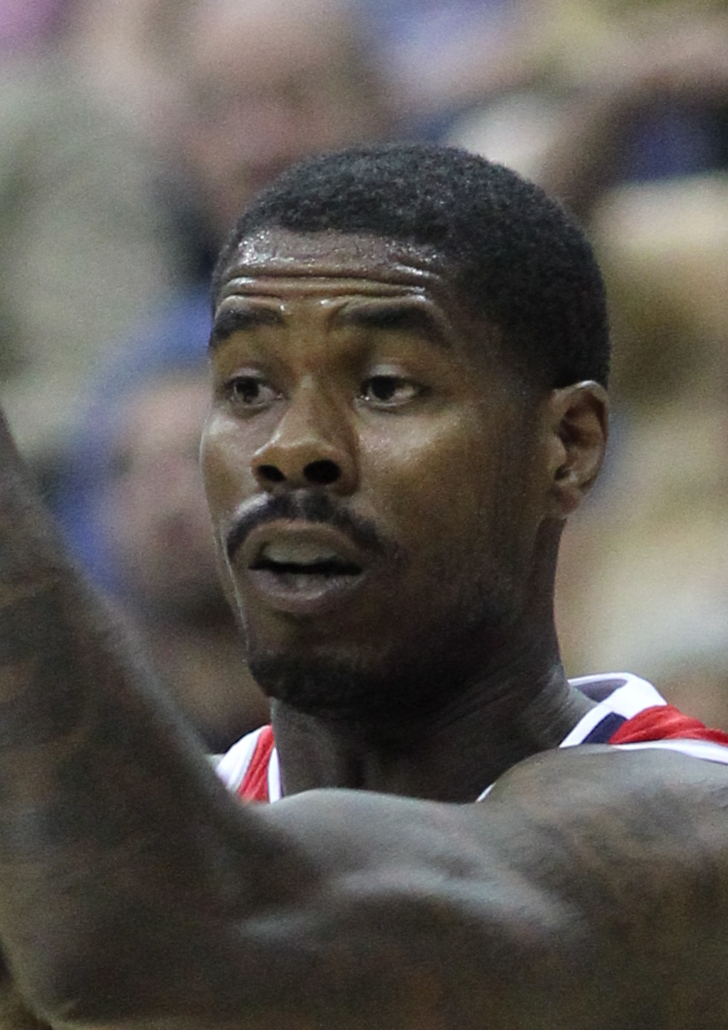
- Williams with the Atlanta Hawks in 2012

Personal information
- Born: June 19, 1986 (age 40) Bremerton, Washington, U.S.
- Listed height: 6 ft 8 in (2.03 m)
- Listed weight: 237 lb (108 kg)

Career information
- High school: Bremerton (Bremerton, Washington)
- College: North Carolina (2004–2005)
- NBA draft: 2005: 1st round, 2nd overall pick
- Drafted by: Atlanta Hawks
- Playing career: 2005–2020
- Position: Power forward / small forward
- Number: 24, 2, 20

Career history
- 2005–2012: Atlanta Hawks
- 2012–2014: Utah Jazz
- 2014–2020: Charlotte Hornets
- 2020: Milwaukee Bucks

Career highlights
- NBA All-Rookie Second Team (2006); NCAA champion (2005); USBWA National Freshman of the Year (2005); ACC Rookie of the Year (2005); ACC All-Freshman Team (2005); First-team Parade All-American (2004); McDonald's All-American (2004)

Career NBA statistics
- Points: 10,965 (10.2 ppg)
- Rebounds: 5,546 (5.2 rpg)
- Assists: 1,373 (1.3 apg)
- Stats at NBA.com
- Stats at Basketball Reference

Marvin Gaye Williams Jr. (born June 19, 1986) is an American former professional basketball player. He played one season of college basketball for North Carolina before being drafted second overall by the Atlanta Hawks in the 2005 NBA draft.

== High school career ==
Born and raised in Bremerton, Washington, Williams attended Bremerton High School, where he was a two-time all-state selection and the Washington Player of the Year by the Associated Press. As a junior in 2002–03, he averaged 23.9 points and 14 rebounds and was named area player of the year. As a senior in 2003–04, he averaged 28.7 points, 15.5 rebounds, 5.1 blocked shots and 5.2 assists. He was subsequently named a McDonald's All-American and earned first-team Parade All-American honors.

== College career ==
Williams played a lone season at North Carolina in 2004–05, helping the Tar Heels win the NCAA championship. His tip-in with 1:26 remaining in the NCAA final against Illinois broke a 70–70 tie, propelling UNC to a 75–70 victory. He earned ACC Rookie of the Year honors and was a unanimous selection to the ACC All-Freshman Team. He also earned All-ACC Honorable Mention. In 36 games all off the bench, he averaged 11.3 points, 6.6 rebounds and 1.1 steals in 22.2 minutes per game.

In April 2005, Williams declared for the NBA draft, forgoing his final three years of college eligibility.

== Professional career ==
=== Atlanta Hawks (2005–2012) ===
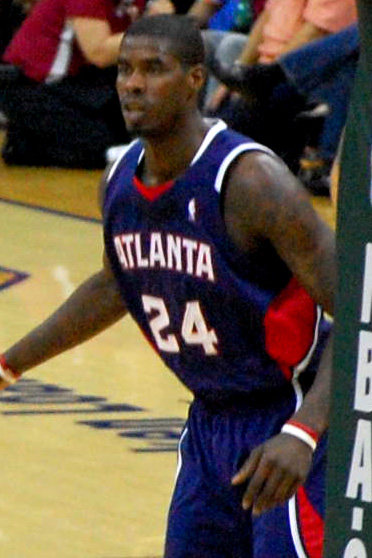
Williams in April 2010

Williams was selected by the Atlanta Hawks with the second overall pick in the 2005 NBA draft, going on to earn NBA All-Rookie Second Team honors after averaging 8.5 points and 4.8 rebounds in 79 games during the 2005–06 season. On December 20, 2005, he scored a season-high 26 points against the Miami Heat.

Williams missed the first 17 games of the 2006–07 season due to a broken bone in his left hand. On January 5, 2007, he scored a season-high 24 points against the Toronto Raptors. He tied that mark on April 13, scoring 24 points against the Washington Wizards.

The 2007–08 season saw Williams average a career-high 14.8 points per game. On January 25, 2008, he scored a career-high 33 points in a 99–90 win over the Seattle SuperSonics.

On February 25, 2009, Williams scored a season-high 31 points against the Denver Nuggets. Between early March and early April of the 2008–09 season, Williams missed 16 games with a lower back injury. Williams knocked down 55 three-pointers on the season after making just 25 in his first three seasons combined.

On August 7, 2009, Williams re-signed with the Hawks to a five-year, $37.5 million contract. On November 20, 2009, he scored a season-high 29 points against the Houston Rockets. On December 5, 2009, he had a career-high 15 rebounds against the Dallas Mavericks.

In early November of the 2010–11 season, Williams missed four games with a right knee injury. Between late December and late January, Williams missed 11 games with a bruised back. On March 27, 2011, he scored a season-high 31 points against the Cleveland Cavaliers.

In the lockout-shortened 2011–12 season, Williams played in 57 of the Hawks' 66 regular-season games. He missed three games in early January with a sprained left ankle, and five games in mid-March with a hip flexor. On April 22, 2012, he scored a season-high 29 points against the New York Knicks.

Williams helped the Hawks advance to the playoffs in five straight seasons between 2008 and 2012, appearing in 42 playoff games (27 starts), after the franchise had failed to make the postseason the previous eight years. He was a two-time recipient (2008 and 2011) of the Hawks' Jason Collier Memorial Trophy for his work as a community ambassador.

=== Utah Jazz (2012–2014) ===
On July 11, 2012, Williams was traded to the Utah Jazz in exchange for Devin Harris. He made his debut for the Jazz in their season opener on October 31, 2012, scoring 21 points in a 113–94 win over the Dallas Mavericks. He failed to surpass that scoring mark during the season, recording one other 20-point game on November 23 against the Sacramento Kings.

Williams missed the first five games and last four games of the 2013–14 season. In February 2014, he twice scored a season-high 23 points.

=== Charlotte Hornets (2014–2020) ===
On July 21, 2014, Williams signed a two-year, $14 million contract with the Charlotte Hornets. He made his debut for the Hornets in their season opener on October 29, 2014, scoring 19 points 108–106 win over the Milwaukee Bucks. He failed to surpass that scoring mark during the season.

On February 5, 2016, Williams scored a season-high 27 points in a 98–95 loss to the Miami Heat. Williams totaled 521 rebounds and 152 three-point field goals, making him one of only five players to tally at least 500 rebounds and 150 three-pointers in 2015–16 – along with Kevin Durant, Paul George, James Harden and Kevin Love – and the first player in Charlotte NBA history to do so. His 152 three-point field goals marked the third-best single-season total ever by a Charlotte forward, trailing only Glen Rice's 1996–97 and 1995–96 seasons.

On July 10, 2016, Williams re-signed with the Hornets to a four-year, $54.5 million contract. On March 10, 2017, he grabbed a career-high 18 rebounds in a 121–81 win over the Orlando Magic. On March 11, he scored a season-high 27 points in a 125–122 overtime loss to the New Orleans Pelicans. On March 13, he tied a career high with 18 rebounds in a 115–109 loss to the Chicago Bulls.

On January 15, 2018, Williams scored a season-high 21 points against the Detroit Pistons.

On December 21, 2018, Williams made a career-high seven 3-pointers and scored a then season-high 24 points in a 98–86 win over the Pistons. On January 23, 2019, against the Memphis Grizzlies, Williams passed Rex Chapman for 12th on the franchise's scoring list. On March 8, he made seven 3-pointers and scored a season-high 30 points in a 112–111 win over the Washington Wizards.

On June 11, 2019, Williams exercised his $15 million player option for the 2019–20 season.

On February 8, 2020, the Hornets reached a contract buyout agreement with Williams.

=== Milwaukee Bucks (2020) ===
On February 10, 2020, Williams signed with the Milwaukee Bucks. On August 29, Williams scored 12 points and grabbed 8 rebounds while coming off the bench for the Bucks in a deciding Game 5 win to end a round one matchup versus the Orlando Magic, in the NBA Bubble. On September 8, following the Bucks' second-round playoff exit after an upset loss against the Miami Heat, Williams announced his retirement from professional basketball.

== Career statistics ==
Legend
GP	Games played	GS	Games started	MPG	Minutes per game
FG%	Field goal percentage	3P%	3-point field goal percentage	FT%	Free throw percentage
RPG	Rebounds per game	APG	Assists per game	SPG	Steals per game
BPG	Blocks per game	PPG	Points per game	**Bold**	Career high

=== NBA ===
==== Regular season ====
Year	Team	GP	GS	MPG	FG%	3P%	FT%	RPG	APG	SPG	BPG	PPG
2005–06	Atlanta	79	7	24.7	.443	.245	.747	4.8	.8	.6	.3	8.5
2006–07	Atlanta	64	63	34.0	.433	.244	.815	5.3	**1.9**	.8	.5	13.1
2007–08	Atlanta	80	80	**34.6**	**.462**	.100	.822	5.7	1.7	**1.0**	.4	**14.8**
2008–09	Atlanta	61	59	34.3	.458	.355	.806	6.3	1.3	.9	.6	13.9
2009–10	Atlanta	**81**	**81**	30.4	.455	.303	.819	5.1	1.1	.8	.6	10.1
2010–11	Atlanta	65	52	28.7	.458	.336	.845	4.8	1.4	.5	.4	10.4
2011–12	Atlanta	57	37	26.3	.432	.389	.788	5.2	1.2	.8	.3	10.2
2012–13	Utah	73	51	23.7	.423	.325	.778	3.6	1.1	.5	.5	7.2
2013–14	Utah	66	50	25.4	.439	.359	.781	5.1	1.2	.8	.5	9.1
2014–15	Charlotte	78	37	26.1	.424	.358	.713	4.9	1.3	.9	.5	7.4
2015–16	Charlotte	**81**	**81**	28.9	.452	.402	.833	6.4	1.4	.7	**1.0**	11.7
2016–17	Charlotte	76	76	30.2	.422	.350	**.873**	**6.6**	1.4	.8	.7	11.2
2017–18	Charlotte	78	78	25.7	.458	**.413**	.829	4.7	1.2	.7	.5	9.5
2018–19	Charlotte	75	75	28.4	.422	.366	.767	5.4	1.2	.9	.8	10.1
2019–20	Charlotte	41	1	19.7	.448	.376	.860	2.7	1.0	.6	.5	6.7
2019–20	Milwaukee	17	0	18.9	.439	.308	.857	4.4	1.1	.6	.5	4.0
Career		1,072	828	28.2	.443	.362	.808	5.2	1.3	.8	.5	10.2

==== Playoffs ====
Year	Team	GP	GS	MPG	FG%	3P%	FT%	RPG	APG	SPG	BPG	PPG
2008	Atlanta	7	7	28.4	**.414**	.000	.889	4.0	.7	.3	.4	**11.4**
2009	Atlanta	6	3	16.2	.345	.167	.692	1.5	**1.0**	.8	.3	5.0
2010	Atlanta	11	**11**	31.4	.392	**.500**	.906	5.7	.7	.6	.5	8.4
2011	Atlanta	**12**	3	18.0	.393	.273	.769	2.3	.5	.8	**.6**	4.8
2012	Atlanta	6	3	24.2	.356	**.500**	.778	5.5	.8	.5	.3	7.8
2016	Charlotte	7	7	**32.6**	.275	.353	.500	**6.9**	.9	**.9**	.4	5.1
2020	Milwaukee	10	0	17.9	.447	.435	**1.000**	4.8	.9	.5	.3	5.5
Career		59	34	23.9	.378	.387	.836	4.3	.8	.6	.4	6.7

=== College ===
Year	Team	GP	GS	MPG	FG%	3P%	FT%	RPG	APG	SPG	BPG	PPG
2004–05	North Carolina	36	0	22.2	.506	.432	.847	6.6	.7	1.1	.5	11.3

== Personal life ==
Williams is the son of Marvin Williams Sr. and Andrea Gittens. He has two brothers, Demetrius and J’Tonn. Williams, whose middle name is Gaye, said about his middle name: "I was named after my dad. My grandma named my dad after Marvin Gaye."

In July 2014, Williams completed his degree in African-American studies at North Carolina. For nine years, he attended summer school and some classes during the NBA season, studying both after practice and on the road.
