= Josh Powell =

American basketball player (born 1983)

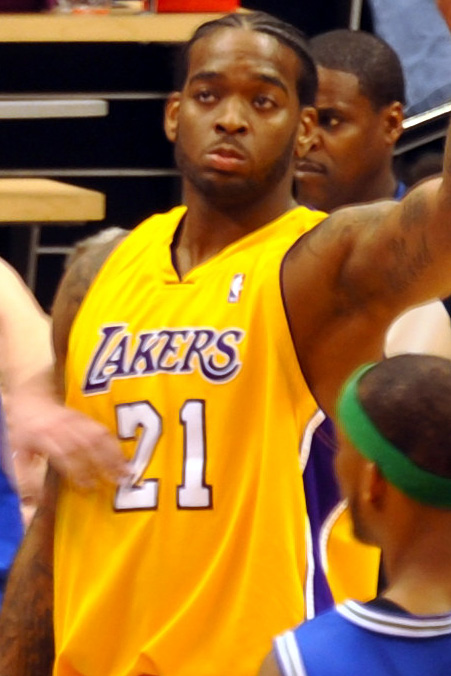
- Powell with the Los Angeles Lakers in 2010

Personal information
- Born: January 25, 1983 (age 43) Charleston, South Carolina, U.S.
- Listed height: 6 ft 9 in (2.06 m)
- Listed weight: 240 lb (109 kg)

Career information
- High school: Riverdale (Riverdale, Georgia)
- College: NC State (2001–2003)
- NBA draft: 2003: undrafted
- Playing career: 2003–2019
- Position: Power forward / center
- Number: 33, 21, 22, 12
- Coaching career: 2014–2015

Career history

Playing
- 2003: Lokomotiv-Rostov
- 2003–2004: Scafati Basket
- 2004: Southern Crescent Lightning
- 2004–2005: JuveCaserta Basket
- 2005: Southern Crescent Lightning
- 2005–2006: Dallas Mavericks
- 2006: →Fort Worth Flyers
- 2006–2007: Indiana Pacers
- 2007: Golden State Warriors
- 2007–2008: Los Angeles Clippers
- 2008–2010: Los Angeles Lakers
- 2010–2011: Atlanta Hawks
- 2011–2012: Liaoning Flying Leopards
- 2012: Union Neuchâtel Basket
- 2012: Brujos de Guayama
- 2012–2013: Olympiacos
- 2013–2014: Guangdong Southern Tigers
- 2014: Barangay Ginebra
- 2014: Houston Rockets
- 2015–2016: San Lorenzo de Almagro
- 2016: Indios de Mayagüez
- 2016: Luoyang Zhonghe
- 2016–2017: Sydney Kings
- 2017: Trotamundos de Carabobo
- 2017: Changwon LG Sakers
- 2018: Santeros de Aguada
- 2019: Atenas

Coaching
- 2014–2015: Houston Rockets (assistant)

Career highlights
- 2× NBA champion (2009, 2010); FIBA Intercontinental Cup champion (2013); EuroLeague champion (2013); WBA champion (2004); All-WBA Second Team (2004); ACC All-Rookie Team (2002)
- Stats at NBA.com
- Stats at Basketball Reference

Joshua Dominique Powell (born January 25, 1983) is an American former professional basketball player and coach. Powell won two NBA championships with the Los Angeles Lakers in 2009 and 2010, and has also spent time with the Dallas Mavericks, Indiana Pacers, Atlanta Hawks, Los Angeles Clippers, Golden State Warriors and Houston Rockets. In 2013, Powell was a member of the Olympiacos side that won the EuroLeague championship. He has also played in Russia, Italy, Argentina, Puerto Rico, China, the Philippines, Australia and Venezuela.

== College career ==
Powell spent two years at North Carolina State, where in his freshman campaign, he averaged 7.2 points and 3.9 rebounds per game en route to earning a spot on the ACC All-Rookie squad. He went on to average 12.4 points and 5.3 rebounds in 31 games his sophomore season, and was named the team's most improved player as the recipient of the Tom Gugliotta Award. He ranked seventh in the ACC in blocks (1.3), 20th in scoring and 18th in rebounding. He was named to the All-ACC Tournament first team after putting up 20.0 points, 7.0 rebounds and 3.0 blocks in three contests, including a career-best 26-point effort in the championship game against Duke.

== Professional career ==
=== Early years ===
After going undrafted in the 2003 NBA draft, Powell spent the preseason with the Dallas Mavericks, before moving to Russia for his first professional season. He managed just two games for Lokomotiv-Rostov before joining Italian team Scafati Basket for the rest of the 2003–04 season. Following his stint in Italy, he returned to the United States and played for the Southern Crescent Lightning, helping them win the 2004 WBA championship. He also spent the 2004–05 season in Italy with JuveCaserta Basket before re-joining the Southern Crescent Lightning in 2005.

=== Dallas Mavericks ===
Powell re-signed with the Dallas Mavericks in August 2005, but managed just 16 games over the first half of the 2005–06 season. On February 27, 2006, he was assigned to the Fort Worth Flyers of the NBA Development League. He was recalled by the Mavericks on March 4, and went on to play in 21 games throughout March and April. On April 4, 2006, he scored a season-high 12 points in a 127–101 win over the Sacramento Kings. He finished the regular season with an 11-point, nine-rebound effort against the Los Angeles Clippers on April 19. The Mavericks reached the NBA Finals in 2006, where they were defeated 4–2 by the Miami Heat. Powell appeared in six games over the Mavericks' playoff run.

=== Indiana Pacers and Golden State Warriors ===
In July 2006, Powell was traded, along with Darrell Armstrong and Rawle Marshall, to the Indiana Pacers in exchange for Anthony Johnson. He appeared in just seven games for the Pacers in 2006–07 before being traded to the Golden State Warriors in an eight-player deal on January 17, 2007. On January 27, 2007, in just his second game for the Warriors, Powell scored a then career-high 13 points in a 131–105 win over the Charlotte Bobcats. He played in 30 regular season games for the Warriors, as well as making four playoff appearances.

=== Los Angeles Clippers ===
On August 14, 2007, Powell signed with the Los Angeles Clippers. On April 3, 2008, he recorded a career-high 13 rebounds in a 110–98 loss to the Sacramento Kings. Three days later, he scored a career-high 22 points in a 105–79 loss to the Houston Rockets. On July 30, 2008, he was waived by the Clippers.

=== Los Angeles Lakers ===
Powell celebrating the Los Angeles Lakers' 2009 championship

On August 14, 2008, Powell signed with the Los Angeles Lakers. Over two seasons with the Lakers, he won two NBA championships.

=== Atlanta Hawks ===
On July 26, 2010, Powell signed a one-year, $1.1 million contract with the Atlanta Hawks.

=== China, Switzerland and Puerto Rico ===
In September 2011, Powell signed with the Liaoning Flying Leopards for the 2011–12 CBA season. Following the CBA season, he joined Union Neuchâtel Basket for their Swiss Cup semi-final game.

On March 29, 2012, Powell signed with Puerto Rican team Brujos de Guayama. Exactly one month later, he was replaced in the line-up by Marcus Fizer.

=== San Antonio Spurs ===
On September 27, 2012, Powell signed with the San Antonio Spurs for training camp. He was later waived by the Spurs on October 26, 2012, after appearing in six preseason games.

=== Olympiacos ===
On November 2, 2012, Powell signed with Greek team Olympiacos. He went on to help the team win the 2012–13 EuroLeague championship.

=== New York Knicks ===
On September 30, 2013, Powell signed with the New York Knicks for training camp. He was later waived by the Knicks on October 25, 2013, after appearing in five preseason games.

=== China and the Philippines ===
On October 30, 2013, Powell signed with the Guangdong Southern Tigers for the 2013–14 CBA season.

On April 1, 2014, Powell joined the Barangay Ginebra San Miguel of the Philippine Basketball Association, one day before making his Commissioner's Cup debut. He parted ways with Ginebra on April 13, 2014, after receiving an NBA call-up.

=== Houston Rockets and Milwaukee Bucks ===
On April 16, 2014, Powell signed with the Houston Rockets. On October 24, 2014, he was waived by the Rockets. After being waived by the Rockets, Powell joined Kevin McHale's staff as a player development coach for the 2014–15 season.

On September 18, 2015, Powell signed with the Milwaukee Bucks for training camp. He was later waived by the Bucks on October 21, 2015, after appearing in four preseason games.

=== Argentina, Puerto Rico and China ===
On December 3, 2015, Powell signed with San Lorenzo de Almagro of the Liga Nacional de Básquet. In March 2016, he parted ways with San Lorenzo and signed with Puerto Rican team Indios de Mayagüez.

On May 23, 2016, Powell signed with Luoyang Zhonghe of the Chinese NBL.

=== Sydney Kings ===
On October 7, 2016, Powell signed with the Sydney Kings for the 2016–17 NBL season. Six days later, he made his debut for the Kings in their second game of the season. In 22½ minutes off the bench, he recorded 14 points and six rebounds in an 88–84 win over the Illawarra Hawks. On October 20, he scored 17 points on 8-of-11 shooting off the bench in a 92–78 win over the New Zealand Breakers. On December 23, he scored a season-high 21 points in an 87–75 loss to Illawarra, dropping the Kings to 10–10 on the season with a fourth-straight defeat. The Kings went on to finish the season in seventh place, missing the playoffs with a 13–15 record. In 27 games for the Kings, Powell averaged 9.4 points, 4.8 rebounds and 1.0 assists per game.

=== Venezuela and Korea ===
On March 13, 2017, Powell signed with Trotamundos de Carabobo of the Liga Profesional de Baloncesto. In October 2017, he joined Changwon LG Sakers of the Korean Basketball League. He left the team in November 2017 after appearing in nine games.

== Career statistics ==
Legend
GP	Games played	GS	Games started	MPG	Minutes per game
FG%	Field-goal percentage	3P%	3-point field-goal percentage	FT%	Free-throw percentage
RPG	Rebounds per game	APG	Assists per game	SPG	Steals per game
BPG	Blocks per game	PPG	Points per game	PIR	Performance index rating
**Bold**	Career high

=== NBA ===
†	Denotes seasons in which Powell won the NBA

==== Regular season ====
Year	Team	GP	GS	MPG	FG%	3P%	FT%	RPG	APG	SPG	BPG	PPG
2005–06	Dallas	37	2	11.6	.457	.000	**.800**	2.2	.2	**.2**	.1	3.0
2006–07	Indiana	7	0	9.1	.133	.000	.667	2.7	.4	.0	.0	1.7
2006–07	Golden State	30	0	9.6	**.526**	.000	.733	2.3	.6	**.2**	.4	3.5
2007–08	L.A. Clippers	**64**	**25**	**19.2**	.460	.000	.724	**5.2**	**.7**	**.2**	.4	**5.5**
2008–09†	L.A. Lakers	60	1	11.7	.444	.000	.760	2.9	.5	**.2**	.3	4.2
2009–10†	L.A. Lakers	63	0	9.2	.366	**.438**	.645	1.8	.6	.1	.1	2.7
2010–11	Atlanta	54	0	12.1	.452	.000	**.800**	2.5	.4	.1	.1	4.1
2013–14	Houston	1	0	19.0	.333	.000	.000	5.0	.0	.0	**1.0**	4.0
Career		316	28	12.6	.438	.350	.743	2.9	.5	.2	.2	3.9

==== Playoffs ====
Year	Team	GP	GS	MPG	FG%	3P%	FT%	RPG	APG	SPG	BPG	PPG
2006	Dallas	6	0	4.2	.000	.000	.000	.3	.2	.0	.0	.0
2007	Golden State	4	0	1.5	.000	.000	.500	.3	.0	.0	**.3**	.3
2009†	L.A. Lakers	**14**	0	5.2	.423	**1.000**	**1.000**	**1.2**	**.3**	.0	.1	**2.1**
2010†	L.A. Lakers	13	0	3.1	.375	.000	.750	.5	.1	.0	.0	.7
2011	Atlanta	9	0	**5.3**	**.556**	.000	.000	1.0	.1	.0	.0	1.1
Career		46	0	4.2	.404	.500	.833	.8	.2	.0	.0	1.1

=== EuroLeague ===
†	Denotes seasons in which Powell won the EuroLeague

Year	Team	GP	GS	MPG	FG%	3P%	FT%	RPG	APG	SPG	BPG	PPG	PIR
2012–13†	Olympiacos	25	19	12.8	.550	.500	.727	2.7	.2	.0	.4	5.1	3.9
Career		25	19	12.8	.550	.500	.727	2.7	.2	.0	.4	5.1	3.9

=== College ===
Year	Team	GP	GS	MPG	FG%	3P%	FT%	RPG	APG	SPG	BPG	PPG
2001–02	NC State	**34**	–	19.5	.528	.143	.712	3.9	.9	.4	.9	7.2
2002–03	NC State	31	–	**27.0**	**.571**	**.375**	**.739**	**5.3**	**1.0**	**.6**	**1.3**	**12.4**
Career		65	–	23.1	.553	.289	.729	4.5	1.0	.5	1.1	9.7

== Personal life ==
Powell's cousin, Khris Middleton, plays in the NBA for the Washington Wizards.
