= Josh Smith =

American basketball player (born 1985)

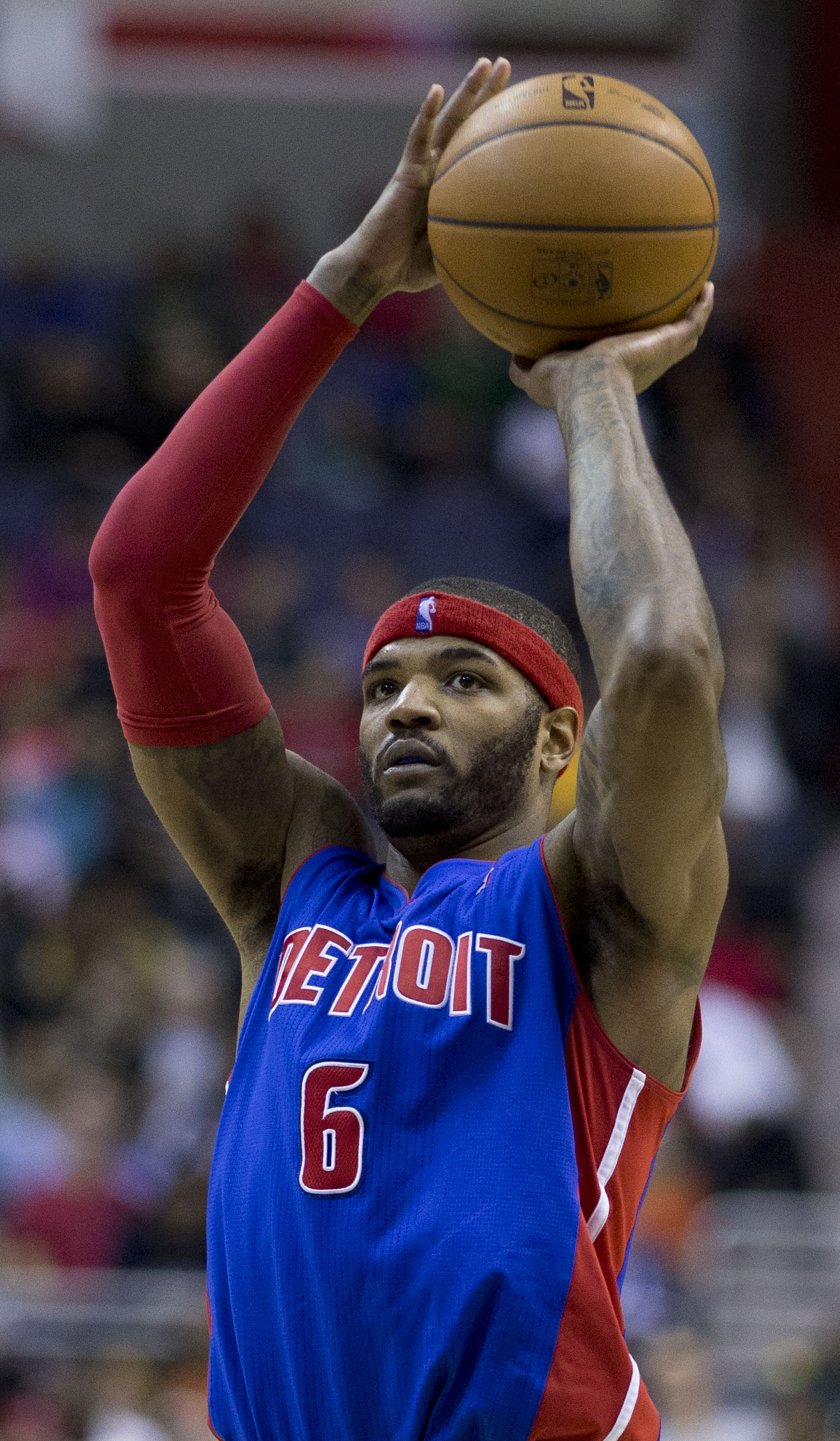
- Smith with the Detroit Pistons in 2014

Personal information
- Born: December 5, 1985 (age 40) College Park, Georgia, U.S.
- Listed height: 6 ft 9 in (2.06 m)
- Listed weight: 225 lb (102 kg)

Career information
- High school: McEachern (Powder Springs, Georgia); Oak Hill Academy (Mouth of Wilson, Virginia)
- NBA draft: 2004: 1st round, 17th overall pick
- Drafted by: Atlanta Hawks
- Playing career: 2004–2017
- Position: Power forward / small forward
- Number: 5, 6

Career history
- 2004–2013: Atlanta Hawks
- 2013–2014: Detroit Pistons
- 2014–2015: Houston Rockets
- 2015–2016: Los Angeles Clippers
- 2016: Houston Rockets
- 2016–2017: Sichuan Blue Whales
- 2017: New Orleans Pelicans

Career highlights
- NBA All-Defensive Second Team (2010); NBA All-Rookie Second Team (2005); NBA Slam Dunk Contest champion (2005); First-team Parade All-American (2004); McDonald's All-American (2004)

Career NBA statistics
- Points: 12,996 (14.5 ppg)
- Rebounds: 6,653 (7.4 rpg)
- Blocks: 1,713 (1.9 bpg)
- Stats at NBA.com
- Stats at Basketball Reference

Joshua Smith (born December 5, 1985) is an American former professional basketball player who played 13 seasons in the National Basketball Association (NBA). Entering the NBA straight out of high school, Smith played nine seasons with the Atlanta Hawks, then played for the Detroit Pistons, Houston Rockets and Los Angeles Clippers between 2013 and 2016. His final stint in the NBA came in November 2017 with the New Orleans Pelicans. He is sometimes referred to by his nickname "J-Smoove".

== High school career ==
Smith attended John McEachern High in Powder Springs, Georgia. During the summer before his senior year, he played alongside future NBA players Randolph Morris and Dwight Howard on the Atlanta Celtics AAU team. Smith transferred to Oak Hill Academy for his senior year where he was teammates with Rajon Rondo. He averaged 22 points, 8 rebounds, 4 assists, 6 blocks, and 3 steals per game on the season, helping lead Oak Hill to 38–0 record. Smith was highly recruited as Rivals.com rated him the third best overall player in the nation and the number one small forward. Smith committed to play for Indiana University but he decided to forgo college and enter the NBA draft.

== Professional career ==
=== Atlanta Hawks (2004–2013) ===
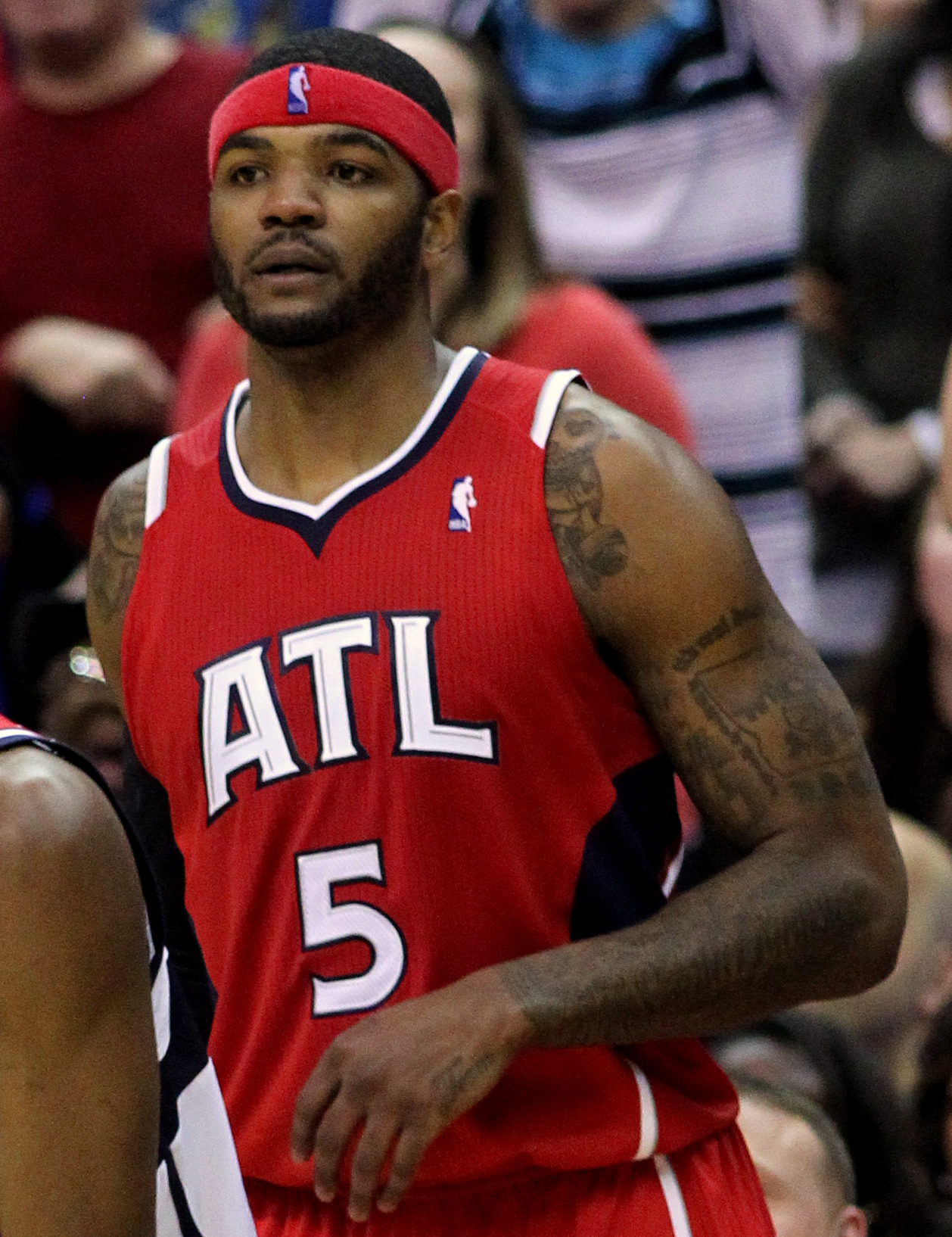
Smith with the Hawks in March 2012

Smith was selected by the Atlanta Hawks with the 17th overall pick in the 2004 NBA draft. He won the NBA Slam Dunk Contest his rookie year during the 2005 NBA All-Star Weekend. He became only the fifth player to record three perfect scores in the same contest along with Jason Richardson, Vince Carter, Spud Webb, and Michael Jordan. Smith averaged 9.7 points, 6.2 rebounds and 1.95 blocks per game for the 2004–05 season and was selected to the NBA All-Rookie Second Team.

On March 3, 2007, Smith broke the 500 career block mark, making him the youngest player to do so in NBA history. He ended the 2006–07 season with averages of 16.4 points, 8.6 rebounds, 3.3 assists, 1.4 steals and 2.9 blocks per game. On November 17, 2007, Smith scored a career-high 38 points on the road against the Milwaukee Bucks.

On April 28, 2008, in Game 4 of their first round series, Smith set playoff career highs of 28 points and 7 blocks in a 97–92 upset victory over the top-seeded Boston Celtics. Despite being the 8-seed, the Hawks would ultimately push the Celtics to seven games before losing the series, and the Celtics would go on to win the 2008 NBA Finals. That offseason, on August 8, 2008, Smith signed a five-year, $58 million offer sheet with the Memphis Grizzlies, but the Hawks quickly matched.

On February 2, 2010, in a 99–106 loss to the Oklahoma City Thunder, Smith became the youngest player (at 24 years old) to record 1,000 career blocked shots. At season's end, he was named to the NBA All-Defensive Second Team for the first time in his career.

On March 31, 2012, Smith scored 34 points and grabbed 9 rebounds in a 95–90 loss to the Chicago Bulls. That postseason, on April 29, Smith led the Hawks to a Game 1 win over the Boston Celtics with 22 points and 18 rebounds. However, the Hawks lost the following three games, eventually losing the series 4–2.

=== Detroit Pistons (2013–2014) ===
On July 10, 2013, Smith signed with the Detroit Pistons on a reported four-year, $54 million deal.

On December 13, 2013, Smith scored 31 points and grabbed 7 rebounds in an 111–109 overtime loss to the Portland Trail Blazers. On February 22, 2014, Smith recorded a first half career high of 24 points as he went on to finish with a season high of 32 in a 102–113 loss to the Dallas Mavericks. He finished his first season in Detroit with averages of 16.4 points, 6.8 rebounds, 3.3 assists, 1.4 steals, and 1.4 blocks per game

On October 29, 2014, during Detroit's season opener, Smith scored what would be a season high 25 points and grabbed 5 rebounds in a 89–79 loss to the Denver Nuggets. On December 22, 2014, Smith was waived by the Pistons. In 28 games during the 2014–15 season, Smith averaged 13.1 points, 7.2 rebounds and 4.7 assists per game, while shooting 39.1% from the field, 24.3% from three-point range and 46.8% from the free throw line. In 105 career games with the Pistons, Smith averaged 15.5 points, 6.9 rebounds and 3.7 assists per game.

=== Houston Rockets (2014–2015) ===
On December 26, 2014, Smith signed with the Houston Rockets and went on to make his debut that night. In just under 32 minutes of action off the bench, he recorded 21 points, 8 rebounds and 3 assists in the Rockets' 117–111 overtime win over the Memphis Grizzlies. Following that game, Smith was moved into the starting lineup but struggled as the Rockets won only one of their next four games. After a blowout loss to the New Orleans Pelicans, Smith was moved back to the bench in order to help him get more comfortable with the team.

During the 2015 NBA Playoffs, Smith had multiple impressive games. In Game 2 of the first round against the Dallas Mavericks, Smith tied his playoff career-high of 9 assists, 6 of which were alley-oops to childhood friend and former AAU teammate Dwight Howard, as he helped lead the Rockets to victory. He later scored 23 and 20 points in Games 4 and 5, respectively, as the Rockets won the series in five games. In Game 6 of the conference semi-finals against the Los Angeles Clippers, he scored 19 points, 14 coming in the fourth quarter, as he led a comeback from 19 points down in an elimination game on the road to force, and eventually win, a decisive Game 7. During the playoffs, Smith made a career-high 38% of his three-point attempts.

=== Los Angeles Clippers (2015–2016) ===
On July 16, 2015, Smith signed a one-year deal with the Los Angeles Clippers. He made his debut for the Clippers in the team's season opener against the Sacramento Kings on October 28, recording 1 point, 6 rebounds and 4 blocks off the bench in a 111–104 win.

=== Second stint with Houston (2016) ===
On January 22, 2016, Smith was traded back to the Houston Rockets, along with the draft rights to Serhiy Lishchuk and cash considerations, in exchange for the draft rights to Maarty Leunen. He made his return game for the Rockets later that night, recording 2 points (on 1-of-10 shooting), 5 rebounds, 6 assists, 2 steals and 3 blocks in a 102–98 win over the Milwaukee Bucks. Two days later, in his second game back for the Rockets, Smith scored a then season-high 16 points in a 115–104 win over the Dallas Mavericks. He topped that mark on February 2, scoring 19 points as a starter in a 115–102 win over the Miami Heat.

=== Sichuan Blue Whales (2016–2017) ===
On November 8, 2016, Smith signed a three-month, $1.5+ million contract with the Sichuan Blue Whales of the Chinese Basketball Association. In his second game for Sichuan on November 16, 2016, Smith recorded 41 points, 19 rebounds, five blocks in a loss to Guangdong Southern Tigers. In the game, he shot 7-of-18 from three-point range. He left the team in late January 2017, and in 26 games, he averaged 18.8 points, 10.6 rebounds, 3.2 assists and 2.0 blocks in 29.5 minutes per game while making only one start.

=== New Orleans Pelicans (2017) ===
On September 28, 2017, Smith joined the Israeli team Maccabi Haifa for their preseason U.S. tour, with the aim being to play in the NBA again.

On October 28, 2017, Smith signed with the New Orleans Pelicans to help the team deal with numerous injuries. New Orleans had to use the NBA hardship exemption to sign him as he made their roster stand at 16, one over the allowed limited of 15. He appeared in three games for the Pelicans before being waived on November 10, 2017.

== Big3 ==
In March 2019, Smith signed to play in the Big3 3-on-3 basketball league.

== NBA career statistics ==
Legend
GP	Games played	GS	Games started	MPG	Minutes per game
FG%	Field goal percentage	3P%	3-point field goal percentage	FT%	Free throw percentage
RPG	Rebounds per game	APG	Assists per game	SPG	Steals per game
BPG	Blocks per game	PPG	Points per game	**Bold**	Career high
*	Led the league

=== Regular season ===
Year	Team	GP	GS	MPG	FG%	3P%	FT%	RPG	APG	SPG	BPG	PPG
2004–05	Atlanta	74	59	27.7	.455	.174	.688	6.2	1.7	.8	1.9	9.7
2005–06	Atlanta	80	73	32.0	.425	.309	.719	6.6	2.4	.8	2.6	11.3
2006–07	Atlanta	72	72	**36.8**	.439	.250	.693	8.6	3.3	1.4	**2.9**	16.4
2007–08	Atlanta	81	**81**	35.5	.457	.253	.710	8.2	3.4	1.5	2.8	17.2
2008–09	Atlanta	69	69	35.1	.492	.299	.588	7.2	2.4	1.4	1.6	15.6
2009–10	Atlanta	81	**81**	35.4	**.505**	.000	.618	8.7	4.2	**1.6**	2.1	15.7
2010–11	Atlanta	77	77	34.4	.477	**.331**	**.725**	8.5	3.3	1.3	1.6	16.5
2011–12	Atlanta	66*	66*	35.3	.458	.257	.630	**9.6**	3.9	1.4	1.7	**18.8**
2012–13	Atlanta	76	76	35.3	.465	.303	.517	8.4	4.2	1.2	1.8	17.5
2013–14	Detroit	77	76	35.5	.419	.264	.532	6.8	3.3	1.4	1.4	16.4
2014–15	Detroit	**28***	28	32.0	.391	.243	.468	7.2	**4.7**	1.3	1.7	13.1
2014–15	Houston	**55***	7	25.5	.438	.330	.521	6.0	2.6	.9	1.2	12.0
2015–16	L.A. Clippers	32	1	14.3	.383	.310	.595	3.9	1.3	.6	1.1	5.7
2015–16	Houston	23	6	18.3	.343	.271	.480	2.9	2.1	.7	.6	6.6
2017–18	New Orleans	3	0	4.0	.250	.000	.000	1.3	.0	.0	.0	.7
Career		894	772	32.4	.452	.285	.632	7.4	3.1	1.2	1.9	14.5

=== Playoffs ===
Year	Team	GP	GS	MPG	FG%	3P%	FT%	RPG	APG	SPG	BPG	PPG
2008	Atlanta	7	7	33.9	.398	.167	**.841**	6.4	2.9	1.7	**2.9**	15.7
2009	Atlanta	11	11	37.3	.421	.133	.732	7.5	2.2	1.1	1.5	**17.1**
2010	Atlanta	11	11	35.6	**.481**	.333	.659	9.0	2.6	1.2	1.7	14.1
2011	Atlanta	12	**12**	36.5	.404	.125	.597	8.5	2.9	1.1	2.1	15.1
2012	Atlanta	5	5	**39.2**	.386	.000	.762	**13.6**	**4.8**	.6	1.0	16.8
2013	Atlanta	6	6	33.2	.433	.250	.528	7.5	3.5	**1.8**	.5	17.0
2015	Houston	**17**	8	23.3	.438	.380	.432	5.6	2.7	.5	1.0	13.5
2016	Houston	4	0	9.5	.462	**.500**	.000	.5	1.0	.3	.3	4.0
Career		73	60	31.6	.426	.277	.627	7.4	2.8	1.0	1.5	14.6

== NBA records ==
Youngest player in NBA history to record:

- 10 blocked shots in a game, Atlanta Hawks at Dallas Mavericks, December 18, 2004 (19 years, 13 days)
- 500 career blocked shots, Atlanta Hawks vs. New York Knicks, March 3, 2007 (21 years, 88 days) (206 games)
- 1,000 career blocked shots, Atlanta Hawks at Oklahoma City Thunder, February 2, 2010 (24 years, 59 days) (423 games)

== Personal life ==
Smith is one of five children born to Pete and Paulette Smith. His father was a professional basketball player during the 1970s and played in the American Basketball Association (ABA). His mother ran in the 2022 Republican primary for Georgia's 6th congressional district. He married Alexandria Lopez on July 31, 2010. The couple have three children (two sons and one daughter).

== See also ==
- List of National Basketball Association career blocks leaders
- List of National Basketball Association single-game blocks leaders
