= Michael Redd =

American basketball player (born 1979)

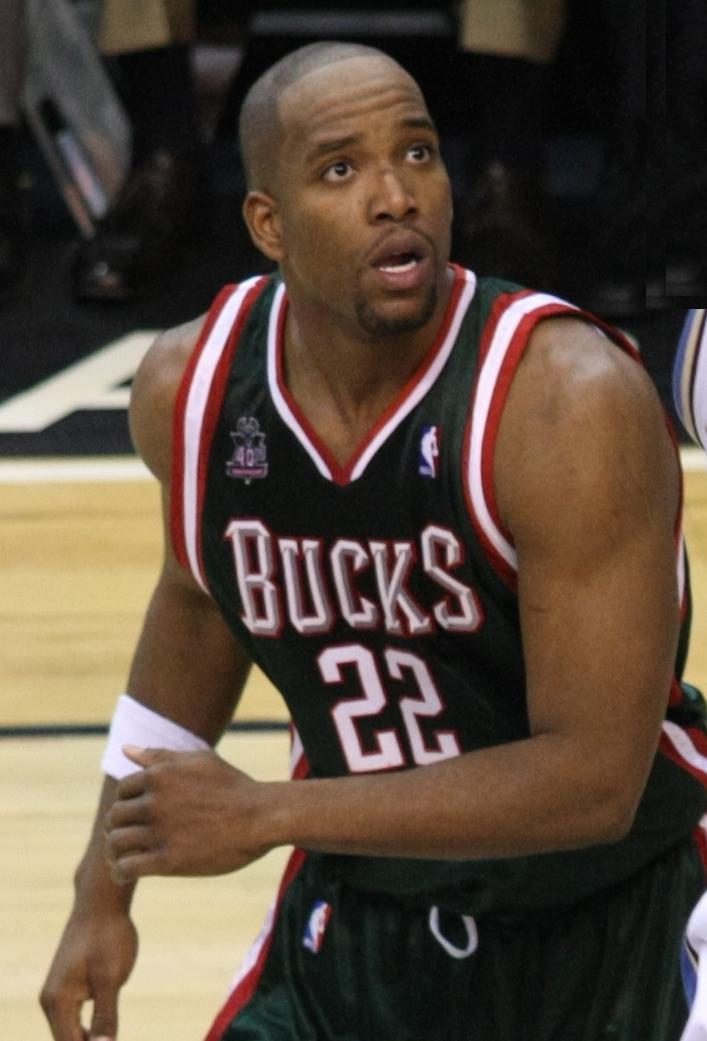
- Redd with the Milwaukee Bucks in 2008

Personal information
- Born: August 24, 1979 (age 47) Columbus, Ohio, U.S.
- Listed height: 6 ft 6 in (1.98 m)
- Listed weight: 215 lb (98 kg)

Career information
- High school: West (Columbus, Ohio)
- College: Ohio State (1997–2000)
- NBA draft: 2000: 2nd round, 43rd overall pick
- Drafted by: Milwaukee Bucks
- Playing career: 2000–2012
- Position: Shooting guard / small forward
- Number: 22

Career history
- 2000–2011: Milwaukee Bucks
- 2011–2012: Phoenix Suns

Career highlights
- NBA All-Star (2004); All-NBA Third Team (2004); First-team All-Big Ten (2000); Big Ten Freshman of the Year (1998)

Career NBA statistics
- Points: 11,972 (19.0 ppg)
- Rebounds: 2,411 (3.8 rpg)
- Assists: 1,338 (2.1 apg)
- Stats at NBA.com
- Stats at Basketball Reference
Medals
Men's basketball
Representing United States
Olympic Games
Gold medal – first place	2008 Beijing	Team competition
FIBA Americas Championship
Gold medal – first place	2007 Las Vegas	Team competition
Summer Universiade
Gold medal – first place	1999 Palma	Team competition

Michael Wesley Redd (born August 24, 1979) is an American former professional basketball player. Standing 6 feet 6 inches (1.98 m) tall and weighing 215 pounds (98 kg), he played 12 seasons in the National Basketball Association (NBA), primarily with the Milwaukee Bucks. Born in Columbus, Ohio, Redd attended West High School and later Ohio State University. As an Ohio State student, he was selected 43rd overall in the 2000 NBA draft. Redd spent both his collegiate and professional career at the shooting guard and small forward positions. He was also a member of the U.S. national basketball team and was an All-Star in 2004.

== Early life and education ==
Redd was born on August 24, 1979, in Columbus, Ohio. In his college years, Redd spent three years leading the offensive attack of The Ohio State University garnering point averages of 21.9, 19.5, and 17.5, respectively. As a sophomore, Redd and Scoonie Penn led Ohio State to the NCAA Final Four. He was then drafted after his junior year in the 2000 NBA draft as a second round pick (43rd overall) by the Milwaukee Bucks.

== Professional career ==
=== Milwaukee Bucks (2000–2011) ===
In his rookie year, Redd was not able to contribute immediately as he was behind NBA All-Star guard Ray Allen on the depth chart. Later on, however, it became apparent that he was better than anticipated as proven by accounts that he had played extremely well against Ray Allen, Glenn Robinson, and other teammates in practice. It was then that former Bucks' head coach George Karl rewarded him with additional playing time. He posted averages of 11.4 points per contest as well as 44.4% on three-point shooting during his second NBA season. On February 20, 2002, against the Houston Rockets, Redd made eight three-point field goals in the fourth quarter, a then-NBA record. In October 2002, he signed a four-year, $12 million offer sheet with the Dallas Mavericks, but it was matched by the Bucks and he remained in Milwaukee. During the 2003–04 season, Redd's performance, amongst other reasons (ouster of Ray Allen to Seattle via a trade), was rewarded with full starter's duties and later earning averages of 21.7 points per contest en route to his first and only All-Star Game appearance.

After the 2004–05 season, Redd signed a new contract with the Bucks that lasted six years and was worth $91 million. He chose to stay with the Bucks over leaving for his home state team, the Cleveland Cavaliers, and a chance to play for less money with LeBron James.

In the 2006–07 season, Redd arguably had the best season of his career, averaging a career-high 26.7 points per game. That season, on November 11, 2006, Redd scored a career-high 57 points in a 113–111 loss to the Utah Jazz, breaking the single-game Bucks record for points scored set by Kareem Abdul-Jabbar in 1971. Later that season, on March 4, 2007, Redd scored 52 points in an overtime loss to the Chicago Bulls. Despite his efforts, the Bucks struggled to win games, finishing 28–54 in the season.

The Milwaukee Bucks were dealt a devastating blow January 25, 2009, when they learned Redd would miss the rest of the season with a torn ACL and MCL in his left knee. Redd missed the rest of the 2008–09 season.

Redd returned for the Bucks to start the 2009–10 season, but during a game against the Los Angeles Lakers on January 10, 2010, he re-tore his ACL and MCL in the same knee that he had injured almost a year earlier. It was announced the next day that he would once again be lost for the rest of the season.

On March 28, 2011, Redd was able to return to the Bucks after 14 months from the injury and recorded four assists in his return. On March 30, 2011, against the Toronto Raptors, Redd scored his first NBA basket since his return from injury. Redd played 10 games in the 2010–11 season. When he left Milwaukee, he had averaged 20 points per game in his 11 seasons with the team.

=== Phoenix Suns (2011–2012) ===
The Phoenix Suns signed Redd to a one-year contract on December 29, 2011. Redd made his debut for Phoenix on January 12, 2012, scoring 14 points in a loss to the Cavaliers. Redd returned to Milwaukee on February 7, 2012, scoring 14 points in the win over the Bucks. He received a standing ovation from the crowd. On March 18, 2012, Redd scored a season-high 25 points in a victory against the Houston Rockets. In his final NBA game on April 25, 2012, he scored 14 points in a 110–106 loss to the San Antonio Spurs.

=== Retirement ===
On November 6, 2013, Redd announced his retirement from the NBA. In his retirement Redd has become an accomplished entrepreneur and venture capitalist. He also has a popular podcast called Betting On Yourself.

In 2021, Redd was one of only three former Bucks players (Brandon Jennings and Marques Johnson) to appear in Milwaukee's championship parade.

== National team career ==
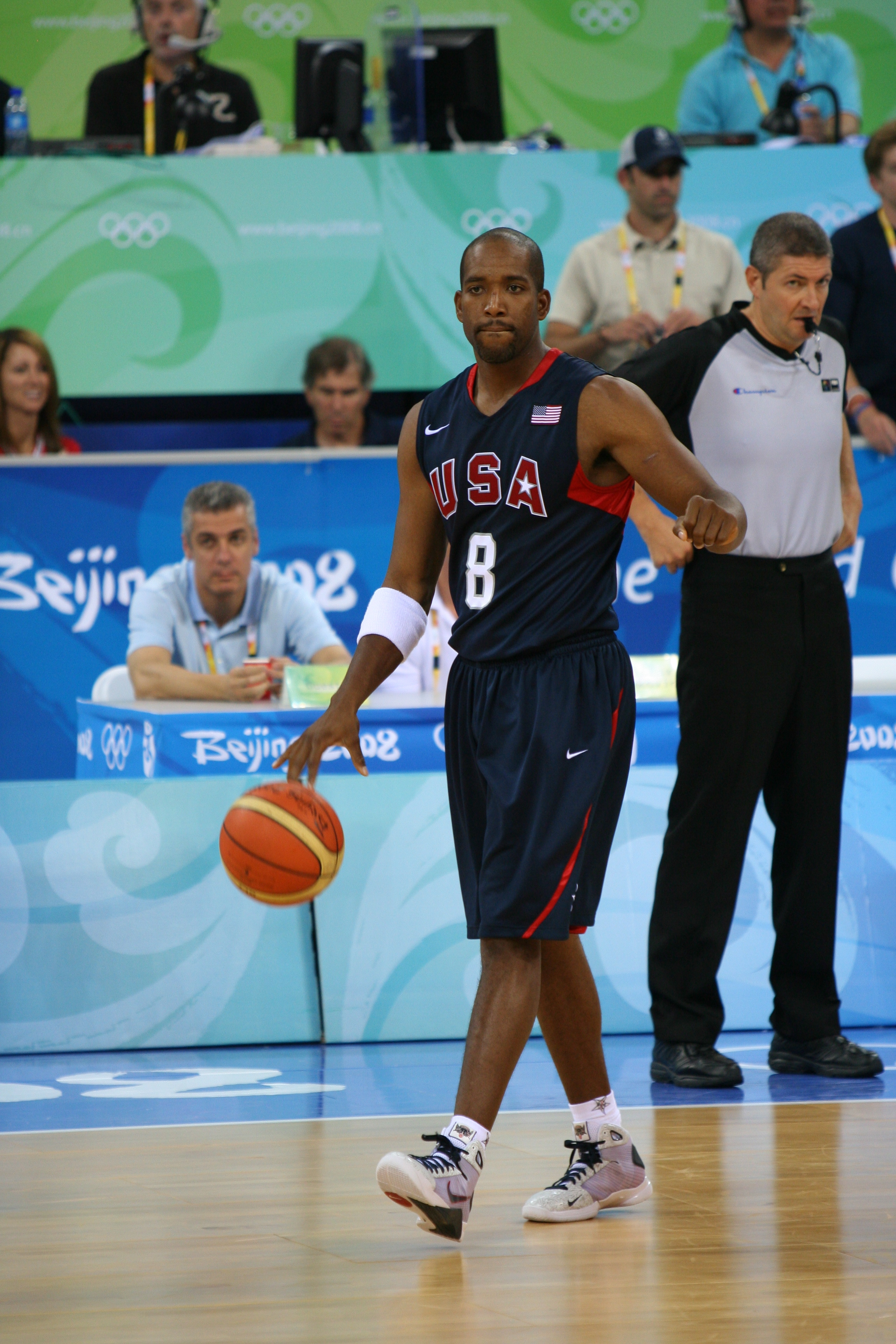
Redd with the United States national team at the 2008 Olympics

Redd frequently played for Team USA at the junior level and played in the 2007 FIBA Americas tournament, a qualifying tournament for the 2008 Summer Olympics. He averaged over 15 points throughout the competition. During the team's game against Puerto Rico, Redd set the qualifying record for most 3-pointers made in one game. He also set the record of most three-pointers made in the whole tournament (28) surpassing Penny Hardaway who had the previous record of 22. Redd participated in the 2008 Olympics as the team went unbeaten on the way to winning back the gold medal after defeating 2006 FIBA World Championship winners Spain and living up to their "Redeem Team" moniker after missing out on gold in the 2004 Summer Olympics.

== Personal life ==
Redd, a devout Christian, bought a church building for his father's ministry as the first purchase after signing his contract worth $91 million over six years. The church was newly named Philadelphia Deliverance Church of Christ built in his hometown of Columbus.

Redd, via NCT Ventures, invested in Azoti, an Ohio startup that connects producers and buyers of food.

Redd lives in New Albany, Ohio.

Redd has a son born on June 10, 2007 named Michael Redd II who pursued a career in the aviation industry rather than basketball.

== In pop culture ==
Rapper Nelly name-dropped Redd along with fellow NBA players Magic Johnson, Kareem Abdul-Jabbar, Shaquille O'Neal, and Allen Iverson—as well as NFL players Julius Peppers, Ray Lewis, and Peyton Manning—in the song "Heart of a Champion," the first track on 2004 album Sweat. Early in the song's second verse, Nelly says: "... I get Buck like Michael Redd--tell 'em again: I gets Buck like Michael Redd. Heard what I said?"

== Accomplishments ==
- All-NBA Third Team: 2004
- NBA All-Star: 2004
- Held NBA record for most three-point field goals made in one quarter with 8 in the fourth quarter (February 20, 2002 vs. Houston Rockets); since broken by Klay Thompson on January 23, 2015.
- 5th on Milwaukee Bucks all-time points list, 5th in Milwaukee Bucks all-time scoring avg.
- Won the 1998, 1999, and 2000 Ohio State Most Valuable Player awards.
- Was 1999–00 All-Big Ten First Team in college.
- Scored a playoff career-high of 40 points against the Detroit Pistons on April 29, 2006.
- Named to the USA Olympic basketball team.
- Gold medal with Team USA, 2007 FIBA Americas Championship
- Gold medal with Team USA, 2008 Summer Olympic Games (team-inducted into the Naismith Hall of Fame, class of 2025)
- Scored a career-high and Milwaukee Bucks then-franchise record 57 points against the Utah Jazz on November 11, 2006. The record was later broken by Giannis Antetokounmpo, who scored 64 points against the Indiana Pacers on December 13, 2023.

== NBA career statistics ==
Legend
GP	Games played	GS	Games started	MPG	Minutes per game
FG%	Field goal percentage	3P%	3-point field goal percentage	FT%	Free throw percentage
RPG	Rebounds per game	APG	Assists per game	SPG	Steals per game
BPG	Blocks per game	PPG	Points per game	**Bold**	Career high

=== Regular season ===
Year	Team	GP	GS	MPG	FG%	3P%	FT%	RPG	APG	SPG	BPG	PPG
2000–01	Milwaukee	6	0	5.8	.263	.000	.500	.7	.2	.2	.0	2.2
2001–02	Milwaukee	67	8	21.1	**.483**	**.444**	.791	3.3	1.4	.6	.1	11.4
2002–03	Milwaukee	**82**	14	28.2	.469	.438	.805	4.5	1.4	**1.2**	**.2**	15.1
2003–04	Milwaukee	**82**	**82**	36.8	.440	.350	.868	**5.0**	2.3	1.0	.1	21.7
2004–05	Milwaukee	75	75	38.0	.441	.355	.854	4.2	2.3	.8	.1	23.0
2005–06	Milwaukee	80	80	**39.1**	.450	.395	.877	4.3	2.9	**1.2**	.1	25.4
2006–07	Milwaukee	53	53	38.4	.465	.382	.829	3.7	2.3	**1.2**	**.2**	**26.7**
2007–08	Milwaukee	72	71	37.5	.442	.362	.820	4.3	**3.4**	.9	**.2**	22.7
2008–09	Milwaukee	33	32	36.5	.455	.366	.814	3.2	2.7	1.1	.1	21.2
2009–10	Milwaukee	18	12	27.3	.352	.300	.712	3.0	2.2	1.1	.1	11.9
2010–11	Milwaukee	10	0	13.4	.400	.235	**1.000**	.8	1.2	.2	.1	4.4
2011–12	Phoenix	51	2	15.1	.400	.318	.793	1.5	.6	.3	.0	8.2
Career		629	429	32.0	.447	.380	.838	3.8	2.1	.9	.1	19.0
All-Star		1	0	15.0	.417	.500	.000	3.0	2.0	3.0	.0	13.0

=== Playoffs ===
Year	Team	GP	GS	MPG	FG%	3P%	FT%	RPG	APG	SPG	BPG	PPG
2003	Milwaukee	**6**	0	21.3	.404	.250	**.929**	3.5	1.8	.3	**.2**	9.7
2004	Milwaukee	5	**5**	**38.4**	.410	.300	.762	5.0	**2.6**	.0	.0	18.0
2006	Milwaukee	5	**5**	37.0	**.524**	**.467**	.891	**5.4**	1.6	**.8**	.0	**27.2**
Career		16	10	31.6	.452	.340	.864	4.6	2.0	.4	.1	17.8
