= 2007–08 Milwaukee Bucks season =

NBA professional basketball team season

- Head coach: Larry Krystkowiak
- General manager: Larry Harris, John Hammond
- Owners: Herb Kohl
- Arena: Bradley Center

Results
- Record: 26–56 (.317)
- Place: Division: 5th (Central); Conference: 13th (Eastern)
- Playoff finish: Did not qualify
- Stats at Basketball Reference

Local media
- Television: FSN Wisconsin
- Radio: WTMJ

The 2007–08 Milwaukee Bucks season was the 40th season of NBA basketball in Milwaukee, Wisconsin. It began in October. The Bucks finished with just 26 wins in the weak Eastern Conference and as a result Larry Krystkowiak was fired after just one season as coach, one day after the season officially ended. Scott Skiles was then appointed coach soon after to a four-year contract.

Key dates prior to the start of the season:

- The 2007 NBA draft took place in New York City on June 28.
- The free agency period begins in July.

== Draft picks ==
Milwaukee's selections from the 2007 NBA draft in New York City.

| Round | Pick | Player | Position | Nationality | School/Club team |
|---|---|---|---|---|---|
| 1 | 6 | Yi Jianlian | Power forward | China | Guangdong Southern Tigers |
| 2 | 56 | Ramon Sessions | Point guard | United States | Nevada |

== Roster ==
2007–08 Milwaukee Bucks roster
Players

| Pos. | No. | Player | Height | Weight | DOB | From |
|---|---|---|---|---|---|---|
| PG | 42 | Charlie Bell | 6 ft 3 in (1.91 m) | 200 lb (91 kg) | 1979–03–12 | Michigan State |
| C | 6 | Andrew Bogut | 7 ft 0 in (2.13 m) | 260 lb (118 kg) | 1984–11–28 | Utah |
| C | 50 | Dan Gadzuric | 6 ft 11 in (2.11 m) | 245 lb (111 kg) | 1978–02–02 | UCLA |
| G | 12 | Royal Ivey | 6 ft 4 in (1.93 m) | 215 lb (98 kg) | 1981–12–20 | Texas |
| SF | 24 | Desmond Mason | 6 ft 5 in (1.96 m) | 222 lb (101 kg) | 1977–10–11 | Oklahoma State |
| SG | 22 | Michael Redd | 6 ft 6 in (1.98 m) | 215 lb (98 kg) | 1979–08–24 | Ohio State |
| F/C | 51 | Michael Ruffin | 6 ft 8 in (2.03 m) | 248 lb (112 kg) | 1977–01–21 | Tulsa |
| PG | 7 | Ramon Sessions | 6 ft 3 in (1.91 m) | 190 lb (86 kg) | 1986–04–11 | Nevada |
| G/F | 21 | Bobby Simmons | 6 ft 6 in (1.98 m) | 230 lb (104 kg) | 1980–06–02 | DePaul |
| SF | 20 | Awvee Storey | 6 ft 6 in (1.98 m) | 225 lb (102 kg) | 1977–04–18 | Arizona State |
| PF | 31 | Charlie Villanueva | 6 ft 11 in (2.11 m) | 232 lb (105 kg) | 1984–08–24 | Connecticut |
| F/C | 43 | Jake Voskuhl | 6 ft 11 in (2.11 m) | 255 lb (116 kg) | 1977–11–01 | Connecticut |
| PG | 25 | Mo Williams | 6 ft 1 in (1.85 m) | 185 lb (84 kg) | 1982–12–19 | Alabama |
| PF | 9 | Yi Jianlian (injured) | 7 ft 0 in (2.13 m) | 238 lb (108 kg) | 1987–10–27 | China |

Coaches
Head coach
- Larry Krystkowiak
Assistant(s)
- Jarinn Akana
- Tony Brown
- Brian James
- Bill Peterson
- Jim Todd

Legend
- (DP) Unsigned draft pick
- (FA) Free agent
- (S) Suspended
- Injured

== Regular season ==
=== Season standings ===
| Central Division | W | L | PCT | GB | Home | Road | Div |
|---|---|---|---|---|---|---|---|
| y-Detroit Pistons | 59 | 23 | .732 | – | 34–7 | 25–16 | 11–5 |
| x-Cleveland Cavaliers | 45 | 37 | .549 | 14 | 27–14 | 18–23 | 7–9 |
| Indiana Pacers | 36 | 46 | .439 | 23 | 21–20 | 15–26 | 5–11 |
| Chicago Bulls | 33 | 49 | .402 | 26 | 20–21 | 13–28 | 11–5 |
| Milwaukee Bucks | 26 | 56 | .317 | 33 | 19–22 | 7–34 | 6–10 |

Eastern Conference
| # | Team | W | L | PCT | GB |
|---|---|---|---|---|---|
| 1 | z-Boston Celtics | 66 | 16 | .805 | – |
| 2 | y-Detroit Pistons | 59 | 23 | .732 | 7 |
| 3 | y-Orlando Magic | 52 | 30 | .634 | 14 |
| 4 | x-Cleveland Cavaliers | 45 | 37 | .549 | 21 |
| 5 | x-Washington Wizards | 43 | 39 | .524 | 23 |
| 6 | x-Toronto Raptors | 41 | 41 | .500 | 25 |
| 7 | x-Philadelphia 76ers | 40 | 42 | .488 | 26 |
| 8 | x-Atlanta Hawks | 37 | 45 | .451 | 29 |
| 9 | Indiana Pacers | 36 | 46 | .439 | 30 |
| 10 | New Jersey Nets | 34 | 48 | .415 | 32 |
| 11 | Chicago Bulls | 33 | 49 | .402 | 33 |
| 12 | Charlotte Bobcats | 32 | 50 | .390 | 34 |
| 13 | Milwaukee Bucks | 26 | 56 | .317 | 40 |
| 14 | New York Knicks | 23 | 59 | .280 | 43 |
| 15 | Miami Heat | 15 | 67 | .183 | 51 |

== Game log ==
2007–08 game log
Total: 26–56 (Home: 19–22; Road: 7–34)
October: 0–1 (home: 0–0; road: 0–1)

| Game | Date | Team | Score | High points | High rebounds | High assists | Location Attendance | Record |
|---|---|---|---|---|---|---|---|---|
| 1 | October 31, 2007 | @ Orlando | L 83–102 | Michael Redd (25) | Andrew Bogut (11) | Andrew Bogut, Charlie Bell (4) | Amway Arena; 17,519 | 0–1 |

November: 7–7 (home: 6–1; road: 1–6)

| Game | Date | Team | Score | High points | High rebounds | High assists | Location Attendance | Record |
|---|---|---|---|---|---|---|---|---|
| 2 | November 2, 2007 | @ Charlotte | L 99–102 | Michael Redd (21) | Andrew Bogut (17) | Charlie Bell (5) | Charlotte Bobcats Arena; 16,368 | 0–2 |
| 3 | November 3, 2007 | Chicago | W 78–72 | Michael Redd (27) | Michael Redd (9) | Michael Redd (5) | Bradley Center; 18,717 | 1–2 |
| 4 | November 6, 2007 | Toronto | W 112–85 | Desmond Mason (21) | Andrew Bogut (11) | Michael Redd, Mo Williams (6) | Bradley Center; 13,549 | 2–2 |
| 5 | November 9, 2007 | @ Houston | L 88–104 | Michael Redd (26) | Mo Williams (9) | Mo Williams, Yi Jianlian (9) | Toyota Center; 18,244 | 2–3 |
| 6 | November 11, 2007 | @ San Antonio | L 88–113 | Mo Williams (17) | Yi Jianlian, Jake Voskuhl (7) | Mo Williams (6) | AT&T Center; 17,670 | 2–4 |
| 7 | November 14, 2007 | Memphis | W 102–99 | Michael Redd (31) | Yi Jianlian (12) | | Bradley Center; 13,462 | 3–4 |
| 8 | November 17, 2007 | Atlanta | W 105–96 | Andrew Bogut, Michael Redd (21) | | | Bradley Center; 14,511 | 4–4 |
| 9 | November 20, 2007 | @ Cleveland | W 111–107 | Michael Redd (34) | | | Quicken Loans Arena; 20,115 | 5–4 |
| 10 | November 21, 2007 | Los Angeles | W 110–103 | Michael Redd (26) | | | Bradley Center; 17,526 | 6–4 |
| 11 | November 24, 2007 | Dallas | W 97–95 | Michael Redd (27) | | | Bradley Center; 16,376 | 7–4 |
| 12 | November 27, 2007 | Philadelphia | L 99–114 | Michael Redd (17) | | | Bradley Center; 18,717 | 7–5 |
| 13 | November 28, 2007 | @ Atlanta | L 80–96 | Michael Redd (24) | | | Philips Arena; 11,286 | 7–6 |
| 14 | November 30, 2007 | @ New York | L 88–91 | Michael Redd (27) | | | Madison Square Garden; 18,979 | 7–7 |

December: 4–12 (home: 3–3; road: 1–9)

| Game | Date | Team | Score | High points | High rebounds | High assists | Location Attendance | Record |
|---|---|---|---|---|---|---|---|---|
| 15 | December 1, 2007 | Detroit | L 91–117 | Bobby Simmons, Charlie Villanueva (13) | | | Bradley Center; 17,326 | 7–8 |
| 16 | December 4, 2007 | @ L. A. Clippers | W 87–78 | Michael Redd (25) | | | STAPLES Center; 16,004 | 8–8 |
| 17 | December 5, 2007 | @ Golden State | L 90–120 | Michael Redd (24) | | | Oracle Arena; 17,823 | 8–9 |
| 18 | December 7, 2007 | @ Seattle | L 98–104 | Michael Redd (41) | | | KeyArena; 13,142 | 8–10 |
| 19 | December 9, 2007 | @ Portland | L 113–117 OT | Mo Williams (33) | | | Rose Garden; 18,317 | 8–11 |
| 20 | December 10, 2007 | @ Sacramento | L 93–96 | Michael Redd (24) | | | ARCO Arena; 12,449 | 8–12 |
| 21 | December 12, 2007 | Orlando | W 100–86 | Michael Redd (27) | | | Bradley Center; 14,617 | 9–12 |
| 22 | December 14, 2007 | @ Boston | L 82–104 | Mo Williams (14) | | | TD Banknorth Garden; 18,624 | 9–13 |
| 23 | December 15, 2007 | Minnesota | W 95–92 | Michael Redd (32) | Andrew Bogut (13) | | Bradley Center; 15,512 | 10–13 |
| 24 | December 17, 2007 | @ Cleveland | L 99–104 2OT | Michael Redd (22) | | | Quicken Loans Arena; 20,562 | 10–14 |
| 25 | December 19, 2007 | Sacramento | L 89–102 | Michael Redd (27) | Yi Jianlian (12) | | Bradley Center; 13,746 | 10–15 |
| 26 | December 22, 2007 | Charlotte | W 103–99 | Yi Jianlian (29) | | | Bradley Center; 15,796 | 11–15 |
| 27 | December 26, 2007 | @ Denver | L 105–125 | Mo Williams (28) | | | Pepsi Center; 18,701 | 11–16 |
| 28 | December 28, 2007 | @ Chicago | L 99–103 | Michael Redd (34) | | | United Center; 22,189 | 11–17 |
| 29 | December 29, 2007 | New Jersey | L 95–97 | Michael Redd (35) | | | Bradley Center; 15,562 | 11–18 |
| 30 | December 31, 2007 | @ Detroit | L 69–114 | Michael Redd (18) | | | The Palace of Auburn Hills; 22,076 | 11–19 |

January: 7–10 (home: 4–3; road: 3–7)

| Game | Date | Team | Score | High points | High rebounds | High assists | Location Attendance | Record |
|---|---|---|---|---|---|---|---|---|
| 31 | January 2, 2008 | @ Miami | W 103–98 | Mo Williams (25) | | | AmericanAirlines Arena; 19,600 | 12–19 |
| 32 | January 4, 2008 | Washington | L 77–101 | Charlie Villanueva (20) | | | Bradley Center; 16,250 | 12–20 |
| 33 | January 6, 2008 | @ Charlotte | W 93–89 | Charlie Bell (27) | | | Charlotte Bobcats Arena; 10,884 | 13–20 |
| 34 | January 8, 2008 | @ Philadelphia | W 87–83 | Charlie Bell, Mo Williams (21) | | | Wachovia Center; 10,045 | 14–20 |
| 35 | January 9, 2008 | Miami | W 98–92 | Mo Williams (35) | | | Bradley Center; 15,834 | 15–20 |
| 36 | January 11, 2008 | @ L. A. Lakers | L 105–110 | Mo Williams (28) | | | STAPLES Center; 18,997 | 15–21 |
| 37 | January 12, 2008 | @ Phoenix | L 114–120 | Andrew Bogut (29) | | | US Airways Center; 18,422 | 15–22 |
| 38 | January 14, 2008 | @ Utah | L 87–98 | Andrew Bogut (23) | | | EnergySolutions Arena; 19,911 | 15–23 |
| 39 | January 16, 2008 | Atlanta | W 87–80 | Andrew Bogut (21) | | | Bradley Center; 14,506 | 16–23 |
| 40 | January 19, 2008 | Golden State | L 99–119 | Michael Redd (24) | | | Bradley Center; 16,615 | 16–24 |
| 41 | January 21, 2008 | @ New Orleans | L 92–106 | Michael Redd (19) | | | New Orleans Arena; 11,663 | 16–25 |
| 42 | January 22, 2008 | Phoenix | L 105–114 | Michael Redd (28) | | | Bradley Center; 14,503 | 16–26 |
| 43 | January 24, 2008 | Indiana | W 104–92 | Michael Redd (37) | | | Bradley Center; 14,267 | 17–26 |
| 44 | January 25, 2008 | @ Toronto | L 75–106 | Michael Redd, Charlie Villanueva (12) | | | Air Canada Centre; 19,800 | 17–27 |
| 45 | January 27, 2008 | Indiana | W 105–102 OT | Mo Williams (37) | | | Bradley Center; 15,621 | 18–27 |
| 46 | January 29, 2008 | @ New Jersey | L 80–87 | Royal Ivey (19) | | | Izod Center; 14,133 | 18–28 |
| 47 | January 30, 2008 | @ Philadelphia | L 69–112 | Royal Ivey (19) | | | Wachovia Center; 12,507 | 18–29 |

February: 4–7 (home: 3–4; road: 1–3)

| Game | Date | Team | Score | High points | High rebounds | High assists | Location Attendance | Record |
|---|---|---|---|---|---|---|---|---|
| 48 | February 2, 2008 | Houston | L 83–91 | Andrew Bogut (21) | Yi Jianlian (7) | Mo Williams (9) | Bradley Center; 18,717 | 18–30 |
| 49 | February 5, 2008 | @ Memphis | W 102–97 | Mo Williams (32) | | | FedEx Forum; 10,749 | 19–30 |
| 50 | February 6, 2008 | @ Dallas | L 96–107 | Mo Williams (36) | | | American Airlines Center; 20,079 | 19–31 |
| 51 | February 9, 2008 | New York | L 98–99 | Michael Redd, Charlie Villanueva (21) | | | Bradley Center; 15,874 | 19–32 |
| 52 | February 11, 2008 | L. A. Clippers | L 89–96 | Mo Williams (31) | | | Bradley Center; 13,319 | 19–33 |
| 53 | February 13, 2008 | New Orleans | L 107–111 | Michael Redd (30) | | | Bradley Center; 14,317 | 19–34 |
| 54 | February 20, 2008 | Detroit | W 103–98 | Michael Redd (27) | | | Bradley Center; 14,211 | 20–34 |
| 55 | February 22, 2008 | @ Detroit | L 100–127 | Michael Redd, Charlie Villanueva (18) | | | The Palace of Auburn Hills; 22,076 | 20–35 |
| 56 | February 23, 2008 | Denver | W 115–109 | Michael Redd (42) | | | Bradley Center; 16,674 | 21–35 |
| 57 | February 26, 2008 | Cleveland | W 105–102 | Mo Williams (37) | | | Bradley Center; 16,674 | 22–35 |
| 58 | February 28, 2008 | @ New Jersey | L 106–120 | Michael Redd (42) | | | Izod Center; 14,034 | 22–36 |

March: 2–12 (home: 2–7; road: 0–5)

| Game | Date | Team | Score | High points | High rebounds | High assists | Location Attendance | Record |
|---|---|---|---|---|---|---|---|---|
| 59 | March 1, 2008 | San Antonio | L 94–96 | Michael Redd (25) | | | Bradley Center; 16,974 | 22–37 |
| 60 | March 2, 2008 | @ Indiana | L 106–128 | Michael Redd (42) | | | Conseco Fieldhouse; 11,614 | 22–38 |
| 61 | March 5, 2008 | Seattle | W 118–106 | Charlie Villanueva (32) | | | Bradley Center; 15,010 | 23–38 |
| 62 | March 7, 2008 | Portland | L 101–103 | Michael Redd (25) | | | Bradley Center; 15,537 | 23–39 |
| 63 | March 9, 2008 | Philadelphia | L 97–119 | Charlie Villanueva (25) | | | Bradley Center; 16,437 | 23–40 |
| 64 | March 11, 2008 | @ Washington | L 97–105 | Michael Redd (26) | | | Verizon Center; 14,755 | 23–41 |
| 65 | March 12, 2008 | Utah | L 110–114 | Michael Redd, Charlie Villanueva (26) | | | Bradley Center; 14,582 | 23–42 |
| 66 | March 15, 2008 | Boston | L 77–99 | Charlie Bell (16) | | | Bradley Center; 14,582 | 23–43 |

April: 0–0 (home: 0–0; road: 0–0)

| Game | Date | Team | Score | High points | High rebounds | High assists | Location Attendance | Record |

2007–08 schedule

=== March ===
Record: 2–12; Home: 2–7; Road: 0–5

| # | Date | Visitor | Score | Home | OT | Leading scorer | Attendance | Record |
| 67 | 18 March 2008 | Heat | 112–106 | Bucks | NA | Michael Redd (27) | -- | 23–44 |
| 68 | 22 March 2008 | Cavaliers | 98–108 | Bucks | NA | Maurice Williams (29) | -- | 24–44 |
| 69 | 24 March 2008 | Bucks | 73–78 | Heat | NA | Michael Redd (24) | -- | 24–45 |
| 70 | 26 March 2008 | Bucks | 96–115 | Hawks | NA | Andrew Bogut (27) | -- | 24–46 |
| 71 | 28 March 2008 | Magic | 103–86 | Bucks | NA | Maurice Williams (18) | -- | 24–47 |
| 72 | 29 March 2008 | Bucks | 111–114 | Bulls | NA | Michael Redd (33) | -- | 24–48 |

=== April ===
Record: 2–8; Home: 1–4; Road: 1–4

| # | Date | Visitor | Score | Home | OT | Leading scorer | Attendance | Record |
| 73 | 1 April 2008 | Knicks | 115–119 | Bucks | 1 | Michael Redd (36) | -- | 25–48 |
| 74 | 2 April 2008 | Bucks | 110–109 | Wizards | NA | Charlie Villanueva (24) | -- | 26–48 |
| 75 | 4 April 2008 | Pacers | 105–101 | Bucks | NA | Michael Redd (28) | -- | 26–49 |
| 76 | 6 April 2008 | Bucks | 97–105 | Pacers | NA | Michael Redd (24) | -- | 26–50 |
| 77 | 8 April 2008 | Celtics | 107–104 | Bucks | 1 | Michael Redd (25) | -- | 26–51 |
| 78 | 9 April 2008 | Bucks | 93–111 | Raptors | NA | Charlie Villanueva (38) | -- | 26–52 |
| 79 | 11 April 2008 | Bucks | 86–102 | Celtics | NA | Michael Redd (18) | -- | 26–53 |
| 80 | 12 April 2008 | Nets | 111–98 | Bucks | NA | Desmond Mason (18) | -- | 26–54 |
| 81 | 14 April 2008 | Bulls | 151–135 | Bucks | NA | Andrew Bogut (25) | -- | 26–55 |
| 82 | 16 April 2008 | Bucks | 101–110 | Timberwolves | 1 | Ramon Sessions (25) | -- | 26–56 |

- Green background indicates win.
- Red background indicates loss.

== Playoffs ==
The Bucks failed to qualify for the playoffs for the second consecutive season.

== Player stats ==
Legend
| GP | Games played | GS | Games started | MPG | Minutes per game |
| FG% | Field-goal percentage | 3P% | 3-point field-goal percentage | FT% | Free-throw percentage |
| RPG | Rebounds per game | APG | Assists per game | SPG | Steals per game |
| BPG | Blocks per game | PPG | Points per game |

=== Regular season ===
| Player | GP | GS | MPG | FG% | 3P% | FT% | RPG | APG | SPG | BPG | PPG |
|---|---|---|---|---|---|---|---|---|---|---|---|
| Charlie Bell | 68 | 5 | 23.9 | .381 | .341 | .805 | 2.5 | 3.1 | .76 | .03 | 7.6 |
| Andrew Bogut | 78 | 78 | 34.9 | .511 | .000 | .587 | 9.8 | 2.6 | .82 | 1.73 | 14.3 |
| Dan Gadzuric | 51 | 4 | 10.5 | .416 | .000 | .524 | 2.8 | .2 | .39 | .47 | 3.2 |
| Royal Ivey | 75 | 20 | 19.2 | .394 | .327 | .726 | 1.6 | 2.1 | .60 | .09 | 5.6 |
| Yi Jianlian | 66 | 49 | 25.0 | .421 | .286 | .841 | 5.2 | .8 | .55 | .85 | 8.6 |
| Desmond Mason | 59 | 56 | 28.8 | .482 | .000 | .659 | 4.3 | 2.1 | .68 | .51 | 9.7 |
| Michael Redd | 72 | 71 | 37.5 | .442 | .362 | .820 | 4.3 | 3.4 | .90 | .18 | 22.7 |
| Michael Ruffin | 46 | 2 | 13.7 | .532 | .000 | .397 | 4.0 | .5 | .67 | .41 | 2.0 |
| Ramon Sessions | 17 | 7 | 26.5 | .436 | .429 | .780 | 3.4 | 7.5 | 1.00 | .18 | 8.1 |
| Bobby Simmons | 70 | 21 | 21.7 | .421 | .351 | .757 | 3.2 | 1.1 | .71 | .07 | 7.6 |
| Awvee Storey | 26 | 0 | 10.0 | .438 | .000 | .483 | 2.1 | .6 | .27 | .04 | 3.5 |
| Charlie Villanueva | 76 | 31 | 24.1 | .435 | .297 | .783 | 6.1 | 1.0 | .39 | .46 | 11.7 |
| Jake Voskuhl | 44 | 0 | 8.8 | .463 | .000 | .828 | 2.2 | .3 | .20 | .48 | 2.2 |
| Maurice Williams | 66 | 66 | 36.5 | .480 | .385 | .856 | 3.5 | 6.3 | 1.18 | .15 | 17.2 |

== Transactions ==
The Bucks have been involved in the following transactions during the 2007–08 season.

=== Free agents ===
| Player | Signed | Former team |
| Jake Voskuhl | July 18, 2007 | Charlotte Bobcats |
| Desmond Mason | July 23, 2007 | New Orleans Hornets |
| Awvee Storey | August 7, 2007 | Dakota Wizards |
| Royal Ivey | September 17, 2007 | Atlanta Hawks |
| Michael Ruffin | September 22, 2007 | Washington Wizards |

== See also ==
- 2007–08 NBA season
