= Osceola Magic =

American professional basketball team of the NBA G League

- Conference: Eastern
- League: NBA G League
- Founded: 2008
- History: Erie BayHawks; 2008–2017; Lakeland Magic; 2017–2023; Osceola Magic; 2023–present
- Arena: Silver Spurs Arena
- Location: Kissimmee, Florida
- Team colors: Black, blue, silver
- Team manager: Kevin Tiller II
- Head coach: Dylan Murphy
- Ownership: Orlando Magic
- Affiliation: Orlando Magic
- Championships: 1 (2021)
- Conference titles: 1 (2025)
- Division titles: 1 (2019)
- Website: osceola.gleague.nba.com

The Osceola Magic are an American professional basketball team in the NBA G League based in Kissimmee, Florida. They are affiliated with the Orlando Magic, and play their home games at the Silver Spurs Arena. The Magic began play in the 2017–18 season as the Lakeland Magic. They have won one championship.

The franchise was previously based in Erie, Pennsylvania, and known as the Erie BayHawks until their move to Lakeland in 2018. The franchise was known as the Lakeland Magic until April 11, 2023, when the Orlando Magic announced that the team would move to Kissimmee beginning in November 2023 and be renamed the Osceola Magic.

== History ==
=== Erie BayHawks (2008–2017) ===
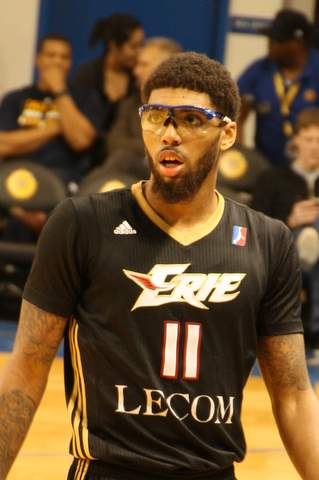
Devyn Marble with the BayHawks in 2016

The Erie BayHawks were established in 2008 as an expansion team in the NBA Development League (D-League), originally affiliated with the Cleveland Cavaliers and the Philadelphia 76ers. The "BayHawks" name alluded to the Presque Isle Bay, on which the city of Erie lies. The hawk represents the city's wildlife and naval history, especially because hawks were used by naval expeditions to send important messages. The team's colors of black, red, and gold paid homage to the Erie-based Commodore Oliver Hazard Perry and to the United States Navy uniforms worn during the War of 1812. The team was affiliated with the Toronto Raptors from 2009 to 2011. The team home court was Erie Insurance Arena.

The affiliation with the Cavaliers lasted until 2011 when Cleveland obtained their own affiliate in the Canton Charge. The BayHawks then affiliated with the New York Knicks. Under the Knicks' affiliation, the BayHawks made headlines on January 17, 2012, when Jeremy Lin was assigned to the team. On January 20, he had a triple-double with 28 points, 11 rebounds, and 12 assists in the BayHawks' 122–113 victory over the Maine Red Claws. Lin was recalled by the Knicks three days later. In December 2012, the Knicks assigned NBA veteran Amar'e Stoudemire to the BayHawks because of an injury.

In 2012, the Knicks offered the BayHawks head coach position to Patrick Ewing, one of their most prominent alumni. However, he turned down the offer citing his preference to coach in the NBA instead of the G League. Ewing ultimately worked as an assistant coach for the Washington Wizards, Houston Rockets, and Orlando Magic before accepting a position as the head coach of his alma mater, Georgetown University in 2017.

In 2014, the Knicks ended their affiliation with Erie in favor of starting an expansion D-League franchise, the Westchester Knicks, forcing the BayHawks to find a new affiliate. In April 2014, the BayHawks entered talks for a hybrid relationship with the Orlando Magic and a deal was announced May 19, 2014.

=== Lakeland Magic (2017–2023) ===
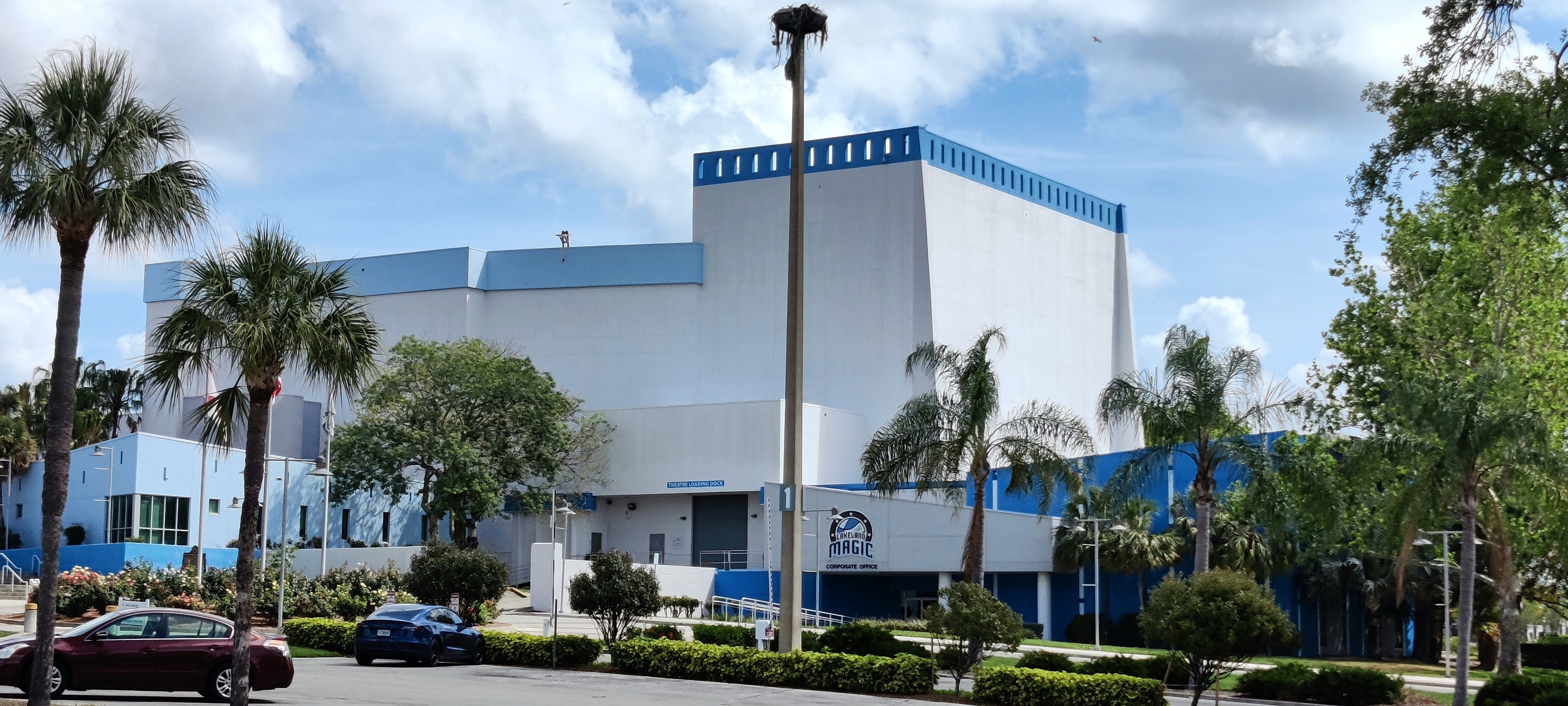
The Magic formerly played their home games at the RP Funding Center in downtown Lakeland.

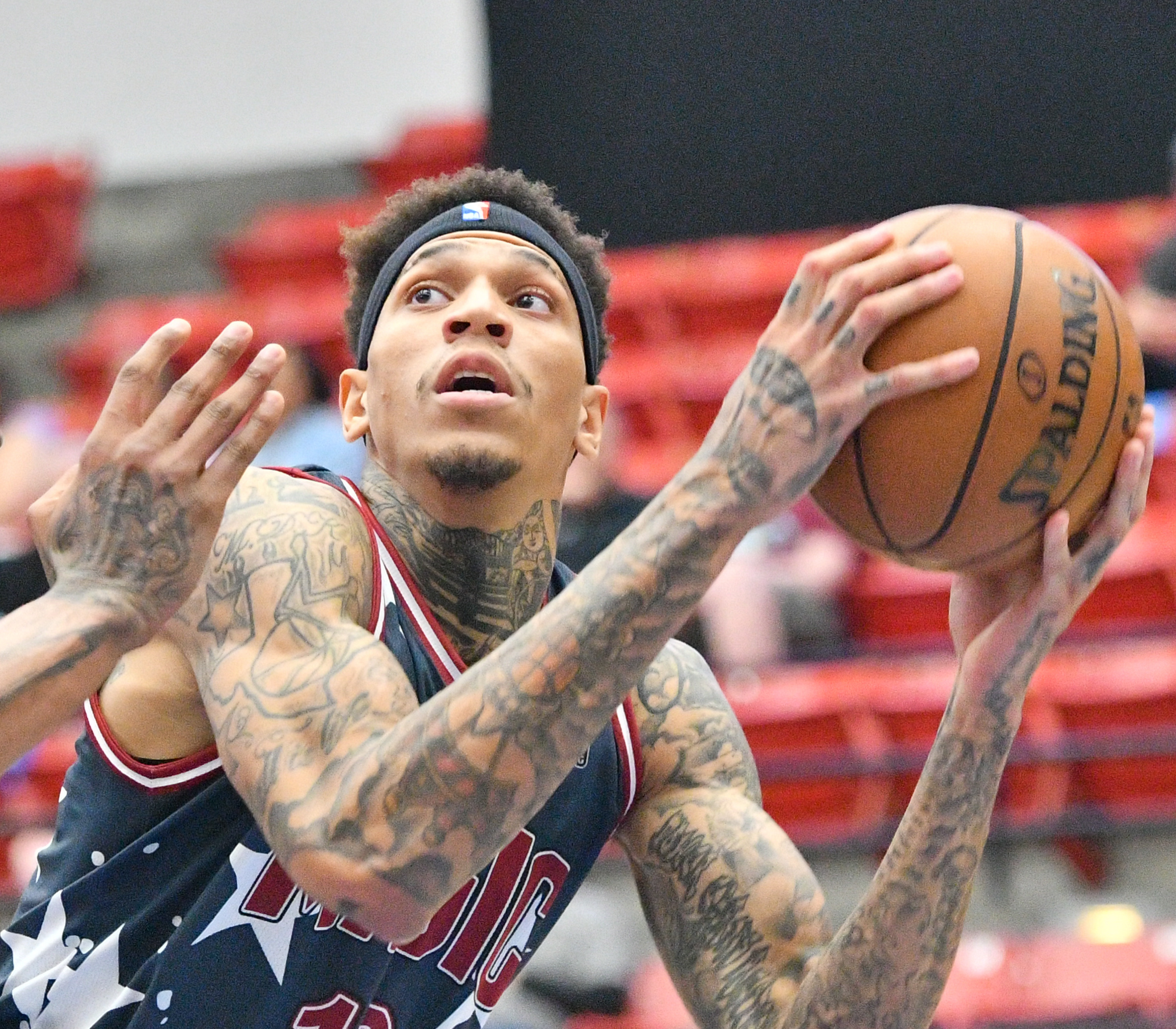
Michale Kyser playing for the Magic, 2020.

In January 2016, the Magic announced their intentions to have their own D-League team in Florida, but stated that it would be an expansion team and not a relocation of the Erie BayHawks. In the original January 6, 2016, announcement, it was announced that the Orlando Magic was seeking to place a D-League team in Florida; the eight initial candidate venues were: Bay Lake (ESPN Wide World of Sports Complex), Daytona Beach (Ocean Center), Estero (Germain Arena), Fort Myers (Lee Civic Center), Jacksonville (Jacksonville Veterans Memorial Arena), Kissimmee (Silver Spurs Arena), Lakeland (Lakeland Center), and Orlando (CFE Arena). On February 17, the Magic narrowed their choices down to Bay Lake, Jacksonville, Lakeland, and Kissimmee. On June 30, the Magic named Kissimmee and Lakeland as the two finalists.

However, in December 2016, the Magic announced that they had purchased the BayHawks' franchise and that they would be relocating it to Lakeland, Florida, for the 2017–18 season, becoming the seventeenth NBA team to own a D-League franchise. They would also build a practice facility in nearby Winter Haven. On April 12, 2017, it was announced that the team would be named the Lakeland Magic. On August 8, 2017, Stan Heath was named as the head coach and Anthony Parker as the general manager.

In response to the purchase, the BayHawks' local management and former owners also announced that they were attempting to secure another franchise to replace the now Magic-owned BayHawks franchise to play in Erie. In January 2017, it was announced that the Atlanta Hawks would temporarily place their D-League affiliate in Erie for the 2017–18 and 2018–19 seasons under the operations of the former BayHawks management as a new BayHawks team. The Atlanta Hawks had already announced their intentions of placing their D-League franchise in College Park, Georgia, for the 2019–20 season. Before the 2017–18 season, the league rebranded to the NBA G League via a sponsorship with Gatorade.

The Magic won the league championship in the COVID-19 pandemic-shortened season in 2021. Head coach Heath won coach of the year and then took the head coaching position with the Eastern Michigan Eagles. Associate coach Joe Barrer was then named his replacement. Anthony Parker was promoted to assistant general manager in Orlando and Adetunji Adedipe was promoted to general manager in October 2021 after serving as an assistant manager since 2017 and working for the Magic organization since 2015.

=== Osceola Magic (2023–present) ===
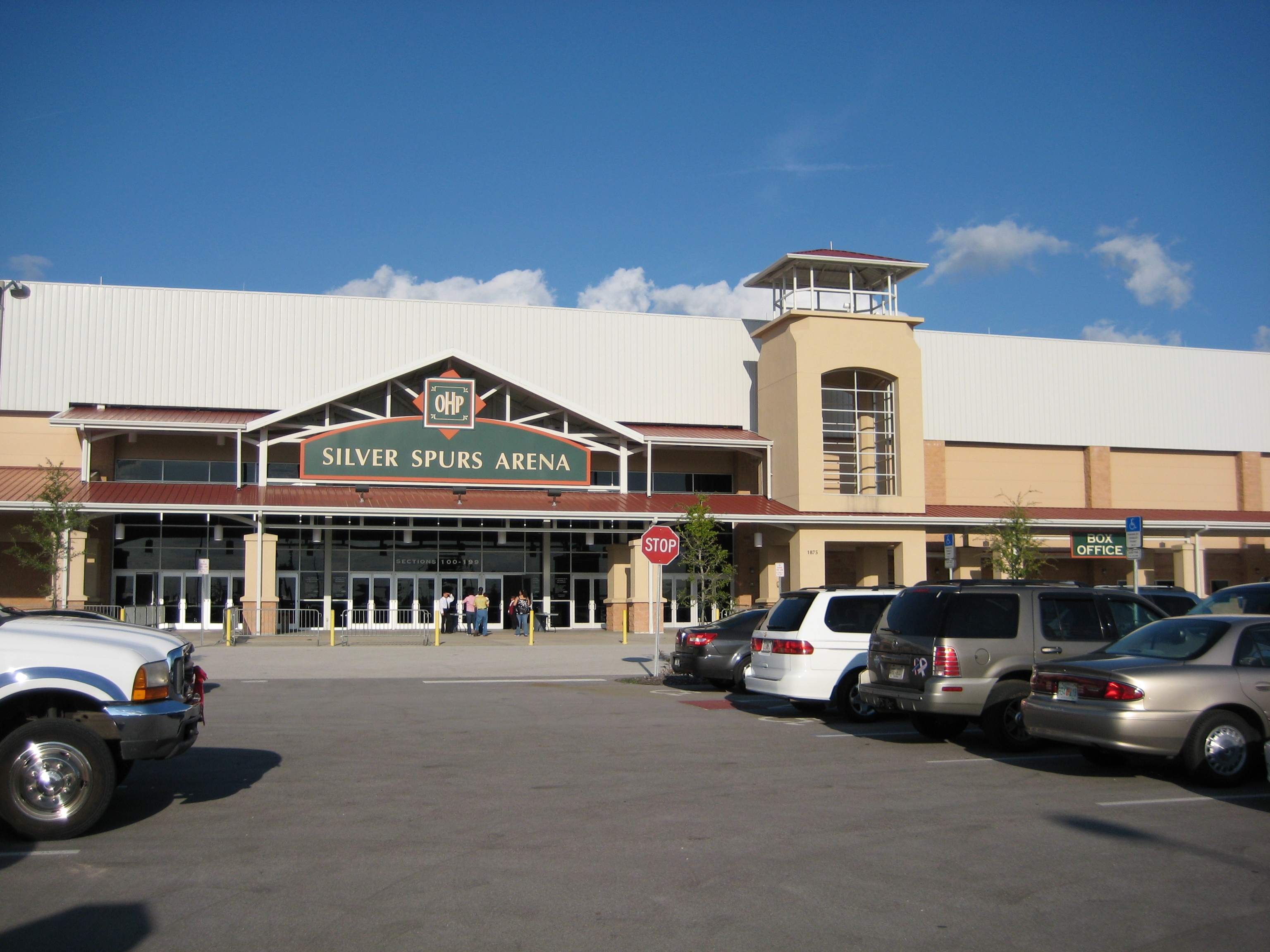
The Magic currently play their home games at Silver Spurs Arena in Kissimmee.

The first logo as the Osceola Magic, used from 2023 to 2025.

On April 11, 2023, the Orlando Magic announced they would be relocating their G League affiliate to Osceola in order to be closer to Orlando. The team will be based out of Osceola Heritage Park and play at Silver Spurs Arena.

== Season by season ==
Season	Conference	Division	Finish	Wins	Losses	Pct.	Postseason
Erie BayHawks
2008–09	—	Central	3rd	27	23	.540	Lost First Round (Colorado) 108–129
2009–10	Eastern	—	6th	21	29	.420	
2010–11	Eastern	—	2nd	32	18	.640	Lost First Round (Reno) 1–2
2011–12	Eastern	—	3rd	28	22	.560	Lost First Round (Austin) 1–2
2012–13	Eastern	—	4th	26	24	.520	
2013–14	—	Eastern	5th	16	34	.320	
2014–15	Eastern	Atlantic	3rd	24	26	.480	
2015–16	Eastern	Atlantic	5th	12	38	.240	
2016–17	Eastern	Atlantic	6th	14	36	.280	
Lakeland Magic
2017–18	Eastern	Southeast	2nd	28	22	.560	Lost First Round (Erie) 90–96
2018–19	Eastern	Southeast	1st	32	18	.640	Won Semifinal (Westchester) 104–91; Lost Conference Final (Long Island) 106–108
2019–20	Eastern	Southeast	1st	25	17	.595	Season cancelled by COVID-19 pandemic
2020–21	—	—	6th	9	6	.600	Won Quarterfinal (Erie) 139–110; Won Semifinal (Santa Cruz) 108–96; Won Championship (Delaware) 97–78
2021–22	Eastern	—	12th	11	21	.344	
2022–23	Eastern	—	8th	18	14	.563	
Osceola Magic
2023–24	Eastern	—	1st	22	12	.647	Lost Semifinal (Long Island) 112–120
2024–25	Eastern	—	1st	22	12	.647	Won Semifinal (Indiana) 129–114; Won Conference Final (Maine) 135–122; Lost Championship (Stockton) 1–2
Totals
Totals				345	360	.489	Regular season record
Totals				6	8	.429	Postseason record

== Current roster ==
Osceola Magic roster
Players

Pos.	No.	Player	Height	Weight	DOB	From
G	13	Ace Baldwin Jr.	6 ft 1 in (1.85 m)	190 lb (86 kg)	2001-06-07	Penn State
C	14	Colin Castleton (TW)	6 ft 10 in (2.08 m)	250 lb (113 kg)	2000-05-25	Florida
G	30	Alex Morales (TW)	6 ft 6 in (1.98 m)	180 lb (82 kg)	1997-11-21	Wagner
F	–	Izaiyah Nelson (TW)	6 ft 10 in (2.08 m)	218 lb (99 kg)	2003-10-01	South Florida
G	24	Lester Quiñones	6 ft 4 in (1.93 m)	205 lb (93 kg)	2000-11-16	Memphis

Coaches
Head coach
- Dylan Murphy
Assistant(s)
- Thomas Bridges
- Corey Hawkins
- Johnny Taylor

Legend
- (DP) Unsigned draft pick
- (FA) Free agent
- (S) Suspended
- (P) Prospects
- (NBA) On assignment from NBA affiliate
- (TW) Two-way affiliate player
- Injured

Roster
Updated: February 20, 2026

== Head coaches ==
#	Head coach	Term	Regular season				Playoffs				Achievements
#	Head coach	Term	G	W	L	Win%	G	W	L	Win%	Achievements
1	John Treloar	2008–2010	100	48	52	.480	1	0	1	.000	
2	Jay Larranaga	2010–2012	100	60	40	.600	6	2	4	.333	
3	Gene Cross	2012–2014	100	42	58	.420	—	—	—	—	
4	Bill Peterson	2014–2017	150	50	100	.333	—	—	—	—	
5	Stan Heath	2017–2021	157	94	63	.599	6	4	2	.667	Won 2021 Championship
6	Joe Barrer	2021–2023	64	29	35	.453	—	—	—	—	
7	Dylan Murphy	2023–2026	68	44	24	.647	1	0	1	—	
8	Ronnie Burrell	2026–present				–				—	

== High points ==
=== Individual awards ===
==== NBADL All-Rookie Second Team ====
- Tasmin Mitchell - 2011

Payton Siva

==== All-NBADL First Team ====
- Erik Daniels - 2009
- Ivan Johnson - 2011

==== All-NBADL Third Team ====
- Alade Aminu - 2010 ^{[a]}

==== NBADL All-Defensive Second Team ====
- Ivan Johnson - 2011

=== All-Star Weekend ===
==== All-Star Game ====
- Erik Daniels - 2009
- Alade Aminu - 2010
- Ivan Johnson - 2011
- Garrett Temple - 2011
- Seth Curry - 2015

== NBA affiliates ==
=== Erie BayHawks (2008–2017) ===
- Cleveland Cavaliers (2008–2011)
- New York Knicks (2011–2014)
- Orlando Magic (2014–2017)
- Philadelphia 76ers (2008–2009)
- Toronto Raptors (2009–2011)

=== Lakeland Magic (2017–2023) ===
- Orlando Magic (2017–2023)

=== Osceola Magic (2023–present) ===
- Orlando Magic (2023–present)

== See also ==
- College Park Skyhawks, second basketball team that assumed the Erie BayHawks name following this team's relocation to Lakeland
- Birmingham Squadron, third basketball franchise to use the Erie BayHawks' name

== Notes ==
^{[a]} Alade Aminu was traded to the Bakersfield Jam after 37 games with the BayHawks.
