= 2007–08 Orlando Magic season =

NBA professional basketball team season

- Division champions
- Head coach: Stan Van Gundy
- President: Bob Vander Weide
- General manager: Otis Smith
- Owner: Richard DeVos
- Arena: Amway Arena

Results
- Record: 52–30 (.634)
- Place: Division: 1st (Southeast); Conference: 3rd (Eastern)
- Playoff finish: Conference Semifinals (lost to Pistons 1–4)
- Stats at Basketball Reference

Local media
- Television: FSN Florida, Sun Sports
- Radio: WDBO

The 2007–08 Orlando Magic season was their 19th season in the National Basketball Association. Led by 22-year-old center Dwight Howard, the Magic finished the season with a 52–30 record, finishing first-place in the Southeast Division and advancing to the Eastern Conference Semi-finals where they were eliminated by the Detroit Pistons in 5 games. The Magic had the fourth best team offensive rating in the NBA.

In the playoffs, the Magic defeated the Toronto Raptors in the first round in five games before losing to the Detroit Pistons in the Semi-finals in five games. This marked the first time since 1996 that the Magic made it to the Semifinals of the playoffs. As from 1997 - 2007, they either were eliminated in the first round or didn't make the playoffs at all.

== Key dates ==
- June 6: The Magic hire Stan Van Gundy as head coach, days after Billy Donovan was signed as head coach and released due to a change of heart from Donovan.
- June 28: The 2007 NBA draft took place in New York City.
- July 1: The free agency period began.
- July 11: The Magic acquired Rashard Lewis from the Seattle SuperSonics.
- September 29: The Magic opened their training camp at the RDV Sportsplex in Maitland, Florida.
- October 31: The Magic's season began with a game against the Milwaukee Bucks.
- March 5: The Magic matched the same number of wins as the previous season by defeating the Washington Wizards.
- March 12: The Magic were assured a winning season after defeating the Los Angeles Clippers.
- March 15: The Magic clinched a playoff berth with a win over the Indiana Pacers.
- March 28: The Magic broke the franchise's previous record of road wins in a season by defeating the Milwaukee Bucks, the Magic's 24th win of the season away from home.
- March 31: Because of a loss by the Washington Wizards, the Magic clinched the Southeast Division title.
- April 16: The Magic played their last game of the regular season.
- April 28: The Magic won their first playoff series in 12 years by defeating the Toronto Raptors 4 games to 1.
- May 13: The Magic were eliminated from the playoffs, losing to the Detroit Pistons 4 games to 1 in the Eastern Conference Semi-finals.

== Offseason ==
Billy Donovan was signed as head coach of the Magic on June 1 agreeing to a 5-year, $27.5 million deal with the team., to replace recently fired Magic head coach Brian Hill. Donovan had previously led the University of Florida basketball team to back to back NCAA National Championships in 2006 and 2007. One day later however, Donovan had second thoughts about becoming head coach of the Magic, and wished to be released from his contract to return to his former team, the Florida Gators Men's basketball team. On June 5, the Magic released Donovan from his 5-year contract, under the condition that he would not be allowed to sign as head coach of another NBA team for five years. One day later, the Magic signed Stan Van Gundy as head coach. The deal was reportedly for 4 years, $16 million.

The Magic made a splash in the free agent market by acquiring small forward Rashard Lewis on July 11. Lewis was re-signed to the Seattle SuperSonics for a six-year league maximum contract, then promptly traded to the Magic in a "sign and trade" for a second-round pick in the 2008 NBA draft. The Sonics earned a mid-level salary cap exemption in the trade. Lewis signed a six-year league-maximum contract believed to be worth over $110 million.

Then the Magic filled in a need and went after a big man after losing Darko Miličić, and signed Center Adonal Foyle who played for the Golden State Warriors and leads the Warriors in most blocks in team history.

The Magic also signed Polish center Marcin Gortat on July 17. They had acquired his NBA rights from the Phoenix Suns following the 2005 NBA draft.

The Magic got final approval for a new arena on July 26, 2007. It is expected to be completed in time for the 2010–11 NBA season.

Point guard Jameer Nelson's father, Floyd "Pete" Nelson, disappeared on August 30, and was found dead in the Delaware River in Wilmington, Delaware, on September 2. A Chester, Pennsylvania, tugboat repairman by trade, the elder Nelson's death was ruled an accident.

== Draft picks ==
Orlando's selections from the 2007 NBA draft in New York City.

Round	Pick	Player	Position	Nationality	College / Club
2	44	Reyshawn Terry	Small forward	United States	North Carolina

== Roster ==
2007–08 Orlando Magic roster
Players

Pos.	No.	Player	Height	Weight	DOB	From
G	30	Carlos Arroyo	6 ft 2 in (1.88 m)	202 lb (92 kg)	1979-07-30	FIU
F	40	James Augustine	6 ft 10 in (2.08 m)	235 lb (107 kg)	1984-02-27	Illinois
F/C	4	Tony Battie	6 ft 11 in (2.11 m)	240 lb (109 kg)	1976-02-11	Texas Tech
G	10	Keith Bogans	6 ft 5 in (1.96 m)	215 lb (98 kg)	1980-05-12	Kentucky
F	34	Brian Cook	6 ft 9 in (2.06 m)	250 lb (113 kg)	1980-12-04	Illinois
G	5	Keyon Dooling	6 ft 3 in (1.91 m)	195 lb (88 kg)	1980-05-08	Missouri
G/F	1	Maurice Evans	6 ft 5 in (1.96 m)	220 lb (100 kg)	1978-11-08	Texas
C	31	Adonal Foyle	6 ft 10 in (2.08 m)	270 lb (122 kg)	1975-03-09	Colgate
F	8	Pat Garrity	6 ft 9 in (2.06 m)	238 lb (108 kg)	1976-08-23	Notre Dame
F/C	13	Marcin Gortat	7 ft 0 in (2.13 m)	240 lb (109 kg)	1984-02-17	Poland
C	12	Dwight Howard	6 ft 11 in (2.11 m)	265 lb (120 kg)	1985-12-08	SW Atlanta Christian Academy HS (GA)
F	9	Rashard Lewis	6 ft 10 in (2.08 m)	230 lb (104 kg)	1979-08-08	Alief Elsik HS (TX)
G	14	Jameer Nelson	6 ft 0 in (1.83 m)	195 lb (88 kg)	1982-02-09	Saint Joseph's
G	7	JJ Redick	6 ft 4 in (1.93 m)	190 lb (86 kg)	1984-06-24	Duke
G/F	15	Hedo Türkoğlu	6 ft 10 in (2.08 m)	220 lb (100 kg)	1979-03-19	Turkey

Coaches
Head coach
- Stan Van Gundy
Assistant(s)
- Bob Beyer
- Steve Clifford
- Patrick Ewing
- Brendan Malone

Legend
- (DP) Unsigned draft pick
- (FA) Free agent
- (S) Suspended
- Injured

Roster
Updated: December 2, 2007

== Regular season ==
=== Standings ===
Southeast Division	W	L	PCT	GB	Home	Road	Div
y-Orlando Magic	52	30	.634	–	25–16	27–14	12–4
x-Washington Wizards	43	39	.500	9	25–16	18–23	10–6
x-Atlanta Hawks	37	45	.451	15	25–16	12–29	9–7
Charlotte Bobcats	32	50	.390	20	21–20	11–30	7–9
Miami Heat	15	67	.183	37	9–32	6–35	2–14

Eastern Conference
#	Team	W	L	PCT	GB
1	z-Boston Celtics	66	16	.805	–
2	y-Detroit Pistons	59	23	.732	7
3	y-Orlando Magic	52	30	.634	14
4	x-Cleveland Cavaliers	45	37	.549	21
5	x-Washington Wizards	43	39	.524	23
6	x-Toronto Raptors	41	41	.500	25
7	x-Philadelphia 76ers	40	42	.488	26
8	x-Atlanta Hawks	37	45	.451	29
9	Indiana Pacers	36	46	.439	30
10	New Jersey Nets	34	48	.415	32
11	Chicago Bulls	33	49	.402	33
12	Charlotte Bobcats	32	50	.390	34
13	Milwaukee Bucks	26	56	.317	40
14	New York Knicks	23	59	.280	43
15	Miami Heat	15	67	.183	51

=== Game log ===
==== October ====
Record: 1–0; home: 1–0; road: 0–0

#	Date	Visitor	Score	Home	OT	Leading scorer	Attendance	Record
1	October 31, 2007	Bucks	102–83	Magic	NA	Rashard Lewis (26)	17,519	1–0

==== November ====
Record: 13–4; home: 4–2; road: 9–2

#	Date	Visitor	Score	Home	OT	Leading scorer	Attendance	Record
2	November 2, 2007	Pistons	116–92	Magic	NA	Rashard Lewis (21)	17,519	1–1
3	November 3, 2007	Magic	94–82	Wizards	NA	Hedo Türkoğlu (25)	20,173	2–1
4	November 6, 2007	Magic	111–103	Timberwolves	NA	Dwight Howard (28)	12,003	3–1
5	November 7, 2007	Magic	105–96	Raptors	NA	Two-way tie (24)	17,997	4–1
6	November 9, 2007	Magic	112–102	Knicks	NA	Jameer Nelson (24)	19,763	5–1
7	November 10, 2007	Suns	106–96	Magic	NA	Dwight Howard (33)	17,519	5–2
8	November 13, 2007	SuperSonics	76–103	Magic	NA	Rashard Lewis (22)	16,101	6–2
9	November 14, 2007	Magic	117–116	Cavaliers	1	Dwight Howard (35)	20,562	7–2
10	November 16, 2007	Magic	95–70	Nets	NA	Rashard Lewis (27)	15,115	8–2
11	November 18, 2007	Celtics	102–104	Magic	NA	Dwight Howard (24)	17,519	9–2
12	November 19, 2007	Magic	95–88	Hornets	NA	Dwight Howard (24)	11,741	10–2
13	November 21, 2007	Magic	110–128	Spurs	NA	Dwight Howard (34)	18,797	10–3
14	November 23, 2007	Bobcats	92–105	Magic	NA	Dwight Howard (34)	17,136	11–3
15	November 24, 2007	Heat	99–120	Magic	NA	Hedo Türkoğlu (27)	17,519	12–3
16	November 26, 2007	Magic	85–74	Trail Blazers	NA	Hedo Türkoğlu (21)	15,922	13–3
17	November 28, 2007	Magic	110–94	SuperSonics	NA	Dwight Howard (39)	12,398	14–3
18	November 30, 2007	Magic	106–110	Suns	NA	Dwight Howard (30)	18,422	14–4

==== December ====
Record: 8–7; home: 2–4; road: 6–3

#	Date	Visitor	Score	Home	OT	Leading scorer	Attendance	Record
19	December 2, 2007	Magic	104–97	Lakers	NA	Rashard Lewis (18)	18,997	15–4
20	December 3, 2007	Magic	123–117	Warriors	1	Two-way tie (22)	18,527	16–4
21	December 8, 2007	Pacers	115–109	Magic	NA	Dwight Howard (30)	17,519	16–5
22	December 10, 2007	Hawks	98–87	Magic	NA	Hedo Türkoğlu (22)	16,821	16–6
23	December 12, 2007	Magic	86–100	Bucks	NA	Two-way tie (20)	14,617	16–7
24	December 14, 2007	Magic	103–87	Bobcats	NA	Dwight Howard (33)	19,109	17–7
25	December 15, 2007	Grizzlies	123–119	Magic	NA	Dwight Howard (31)	17,519	17–8
26	December 17, 2007	Magic	108–111	Mavericks	NA	Hedo Türkoğlu (26)	20,114	17–9
27	December 19, 2007	Magic	97–92	Rockets	NA	Dwight Howard (21)	18,270	18–9
28	December 21, 2007	Jazz	113–94	Magic	NA	Hedo Türkoğlu (27)	17,519	18–10
29	December 23, 2007	Magic	91–103	Celtics	NA	Dwight Howard (23)	18,624	18–11
30	December 26, 2007	Knicks	96–110	Magic	NA	Hedo Türkoğlu (26)	17,519	19–11
31	December 28, 2007	Magic	121–114	Heat	1	Dwight Howard (29)	19,805	20–11
32	December 29, 2007	Bobcats	95–104	Magic	NA	Hedo Türkoğlu (28)	17,519	21–11
33	December 31, 2007	Magic	112–110	Bulls	1	Jameer Nelson (29)	22,126	22–11

==== January ====
Record: 7–7; home: 5–2; road: 2–5

#	Date	Visitor	Score	Home	OT	Leading scorer	Attendance	Record
34	January 2, 2008	Nets	96–95	Magic	NA	Hedo Türkoğlu (23)	17,519	22–12
35	January 4, 2008	Rockets	96–94	Magic	NA	Jameer Nelson (20)	17,519	22–13
36	January 8, 2008	Magic	100–104	Kings	NA	Dwight Howard (29)	12,831	22–14
37	January 9, 2008	Magic	113–106	Clippers	NA	Hedo Türkoğlu (28)	15,091	23–14
38	January 11, 2008	Magic	103–113	Nuggets	NA	Rashard Lewis (21)	16,718	23–15
39	January 12, 2008	Magic	115–119	Jazz	NA	Dwight Howard (29)	19,911	23–16
40	January 15, 2008	Bulls	88–102	Magic	NA	Rashard Lewis (26)	17,519	24–16
41	January 16, 2008	Magic	93–99	Bobcats	NA	Dwight Howard (24)	14,279	24–17
42	January 19, 2008	Trail Blazers	94–101	Magic	NA	Hedo Türkoğlu (20)	17,519	25–17
43	January 21, 2008	Pistons	100–102	Magic	NA	Hedo Türkoğlu (26)	17,519	26–17
44	January 23, 2008	Magic	112–85	Grizzlies	NA	Hedo Türkoğlu (26)	10,212	27–17
45	January 25, 2008	Magic	93–101	Pistons	NA	Hedo Türkoğlu (23)	22,076	27–18
46	January 27, 2008	Celtics	93–96	Magic	NA	Hedo Türkoğlu (27)	17,519	28–18
47	January 30, 2008	Heat	91–107	Magic	NA	Hedo Türkoğlu (27)	17,519	29–18

==== February ====
Record: 8–5; home: 4–3; road: 4–2

#	Date	Visitor	Score	Home	OT	Leading scorer	Attendance	Record
48	February 1, 2008	Magic	108–106	76ers	NA	Hedo Türkoğlu (23)	16,513	30–18
49	February 2, 2008	Magic	121–115	Pacers	NA	Dwight Howard (24)	13,172	31–18
50	February 4, 2008	Mavericks	107–98	Magic	NA	Dwight Howard (28)	16,974	31–19
51	February 6, 2008	Nets	84–100	Magic	NA	Dwight Howard (21)	16,011	32–19
52	February 8, 2008	Lakers	117–113	Magic	NA	Dwight Howard (19)	17,519	32–20
53	February 11, 2008	Cavaliers	118–111	Magic	NA	Hedo Türkoğlu (25)	17,519	32–21
54	February 13, 2008	Nuggets	98–109	Magic	NA	Rashard Lewis (25)	17,519	33–21
55	February 19, 2008	Magic	103–85	Pistons	NA	Rashard Lewis (20)	22,076	34–21
56	February 20, 2008	Magic	110–127	Raptors	NA	Dwight Howard (37)	19,800	34–22
57	February 22, 2008	76ers	99–115	Magic	NA	Hedo Türkoğlu (31)	17,519	35–22
58	February 24, 2008	Kings	93–112	Magic	NA	Dwight Howard (26)	17,519	36–22
59	February 26, 2008	Magic	102–92	Nets	NA	Two-way tie (25)	14,847	37–22
60	February 27, 2008	Magic	89–101	76ers	NA	Hedo Türkoğlu (20)	14,847	37–23

==== March ====
Record: 10–4; home: 7–3; road: 3–1

#	Date	Visitor	Score	Home	OT	Leading scorer	Attendance	Record
61	March 1, 2008	Knicks	92–118	Magic	NA	Dwight Howard (26)	17,519	38–23
62	March 4, 2008	Raptors	82–107	Magic	NA	Hedo Türkoğlu (24)	17,519	39–23
63	March 5, 2008	Magic	122–92	Wizards	NA	Dwight Howard (20)	17,745	40–23
64	March 8, 2008	Warriors	104–95	Magic	NA	Dwight Howard (26)	17,519	40–24
65	March 10, 2008	Hawks	112–123	Magic	NA	Dwight Howard (26)	15,921	41–24
66	March 12, 2008	Clippers	88–110	Magic	NA	Dwight Howard (22)	16,312	42–24
67	March 14, 2008	Magic	103–94	Heat	NA	Jameer Nelson (21)	19,312	43–24
68	March 15, 2008	Pacers	111–122	Magic	NA	Hedo Türkoğlu (27)	17,519	44–24
69	March 17, 2008	Cavaliers	90–104	Magic	NA	Dwight Howard (23)	17,519	45–24
70	March 19, 2008	Wizards	87–86	Magic	NA	Hedo Türkoğlu (39)	16,533	45–25
71	March 21, 2008	76ers	95–113	Magic	NA	Rashard Lewis (18)	17,519	46–25
72	March 22, 2008	Magic	90–98	Hawks	NA	Hedo Türkoğlu (18)	18,825	46–26
73	March 25, 2008	Spurs	107–97	Magic	NA	Two-way tie (24)	17,519	46–27
74	March 28, 2008	Magic	103–86	Bucks	NA	Dwight Howard (25)	17,531	47–27

==== April ====
Record: 5–3; home: 2–2; road: 3–1

#	Date	Visitor	Score	Home	OT	Leading scorer	Attendance	Record
75	April 1, 2008	Hornets	98–97	Magic	NA	Hedo Türkoğlu (26)	17,519	47–28
76	April 5, 2008	Magic	101–86	Cavaliers	NA	Hedo Türkoğlu (23)	20,562	48–28
77	April 6, 2008	Magic	90–100	Knicks	NA	Hedo Türkoğlu (23)	19,763	48–29
78	April 9, 2008	Bulls	83–115	Magic	NA	Dwight Howard (30)	17,519	49–29
79	April 11, 2008	Timberwolves	102–101	Magic	NA	Hedo Türkoğlu (23)	17,593	49–30
80	April 13, 2008	Magic	104–84	Bulls	NA	Hedo Türkoğlu (24)	21,973	50–30
81	April 15, 2008	Magic	121–105	Hawks	NA	Maurice Evans (27)	18,738	51–30
82	April 16, 2008	Wizards	82–103	Magic	NA	JJ Redick (18)	16,929	52–30

- Green background indicates win.
- Red background indicates loss.

== Playoffs ==
2008 playoff game log
First Round: 4–1 (home: 3–0; road: 1–1)

Game	Date	Team	Score	High points	High rebounds	High assists	Location Attendance	Series
1	April 20	Toronto	114–100	Howard (25)	Howard (22)	Nelson (7)	Amway Arena; 17,519	1–0
2	April 22	Toronto	104–103	Howard (29)	Howard (20)	Two-Way Tie (5)	Amway Arena; 17,519	2–0
3	April 24	@ Toronto	94–108	Türkoğlu (26)	Howard (12)	Nelson (6)	Air Canada Centre; 20,023	2–1
4	April 26	@ Toronto	106–94	Lewis (26)	Howard (16)	Two-Way Tie (5)	Air Canada Centre; 20,416	3–1
5	April 28	Toronto	102–92	Howard (21)	Howard (21)	Türkoğlu (9)	Amway Arena; 17,519	4–1

Conference Semifinals: 1–4 (home: 1–1; road: 0–3)

Game	Date	Team	Score	High points	High rebounds	High assists	Location Attendance	Series
1	May 3	@ Detroit	72–91	Two-Way Tie (18)	Howard (8)	Nelson (5)	The Palace of Auburn Hills; 22,076	0–1
2	May 5	@ Detroit	93–100	Howard, Nelson (22)	Howard (18)	Türkoğlu (7)	The Palace of Auburn Hills; 22,076	0–2
3	May 7	Detroit	111–86	Lewis (33)	Howard (12)	Türkoğlu (6)	Amway Arena; 17,519	1–2
4	May 10	Detroit	89–90	Türkoğlu (20)	Howard (12)	Nelson (6)	Amway Arena; 17,519	1–3
5	May 13	@ Detroit	86–91	Türkoğlu (18)	Howard (17)	Türkoğlu (7)	The Palace of Auburn Hills; 22,076	1–4

2008 playoff schedule

== Player statistics ==
=== Regular season ===
Player	POS	GP	GS	MP	REB	AST	STL	BLK	PTS	MPG	RPG	APG	SPG	BPG	PPG
Dwight Howard	C	82	82	3,088	1,161	110	74	176	1,695	37.7	14.2	1.3	.9	2.1	20.7
Hedo Türkoğlu	SF	82	82	3,026	471	409	74	25	1,602	36.9	5.7	5.0	.9	.3	19.5
Keith Bogans	SG	82	35	2,198	266	104	59	10	711	26.8	3.2	1.3	.7	.1	8.7
Adonal Foyle	C	82	0	774	208	18	16	45	156	9.4	2.5	.2	.2	.5	1.9
Rashard Lewis	PF	81	81	3,076	437	196	99	38	1,476	38.0	5.4	2.4	1.2	.5	18.2
Keyon Dooling	PG	72	1	1,334	101	133	36	5	581	18.5	1.4	1.8	.5	.1	8.1
Jameer Nelson	PG	69	62	1,961	243	383	63	4	755	28.4	3.5	5.6	.9	.1	10.9
Maurice Evans^{†}	SG	68	47	1,624	209	69	41	9	633	23.9	3.1	1.0	.6	.1	9.3
Carlos Arroyo	PG	62	20	1,269	113	219	26	2	430	20.5	1.8	3.5	.4	.0	6.9
Brian Cook^{†}	PF	45	0	559	99	24	11	12	224	12.4	2.2	.5	.2	.3	5.0
JJ Redick	SG	34	0	276	23	16	4	0	140	8.1	.7	.5	.1	.0	4.1
Pat Garrity	PF	31	0	284	44	13	6	1	66	9.2	1.4	.4	.2	.0	2.1
James Augustine	PF	25	0	149	30	2	5	2	40	6.0	1.2	.1	.2	.1	1.6
Trevor Ariza^{†}	SF	11	0	115	24	8	5	3	36	10.5	2.2	.7	.5	.3	3.3
Marcin Gortat	C	6	0	41	16	2	1	1	18	6.8	2.7	.3	.2	.2	3.0
Bo Outlaw	PF	2	0	7	0	0	0	0	4	3.5	.0	.0	.0	.0	2.0

- ^{†} Denotes player spent time with another team in the season. Stats reflect time with the Magic only.

=== Playoffs ===
Player	POS	GP	GS	MP	REB	AST	STL	BLK	PTS	MPG	RPG	APG	SPG	BPG	PPG
Dwight Howard	C	10	10	421	158	9	8	34	189	42.1	15.8	.9	.8	3.4	18.9
Rashard Lewis	PF	10	10	417	72	34	11	5	195	41.7	7.2	3.4	1.1	.5	19.5
Hedo Türkoğlu	SF	10	10	399	64	55	8	2	175	39.9	6.4	5.5	.8	.2	17.5
Jameer Nelson	PG	10	10	333	41	47	3	2	162	33.3	4.1	4.7	.3	.2	16.2
Maurice Evans	SG	10	10	282	25	7	8	1	90	28.2	2.5	.7	.8	.1	9.0
Keith Bogans	SG	10	0	293	42	11	4	0	73	29.3	4.2	1.1	.4	.0	7.3
Keyon Dooling	PG	10	0	148	10	7	6	1	66	14.8	1.0	.7	.6	.1	6.6
Marcin Gortat	C	8	0	48	8	0	0	4	10	6.0	1.0	.0	.0	.5	1.3
Carlos Arroyo	PG	4	0	30	2	4	0	0	6	7.5	.5	1.0	.0	.0	1.5
Adonal Foyle	C	3	0	11	3	0	0	0	2	3.7	1.0	.0	.0	.0	.7
JJ Redick	SG	2	0	10	1	0	0	0	0	5.0	.5	.0	.0	.0	.0
Pat Garrity	PF	2	0	6	2	0	0	0	1	3.0	1.0	.0	.0	.0	.5
James Augustine	PF	1	0	2	1	0	0	0	2	2.0	1.0	.0	.0	.0	2.0

== Awards and records ==
- Dwight Howard – All-NBA 1st Team, All-Defensive 2nd Team, Rebounding Champion, Slam Dunk Contest Champion, All-Star
- Hedo Türkoğlu – Most Improved Player

== Transactions ==
The Magic have been involved in the following transactions during the 2007–08 season.

=== Trades ===
In November 2007 the Magic traded Trevor Ariza to the Los Angeles Lakers for Maurice Evans and Brian Cook.

=== Free agents ===
Player	Former team
Rashard Lewis	Seattle SuperSonics

Player	New team
Grant Hill	Phoenix Suns
Darko Miličić	Memphis Grizzlies
