= 2007–08 Detroit Pistons season =

NBA team season

- Division champions
- Head coach: Flip Saunders
- President: Joe Dumars
- General manager: Joe Dumars
- Owner: Bill Davidson
- Arena: The Palace of Auburn Hills

Results
- Record: 59–23 (.720)
- Place: Division: 1st (Central); Conference: 2nd (Eastern)
- Playoff finish: Eastern Conference Finals (lost to Celtics 2–4)
- Stats at Basketball Reference

Local media
- Television: FSN Detroit; WMYD
- Radio: WDFN

The 2007–08 Detroit Pistons season was the 67th season of the franchise, the 60th in the National Basketball Association (NBA), and the 51st in the Detroit area. The Central Division Pistons finished the regular season with a 59–23 record, 14 games ahead of the second place Cavaliers. Their 59 wins were the third most in franchise history. In the NBA Playoffs, Detroit advanced to the Eastern Conference finals for the sixth consecutive time since 2003, making them the first team since the 1986–87 Los Angeles Lakers to appear that many consecutive times in their respective Conference finals. The Pistons lost to the eventual NBA champions Boston Celtics in the Eastern Conference finals two games to four. The Pistons had the seventh best team offensive rating in the NBA.

Following the season, Flip Saunders was fired as head coach. This was Chauncey Billups' final full season with the Pistons as he was traded to the Denver Nuggets the following season.

Detroit played its home games at The Palace of Auburn Hills in Auburn Hills, Michigan, which was sold out for each of the 41 regular season home games and all nine playoff games. The Pistons wore the #50 on the upper left side of their jerseys in honor of the 50th anniversary of them playing in Detroit. This season would be the last time the Pistons had a winning record until 2016, as well as the last time they placed better than 8th in the conference or won a playoff game until 2025. In addition, the Pistons would not win another home playoff game or playoff series until 2026.

== Offseason ==
In the offseason, the Pistons re-signed guard Chauncey Billups and forward Amir Johnson. They also signed forward Antonio McDyess to a 2-year contract extension and center Cheikh Samb.

=== Draft picks ===
Detroit's selections from the 2007 NBA draft in New York.

Round	Pick	Player	Position	Nationality	School/Club team
1	15	Rodney Stuckey	Point/Shooting Guard	United States	Eastern Washington
1	27	Arron Afflalo	Shooting Guard	United States	UCLA
2	57	Sammy Mejia	Point Guard	United States	DePaul

== Roster ==
2007–08 Detroit Pistons roster
Players

Pos.	No.	Player	Height	Weight	DOB	From
SG	28	Arron Afflalo	6 ft 5 in (1.96 m)	215 lb (98 kg)	1985-10-15	UCLA
PG	1	Chauncey Billups	6 ft 3 in (1.91 m)	202 lb (92 kg)	1976-09-25	Colorado
PG	8	Juan Dixon	6 ft 3 in (1.91 m)	164 lb (74 kg)	1978-10-09	Maryland
SG	32	Richard Hamilton	6 ft 7 in (2.01 m)	193 lb (88 kg)	1978-02-14	Connecticut
SF	9	Jarvis Hayes	6 ft 8 in (2.03 m)	228 lb (103 kg)	1981-08-09	Georgia
PF	5	Wálter Herrmann	6 ft 9 in (2.06 m)	225 lb (102 kg)	1979-06-26	Argentina
PG	10	Lindsey Hunter	6 ft 2 in (1.88 m)	195 lb (88 kg)	1970-12-03	Jackson State
PF	25	Amir Johnson	6 ft 11 in (2.11 m)	220 lb (100 kg)	1987-05-01	Westchester HS (CA)
C	54	Jason Maxiell	6 ft 7 in (2.01 m)	260 lb (118 kg)	1983-02-18	Cincinnati
PF	24	Antonio McDyess	6 ft 9 in (2.06 m)	245 lb (111 kg)	1974-09-07	Alabama
SF	22	Tayshaun Prince	6 ft 9 in (2.06 m)	215 lb (98 kg)	1980-02-28	Kentucky
C	42	Theo Ratliff	6 ft 10 in (2.08 m)	235 lb (107 kg)	1973-04-17	Wyoming
C	35	Cheikh Samb (DL)	7 ft 1 in (2.16 m)	220 lb (100 kg)	1984-10-22	Senegal
PG	3	Rodney Stuckey	6 ft 5 in (1.96 m)	205 lb (93 kg)	1986-04-21	Eastern Washington
C	36	Rasheed Wallace	6 ft 11 in (2.11 m)	230 lb (104 kg)	1974-09-17	North Carolina

Coaches
Head coach
- Flip Saunders
Assistant(s)
- Dave Cowens
- Michael Curry
- Igor Kokoškov
- Terry Porter

Legend
- (DP) Unsigned draft pick
- (FA) Free agent
- (S) Suspended
- (DL) On assignment to D-League affiliate
- Injured

Roster
Updated: March 21, 2008

== Regular season ==
=== Season standings ===
Central Division	W	L	PCT	GB	Home	Road	Div
y-Detroit Pistons	59	23	.732	–	34–7	25–16	11–5
x-Cleveland Cavaliers	45	37	.549	14	27–14	18–23	7–9
Indiana Pacers	36	46	.439	23	21–20	15–26	5–11
Chicago Bulls	33	49	.402	26	20–21	13–28	11–5
Milwaukee Bucks	26	56	.317	33	19–22	7–34	6–10

Eastern Conference
#	Team	W	L	PCT	GB
1	z-Boston Celtics	66	16	.805	–
2	y-Detroit Pistons	59	23	.732	7
3	y-Orlando Magic	52	30	.634	14
4	x-Cleveland Cavaliers	45	37	.549	21
5	x-Washington Wizards	43	39	.524	23
6	x-Toronto Raptors	41	41	.500	25
7	x-Philadelphia 76ers	40	42	.488	26
8	x-Atlanta Hawks	37	45	.451	29
9	Indiana Pacers	36	46	.439	30
10	New Jersey Nets	34	48	.415	32
11	Chicago Bulls	33	49	.402	33
12	Charlotte Bobcats	32	50	.390	34
13	Milwaukee Bucks	26	56	.317	40
14	New York Knicks	23	59	.280	43
15	Miami Heat	15	67	.183	51

=== Game log ===
2007–08 game log
Total: 59–23 (home: 34–7; road: 25–16)
November: 9–5 (home: 5–1; road: 4–4)

Game	Date	Team	Score	High points	High rebounds	High assists	Location Attendance	Record
1	November 1	@ Miami	W 91–80	Prince (34)	Prince (12)	Billups (11)	American Airlines Arena; 19,600	1–0
2	November 2	@ Orlando	W 116–92	Murray (19)	McDyess, Wallace (7)	Billups (7)	Amway Arena; 17,519	2–0
3	November 4	Atlanta	W 92–91	Billups (22)	McDyess (9)	Billups, Hamilton, Wallace (5)	The Palace of Auburn Hills; 22,076	3–0
4	November 8	@ Chicago	L 97–93	Wallace (36)	McDyess, Wallace (9)	Billups, Hamilton (6)	United Center; 21,797	3–1
5	November 9	LA Clippers	W 103–79	Billups (23)	Maxiell (8)	Hamilton (10)	The Palace of Auburn Hills; 22,076	4–1
6	November 11	@ Seattle	W 107–103	Hamilton (32)	McDyess (15)	Billups, Prince (6)	KeyArena; 16,379	5–1
7	November 13	@ Portland	L 102–94	Prince (20)	Hamilton (7)	Billups (9)	Rose Garden; 19,980	5–2
8	November 14	@ Golden State	W 111–104	Hamilton, Prince, Wallace (22)	Maxiell (14)	Murray (12)	Oracle Arena; 18,923	6–2
9	November 16	@ LA Lakers	L 103–91	Hamilton, Prince (16)	Prince (9)	Murray (6)	Staples Center; 18,997	6–3
10	November 18	@ Sacramento	L 105–95	Prince (19)	Wallace (12)	Billups (9)	ARCO Arena; 12,978	6–4
11	November 21	New York	W 98–86	Billups (25)	McDyess, Mohammed (6)	Billups (15)	The Palace of Auburn Hills; 22,076	7–4
12	November 23	Philadelphia	W 83–78	Prince (15)	Mohammed (9)	Billups (9)	The Palace of Auburn Hills; 22,076	8–4
13	November 25	Utah	L 103–93	McDyess (19)	Mohammed (14)	Hamilton (7)	The Palace of Auburn Hills; 22,076	8–5
14	November 28	Cleveland	W 109–74	Hamilton (18)	Maxiell (10)	Hamilton (6)	The Palace of Auburn Hills; 22,076	9–5

December: 15–2 (home: 8–1; road: 7–1)

Game	Date	Team	Score	High points	High rebounds	High assists	Location Attendance	Record
15	December 1	@ Milwaukee	W 117–91	Wallace (20)	Wallace (10)	Billups (9)	Bradley Center; 17,326	10–5
16	December 2	New Jersey	W 118–95	Hamilton (19)	Maxiell (11)	Billups (9)	The Palace of Auburn Hills; 22,076	11–5
17	December 4	@ Atlanta	W 106–95	Prince (23)	Maxiell (9)	Billups (10)	Philips Arena; 12,754	12–5
18	December 5	@ New Orleans	W 91–76	Hamilton (21)	Wallace (10)	Billups (7)	New Orleans Arena; 10,312	13–5
19	December 7	Chicago	L 98–91	Billups (27)	Prince (8)	Billups (7)	The Palace of Auburn Hills; 22,076	13–6
20	December 9	Charlotte	W 104–85	Billups (20)	McDyess (9)	Billups (6)	The Palace of Auburn Hills; 22,076	14–6
21	December 11	@ Memphis	W 113–103	Billups (28)	Prince (7)	Billups (14)	FedExForum; 11,962	15–6
22	December 12	@ Houston	L 80–77	Wallace (21)	Maxiell (13)	Billups (7)	Toyota Center; 17,453	15–7
23	December 14	Atlanta	W 91–81	Billups (23)	McDyess (14)	Prince (5)	The Palace of Auburn Hills; 22,076	16–7
24	December 16	Golden State	W 109–87	Prince (23)	McDyess (11)	Hamilton (6)	The Palace of Auburn Hills; 22,076	17–7
25	December 19	@ Boston	W 87–85	Billups (28)	Wallace (13)	Billups (8)	TD Banknorth Garden; 18,624	18–7
26	December 21	Memphis	W 94–67	Prince (16)	McDyess (11)	Billups (7)	The Palace of Auburn Hills; 22,076	19–7
27	December 23	Houston	W 94–82	Hamilton (17)	McDyess (11)	Billups (8)	The Palace of Auburn Hills; 22,076	20–7
28	December 26	@ New Jersey	W 101–83	Hamilton (22)	McDyess (9)	Billups (10)	Izod Center; 18,055	21–7
29	December 28	Indiana	W 114–101	Hamilton (23)	Johnson (9)	Hamilton (9)	The Palace of Auburn Hills; 22,076	22–7
30	December 29	@ Indiana	W 98–92	Hamilton (24)	Wallace (10)	Billups (7)	Conseco Fieldhouse; 14,960	23–7
31	December 31	Milwaukee	W 114–69	Hamilton (20)	McDyess (10)	Billups (12)	The Palace of Auburn Hills; 22,076	24–7

January: 9–6 (home: 3–2; road: 6–4)

Game	Date	Team	Score	High points	High rebounds	High assists	Location Attendance	Record
32	January 2	@ Washington	W 106–93	Hamilton (20)	McDyess, Wallace (8)	Hamilton (9)	Verizon Center; 15,763	25–7
33	January 4	@ Toronto	W 101–85	Hamilton (22)	McDyess (12)	Billups (9)	Air Canada Centre; 19,800	26–7
34	January 5	Boston	L 92–85	Hamilton (18)	Wallace (8)	Hamilton (8)	The Palace of Auburn Hills; 22,076	26–8
35	January 9	@ Dallas	L 102–86	Hamilton (18)	Wallace (11)	Herrmann (4)	American Airlines Center; 20,362	26–9
36	January 10	@ San Antonio	W 90–80	Wallace (23)	Wallace (15)	Billups (6)	AT&T Center; 18,797	27–9
37	January 12	@ Charlotte	W 103–100 (OT)	Billups (27)	McDyess (11)	Hamilton (8)	Charlotte Bobcats Arena; 19,091	28–9
38	January 13	@ New York	L 89–65	McDyess (15)	McDyess (13)	Billups (4)	Madison Square Garden; 17,620	28–10
39	January 15	Toronto	W 103–89	Hamilton (39)	McDyess (13)	Hamilton (6)	The Palace of Auburn Hills; 22,076	29–10
40	January 18	Sacramento	L 100–93	Billups (28)	McDyess (11)	Billups (10)	The Palace of Auburn Hills; 22,076	29–11
41	January 19	@ Chicago	L 97–81	Billups (27)	McDyess (12)	Billups (5)	United Center; 22,657	29–12
42	January 21	@ Orlando	L 102–100	Hamilton (21)	Wallace (15)	Billups (5)	Amway Arena; 17,519	29–13
43	January 23	@ Philadelphia	W 86–78	Hamilton (21)	McDyess (8)	Wallace (6)	Wachovia Center; 13,878	30–13
44	January 25	Orlando	W 101–93	Hamilton (32)	McDyess (13)	Hamilton, Prince (8)	The Palace of Auburn Hills; 22,076	31–13
45	January 29	@ Indiana	W 110–104	Wallace (24)	McDyess (13)	Billups (8)	Conseco Fieldhouse; 12,572	32–13
46	January 31	LA Lakers	W 90–89	Prince (22)	McDyess (12)	Billups (7)	The Palace of Auburn Hills; 22,076	33–13

February: 9–3 (home: 6–1; road: 3–2)

Game	Date	Team	Score	High points	High rebounds	High assists	Location Attendance	Record
47	February 3	Dallas	W 90–67	Wallace (21)	McDyess (11)	Hamilton (7)	The Palace of Auburn Hills; 22,076	34–13
48	February 6	Miami	W 100–95	Wallace (26)	McDyess (13)	Billups (10)	The Palace of Auburn Hills; 22,076	35–13
49	February 8	Portland	W 91–82	Billups (17)	Johnson, Prince, Wallace (6)	Billups (5)	The Palace of Auburn Hills; 22,076	36–13
50	February 10	Charlotte	W 113–87	Prince (21)	McDyess (12)	Billups (7)	The Palace of Auburn Hills; 22,076	37–13
51	February 12	@ Atlanta	W 94–90	Wallace (21)	McDyess (6)	Billups (8)	Philips Arena; 18,227	38–13
52	February 13	Indiana	W 96–80	Billups, Hamilton, Prince (14)	Maxiell (14)	Billups (6)	The Palace of Auburn Hills; 22,076	39–13
53	February 19	Orlando	L 103–85	Stuckey (16)	McDyess (14)	Billups (5)	The Palace of Auburn Hills; 22,076	39–14
54	February 20	@ Milwaukee	L 103–98	Billups (34)	McDyess (14)	Billups, Prince (6)	Bradley Center; 14,211	39–15
55	February 22	Milwaukee	W 127–100	Billups (21)	McDyess (7)	Billups (12)	The Palace of Auburn Hills; 22,076	40–15
56	February 24	@ Phoenix	W 116–86	Wallace (22)	McDyess (13)	Billups (11)	US Airways Center; 18,422	41–15
57	February 25	@ Denver	W 98–93	Billups, Hamilton, Prince (20)	McDyess (13)	Prince (9)	Pepsi Center; 17,901	42–15
58	February 27	@ Utah	L 103–95	Hamilton (22)	McDyess (10)	Billups, Prince (4)	EnergySolutions Arena; 19,911	42–16

March: 10–5 (home: 8–1; road: 2–4)

Game	Date	Team	Score	High points	High rebounds	High assists	Location Attendance	Record
59	March 1	@ LA Clippers	W 103–73	Prince (22)	Maxiell (8)	Prince (10)	Staples Center; 19,271	43–16
60	March 4	Seattle	W 100–97	Prince (24)	Maxiell (9)	Billups (9)	The Palace of Auburn Hills; 22,076	44–16
61	March 5	@ Boston	L 90–78	Billups, Wallace (23)	Prince (10)	Billups (7)	TD Banknorth Garden; 18,624	44–17
62	March 7	@ New York	W 101–97	Prince (28)	Prince (7)	Billups (5)	Madison Square Garden; 19,763	45–17
63	March 9	Chicago	W 116–109	Billups (34)	McDyess (10)	Hamilton (7)	The Palace of Auburn Hills; 22,076	46–17
64	March 12	Philadelphia	L 83–82	Wallace (17)	McDyess (11)	Hamilton (4)	The Palace of Auburn Hills; 22,076	46–18
65	March 14	San Antonio	W 84–80	Hamilton (25)	McDyess (17)	Billups (8)	The Palace of Auburn Hills; 22,076	47–18
66	March 16	New Orleans	W 105–84	Hayes (29)	McDyess (11)	Hamilton (6)	The Palace of Auburn Hills; 22,076	48–18
67	March 18	Denver	W 136–120	Hamilton (24)	Maxiell, McDyess (7)	Billups (10)	The Palace of Auburn Hills; 22,076	49–18
68	March 19	@ Cleveland	L 89–73	Wallace (16)	McDyess (11)	Hamilton (7)	Quicken Loans Arena; 20,562	49–19
69	March 23	@ Washington	L 95–83	Hamilton (19)	McDyess (14)	Billups (11)	Verizon Center; 20,173	49–20
70	March 24	Phoenix	W 110–105	Billups (32)	Wallace (9)	Billups (6)	The Palace of Auburn Hills; 22,076	50–20
71	March 26	@ Toronto	L 89–82	Billups (24)	Prince (8)	Billups (9)	Air Canada Centre; 19,800	50–21
72	March 27	Miami	W 85–69	Afflalo, Maxiell (15)	Prince (8)	Billups (11)	The Palace of Auburn Hills; 22,076	51–21
73	March 29	Cleveland	W 85–71	Hamilton (14)	McDyess (10)	Prince (5)	The Palace of Auburn Hills; 22,076	52–21

April: 7–2 (home: 4–1; road: 3–1)

Game	Date	Team	Score	High points	High rebounds	High assists	Location Attendance	Record
74	April 1	@ Minnesota	W 94–90	Stuckey (27)	McDyess (10)	Prince (6)	Target Center; 15,119	53–21
75	April 4	New Jersey	W 106–87	McDyess (19)	Wallace (8)	Stuckey (9)	The Palace of Auburn Hills; 22,076	54–21
76	April 6	@ Miami	W 91–75	Stuckey (19)	Johnson, Maxiell (7)	Billups (6)	American Airlines Arena; 19,141	55–21
77	April 8	New York	L 98–94	Johnson (14)	Maxiell (10)	Billups, Stuckey (3)	The Palace of Auburn Hills; 22,076	55–22
78	April 9	@ Philadelphia	L 101–94	Billups (18)	Johnson (7)	Stuckey (6)	Wachovia Center; 18,945	55–23
79	April 11	Washington	W 102–74	Maxiell (28)	Wallace (9)	Hamilton (10)	The Palace of Auburn Hills; 22,076	56–23
80	April 13	Toronto	W 91–84	Stuckey (18)	McDyess (9)	Billups (4)	The Palace of Auburn Hills; 22,076	57–23
81	April 15	Minnesota	W 115–103	Hayes (20)	Prince (7)	Billups (6)	The Palace of Auburn Hills; 22,076	58–23
82	April 16	@ Cleveland	W 84–74	Afflalo (15)	Afflalo, Johnson (8)	Dixon (9)	Quicken Loans Arena; 20,562	59–23

2007–08 season schedule

== Playoffs ==
2008 playoff game log
First Round: 4–2 (home: 2–1; road: 2–1)

Game	Date	Team	Score	High points	High rebounds	High assists	Location Attendance	Series
1	April 20	Philadelphia	L 86–90	Wallace (24)	Maxiell (11)	Billups, Hamilton (4)	The Palace of Auburn Hills; 22,076	0–1
2	April 23	Philadelphia	W 105–88	Hamilton (20)	McDyess (12)	Hamilton (7)	The Palace of Auburn Hills; 22,076	1–1
3	April 25	@ Philadelphia	L 75–95	Hamilton (23)	Hamilton (6)	Stuckey (5)	Wachovia Center; 18,805	1–2
4	April 27	@ Philadelphia	W 93–84	Prince (23)	Wallace (10)	Billups, Hamilton (7)	Wachovia Center; 18,347	2–2
5	April 29	Philadelphia	W 98–81	Billups (21)	Maxiell (11)	Billups (12)	The Palace of Auburn Hills; 22,076	3–2
6	May 1	@ Philadelphia	W 100–77	Hamilton (24)	Billups (7)	Prince (7)	Wachovia Center; 14,130	4–2

Conference Semifinals: 4–1 (home: 3–0; road: 1–1)

Game	Date	Team	Score	High points	High rebounds	High assists	Location Attendance	Series
1	May 3	Orlando	W 91–72	Billups (19)	Maxiell (9)	Billups (7)	The Palace of Auburn Hills; 22,076	1–0
2	May 5	Orlando	W 100–93	Billups (28)	Prince (10)	Prince (5)	The Palace of Auburn Hills; 22,076	2–0
3	May 7	@ Orlando	L 86–111	Hamilton (24)	Prince (7)	Hamilton, Prince (3)	Amway Arena; 17,519	2–1
4	May 10	@ Orlando	W 90–89	Hamilton (32)	McDyess (14)	Prince (5)	Amway Arena; 17,519	3–1
5	May 13	Orlando	W 91–86	Hamilton (31)	McDyess (11)	Stuckey (6)	The Palace of Auburn Hills; 22,076	4–1

Conference Finals: 2–4 (home: 1–2; road: 1–2)

Game	Date	Team	Score	High points	High rebounds	High assists	Location Attendance	Series
1	May 20	@ Boston	L 79–88	Prince (16)	McDyess (11)	Wallace (4)	TD Banknorth Garden; 18,624	0–1
2	May 22	@ Boston	W 103–97	Hamilton (25)	Wallace (10)	Billups (7)	TD Banknorth Garden; 18,624	1–1
3	May 24	Boston	L 80–94	Hamilton (26)	McDyess, Wallace (8)	Billups, Stuckey (4)	The Palace of Auburn Hills; 22,076	1–2
4	May 26	Boston	W 94–75	McDyess (21)	McDyess (17)	Hamilton (7)	The Palace of Auburn Hills; 22,076	2–2
5	May 28	@ Boston	L 102–106	Billups (26)	Billups, McDyess (5)	Billups, Hamilton (6)	TD Banknorth Garden; 18,624	2–3
6	May 30	Boston	L 81–89	Billups (29)	Wallace (10)	Billups (6)	The Palace of Auburn Hills; 22,076	2–4

2008 playoff schedule

== Awards and records ==
=== Awards ===
Chauncey Billups was awarded the John Walter Kennedy Citizenship Award for taking much part in NBA Cares and other charity foundations.

=== Records ===
On May 13, 2008, Richard Hamilton surpassed Isiah Thomas as the all-time Piston leading scorer in the playoffs. Hamilton broke Thomas' record of 2,261 points and did it in 110 games — one fewer than Thomas needed to set the mark.

=== Milestones ===
Chauncey Billups recorded his 10,000th career point November 14, 2007 against the Portland Trail Blazers.

== Player stats ==
Legend
GP	Games played	GS	Games started	MPG	Minutes per game
FG%	Field-goal percentage	3P%	3-point field-goal percentage	FT%	Free-throw percentage
RPG	Rebounds per game	APG	Assists per game	SPG	Steals per game
BPG	Blocks per game	PPG	Points per game

=== Regular season ===
Player	GP	GS	MPG	FG%	3P%	FT%	RPG	APG	SPG	BPG	PPG
Arron Afflalo	75	9	12.9	.411	.208	.782	1.8	0.7	0.41	0.11	3.7
Chauncey Billups	78	78	32.3	.448	.401	.918	2.7	6.8	1.29	0.22	17.0
Primož Brezec *	17	0	5.8	.769	–	.500	1.1	0.2	0.12	0.12	1.6
Juan Dixon *	17	0	14.4	.480	.394	.429	1.6	1.9	0.00	0.00	6.5
Ronald Dupree *	1	0	3.0	–	–	–	0.0	0.0	0.00	0.00	0.0
Richard Hamilton	72	72	33.7	.484	.440	.833	3.3	4.2	1.01	0.14	17.3
Jarvis Hayes	82	1	15.7	.431	.376	.750	2.2	0.8	0.57	0.07	6.7
Wálter Herrmann *	28	0	7.1	.392	.289	.800	1.3	0.5	0.11	0.04	3.0
Lindsey Hunter	24	0	9.0	.344	.269	.778	0.5	1.4	0.54	0.08	2.4
Amir Johnson	62	0	12.3	.558	–	.673	3.8	0.5	0.39	1.32	3.6
Jason Maxiell	82	7	21.6	.538	.000	.633	5.3	0.6	0.26	1.15	7.9
Antonio McDyess	78	78	29.3	.488	.000	.622	8.5	1.1	0.78	0.68	8.8
Nazr Mohammed *	21	0	7.1	.475	.000	.433	3.5	0.3	0.33	0.38	3.3
Ronald Murray *	19	2	18.2	.410	.222	.595	1.9	3.4	0.68	0.05	7.5
Tayshaun Prince	82	82	32.9	.448	.363	.768	4.9	3.3	0.51	0.40	13.2
Theo Ratliff *	16	3	13.9	.450	–	.667	3.1	0.4	0.25	1.13	3.0
Cheikh Samb	4	0	7.8	.750	–	.500	1.8	0.0	0.25	0.50	1.8
Rodney Stuckey	57	2	19.0	.401	.188	.814	2.3	2.8	0.86	0.11	7.6
Rasheed Wallace	77	76	30.5	.432	.356	.767	6.6	1.8	1.18	1.68	12.7

* Statistics include only games with Pistons

=== Playoffs ===
Player	GP	GS	MPG	FG%	3P%	FT%	RPG	APG	SPG	BPG	PPG
Arron Afflalo	12	0	7.3	.389	.000	–	0.4	0.5	0.33	0.00	1.2
Chauncey Billups	15	15	31.9	.401	.375	.832	2.9	5.5	0.80	0.07	16.1
Juan Dixon	2	0	3.5	.000	–	–	0.0	0.0	0.00	0.00	0.0
Richard Hamilton	17	17	38.5	.470	.308	.911	4.2	3.9	1.35	0.53	21.6
Jarvis Hayes	11	0	5.5	.300	.357	–	1.5	0.4	0.09	0.18	2.1
Wálter Herrmann	4	0	6.8	.250	1.000	.500	0.3	0.0	0.00	0.00	1.3
Lindsey Hunter	11	0	10.5	.381	.455	–	0.9	1.3	0.73	0.00	1.9
Amir Johnson	8	0	5.4	.750	.000	.500	1.6	0.1	0.00	0.38	2.6
Jason Maxiell	17	6	21.8	.625	–	.469	4.0	0.9	0.88	1.29	5.6
Antonio McDyess	17	11	27.5	.538	–	.821	7.4	0.9	0.59	0.47	8.9
Tayshaun Prince	17	17	39.5	.481	.320	.794	5.5	3.2	0.82	0.47	13.8
Theo Ratliff	12	0	10.9	.500	–	.500	2.3	0.1	0.08	0.92	1.3
Rodney Stuckey	17	2	22.3	.371	.286	.879	1.9	3.4	1.06	0.12	8.2
Rasheed Wallace	17	17	34.4	.424	.320	.744	6.4	1.6	1.12	1.94	13.2

== Transactions ==
The Pistons have been involved in the following transactions during the 2007–08 season.

=== Trades ===
June 15, 2007	To Detroit Pistons 2nd round picks in the 2009 NBA draft and 2011 NBA draft	To Toronto Raptors Carlos Delfino
December 14, 2007	To Detroit Pistons Primož Brezec and Wálter Herrmann	To Charlotte Bobcats Nazr Mohammed
February 21, 2008	To Detroit Pistons Juan Dixon	To Toronto Raptors Primož Brezec

=== Free agents ===
Player / Former team; Jarvis Hayes / Washington Wizards	Player / New team

== See also ==
- 2007–08 NBA season
