= Bill Peterson (basketball) =

American basketball coach (born 1957)

Baylor Bears
- Position: Director of Basketball Operations
- League: Big 12 Conference

Personal information
- Born: April 26, 1957 (age 69)

Career information
- College: Eckerd

Career history

Coaching
- 1980–1983: Louisiana Tech (GA)
- 1983–1987: Union (KY)
- 1987–1994: McNeese State (assistant)
- 1994–1997: Alabama–Huntsville
- 1998–2000: Dallas Mavericks (Player Development)
- 2000–2007: Colorado State (Associate HC)
- 2007–2013: Milwaukee Bucks (assistant)
- 2014–2017: Erie BayHawks
- 2017–2024: Baylor (DBO, SAHC)
- 2024-present: Denver Pioneers

Bill Peterson (born April 26, 1957) is the lead assistant coach for the University of Denver.

Prior to his time at DU he served as the special assistant to the head coach at Baylor University

He previously served as head coach of the Erie BayHawks the NBA Development League of the Orlando Magic and as assistant coach for the Milwaukee Bucks. He served as a player development coach and scout for the NBA's Dallas Mavericks from 1998- 2000 and as a special assistant with the NBA's Golden State Warriors.

== College career ==
Bill Peterson served in various coaching positions. He was head coach at the University of Alabama-Huntsville (1994–1997) and Union (KY) College (1983–1987), He worked as the assistant head coach at McNeese State from 1987 to 1994 and at Bossier Parish Community College (LA) from 1997 to 1999. Peterson began coaching in 1978–79 as a student assistant at St. Petersburg (FL) Junior College and went on to serve as a graduate assistant at Louisiana Tech.

Prior to accepting the position with Baylor in 2017, his last collegiate position was as the associate head coach for the Colorado State Rams.

== Erie BayHawks ==
On August 26, 2014, the Orlando Magic named Peterson the head coach for Erie BayHawks of the NBA Development League.
