= 2007–08 NBA season =

62nd NBA season

- League: National Basketball Association
- Sport: Basketball
- Duration: October 30, 2007 – April 16, 2008; April 19 – May 30, 2008 (Playoffs); June 5 – 17, 2008 (Finals)
- Games: 82
- Teams: 30
- TV partner(s): ABC, TNT, ESPN, NBA TV

Draft
- Top draft pick: Greg Oden
- Picked by: Portland Trail Blazers

Regular season
- Top seed: Boston Celtics
- Season MVP: Kobe Bryant (L.A. Lakers)
- Top scorer: LeBron James (Cleveland)

Playoffs
- Eastern champions: Boston Celtics
- Eastern runners-up: Detroit Pistons
- Western champions: Los Angeles Lakers
- Western runners-up: San Antonio Spurs

Finals
- Champions: Boston Celtics
- Runners-up: Los Angeles Lakers
- Finals MVP: Paul Pierce (Boston)

NBA seasons
- ← 2006–07 2008–09 →

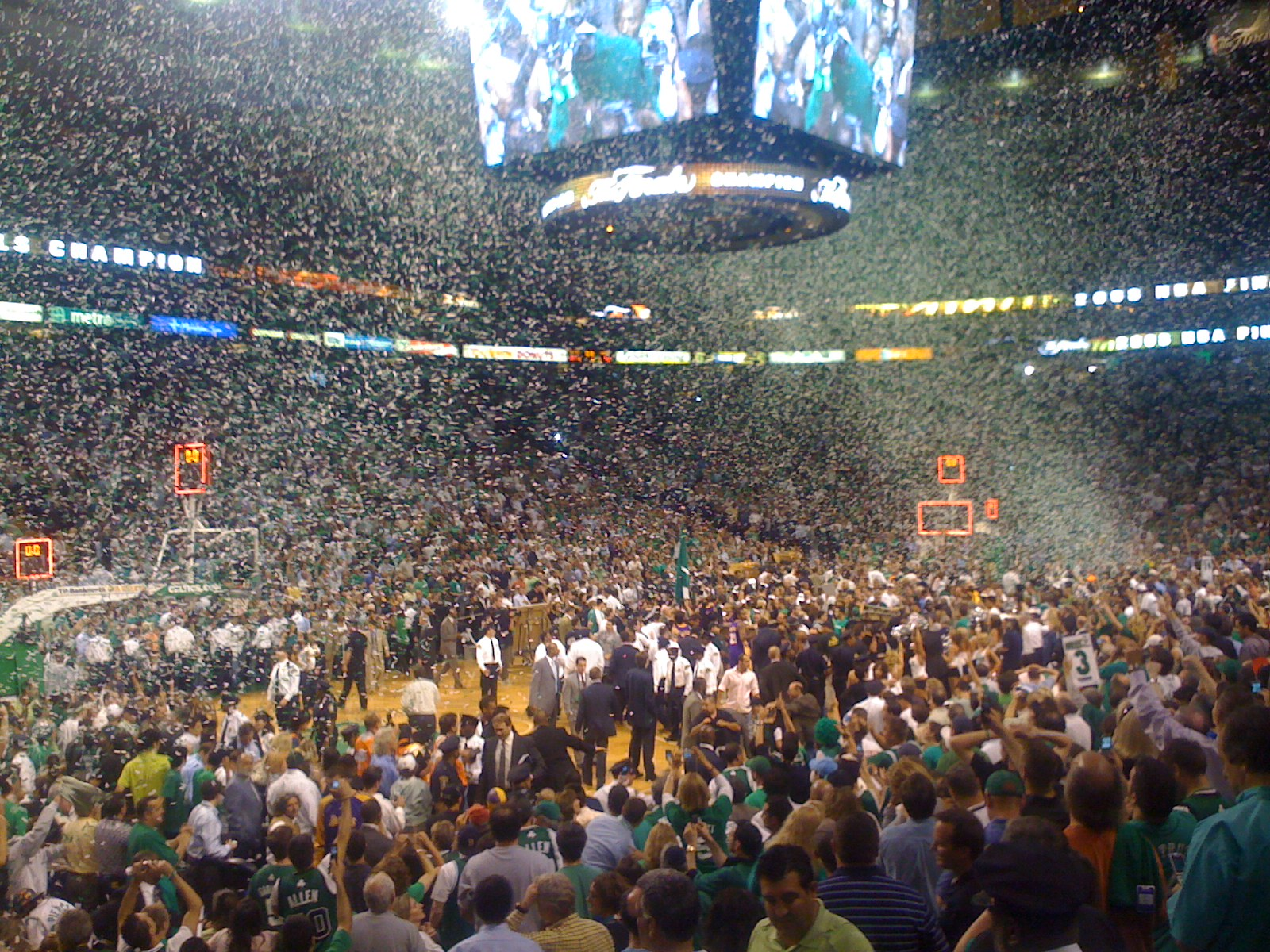
The Final Game

The 2007–08 NBA season was the 62nd season of the National Basketball Association (NBA). The Boston Celtics defeated the Los Angeles Lakers 131–92 to win the 2008 NBA Finals, four games to two. The 2007 NBA draft was held on June 28, 2007, and Greg Oden was selected first overall by the Portland Trail Blazers. However, he missed the entire season due to right knee surgery.

This season was notable for being one of the most competitive Western Conference playoff races in NBA history. Up until April 4, 2008, not a single Western Conference team had secured a playoff spot, and the eighth-seeded team was a mere 6.5 games behind the first seed. Additionally, the quality of the teams ensured that the Golden State Warriors finished with the highest winning percentage of any non-playoff team in NBA history since the switch to the eight-team playoff format, beating out the 2000–01 Houston Rockets. This was later tied by the 2013–14 Phoenix Suns. The all-time record is held by the 1971–72 Phoenix Suns (49–33), which was during the four-team playoff era.

== Notable occurrences ==
- The 2008 NBA All-Star Game was played at the New Orleans Arena, home of the New Orleans Hornets, on February 17, 2008, with the East winning 134–128 and Cleveland's LeBron James being named the MVP. Every single All-Star Game participant would end up in the NBA playoffs, with the exception of Brandon Roy of the Portland Trail Blazers and Dwyane Wade of the Miami Heat.
- The Hornets returned to New Orleans, Louisiana full-time, after splitting home games during the previous two seasons with New Orleans and Oklahoma City due to damage caused by Hurricane Katrina.
- The NBA extended its eight-year television contract with Time Warner's TNT and The Walt Disney Company's ABC and ESPN through 2016.
- Sacramento Kings small forward Ron Artest and Golden State Warriors shooting guard Stephen Jackson were suspended for the first seven games of the season.
- The Orlando Magic got approvals in the last week of July for a new arena, which was ready for the 2010–11 season.
- After spending 12 seasons with the Minnesota Timberwolves, Kevin Garnett was traded to the Boston Celtics in exchange for seven players, the largest trade in NBA history for one player.
- On November 2, 2007, the Seattle SuperSonics made their plans to move to Oklahoma City official.
- On December 23, 2007, Kobe Bryant became the youngest player to score 20,000 points at age 29 years, 122 days old, surpassing Wilt Chamberlain's previous record of 29 years, 134 days old.
- On December 24, 2007, the Chicago Bulls fired head coach Scott Skiles after a 9–16 start. Jim Boylan was named the interim head coach for the remaining games in the season three days later.
- On January 11, 2008, NBA commissioner David Stern granted the Miami Heat a 51.9-second replay on their overtime game on December 19, 2007, versus the Atlanta Hawks because the official scorer ruled incorrectly that Shaquille O'Neal was fouled out, when he was on his fifth foul. The Hawks were fined $50,000 for their "gross negligence". The replay was held on March 8, 2008, before the teams' next meeting. This was the first replay since December 1982 when then-NBA commissioner Larry O'Brien granted a replay on a double-overtime game between the San Antonio Spurs and the Los Angeles Lakers. This replay was continued despite O'Neal having been traded to the Phoenix Suns. The Hawks went on to win the replay.
- February 2008 was marked by several major trades by some of the league's top teams. Some of the more notable trades include:
  - Pau Gasol going from the Memphis Grizzlies to the Los Angeles Lakers for Kwame Brown, Javaris Crittenton, Aaron McKie, draft rights to his brother Marc Gasol, and two first-round draft picks in 2008 and 2010.
  - Shaquille O'Neal going from the Miami Heat to the Phoenix Suns in return for Shawn Marion and Marcus Banks.
  - Mike Bibby going from the Sacramento Kings to the Atlanta Hawks in exchange for Anthony Johnson, Tyronn Lue, Shelden Williams, Lorenzen Wright and a 2008 second-round draft pick.
  - Jason Kidd, along with Malik Allen and Antoine Wright going from the New Jersey Nets to the Dallas Mavericks in exchange for Devin Harris, DeSagana Diop, Maurice Ager, Trenton Hassell, retired Keith Van Horn, two first-round draft picks and $3 million.
  - Kurt Thomas going from the Seattle SuperSonics to the San Antonio Spurs in exchange for Brent Barry, Francisco Elson and a 2009 first-round draft pick. Barry was immediately waived by the Sonics, and later re-signed by the Spurs.
  - A three-team deal between Cleveland, Chicago and Seattle that saw Ben Wallace and Joe Smith, a 2009 second-round pick, Sonics forward Wally Szczerbiak and guard Delonte West all go to Cleveland, Cavs forwards Drew Gooden and Cedric Simmons, guards Larry Hughes and Shannon Brown go to Chicago, Cavs forwards Ira Newble and Donyell Marshall, and Bulls forward Adrian Griffin go to Seattle.
  - Bonzi Wells and Mike James going from the Houston Rockets to the New Orleans Hornets for point guard Bobby Jackson.
- On February 28, 2008, Cleveland Cavaliers' LeBron James became the youngest player to score 10,000 points at age 23 years and 59 days old, surpassing Kobe Bryant's previous record of 24 years and 193 days old.
- From January 29, 2008, to March 18, 2008, the Houston Rockets won 22 consecutive games, notching the fourth-longest winning streak in NBA history.
- The Boston Celtics broke the record for the best single-season turnaround in NBA history by improving from 24 wins in 2006–07 to 66 wins this season, a total of 42 games. The previous record of 36 games was held by the 1997–98 San Antonio Spurs, who improved from 20 to 56 wins.
- The Atlanta Hawks made the playoffs for the first time since 1999, ending the league's longest playoff drought.
- The Golden State Warriors missed the playoffs despite finishing the regular season with a 48–34 record.
- On April 28, 2008, Pat Riley announced that he would step down as the Miami Heat head coach after leading the team to a 15–67 record. Former Heat assistant coach Erik Spoelstra was announced as his replacement. Riley remained as team president.
- The New Orleans Hornets (as of 2013, the Pelicans) won their team's first playoff series in franchise history defeating the Dallas Mavericks 4–1. They lost a seven-game series to the San Antonio Spurs in the conference semifinals.
- After losing in the first round of the playoffs, Dallas Mavericks coach Avery Johnson was fired as head coach. Former Pacers coach Rick Carlisle was named as Johnson's replacement.
- Mike D'Antoni agreed to a four-year, $24 million contract with the New York Knicks. The team D'Antoni left, the Phoenix Suns, replaced him with Terry Porter.
- The 2008 NBA Finals featured No. 1 seeds from both conferences for the first time since 2000. The Boston Celtics, who earned their first finals appearance since 1987, faced the Los Angeles Lakers, reviving a classic rivalry not seen since the Lakers beat the Celtics 4–2 in 1987. This time the Celtics prevailed 4–2 over the Lakers.
- Flip Saunders was dismissed as Detroit Pistons head coach, four days after the Celtics beat the Pistons in the Eastern Conference Finals. Detroit's game 4 win over Boston marked the last and most recent playoff win as of 2021 for the Motor City as they began to rebuild for the next several years—longtime Pistons guard Chauncey Billups was traded to the Denver Nuggets for Allen Iverson after the first few games in the 2008–09 season, and several players were signed and traded away, which marked the end of the mid-2000s Pistons era.
- On June 17, 2008, after a rough 26-game playoff journey, the Boston Celtics won their record 17th NBA championship with a six-game NBA Finals triumph over the Los Angeles Lakers.
- Beginning with this season, all NBA broadcasts on ESPN, ABC and TNT include interviews with the head coaches by the courtside reporter prior to the second and fourth quarter of games. The visiting team's coach is interviewed before the second, the host team's coach is interviewed before the fourth quarter.

=== Coaching changes ===
Offseason
Team	2006–07 coach	2007–08 coach
Charlotte Bobcats	Bernie Bickerstaff	Sam Vincent
Houston Rockets	Jeff Van Gundy	Rick Adelman
Indiana Pacers	Rick Carlisle	Jim O'Brien
Memphis Grizzlies	Tony Barone	Marc Iavaroni
Orlando Magic	Brian Hill	Stan Van Gundy
Sacramento Kings	Eric Musselman	Reggie Theus
Seattle SuperSonics	Bob Hill	P. J. Carlesimo
In-season
Team	Outgoing coach	Incoming coach
Chicago Bulls	Scott Skiles	Pete Myers
Chicago Bulls	Pete Myers	Jim Boylan

== 2007–08 logo and uniform changes ==
- Atlanta Hawks – added new logo and new uniforms, replacing red, black, yellow and gold colors with remained red, and added dark navy blue, grey and silver to their color scheme, and side panels to their jerseys and shorts.
- Charlotte Bobcats – added new grey road alternate uniforms, and added pinstripes with checkered flag of black-and-white "NASCAR version" side panels to their jerseys and shorts.
- Philadelphia 76ers – slightly changed their uniforms by adding side panels to their jerseys and shorts, and added new red road alternate uniforms with blue side panels to their jerseys and shorts.
- Washington Wizards – slightly changed their logo and uniforms by replacing dark brown with lighter brown to their color scheme, and added side panels to their jerseys and shorts.

== Final standings ==
=== By division ===
Eastern Conference

Atlantic Division	W	L	PCT	GB	Home	Road	Div
z-Boston Celtics	66	16	.805	–	35–6	31–10	14–2
x-Toronto Raptors	41	41	.500	25	25–16	16–25	10–6
x-Philadelphia 76ers	40	42	.488	26	22–19	18–23	7–9
New Jersey Nets	34	48	.415	32	21–20	13–28	4–12
New York Knicks	23	59	.280	43	15–26	8–33	5–11

Central Division	W	L	PCT	GB	Home	Road	Div
y-Detroit Pistons	59	23	.732	–	34–7	25–16	11–5
x-Cleveland Cavaliers	45	37	.549	14	27–14	18–23	7–9
Indiana Pacers	36	46	.439	23	21–20	15–26	5–11
Chicago Bulls	33	49	.402	26	20–21	13–28	11–5
Milwaukee Bucks	26	56	.317	33	19–22	7–34	6–10

Southeast Division	W	L	PCT	GB	Home	Road	Div
y-Orlando Magic	52	30	.634	–	25–16	27–14	12–4
x-Washington Wizards	43	39	.500	9	25–16	18–23	10–6
x-Atlanta Hawks	37	45	.451	15	25–16	12–29	9–7
Charlotte Bobcats	32	50	.390	20	21–20	11–30	7–9
Miami Heat	15	67	.183	37	9–32	6–35	2–14

Western Conference

Northwest Division	W	L	PCT	GB	Home	Road	Div
y-Utah Jazz	54	28	.659	–	37–4	17–24	13–3
x-Denver Nuggets	50	32	.610	4	33–8	17–24	10–6
Portland Trail Blazers	41	41	.500	13	28–13	13–28	10–6
Minnesota Timberwolves	22	60	.268	32	15–26	7–34	3–13
Seattle SuperSonics	20	62	.244	34	13–28	7–34	6–10

Pacific Division	W	L	PCT	GB	Home	Road	Div
c-Los Angeles Lakers	57	25	.695	–	30–11	27–14	12–4
x-Phoenix Suns	55	27	.671	2	30–11	25–16	10–6
Golden State Warriors	48	34	.585	9	27–14	21–20	10–6
Sacramento Kings	38	44	.463	19	26–15	12–29	3–13
Los Angeles Clippers	23	59	.284	34	13–28	10–31	5–11

Southwest Division	W	L	PCT	GB	Home	Road	Div
y-New Orleans Hornets	56	26	.683	–	30–11	26–15	10–6
x-San Antonio Spurs	56	26	.683	–	34–7	22–19	10–6
x-Houston Rockets	55	27	.671	1	31–10	24–17	8–8
x-Dallas Mavericks	51	31	.622	5	34–7	17–24	10–6
Memphis Grizzlies	22	60	.268	34	14–27	8–33	2–14

=== By conference ===
Eastern Conference
#	Team	W	L	PCT	GB
1	z-Boston Celtics	66	16	.805	–
2	y-Detroit Pistons	59	23	.732	7
3	y-Orlando Magic	52	30	.634	14
4	x-Cleveland Cavaliers	45	37	.549	21
5	x-Washington Wizards	43	39	.524	23
6	x-Toronto Raptors	41	41	.500	25
7	x-Philadelphia 76ers	40	42	.488	26
8	x-Atlanta Hawks	37	45	.451	29
9	Indiana Pacers	36	46	.439	30
10	New Jersey Nets	34	48	.415	32
11	Chicago Bulls	33	49	.402	33
12	Charlotte Bobcats	32	50	.390	34
13	Milwaukee Bucks	26	56	.317	40
14	New York Knicks	23	59	.280	43
15	Miami Heat	15	67	.183	51

#	Western Conference				
#	Team	W	L	PCT	GB
1	c-Los Angeles Lakers	57	25	.695	–
2	y-New Orleans Hornets	56	26	.683	1
3	x-San Antonio Spurs	56	26	.683	1
4	y-Utah Jazz	54	28	.659	3
5	x-Houston Rockets	55	27	.671	2
6	x-Phoenix Suns	55	27	.671	2
7	x-Dallas Mavericks	51	31	.622	6
8	x-Denver Nuggets	50	32	.610	7
9	Golden State Warriors	48	34	.585	9
10	Portland Trail Blazers	41	41	.500	16
11	Sacramento Kings	38	44	.463	19
12	Los Angeles Clippers	23	59	.280	34
13	Minnesota Timberwolves	22	60	.268	35
14	Memphis Grizzlies	22	60	.268	35
15	Seattle SuperSonics	20	62	.244	37

Notes

- z – Clinched home court advantage for the entire playoffs
- c – Clinched home court advantage for the conference playoffs
- x – Clinched playoff spot
- y – Clinched division title

== Playoffs ==
Teams in bold advanced to the next round. The numbers to the left of each team indicate the team's seeding in its conference, and the numbers to the right indicate the number of games the team won in that round. The division champions are marked by an asterisk. Home-court advantage does not necessarily belong to the higher-seeded team, but instead the team with the better regular season record; teams enjoying the home advantage are shown in italics.

First Round	Conference Semifinals
**E1**	**Boston***	**4**
E8	Atlanta	3
**E1**	**Boston***	**4**
E4	Cleveland	3
**E4**	**Cleveland**	**4**
E5	Washington	2
**Eastern Conference**
**E3**	**Orlando***	**4**
E6	Toronto	1
E3	Orlando*	1
**E2**	**Detroit***	**4**
**E2**	**Detroit***	**4**
E7	Philadelphia	2
**W1**	**LA Lakers***	**4**
W8	Denver	0
**W1**	**LA Lakers***	**4**
W4	Utah*	2
**W4**	**Utah***	**4**
W5	Houston	2
**Western Conference**
**W3**	**San Antonio**	**4**
W6	Phoenix	1
**W3**	**San Antonio**	**4**
W2	New Orleans*	3
**W2**	**New Orleans***	**4**
W7	Dallas	1

Conference Finals
**E1**	**Boston***	**4**
E2	Detroit*	2
**W1**	**LA Lakers***	**4**
W3	San Antonio	1

NBA Finals
**E1**	**Boston***	**4**
W1	LA Lakers*	2

- * Division winner
- **Bold** Series winner
- Italic Team with home-court advantage

== Statistics leaders ==
Category	Player	Team	Stat
Points per game	LeBron James	Cleveland Cavaliers	30.0
Rebounds per game	Dwight Howard	Orlando Magic	14.2
Assists per game	Chris Paul	New Orleans Hornets	11.6
Steals per game	Chris Paul	New Orleans Hornets	2.71
Blocks per game	Marcus Camby	Denver Nuggets	3.61
Field goal percentage	Andris Biedriņš	Golden State Warriors	.626
Free throw percentage	Peja Stojaković	New Orleans Hornets	.929
Three-point field goal percentage	Jason Kapono	Toronto Raptors	.483

== NBA awards ==
=== Yearly awards ===
- Most Valuable Player: Kobe Bryant, Los Angeles Lakers
- Rookie of the Year: Kevin Durant, Seattle SuperSonics
- Defensive Player of the Year: Kevin Garnett, Boston Celtics
- Sixth Man of the Year: Manu Ginóbili, San Antonio Spurs
- Most Improved Player: Hedo Türkoğlu, Orlando Magic
- Coach of the Year: Byron Scott, New Orleans Hornets
- Executive of the Year: Danny Ainge, Boston Celtics
- Sportsmanship Award: Grant Hill, Phoenix Suns

- All-NBA First Team:
  - F Kevin Garnett – Boston Celtics
  - F LeBron James – Cleveland Cavaliers
  - C Dwight Howard – Orlando Magic
  - G Kobe Bryant – Los Angeles Lakers
  - G Chris Paul – New Orleans Hornets
- NBA All-Defensive First Team:
  - F Kevin Garnett – Boston Celtics
  - F Tim Duncan – San Antonio Spurs
  - C Marcus Camby – Denver Nuggets
  - G Kobe Bryant – Los Angeles Lakers
  - G Bruce Bowen – San Antonio Spurs
- NBA All-Rookie First Team:
  - Al Horford – Atlanta Hawks
  - Kevin Durant – Seattle SuperSonics
  - Luis Scola – Houston Rockets
  - Al Thornton – Los Angeles Clippers
  - Jeff Green – Seattle SuperSonics
- All-NBA Second Team:
  - F Tim Duncan – San Antonio Spurs
  - F Dirk Nowitzki – Dallas Mavericks
  - C Amar'e Stoudemire – Phoenix Suns
  - G Steve Nash – Phoenix Suns
  - G Deron Williams – Utah Jazz
- NBA All-Defensive Second Team:
  - F Tayshaun Prince – Detroit Pistons
  - F Shane Battier – Houston Rockets
  - C Dwight Howard – Orlando Magic
  - G Raja Bell – Phoenix Suns
  - G Chris Paul – New Orleans Hornets
- NBA All-Rookie Second Team:
  - Jamario Moon – Toronto Raptors
  - Juan Carlos Navarro – Memphis Grizzlies
  - Thaddeus Young – Philadelphia 76ers
  - Rodney Stuckey – Detroit Pistons
  - Carl Landry – Houston Rockets
- All-NBA Third Team:
  - F Carlos Boozer – Utah Jazz
  - F Paul Pierce – Boston Celtics
  - C Yao Ming – Houston Rockets
  - G Tracy McGrady – Houston Rockets
  - G Manu Ginóbili – San Antonio Spurs

=== Players of the week ===
The following players were named the Eastern and Western Conference Players of the Week.

Week	Eastern Conference	Western Conference	Ref.
Oct. 30 – Nov. 4	Danny Granger (Indiana Pacers) (1/1)	Tracy McGrady (Houston Rockets) (1/2)	
Nov. 5 – Nov. 11	Kevin Garnett (Boston Celtics) (1/3)	Yao Ming (Houston Rockets) (1/1)	
Nov. 12 – Nov. 18	Dwight Howard (Orlando Magic) (1/2)	Allen Iverson (Denver Nuggets) (1/3)	
Nov. 19 – Nov. 25	LeBron James (Cleveland Cavaliers) (1/3)	Tony Parker (San Antonio Spurs) (1/1)	
Nov. 26 – Dec. 2	Dwight Howard (Orlando Magic) (2/2)	Stephen Jackson (Golden State Warriors) (1/1)	
Dec. 3 – Dec. 9	Josh Smith (Atlanta Hawks) (1/1)	Brandon Roy (Portland Trail Blazers) (1/2)	
Dec. 10 – Dec. 16	Paul Pierce (Boston Celtics) (1/2)	Brandon Roy (Portland Trail Blazers) (2/2)	
Dec. 17 – Dec. 23	Joe Johnson (Atlanta Hawks) (1/2)	Carmelo Anthony (Denver Nuggets) (1/2)	
Dec. 24 – Dec. 30	Paul Pierce (Boston Celtics) (2/2)	Chris Paul (New Orleans Hornets) (1/2)	
Dec. 31 – Jan. 6	LeBron James (Cleveland Cavaliers) (2/3)	Allen Iverson (Denver Nuggets) (2/3)	
Jan. 7 – Jan. 13	Chris Bosh (Toronto Raptors) (1/1)	Kobe Bryant (Los Angeles Lakers) (1/3)	
Jan. 14 – Jan. 20	Gerald Wallace (Charlotte Bobcats) (1/1)	Baron Davis (Golden State Warriors) (1/1)	
Jan. 21 – Jan. 27	Hedo Türkoğlu (Orlando Magic) (1/2)	Al Jefferson (Minnesota Timberwolves) (1/1)	
Jan. 28 – Feb. 3	Hedo Türkoğlu (Orlando Magic) (2/2)	Brad Miller (Sacramento Kings) (1/1)	
Feb. 4 – Feb. 10	Andre Miller (Philadelphia 76ers) (1/2)	Amar'e Stoudemire (Phoenix Suns) (1/2)	
Feb. 19 – Feb. 24	LeBron James (Cleveland Cavaliers) (3/3)	Manu Ginobili (San Antonio Spurs) (1/1)	
Feb. 25 – Mar. 2	Andre Miller (Philadelphia 76ers) (2/2)	Kobe Bryant (Los Angeles Lakers) (2/3)	
Mar. 3 – Mar. 9	Jason Richardson (Charlotte Bobcats) (1/2)	Tracy McGrady (Houston Rockets) (2/2)	
Mar. 10 – Mar. 16	Antawn Jamison (Washington Wizards) (1/1)	Amar'e Stoudemire (Phoenix Suns) (2/2)	
Mar. 17 – Mar. 23	Kevin Garnett (Boston Celtics) (2/3)	Chris Paul (New Orleans Hornets) (2/2)	
Mar. 24 – Mar. 30	Jason Richardson (Charlotte Bobcats) (2/2)	Carmelo Anthony (Denver Nuggets) (2/2)	
Mar. 31 – Apr. 6	Joe Johnson (Atlanta Hawks) (2/2)	Kobe Bryant (Los Angeles Lakers) (3/3)	
Apr. 7 – Apr. 13	Kevin Garnett (Boston Celtics) (3/3)	Allen Iverson (Denver Nuggets) (3/3)	

=== Players of the month ===
The following players were named the Eastern and Western Conference Players of the Month.

Month	Eastern Conference	Western Conference	Ref.
October – November	Dwight Howard (Orlando Magic) (1/2)	Carlos Boozer (Utah Jazz) (1/1)	
December	Dwight Howard (Orlando Magic) (2/2)	Chris Paul (New Orleans Hornets) (1/2)	
January	LeBron James (Cleveland Cavaliers) (1/2)	Yao Ming (Houston Rockets) (1/1)	
February	LeBron James (Cleveland Cavaliers) (2/2)	Kobe Bryant (Los Angeles Lakers) (1/2)	
March	Joe Johnson (Atlanta Hawks) (1/1)	Chris Paul (New Orleans Hornets) (2/2)	
April	Hedo Türkoğlu (Orlando Magic) (1/1)	Kobe Bryant (Los Angeles Lakers) (2/2)	

=== Rookies of the month ===
The following players were named the Eastern and Western Conference Rookies of the Month.

Month	Eastern Conference	Western Conference	Ref.
October – November	Al Horford (Atlanta Hawks) (1/3)	Kevin Durant (Seattle SuperSonics) (1/5)	
December	Yi Jianlian (Milwaukee Bucks) (1/1)	Kevin Durant (Seattle SuperSonics) (2/5)	
January	Jamario Moon (Toronto Raptors) (1/1)	Kevin Durant (Seattle SuperSonics) (3/5)	
February	Al Horford (Atlanta Hawks) (2/3)	Luis Scola (Houston Rockets) (1/1)	
March	Al Horford (Atlanta Hawks) (3/3)	Kevin Durant (Seattle SuperSonics) (4/5)	
April	Ramon Sessions (Milwaukee Bucks) (1/1)	Kevin Durant (Seattle SuperSonics) (5/5)	

=== Coaches of the month ===
The following coaches were named the Eastern and Western Conference Coaches of the Month.

Month	Eastern Conference	Western Conference	Ref.
October – November	Doc Rivers (Boston Celtics) (1/3)	Gregg Popovich (San Antonio Spurs) (1/1)	
December	Flip Saunders (Detroit Pistons) (1/2)	Nate McMillan (Portland Trail Blazers) (1/1)	
January	Mike Brown (Cleveland Cavaliers) (1/1)	Byron Scott (New Orleans Hornets) (1/1)	
February	Flip Saunders (Detroit Pistons) (2/2)	Rick Adelman (Houston Rockets) (1/1)	
March	Doc Rivers (Boston Celtics) (2/3)	Jerry Sloan (Utah Jazz) (1/1)	
April	Doc Rivers (Boston Celtics) (3/3)	Phil Jackson (Los Angeles Lakers) (1/1)	

== See also ==
- List of NBA regular season records
