= 2008 NBA Finals =

2008 basketball championship series

Team	Coach	Wins
Boston Celtics	Doc Rivers	4
Los Angeles Lakers	Phil Jackson	2
- Dates: June 5–17
- MVP: Paul Pierce (Boston Celtics)
- Hall of Famers: Celtics: Ray Allen (2018); Kevin Garnett (2020); Paul Pierce (2021); Lakers: Kobe Bryant (2020); Pau Gasol (2023); Coaches: Phil Jackson (2007); Doc Rivers (2026); Officials: Dick Bavetta (2015); Danny Crawford (2025); Joey Crawford (2026)
- Eastern finals: Celtics defeated Pistons, 4–2
- Western finals: Lakers defeated Spurs, 4–1

The 2008 NBA Finals was the championship series of the National Basketball Association's (NBA) 2007–08 season and conclusion of the season's playoffs. A best-of-seven playoff series that was played from June 5–17, 2008, the series was contested between the Eastern Conference champion Boston Celtics and the Western Conference champion Los Angeles Lakers. It was the eleventh Finals meeting in the history of the Celtics–Lakers rivalry. The Celtics defeated the Lakers in six games to win their first championship since 1986 and their seventeenth title overall.

Paul Pierce was named the Finals MVP. Rodd Houston narrated the Boston Celtics' championship season documentary on NBA Entertainment. The made-for-TV version of this documentary is narrated by Kevin Harlan.

This NBA Finals would be the Celtics' last title until 2024, when they defeated the Dallas Mavericks in five games.

== Background ==
The Celtics made their first NBA Finals appearance since a six-game loss to the Lakers in 1987. Over the next 20 years the Celtics endured lean years, not making the playoffs in nine of those years. Following the dissolution of the team's original "Big Three" through the retirements of Larry Bird and Kevin McHale and the departure of Robert Parish, the Celtics suffered through several tragedies such as the passing of Reggie Lewis in 1993; a franchise-worst 15-win 1996–97 season; the ill-fated hiring of head coach Rick Pitino; and the deaths of franchise patriarch Red Auerbach and former player Dennis Johnson, which culminated in a 24-win 2006–07 season, highlighted by a franchise-worst 18 straight losses.

Nevertheless, the 2007 off-season saw Celtics general manager Danny Ainge acquire Ray Allen and Kevin Garnett to join franchise star Paul Pierce. This new formation became regarded as the most talented Boston Celtics team since the duo of Antoine Walker and Paul Pierce in the early 2000s. The newly formed 'Big Three,' joined by second year point guard and future all star Rajon Rondo, led the Celtics to a dramatic 42-game turnaround, finishing with 66 wins.

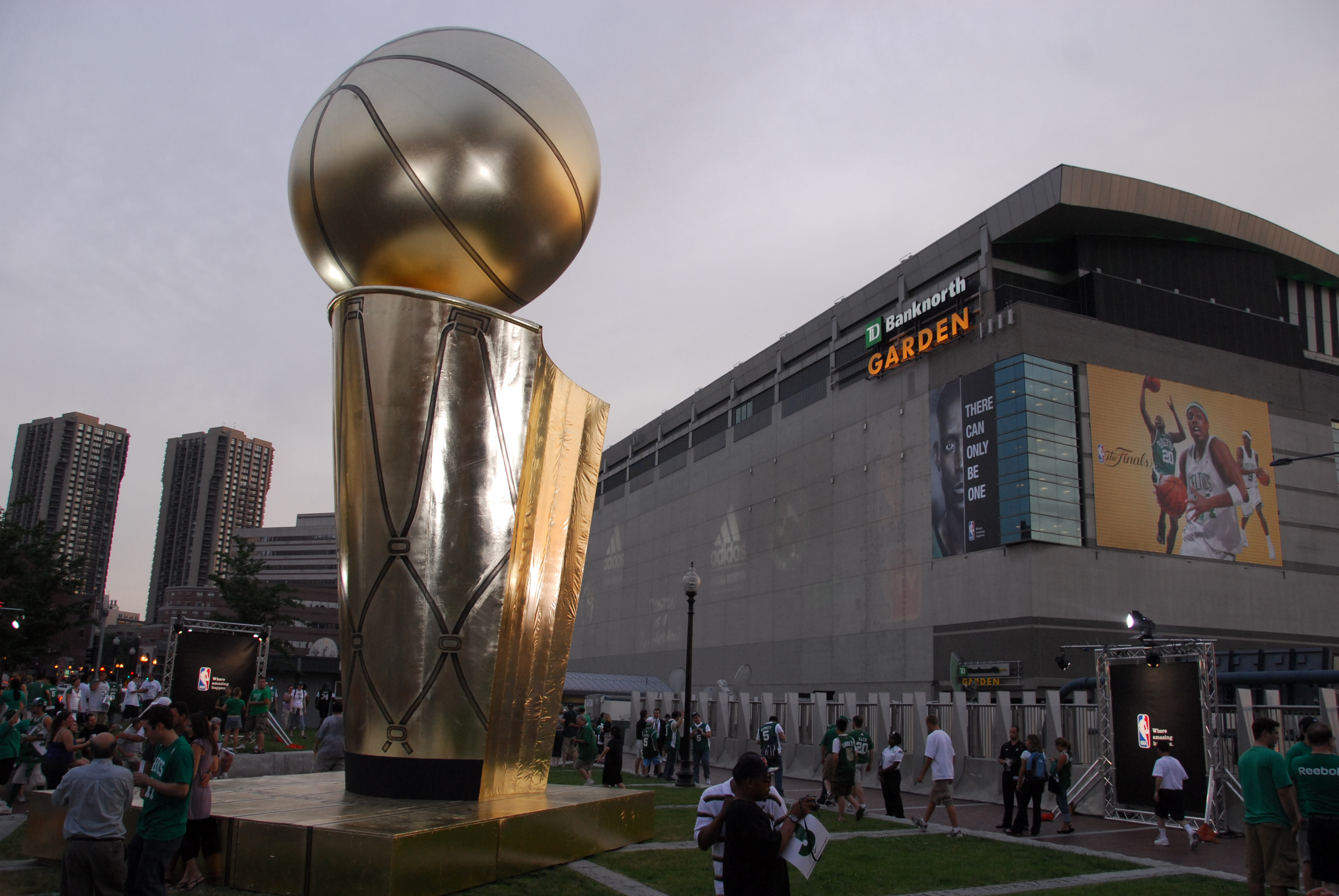
Exterior view of the TD Garden ahead of Game 2 of the 2008 NBA Finals.

In the playoffs, the Celtics were pushed to the brink by the Atlanta Hawks and Cleveland Cavaliers, and despite not winning on the road, managed to prevail in a pair of Game 7s on their home court. The Celtics would finally break their road woes in a six-game win against the perennial Eastern Conference powerhouse Detroit Pistons, earning their first finals berth since 1987.

After losing to the Pistons in the 2004 NBA Finals, despite a talent-laden roster, Phil Jackson abruptly retired. Soon after, the Lakers decided to rebuild by trading away Shaquille O'Neal to the Miami Heat for Lamar Odom, Caron Butler and Brian Grant. The 2004–05 season saw the Lakers miss the playoffs for only the fifth time in team history. Even though he had written a book called The Last Season, going as far as calling Kobe Bryant "uncoachable," Jackson returned to the Lakers for the 2005–06 season. Jackson and Bryant would patch up their differences, but after a pair of first-round exits, Bryant demanded, but later retracted, a trade in the off-season.

The Lakers' 2007–08 season saw the team win 57 games, along the way adding Spanish forward Pau Gasol in mid-season while Andrew Bynum was recovering from a mid-season knee injury. The Lakers eliminated the Denver Nuggets 4–0, then the Utah Jazz 4–2 and then dethroned the erstwhile defending champion San Antonio Spurs 4–1 in the conference finals, making their 29th NBA Finals appearance.

=== 2008 NBA playoffs ===
Los Angeles Lakers (Western Conference champion)		Boston Celtics (Eastern Conference champion)
# / Western Conference; # / Team / W / L / PCT / GB; 1 / c-Los Angeles Lakers / 57 / 25 / .695 / –; 2 / y-New Orleans Hornets / 56 / 26 / .683 / 1; 3 / x-San Antonio Spurs / 56 / 26 / .683 / 1; 4 / y-Utah Jazz / 54 / 28 / .659 / 3; 5 / x-Houston Rockets / 55 / 27 / .671 / 2; 6 / x-Phoenix Suns / 55 / 27 / .671 / 2; 7 / x-Dallas Mavericks / 51 / 31 / .622 / 6; 8 / x-Denver Nuggets / 50 / 32 / .610 / 7; 9 / Golden State Warriors / 48 / 34 / .585 / 9; 10 / Portland Trail Blazers / 41 / 41 / .500 / 16; 11 / Sacramento Kings / 38 / 44 / .463 / 19; 12 / Los Angeles Clippers / 23 / 59 / .280 / 34; 13 / Minnesota Timberwolves / 22 / 60 / .268 / 35; 14 / Memphis Grizzlies / 22 / 60 / .268 / 35; 15 / Seattle SuperSonics / 20 / 62 / .244 / 37; 1st seed in the West, 3rd best league record	Regular season	Eastern Conference: # / Team / W / L / PCT / GB; 1 / z-Boston Celtics / 66 / 16 / .805 / –; 2 / y-Detroit Pistons / 59 / 23 / .732 / 7; 3 / y-Orlando Magic / 52 / 30 / .634 / 14; 4 / x-Cleveland Cavaliers / 45 / 37 / .549 / 21; 5 / x-Washington Wizards / 43 / 39 / .524 / 23; 6 / x-Toronto Raptors / 41 / 41 / .500 / 25; 7 / x-Philadelphia 76ers / 40 / 42 / .488 / 26; 8 / x-Atlanta Hawks / 37 / 45 / .451 / 29; 9 / Indiana Pacers / 36 / 46 / .439 / 30; 10 / New Jersey Nets / 34 / 48 / .415 / 32; 11 / Chicago Bulls / 33 / 49 / .402 / 33; 12 / Charlotte Bobcats / 32 / 50 / .390 / 34; 13 / Milwaukee Bucks / 26 / 56 / .317 / 40; 14 / New York Knicks / 23 / 59 / .280 / 43; 15 / Miami Heat / 15 / 67 / .183 / 51; 1st seed in the East, best league record
Defeated the (8) Denver Nuggets, 4–0	First round	Defeated the (8) Atlanta Hawks, 4–3
Defeated the (4) Utah Jazz, 4–2	Conference semifinals	Defeated the (4) Cleveland Cavaliers, 4–3
Defeated the (3) San Antonio Spurs, 4–1	Conference finals	Defeated the (2) Detroit Pistons, 4–2

=== Regular season series ===
The Boston Celtics won both games in the regular season series:

KCAL, CSN

November 23, 2007

Recap

Los Angeles Lakers 94, Boston Celtics 107

TD Banknorth Garden, Boston

NBA TV

December 30, 2007

Recap

Boston Celtics 110, Los Angeles Lakers 91

Staples Center, Los Angeles

On December 30, 2007, the Celtics routed the Lakers at the Staples Center on throwback jersey night by a score of 110–91. In addition to throwback jerseys, the Lakers also played the first half in throwback shorts, but went back to their regular shorts after halftime with the lopsided score in the Celtics favor. With the win, the Celtics prevented Lakers coach Phil Jackson from surpassing Red Auerbach for seventh all-time in coaching wins. With it being the first time the Celtics Big 3 visited the Lakers as a unit, and it being throwback jersey night, there was a lot of emotion in the building between the histoic rivals; as such, there were seven technical fouls assessed to both teams in the game. The Celtics moved to 26–3, which continued one of their best starts in franchise history.

The game was also a harbinger of things to come in the 2008 Finals. Bryant scored 22 points, but did so inefficiently, going 6-for-25. This would be a theme in the Finals, as Bryant was still able to score 25.7 PPG, but shot just 40 percent from the field. On the other end, Paul Pierce scored 33 points and Kevin Garnett shut down the Lakers' big men, two things that continued in the Finals. A little over one month after this game, the Lakers traded for Memphis Grizzlies star forward Pau Gasol, largely in part to match-up with Garnett.

== Series summary ==
Game	Date	Road team	Result	Home team
Game 1	June 5	Los Angeles Lakers	88–98 (1–0)	**Boston Celtics**
Game 2	June 8	Los Angeles Lakers	102–108 (2–0)	**Boston Celtics**
Game 3	June 10	Boston Celtics	81–87 (2–1)	**Los Angeles Lakers**
Game 4	June 12	**Boston Celtics**	97–91 (3–1)	Los Angeles Lakers
Game 5	June 15	Boston Celtics	98–103 (3–2)	**Los Angeles Lakers**
Game 6	June 17	Los Angeles Lakers	92–131 (2–4)	**Boston Celtics**

Note: team in Bold won the game

== Game summaries ==
All times listed below are Eastern Daylight Time (UTC-4). If the venue is located in a different time zone, the local time is also given.

=== Game 1 ===
ABC, TSN, Cuatro, Canal+, Canal 7

June 5
9:00 pm

Recap
Video highlights on YouTube

Los Angeles Lakers 88, **Boston Celtics** **98**
Scoring by quarter: 21–**23**, **30**–23, 22–**31**, 15–**21**
Pts: Kobe Bryant 24; Rebs: Pau Gasol 8 Asts: Bryant, Fisher 6 each FT: Kobe Bryant 6/6	Pts: Kevin Garnett 24; Rebs: Kevin Garnett 13; Asts: Rajon Rondo 7 Stls: James Posey 2
**Boston leads series, 1–0**

TD Banknorth Garden, Boston, Massachusetts
Attendance: 18,624
Referees:
- No. 27 Dick Bavetta
- No. 48 Scott Foster
- No. 32 Eddie F. Rush

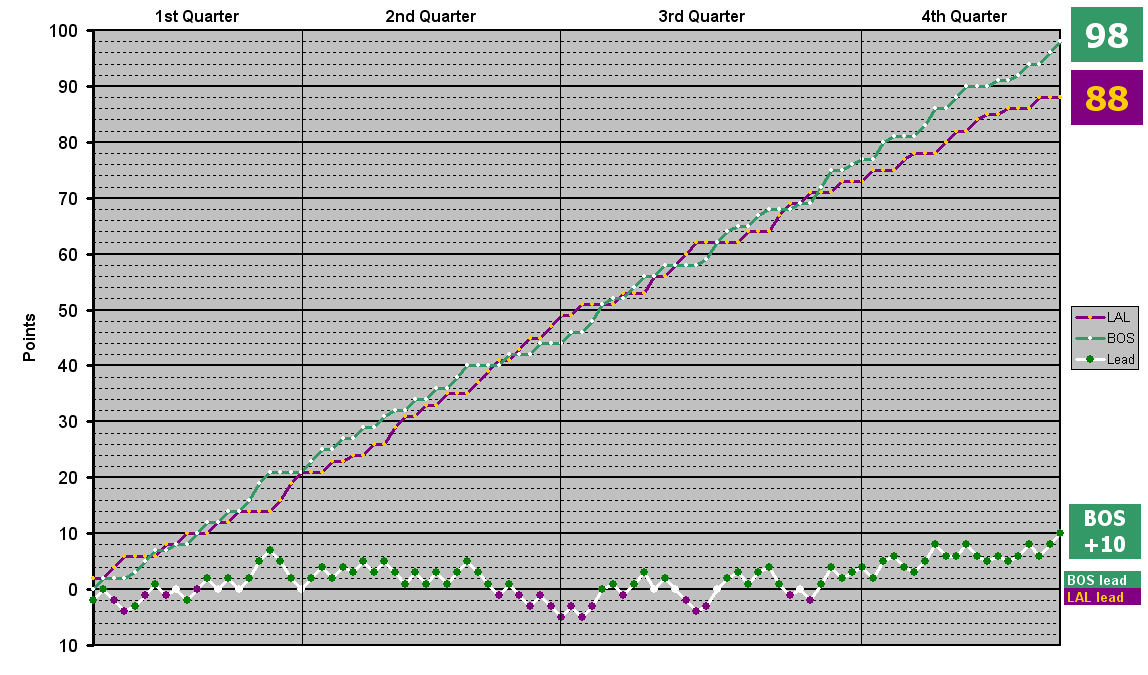
Game 1 running score.

Going into the game, LA have found themselves on the road in game 1 for the first time that playoffs. On the other hand, Boston, who were the league's best team, had home court advantage for the series. The game started very tight, with teams trading buckets and turnovers. For Boston, the go-to guy was Kevin Garnett, who had racked up 10 first-quarter points. For the Lakers, Kobe was struggling with his shot, as he went 1/7 for the quarter, but was dishing out assists and playing defense very solid, as he looked to get others involved early. Paul Pierce was also struggling, and has gotten himself into foul trouble early, as he had 3 points and 3 fouls going into the third quarter.

In the second quarter, Garnett had racked up 8 more points and had already matched his playoff points average at 18.8. Despite Garnett's monstrous efforts, the Celtics found themselves down 51–46 at halftime. The main reason for the Lakers lead was Pau Gasol, who was hitting tough fadeaways and layups, and had also gotten P.J. Brown in foul trouble with his physicality and footwork. On the other hand, Kobe Bryant was a non-factor offensively but was making up for it with the same kind of defense that earned him the 1st team All-defense. The Lakers ended the half on a 10–2 run.

In the beginning of the third quarter, Celtics forward Paul Pierce was injured after a collision with Celtics center and teammate, Kendrick Perkins. He was taken out of the game with 8:42 left in the quarter. The following offensive possession, Perkins was hit in the leg by the sneaker of Pau Gasol. He soon also left the game. But despite the injuries of their star players, the Celtics went on a 6–0 run and have regained the lead. But then Paul Pierce miraculously came back in the game, reinvigorating the crowd, and carried the Boston Celtics in the third quarter. Following his return Paul Pierce would shoot 6-6 from the field and hit three straight three pointers. Not to ignore the fact that Kobe exploded in that third quarter, hitting and defending shots from anywhere inside the arc, before getting himself in foul trouble late in the third. Paul Pierce scored 15 points on 4-4 shooting from the field in the third quarter to give Boston the lead going into the fourth.

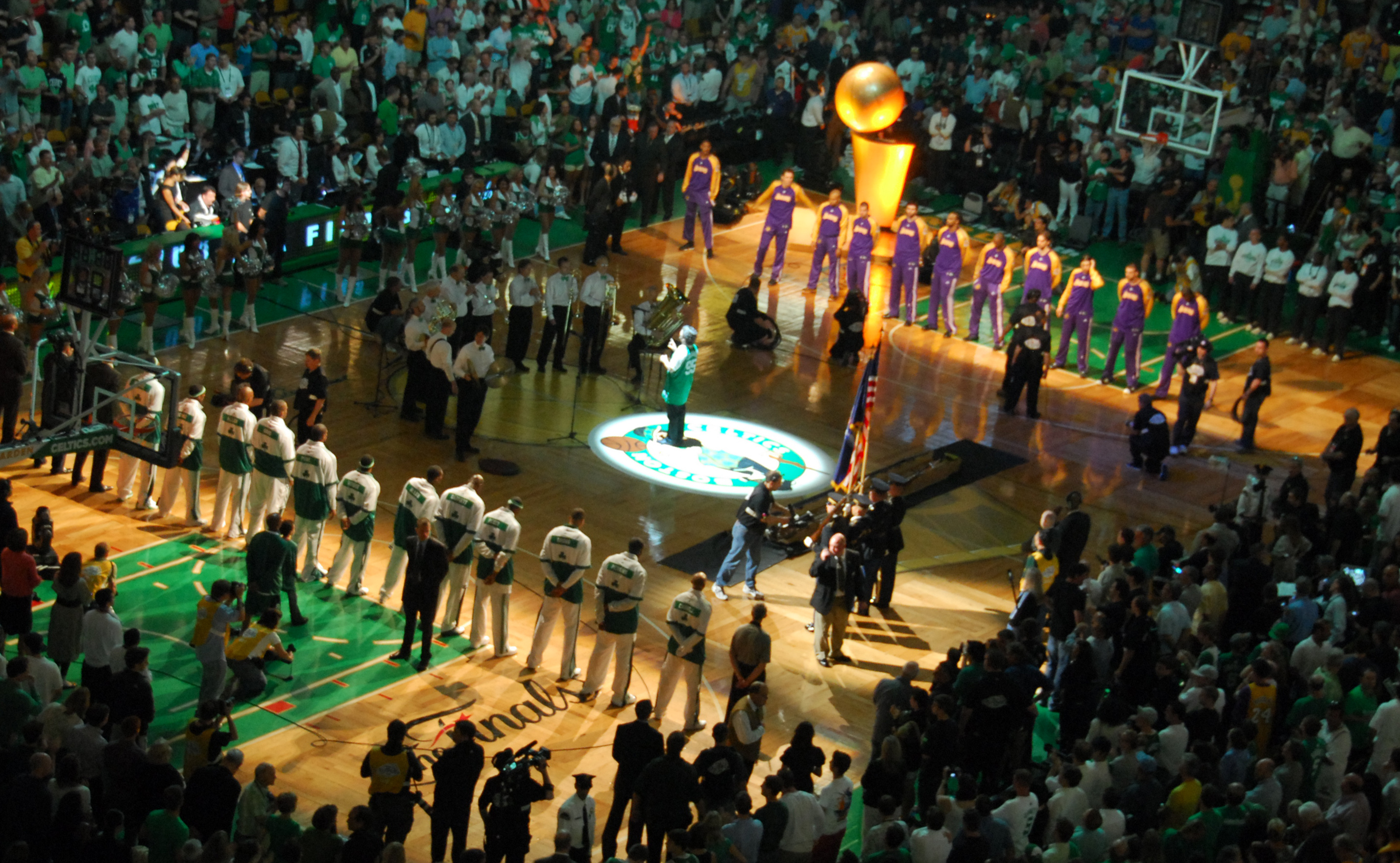
Players lineup prior to Game 2 for the national anthem at the TD Garden

Then in the fourth, the Celtics never trailed. Kobe sitting out the first half of the quarter due to foul trouble allowed Boston to slowly increase the lead all the way up to 10. Garnett's putback dunk over 2 Lakers defenders sealed the Celtics victory, completing his 24 points alongside 13 rebounds performance. For the Lakers, Kobe Bryant had 24 points. The Boston Celtics ended up winning game 1 with a final score of 98–88.

Pierce apparently injured his knee by falling awkwardly on Kendrick Perkins' leg, and was taken off the court in a wheelchair. Despite what Pierce's reaction suggested was a highly debilitating injury, he returned to action minutes later to raucous cheering from the crowd. Pierce admitted during coverage of the 2019 NBA Finals that he just had to use the bathroom. He soon hit two three-pointers on consecutive offensive possessions that gave Boston the lead for good and finished with 22 points. It was later dubbed by some as the "Wheelchair Game".

The Lakers, who had had home court advantage throughout the first three rounds and had not trailed a series in that same time, now had to do without both luxuries for the first time.

=== Game 2 ===
ABC, TSN, Cuatro, Canal+, Canal 7

June 8
9:00 pm

Recap
Video highlights on YouTube

Los Angeles Lakers 102, **Boston Celtics** **108**
Scoring by quarter: **22**–20, 20–**34**, 19–**29**, **41**–25
Pts: Kobe Bryant 30; Rebs: Radmanović, Gasol 10 each Asts: Kobe Bryant 8 Stls: Derek Fisher 3	Pts: Paul Pierce 28; Rebs: Kevin Garnett 14; Asts: Rajon Rondo 16; 3P-FG: Paul Pierce 4/4
**Boston leads series, 2–0**

TD Banknorth Garden, Boston, Massachusetts
Attendance: 18,624
Referees:
- No. 43 Dan Crawford
- No. 26 Bob Delaney
- No. 41 Ken Mauer

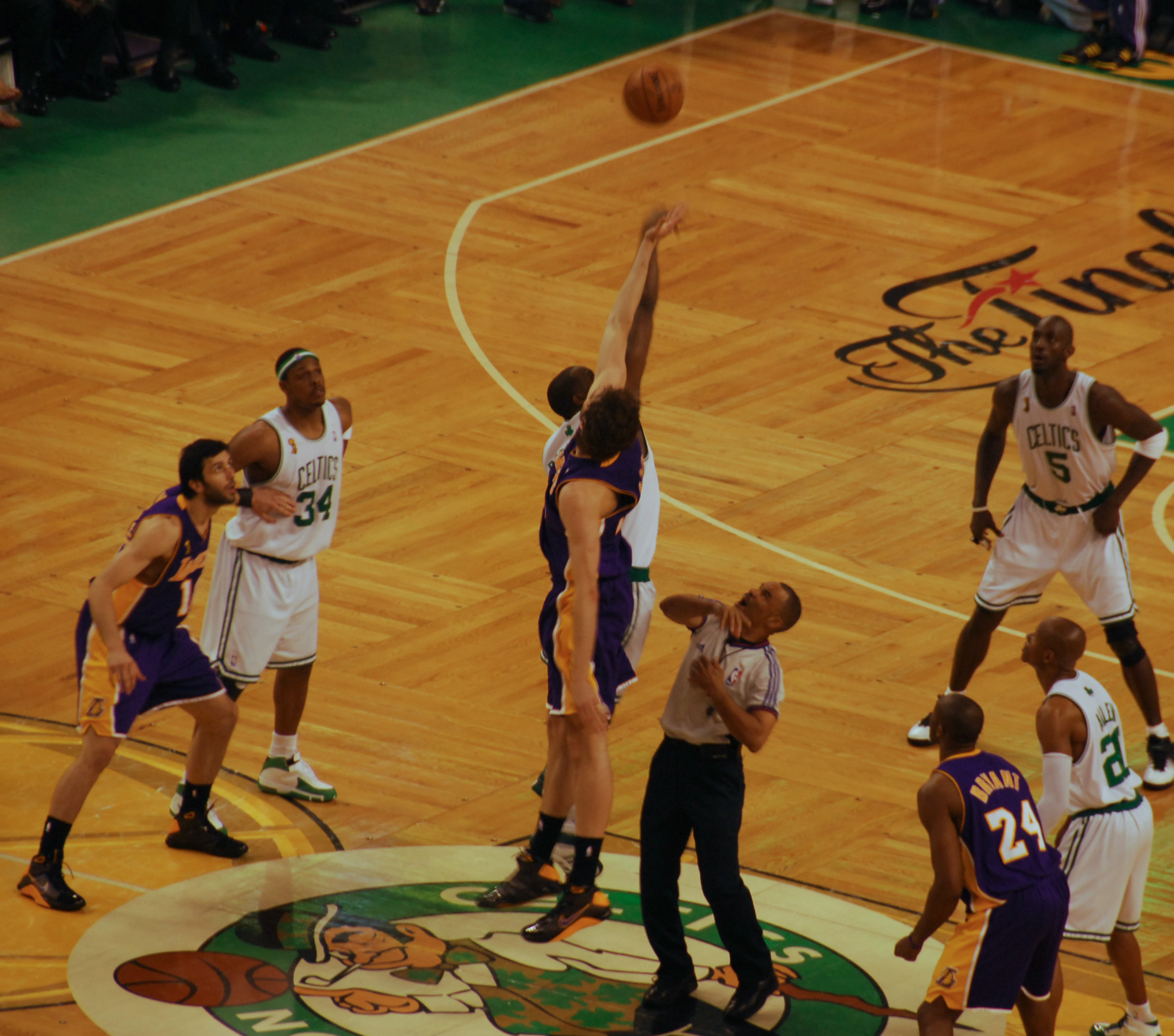
The opening tipoff of Game 2

From the tip-off, this game showed the Lakers' need for a win. The Lakers established an early 15–8 lead in the first quarter, highlighted by an early play where Pau Gasol scored a drop step, and-one poster layup and drew a foul against Kevin Garnett after a defensive rebound by Kobe Bryant. Boston responded by substituting sophomore forward Leon Powe, whose aggressive, physical style of play of drawing fouls drew ten free-throw attempts within his first three minutes on the court, helping the Celtics close the deficit. Despite Powe's heroics, the Lakers maintained their advantage to end the first quarter ahead 22–20.

In the second quarter, the Celtics decided to up the pace, and were able to rack up 10 unanswered points, as their defense has stopped LA's offense who haven't scored for the first 3 minutes of the quarter. The Celtics' defense also forced 9 turnovers by the Lakers (for reference, they had 8 turnovers in all of game 1) Paul Pierce decided to make up for his poor offensive efforts in the first half of game 1, as he scored 16 points in the first half. For the Lakers, Kobe got himself into foul trouble and the technical, which he got for taunting Ray Allen after making a tough lefty layup over him, didn't help. The Lakers team effort was the only thing keeping them alive in this game. The first half ended with the Boston Celtics holding a commanding 54–42 lead.

The Celtics have held the Lakers scoreless until 7:52 remaining in the third as their lead began getting bigger and bigger. The game fell for the Celtics, including back-to-back triples by Paul Pierce and Ray Allen. The Celtics built up a comfortable 20 point lead to end the third. The exclamation point on the blowout was Leon Powe with back-to-back poster slams over the Lakers' defense.

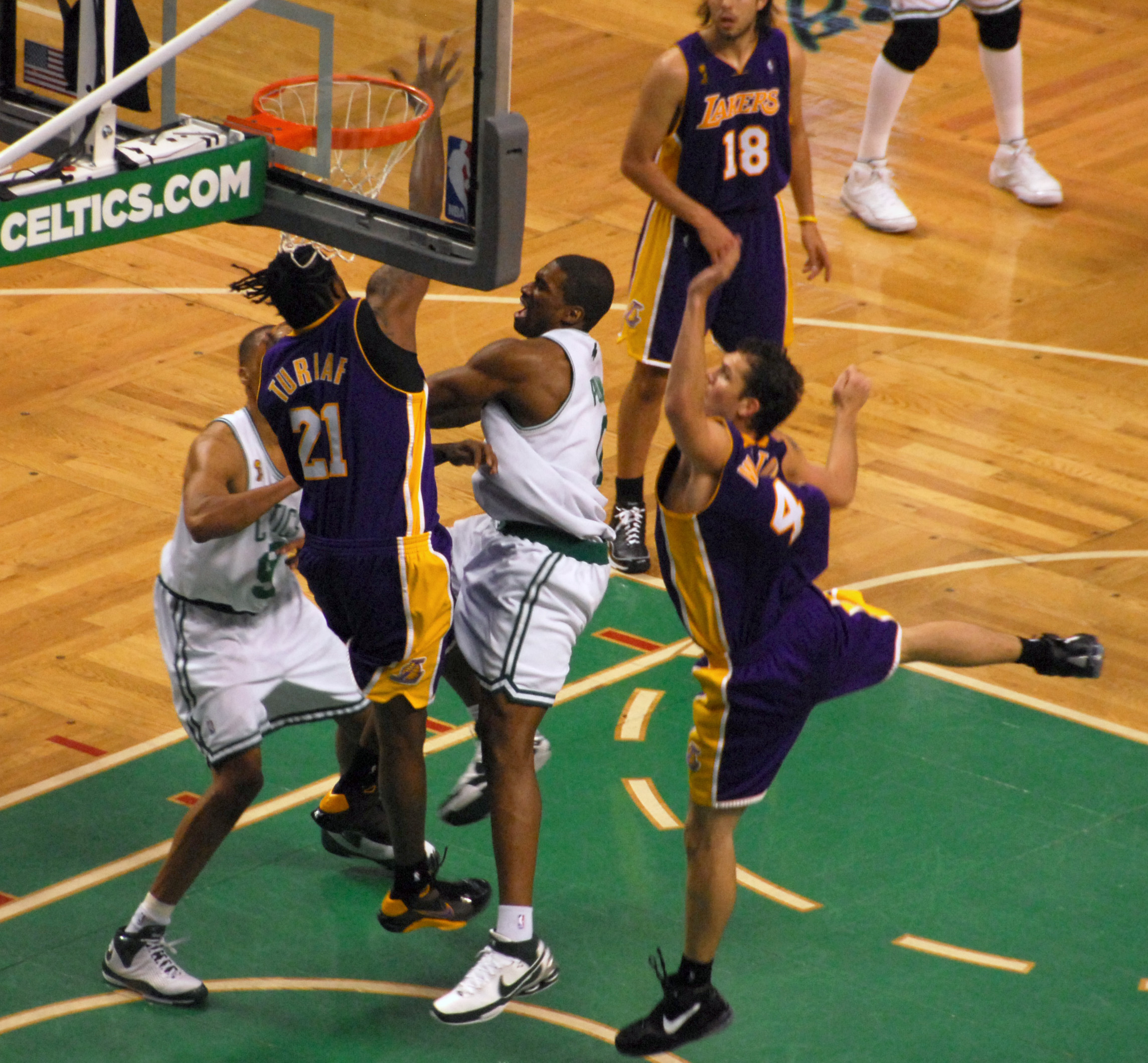
Leon Powe (center) had a memorable performance in Game 2

The Celtics' dominance transferred into the beginning of the fourth, as they jumped to a 24-point lead with little bit more than 7 minutes to play. Vladimir Radmanović and Saša Vujačić started shooting the lights out of the Celtics defense which had fallen asleep in the fourth, and before you knew it, the lead was down to 12. Kobe's shots also started falling, as he scored 22 points in the second half alone. Phil Jackson then decided to go small and has left only Lamar Odom on the court of the big men, and has subbed in 4 of the best shooters that he had. That has showed out to be very effective, as the Lakers would go on a historic 31–9 run spanning 7:34 to the final 38.4 seconds. But all that effort was nothing for Paul Pierce, who seemed unfazed by the pressure, and who has scored 2 free throws with 20 seconds remaining, and then blocked Vujačić's three to potentially make it a one-point game. After the defensive play, James Posey hit two free throws to make it a 6-point game, and then the Celtics proved to have the league's best defense by forcing another Lakers turnover. After a hard-fought battle, the Celtics walked away with a 6-point win and the 2–0 series lead as the series shifted to L.A.

Kobe Bryant finished the game with 30 points and 8 assists. For the Celtics, Paul Pierce scored 28 points, Rajon Rondo had a game-high 16 assists and Leon Powe scored 21 points on 6–7 shooting from the field and 9–13 from the line in 15 minutes of play, including back-to-back dunks in the last minute of the 3rd quarter, causing the Boston crowd to chant his name. Over the course of the game, Powe shot 13 free throws while the Lakers shot 10.

Despite injuries suffered by Pierce (sprained knee) and Kendrick Perkins (high ankle sprain), both players started in Game 2 and appeared to be mostly unhampered by the injuries, especially Pierce who finished with 28 points.

Boston finished the game 27-for-38 from the line, while the Lakers were 10-for-10. Some analysts viewed this as favorable treatment toward the Celtics, while others noted that a difference in playing styles may have led to the discrepancy, and that the actual foul discrepancy was only 28–21 in favor of Boston.

=== Game 3 ===
ABC, TSN, Cuatro, Canal+, Canal 7

June 10
9:00 pm (6:00 pm PDT)

Recap
Video highlights on YouTube

Boston Celtics 81, **Los Angeles Lakers** **87**
Scoring by quarter: 20–20, 17–**23**, **25**–17, 19–**27**
Pts: Ray Allen 25; Rebs: Kevin Garnett 12; Asts: Kevin Garnett 5 FG: Paul Pierce 2/14	Pts: Kobe Bryant 36; Rebs: Pau Gasol 12; Asts: Jordan Farmar 5 FG: Kobe Bryant 12/20
**Boston leads series, 2–1**

Staples Center, Los Angeles, California
Attendance: 18,997
Referees:
- No. 17 Joe Crawford
- No. 15 Bennett Salvatore
- No. 18 Mark Wunderlich

The Lakers won game 3 on a strong shooting night from regular season MVP Kobe Bryant, who scored a series-high 36 points, leading the Lakers to their first win of the series and adding to their undefeated streak at home in the 2008 postseason. Saša Vujačić scored 20 points in 28 minutes, Paul Pierce had a poor shooting game, making only two of his 14 field goal attempts. Kevin Garnett also had trouble shooting, finishing with only 12 points. Ray Allen was the only member of Boston's Big Three that scored over 13 points, with 25.

=== Game 4 ===
ABC, TSN, Cuatro, Canal+, Canal 7

June 12
9:00 pm (6:00 pm PDT)

Recap
Video highlights on YouTube

**Boston Celtics** **97**, Los Angeles Lakers 91
Scoring by quarter: 14–**35**, **26**–23, **31**–15, **26**–18
Pts: Paul Pierce 20; Rebs: Kevin Garnett 11; Asts: Paul Pierce 7 Stls: Ray Allen 3	Pts: Lamar Odom 19; Rebs: Gasol, Odom 10 each Asts: Kobe Bryant 10; Stls: Kobe Bryant 4
**Boston leads series, 3–1**

Staples Center, Los Angeles, California
Attendance: 18,997
Referees:
- No. 14 Joe DeRosa
- No. 29 Steve Javie
- No. 49 Tom Washington

The Lakers jumped out to a 35–14 lead after the first quarter, which was the largest first-quarter lead in NBA Finals history. The Lakers held their ground for most of the third quarter, leading by as many as 24 points. However, the Celtics went on a 21–3 run to end the third quarter, closing the deficit to only two points (73–71). With 4:07 remaining in the fourth quarter, the Celtics took their first lead in the game when Celtics' reserve Eddie House made an 18-foot (5.5 m) jumper. With House's shot, the Celtics were in the lead for good. The Celtics' victory in Game 4 was the largest comeback in NBA Finals history, a mark later surpassed in 2026 by the New York Knicks.

The Celtics bench outscored the Lakers bench 35–15, 29 of those points coming from House and James Posey. Kevin Garnett finished with 16 points and 11 rebounds in support of Allen (19) and Pierce (20).

=== Game 5 ===
ABC, TSN, Cuatro, Canal+, Canal 7

June 15
9:00 pm (6:00 pm PDT)

Recap at the Wayback Machine (archived June 19, 2008)
Video highlights on YouTube

Boston Celtics 98, **Los Angeles Lakers** **103**
Scoring by quarter: 22–**39**, **30**–16, 18–**24**, **28**–24
Pts: Paul Pierce 38; Rebs: Kevin Garnett 14; Asts: Paul Pierce 8; **3 PTs** Ray Allen 3	Pts: Kobe Bryant 25; Rebs: Pau Gasol 13; Asts: Pau Gasol 6 Stls: Kobe Bryant 5
**Boston leads series, 3–2**

Staples Center, Los Angeles, California
Attendance: 18,997
Referees:
- No. 27 Dick Bavetta
- No. 48 Scott Foster
- No. 41 Ken Mauer

As in Game 4, the Lakers jumped out to an early lead, leading 43–24 with 11 minutes to play in the second quarter. And as in Game 4, the Celtics came back, taking a 62–60 lead behind the strong play of Paul Pierce.

The Lakers finally regained their composure, outscoring Boston 24–18 in the 3rd quarter. In previous games, the Lakers were outscored by Boston in the 3rd quarter (22–31 in Game 1, 19–29 in Game 2, 17–25 in Game 3, and 15–31 in Game 4) by a total of 43 points (73–116).

The Lakers built a 14-point lead in the 4th quarter, but the Celtics again came back with a 16–2 run to tie the game at 90. With less than one minute left in the game, the Celtics had the ball with the Lakers leading 97–95. Pierce beat Bryant off the drive, but Bryant knocked the ball out of Pierce's hands from behind. Lamar Odom picked up the loose ball and passed downcourt to Bryant for a breakaway dunk, giving the Lakers a 99–95 lead. The Lakers went on to win 103–98, sending the series back to Boston.

Kobe Bryant had 25 points, to go with five steals. Pau Gasol contributed 19 points, 13 rebounds and 6 assists, Odom 20 points and 11 rebounds. For Boston, Pierce had a memorable 38 point effort, but outside of Allen (16 points) and Garnett (13 points and 14 rebounds) did not receive enough support from his teammates to clinch the championship at Staples.

As for the odds stacked against the Lakers to come back from a 3–1 deficit, Jackson said, "We're young enough and dumb enough to do this."

=== Game 6 ===
ABC, TSN, Cuatro, Canal+, Canal 7

June 17
9:00 pm

Recap at the Wayback Machine (archived June 22, 2008)
Video highlights on YouTube

Los Angeles Lakers 92, **Boston Celtics** **131**
Scoring by quarter: 20–**24**, 15–**34**, 25–**31**, 32–**42**
Pts: Kobe Bryant 22; Rebs: Lamar Odom 10; Asts: Lamar Odom 5 FT: Kobe Bryant 5/5	Pts: Allen, Garnett 26 each Rebs: Kevin Garnett 14; Asts: Paul Pierce 10; Stls: Rajon Rondo 6
**Boston wins NBA Finals, 4–2**

TD Banknorth Garden, Boston, Massachusetts
Attendance: 18,624
Referees:
- No. 17 Joe Crawford
- No. 32 Eddie F. Rush
- No. 15 Bennett Salvatore

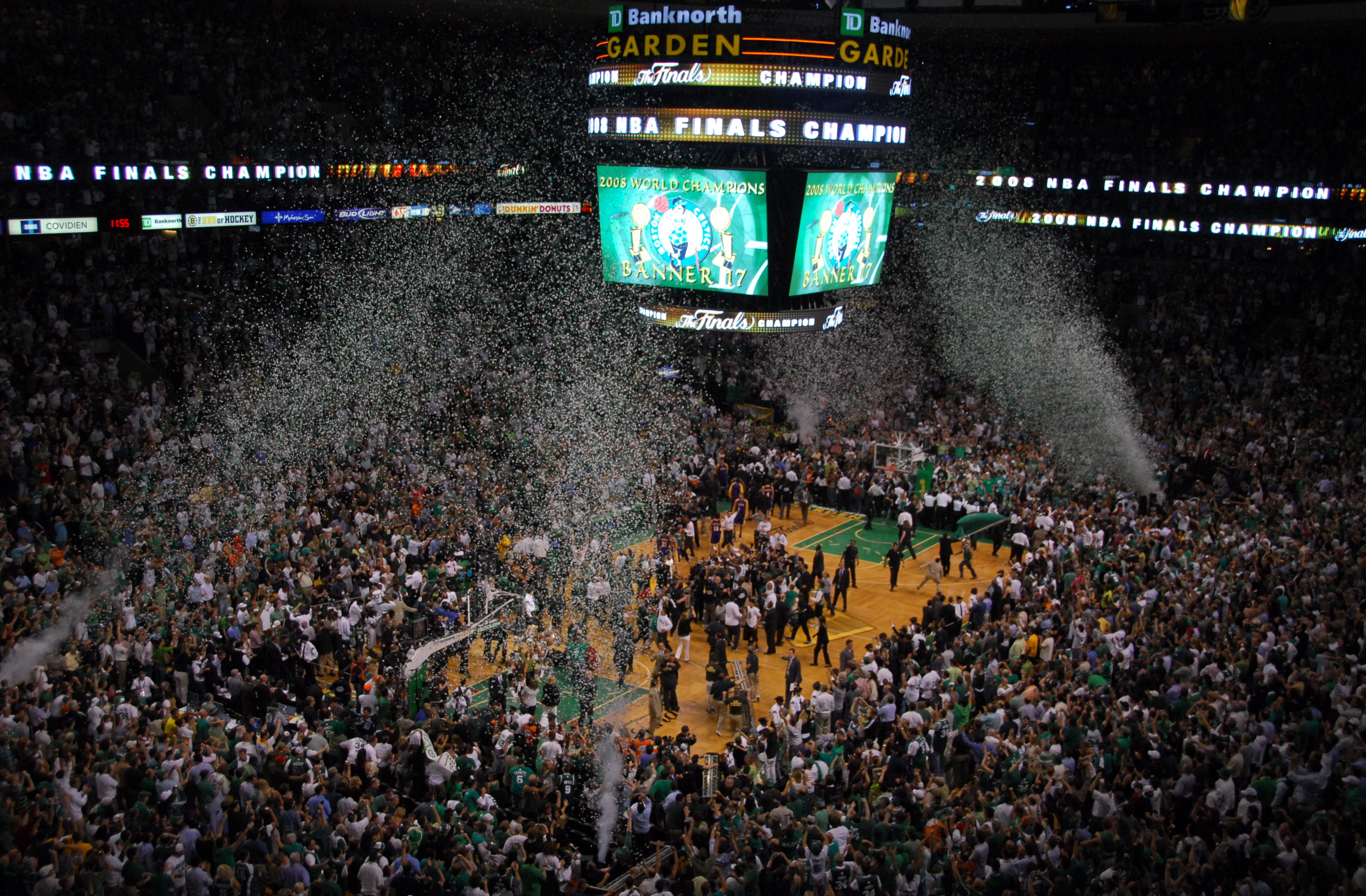
Boston Celtics fans, players, coaching personnel, and staff celebrate the franchise's 17th title on June 17

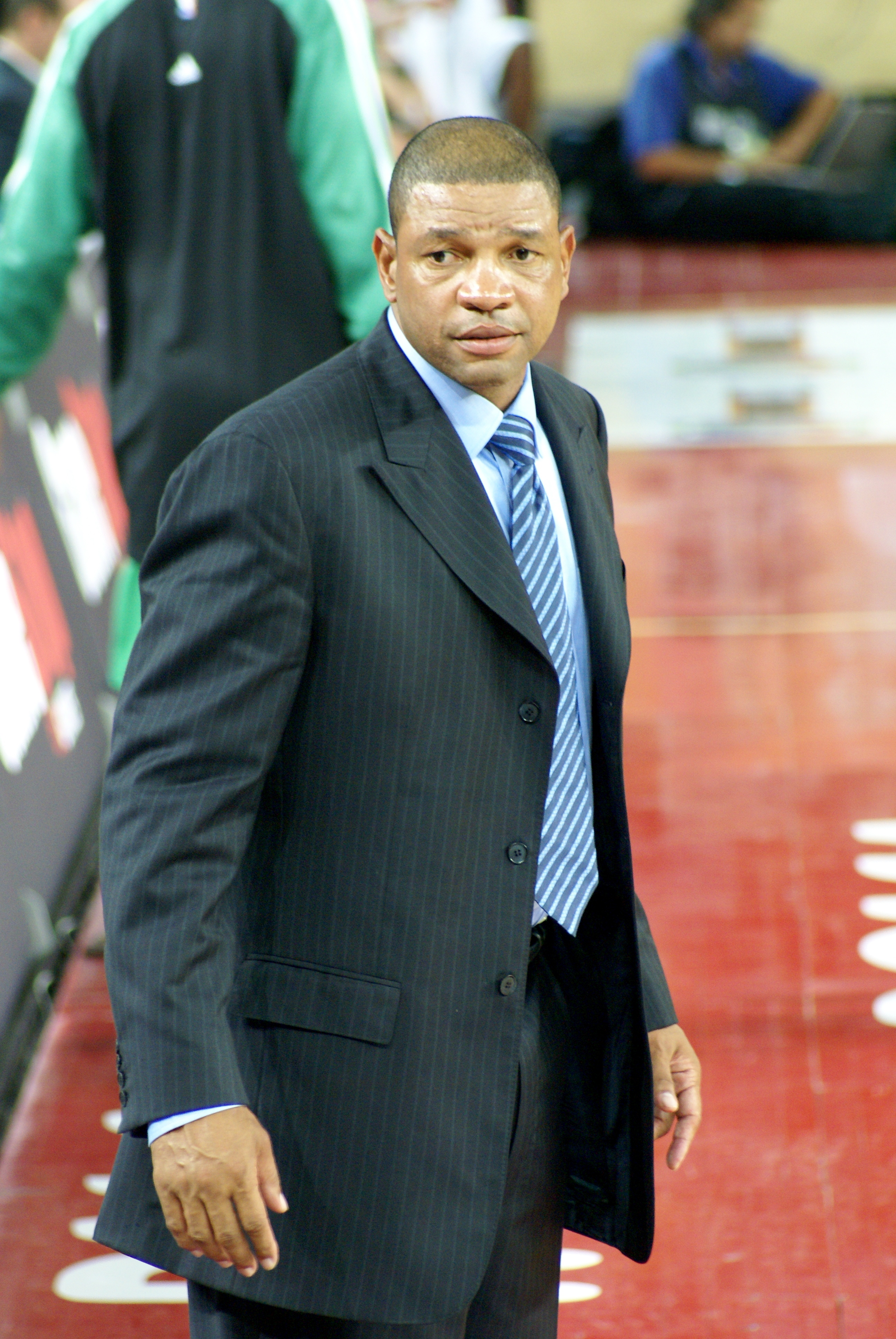
The Celtics needed 26 games to win their 17th title. By a twist of fate, Coach Doc Rivers played for the 1993–94 New York Knicks, which held the previous record for most playoff games played in one season, with 25.

Entering Game 6, the Celtics set a record of most playoff games played in one season, with 26, breaking the previous record of 25 set by both the 1994 New York Knicks, whom Celtics Coach Doc Rivers played for, and the 2005 Detroit Pistons, both of whom lost in their respective finals in seven games (Knicks in 1994, Pistons in 2005). However, for the 1994 Knicks, the first round was a best-of-five. Since the NBA Finals used the 2-3-2 format from 1985 until 2013, no team has ever won the last two games on the road.

After a rocky first quarter, the Celtics dominated the rest of the game. Maintaining a lead of more than 25 points, the Celtics' Big Three performed phenomenally, while the whole team smothered the Lakers' offense with their tight defense. Boston dominated in numerous statistical categories, including rebounds (48–29, with a 14–2 disparity in offensive boards), turnovers (7–19), steals (18–4), assists (33–16) and blocks (4–0). Five Celtics finished in double figures. Ray Allen hit seven three-pointers to tie what was then the Finals record (which he subsequently broke during the 2010 NBA Finals against the Lakers during game two), Rajon Rondo had an all-around spectacular performance (21 points, 8 rebounds, 7 assists, 6 steals), the Celtics only turned the ball over seven times and set a Finals record with 18 steals, and every Boston player who saw action scored.

Kevin Garnett delivered his famous "anything is possible" speech during an interview with Michele Tafoya directly after the game.

The 39-point margin of victory was the largest ever in an NBA championship-clinching game, breaking the old record of 33, also set by the Celtics over the Lakers in Game Five of the 1965 NBA Finals, 129–96. This lead was close to the Finals point-spread record set in Game 3 in 1998 where a Michael Jordan-led Chicago Bulls team beat the Utah Jazz by 42 points, 96–54. The Celtics also improved their overall record against the Lakers to 9–2 in Finals meetings, beating them in the Finals for the first time since 1984.

This was the Celtics' 17th championship, their first since 1986, extending their record for most NBA championships won by a single team. All this capped off the Celtics' best regular season (66–16) since their previous championship season in which they went 67–15. It was also a sense of relief, as the Celtics set an NBA record for most playoff games ever needed to win a championship, with 26, surpassing the previous record of 24 by the Lakers in 1988.

The Celtics' win was also seen as an addition to the recent success of Boston-area sports teams, following the wins by the New England Patriots in Super Bowls XXXVI, XXXVIII, and XXXIX (2001, 2003 and 2004 seasons) and the Red Sox's World Series wins in 2004 (death of the Curse of the Bambino) and 2007.

The Celtics won this series by winning Games 1, 2, 4, and 6; coincidentally, the last time the two teams met in 1987, the Lakers won that series in identical fashion. It was also the same identical fashion when the Celtics won the NBA Finals in 1986 before this championship.

== Rosters ==
=== Boston Celtics ===
2007–08 Boston Celtics roster
Players

Pos.	No.	Player	Height	Weight	DOB	From
G	20	Ray Allen	6 ft 5 in (1.96 m)	205 lb (93 kg)		Connecticut
G	42	Tony Allen	6 ft 4 in (1.93 m)	213 lb (97 kg)		Oklahoma State
F/C	93	P.J. Brown	6 ft 11 in (2.11 m)	239 lb (108 kg)		Louisiana Tech
G	28	Sam Cassell	6 ft 3 in (1.91 m)	185 lb (84 kg)		Florida State
F	11	Glen Davis	6 ft 9 in (2.06 m)	289 lb (131 kg)		LSU
F/C	5	Kevin Garnett	6 ft 11 in (2.11 m)	220 lb (100 kg)		Farragut
G	50	Eddie House	6 ft 1 in (1.85 m)	175 lb (79 kg)		Arizona State
C	43	Kendrick Perkins	6 ft 10 in (2.08 m)	264 lb (120 kg)		CJOHS
G/F	34	Paul Pierce	6 ft 7 in (2.01 m)	235 lb (107 kg)		Kansas
C	66	Scot Pollard	6 ft 11 in (2.11 m)	278 lb (126 kg)		Kansas
F	41	James Posey	6 ft 8 in (2.03 m)	217 lb (98 kg)		Xavier
F	0	Leon Powe	6 ft 8 in (2.03 m)	240 lb (109 kg)		California
G	13	Gabe Pruitt	6 ft 4 in (1.93 m)	170 lb (77 kg)		USC
G	9	Rajon Rondo	6 ft 1 in (1.85 m)	171 lb (78 kg)		Kentucky
F	44	Brian Scalabrine	6 ft 9 in (2.06 m)	235 lb (107 kg)		USC

Coaches
**Head coach**
- (United States) Doc Rivers (Marquette)
**Assistant(s)**
- (United States) Armond Hill (Princeton)
- (United States) Kevin Eastman (Richmond)
- (United States) Clifford Ray (Oklahoma)
- (United States) Mike Longabardi (Frostburg State)
- (United States) Tom Thibodeau (Salem State)

**Legend**
- **(DP)** Unsigned draft pick
- **(FA)** Free agent
- **(S)** Suspended
- Injured

Roster
Updated: March 4, 2008

=== Los Angeles Lakers ===
2007–08 Los Angeles Lakers roster
Players

Pos.	No.	Player	Height	Weight	DOB	From
F	3	Trevor Ariza	6 ft 8 in (2.03 m)	220 lb (100 kg)		UCLA
G/F	24	Kobe Bryant	6 ft 6 in (1.98 m)	205 lb (93 kg)		Lower Merion HS (PA)
C	17	Andrew Bynum	7 ft 0 in (2.13 m)	285 lb (129 kg)		St. Joseph HS (NJ)
G	5	Jordan Farmar	6 ft 2 in (1.88 m)	180 lb (82 kg)		UCLA
G	2	Derek Fisher	6 ft 1 in (1.85 m)	210 lb (95 kg)		Little Rock
F/C	16	Pau Gasol	7 ft 0 in (2.13 m)	260 lb (118 kg)		Spain
G	11	Coby Karl	6 ft 5 in (1.96 m)	215 lb (98 kg)		Boise State
C	28	D. J. Mbenga	7 ft 0 in (2.13 m)	215 lb (98 kg)		DR Congo
C	31	Chris Mihm	7 ft 0 in (2.13 m)	245 lb (111 kg)		Texas
F	14	Ira Newble	6 ft 7 in (2.01 m)	220 lb (100 kg)		Miami (OH)
F	7	Lamar Odom	6 ft 10 in (2.08 m)	230 lb (104 kg)		Rhode Island
F	10	Vladimir Radmanović	6 ft 10 in (2.08 m)	235 lb (107 kg)		Serbia
F	21	Ronny Turiaf	6 ft 10 in (2.08 m)	250 lb (113 kg)		Gonzaga
G	18	Saša Vujačić	6 ft 7 in (2.01 m)	205 lb (93 kg)		Slovenia
F	4	Luke Walton	6 ft 8 in (2.03 m)	235 lb (107 kg)		Arizona

Coaches
**Head coach**
- (United States) Phil Jackson (North Dakota)
**Assistant(s)**
- (United States) Frank Hamblen (Syracuse)
- (United States) Kurt Rambis (Santa Clara)
- (United States) Brian Shaw (UC Santa Barbara)
- (United States) Kareem Abdul-Jabbar (UCLA)
- (United States) Craig Hodges (Long Beach State)
- (United States) Jim Cleamons (Ohio State)
- (United States) Tex Winter (USC)

**Legend**
- **(DP)** Unsigned draft pick
- **(FA)** Free agent
- **(S)** Suspended
- Injured

Roster
Updated: March 21, 2008

== Player statistics ==
Legend
GP	Games played	GS	Games started	MPG	Minutes per game
FG%	Field-goal percentage	3P%	3-point field-goal percentage	FT%	Free-throw percentage
RPG	Rebounds per game	APG	Assists per game	SPG	Steals per game
BPG	Blocks per game	PPG	Points per game

Boston Celtics

Boston Celtics statistics
Player	GP	GS	MPG	FG%	3P%	FT%	RPG	APG	SPG	BPG	PPG
Ray Allen	6	6	**41.0**	.507	**.524**	.867	5.0	2.5	1.3	0.7	20.3
Tony Allen	3	0	6.3	**.667**	.000	.000	0.3	0.7	0.3	0.0	2.7
P. J. Brown	6	0	19.5	.391	.000	.750	3.2	0.7	0.5	0.5	4.0
Sam Cassell	5	0	10.1	.375	.000	**1.000**	0.2	1.2	0.4	0.0	3.8
Glen Davis	1	0	14.6	.500	.000	.500	4.0	0.0	0.0	0.0	3.0
Kevin Garnett	6	6	37.9	.429	.000	.760	**13.0**	3.0	**1.7**	**1.0**	18.2
Eddie House	4	0	18.5	.357	.412	.833	2.5	2.5	0.3	0.0	8.0
Kendrick Perkins	5	5	18.4	.571	.000	.667	3.6	0.4	0.6	**1.0**	4.0
Paul Pierce	6	6	38.8	.432	.393	.830	4.5	6.3	1.2	0.3	**21.8**
James Posey	6	0	25.2	.500	.500	**1.000**	3.8	0.5	1.3	0.2	8.7
Leon Powe	6	1	8.9	.550	.000	.714	3.2	0.0	0.0	0.0	6.2
Rajon Rondo	6	6	27.0	.377	.000	.593	3.8	**6.7**	1.5	0.5	9.3

Los Angeles Lakers

Los Angeles Lakers statistics
Player	GP	GS	MPG	FG%	3P%	FT%	RPG	APG	SPG	BPG	PPG
Trevor Ariza	5	0	7.0	**.556**	.333	.500	1.8	0.2	0.2	0.2	2.6
Kobe Bryant	6	6	**43.0**	.405	.321	.796	4.7	**5.0**	**2.7**	0.2	**25.7**
Jordan Farmar	6	0	19.2	.484	**.529**	.750	1.8	1.3	0.3	0.5	7.0
Derek Fisher	6	6	31.2	.405	.188	.824	1.5	3.2	1.5	0.0	10.8
Pau Gasol	6	6	39.0	.532	.000	.647	**10.2**	3.3	0.5	0.5	14.7
Chris Mihm	1	0	2.8	.000	.000	.000	0.0	0.0	0.0	0.0	0.0
Lamar Odom	6	6	36.7	.517	.200	.643	9.0	3.0	0.3	**1.0**	13.5
Vladimir Radmanović	6	6	21.3	.390	.385	**1.000**	4.8	1.3	0.7	0.0	7.3
Ronny Turiaf	6	0	10.4	.500	.000	.250	0.7	0.0	0.0	0.5	1.8
Sasha Vujačić	6	0	22.0	.391	.348	.857	2.0	0.8	0.5	0.2	8.3
Luke Walton	6	0	11.0	.313	.333	.750	1.0	1.2	0.2	0.2	2.5

== Broadcasting ==
The Finals, produced by ESPN, were aired on ABC in the United States for the sixth consecutive year. This was also Michele Tafoya's last Finals appearance as a sideline reporter due to her resignation shortly before the 2008–09 season. She was later succeeded by Doris Burke (2009–19), Rachel Nichols (2020), Malika Andrews (2021), and Lisa Salters (2022–present).

Local TV broadcasts of the competing franchises were Los Angeles' KABC-TV and Boston's WCVB-TV.

=== International broadcasts ===
Aside from ABC (U.S.) and TSN (Canada), other broadcasters across the world covered the Finals:

- Argentina: Canal 7
- Australia: ESPN
- Belgium: Be 1 and Prime Sport 1
- Belize: Great Belize Television and Tropical Vision Limited (all games except games 2 and 5 joined in progress; Sunday games covered in full)
- Bosnia and Herzegovina: OBN
- Brazil: ESPN Latin America
- China: CCTV-5, several provincial broadcasters
- Denmark: DK4 Sport
- Dominican Republic: Antena Latina
- Finland: Urheilukanava
- France: Sport+
- Germany: Premiere Sport
- Greece: Sport+
- Haiti: Tele Caraibes
- Hong Kong: ESPN, Cable TV Hong Kong Sports Channel, Star Sports, TVB HD
- Hungary: Sport1, Sport2
- India: ESPN
- Indonesia: ESPN, Jak TV, Star Sports
- Italy: Sky sport
- Israel: Sport 5
- Japan: J Sports Plus, NHK BS-1, SkyPerfecTV
- South Korea: SBS Sports, Star Sports
- Latvia: LTV7
- Mexico: TVC
- (Arab League) Middle East, North Africa: ART Sport 3
- Netherlands: Sport1
- Philippines: C/S Sports on RPN, ABS-CBN Basketball TV
- Poland: Canal+Sport1
- Portugal: Sport TV 1
- Russia: NBA TV
- Spain: Canal +, Cuatro
- Sweden: TV4 AB
- Taiwan: Videoland
- Thailand: ESPN
- Turkey: NTV
- United Kingdom: Five
- Venezuela: Sport Plus
- New Zealand: Sky TV

== Aftermath ==
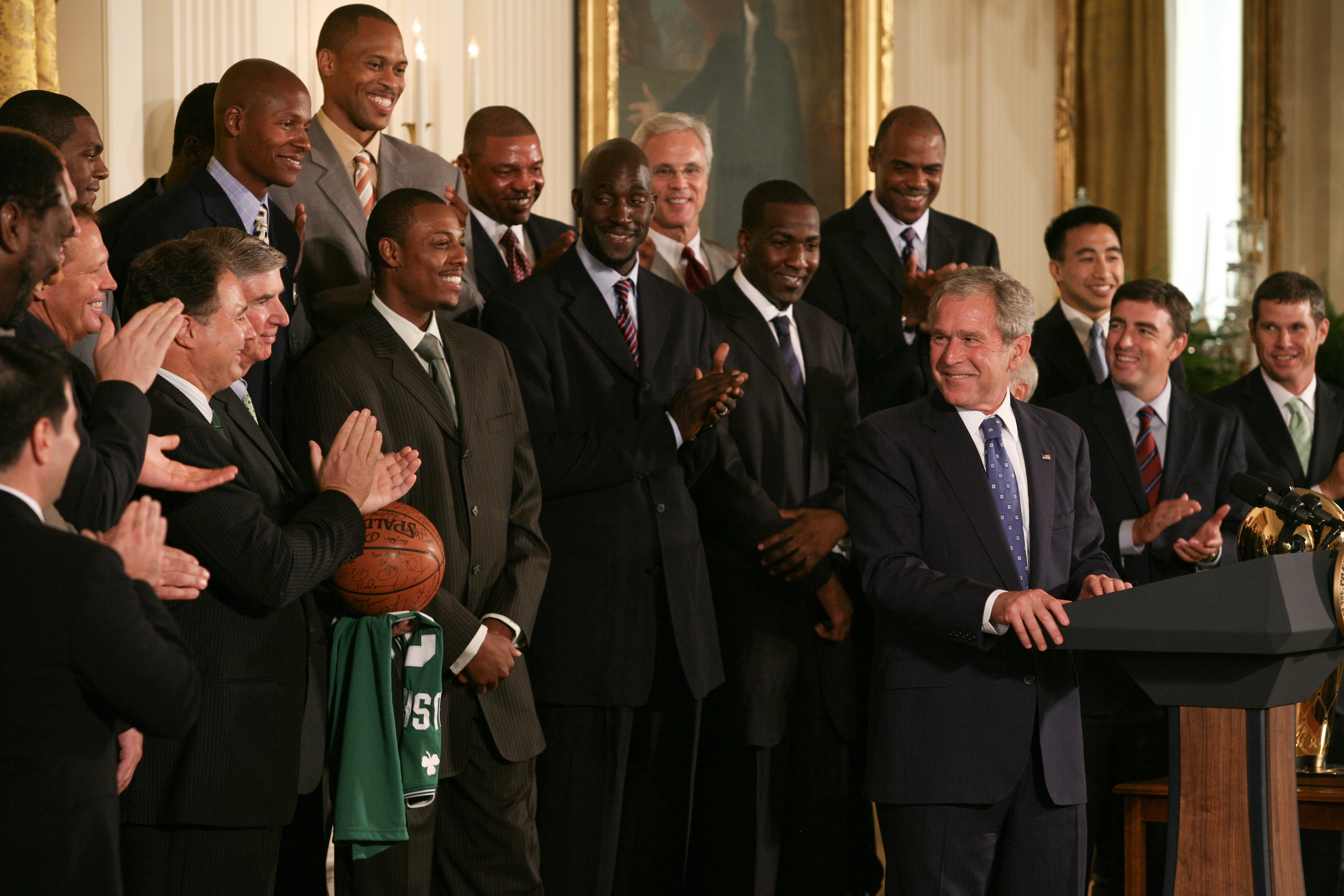
The 2008 NBA champion Boston Celtics with President George W. Bush at the White House

In the 2008–09 season, the Celtics got off to an impressive start with a 27–2 record, marking the best start through 29 games in NBA history. However, their momentum halted when they faced the Lakers on Christmas Day in a fateful finals rematch, bringing an end to their franchise-high 19-game winning streak. Shortly after the 2009 All-Star Game, Kevin Garnett suffered a devastating right knee injury which sidelined him for the remainder of the season. Despite finishing the season with 62 wins, the absence of Garnett had a noticeable impact on the team's performance as they were eliminated in seven games by the Dwight Howard-led Orlando Magic in the 2009 Eastern Conference semifinals.

The Lakers experienced a resurgence in the subsequent season, winning 65 games and clinching the 2009 NBA championship title in five games after overcoming the Dwight Howard-led Orlando Magic. Even though another mid-season injury to Andrew Bynum threatened their title drive, he did come back late in the season. The 2008–09 Los Angeles Lakers became the first team since the 1988–89 Detroit Pistons to win the NBA Finals after losing it in the previous year.

Both teams would eventually meet again in 2010, where the Lakers exacted revenge by finding themselves pitted against the Boston Celtics for the second time in three years. The Lakers avenged their 2008 NBA Finals loss and repeated as NBA Champions after besting Boston in seven games, winning their fifth NBA Championship title in the last ten seasons. The Lakers would not return to the NBA Finals again until a decade later, where the 2019–2020 team, led by LeBron James and Anthony Davis, won the NBA championship. The Celtics would not return to make another appearance in the Finals again until 12 years later in 2022, where the Jaylen Brown and Jayson Tatum-led team eventually succumbed to the Stephen Curry-led Golden State Warriors in six games. Two years thereafter, the Celtics would reach the NBA Finals yet again in 2024, emerging victorious in a five-game series over the Luka Dončić and Kyrie Irving-led Dallas Mavericks, garnering their first championship title in 16 years and 18th overall, effectively consolidating their position as the NBA franchise with the highest number of NBA championship titles. On the 2024 Celtics championship team as an assistant coach was 2008 Celtics alum Sam Cassell.

== See also ==
- Celtics–Lakers rivalry
