= Leon Powe =

American basketball player (born 1984)

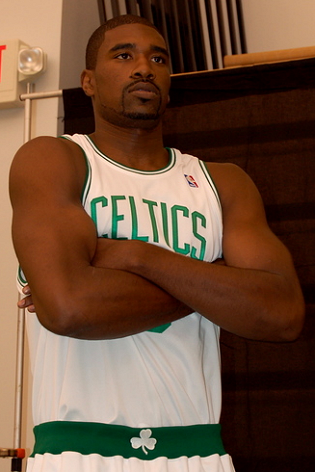
- Powe with the Boston Celtics in 2007

Boston Celtics
- Title: Community ambassador
- League: NBA

Personal information
- Born: January 22, 1984 (age 42) Oakland, California, U.S.
- Listed height: 6 ft 8 in (2.03 m)
- Listed weight: 240 lb (109 kg)

Career information
- High school: Oakland Tech (Oakland, California)
- College: California (2003–2006)
- NBA draft: 2006: 2nd round, 49th overall pick
- Drafted by: Denver Nuggets
- Playing career: 2006–2012
- Position: Power forward
- Number: 0, 44, 7

Career history
- 2006–2009: Boston Celtics
- 2009–2011: Cleveland Cavaliers
- 2011: Memphis Grizzlies
- 2012: Atléticos de San Germán

Career highlights
- NBA champion (2008); Consensus second-team All-American (2006); Pac-10 tournament MVP (2006); 2× First-team All-Pac-10 (2004, 2006); Pac-10 Freshman of the Year (2004); McDonald's All-American (2003); First-team Parade All-American (2003); Third-team Parade All-American (2002)

Career NBA statistics
- Points: 5,273 (6.2 ppg)
- Rebounds: 911 (3.8 rpg)
- Blocks: 82 (0.3 bpg)
- Stats at NBA.com
- Stats at Basketball Reference

Leon Powe Jr. (/ˈpoʊ/; born January 22, 1984) is an American former professional basketball player. Drafted in 2006 by the Denver Nuggets, Powe grew up in Oakland, California, and played college basketball for the California Golden Bears. He played his first three years in the NBA with the Boston Celtics and won a championship with the team in 2008. From 2009 to 2011, Powe played for the Cleveland Cavaliers. He also had a stint with the Memphis Grizzlies in 2011. After a stint in Puerto Rico, Powe announced his retirement in 2014 citing multiple injuries and his desire to become a businessman.

== Early life ==
Powe grew up in Oakland, California. His father left him when he was two years old. When he was seven years old, the family's house burned down and they were homeless for years. They moved more than twenty times within six years. He and his siblings were taken away from their mother by the state of California and put into foster care. Powe's mother died four days before he played in the 2002 Division 1 Boys' Basketball California Interscholastic Federation state championship.

== High school career ==
Powe attended Oakland Technical High School along with former Seattle Seahawks running back Marshawn Lynch, where he averaged 27.4 ppg, 14.2 rpg and 3.1 bpg as a senior. With Powe in the roster, Oakland Tech won the CIF Oakland Section Championship and also reached the CIF State Championships in 2002 and 2003. He was named a first-team Parade All-American and the Gatorade California Player of the Year during his senior year. A highly rated prep star, Powe was selected to play in the McDonald's All-American game and became the first Oakland Tech athlete to have his number retired by the school.

== College career ==
Powe played college basketball at the University of California, Berkeley, for the Golden Bears from 2003 to 2006. Although he was present for three seasons, he did not play in his sophomore year (2004–05) due to a serious knee injury. During his freshman season, he was named the Pac-10 Freshman of the Year, leading the conference in rebounding.

Questions abounded about whether Powe would return to form following his knee surgery, but he worked hard and rehabilitated to become a dominant force on the interior as he continued to improve his game. He produced 20.5 PPG and 10.1 RPG while leading Cal to a 20–11 record and a berth in the NCAA tournament.

Powe was named California's most valuable player during a banquet in April 2006. Powe, who also was selected Cal's MVP as a freshman in 2004, averaged 20.5 ppg and 10.1 rpg to become just the sixth player ever to pace the Pac-10 Conference in both categories. Named a second-team All-American by the Associated Press, the U.S. Basketball Writers and ESPN.com, he was chosen to the All-Pac-10 First Team for a second time in 2006.

== Professional career ==
After his junior year, Powe decided to enter his name in the 2006 NBA draft. Powe was selected by the Denver Nuggets in the second round as the 49th overall pick. The Nuggets subsequently traded him to the Boston Celtics. After playing for the Celtics summer league team, Powe was signed by the team to a 3-year contract. Although Powe did not reach the sum of 14 in his per game points, rebounds, and assists necessary to guarantee the second year of his contract, that second year became guaranteed when Boston did not waive him by July 1, 2007. Powe had a similar hurdle of 16 for the sum of the three statistics to guarantee the third year of his contract (2008–09).

=== 2006–07 NBA season ===
Powe played as a fourth string center behind Kendrick Perkins, Brian Scalabrine and Michael Olowokandi in his rookie season. After a rash of injuries submarined Boston's playoff chances, Powe received a limited opportunity to showcase his skills. He proved himself a capable defender who could alter shots and provide interior rebounding. On January 12, 2007, Powe made the most out of his 25 minutes and registered a career-high 12 rebounds against the Toronto Raptors. On April 10, 2007, he scored 19 points against the Atlanta Hawks. Powe finished the 2006–07 campaign averaging 4.2 points and 3.4 rebounds in just over 11 minutes per game.

=== 2007–08 NBA season ===
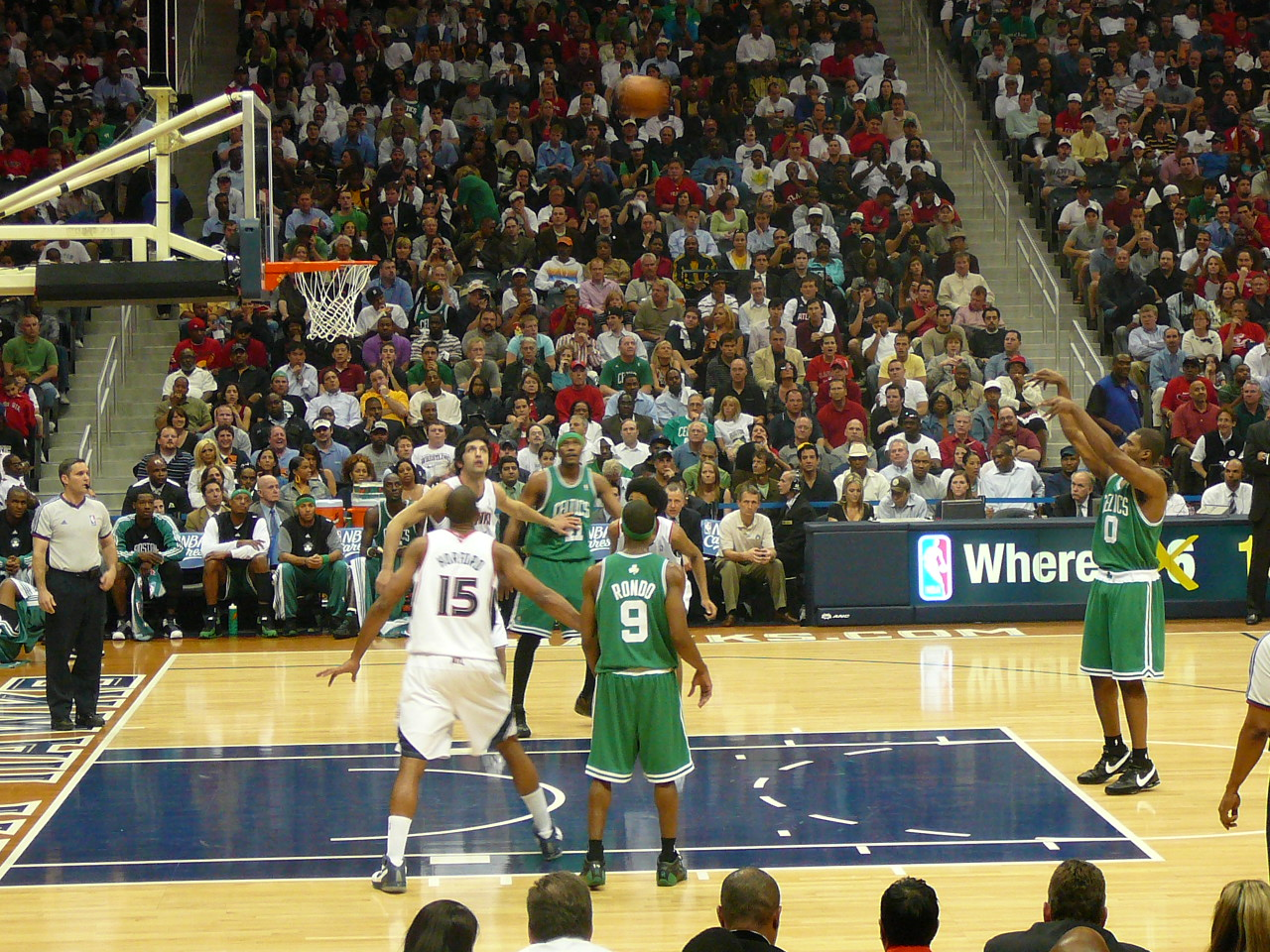
Powe shoots a free throw in Game 4 of the 2008 NBA Playoffs against the Atlanta Hawks.

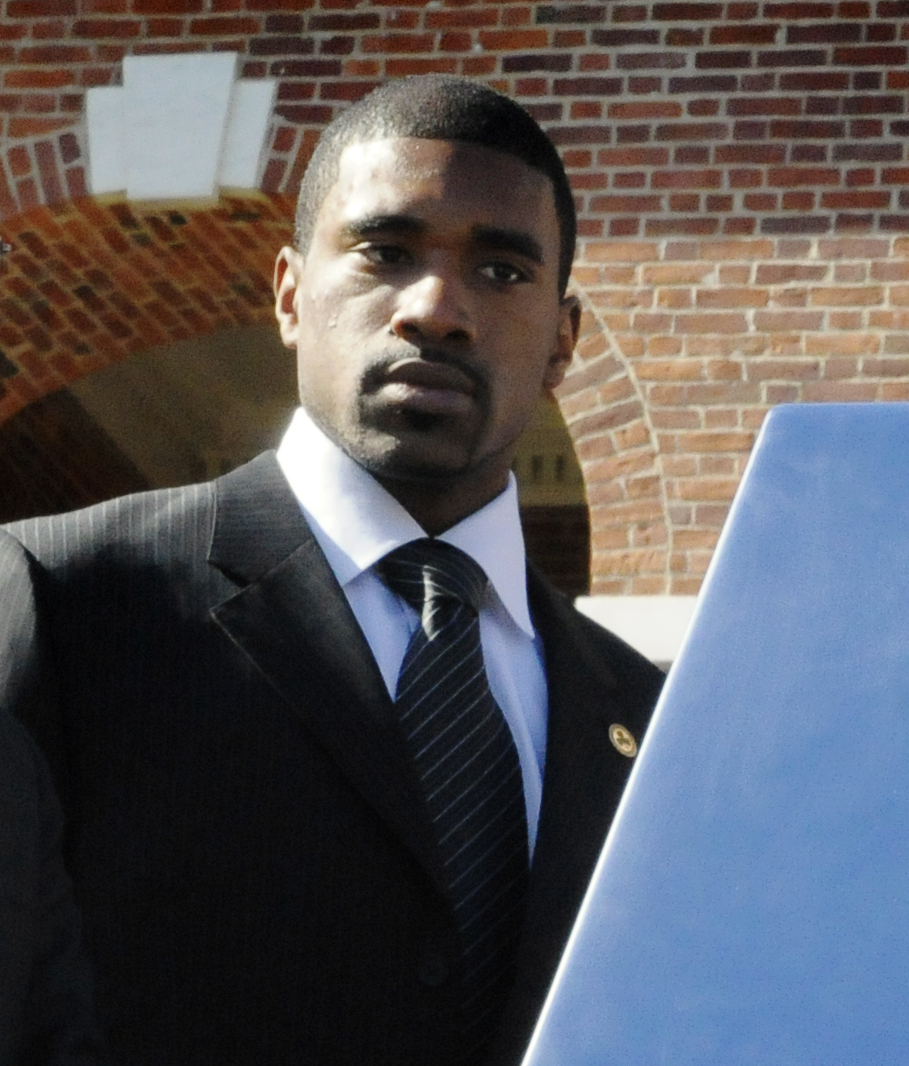
Powe at an event during the 2007–08 season

On January 29, 2008, Powe had a breakout performance that took place in Miami against the Heat, as he effectively filled in the blank of the absent main contributors Kevin Garnett and Ray Allen, scoring 25 points and grabbing 11 rebounds en route to a 117–87 blowout victory. He also scored his career-high 27 points in the last game of the season against the New Jersey Nets on April 16, 2008.

One of his most notable performances of the season came in Game 2 of the 2008 NBA Finals against the Los Angeles Lakers on June 8, 2008, as he scored 21 points, which included several dunks and 13 free throw attempts in only 15 minutes of play in front of a crowd chanting his name en route to a 108–102 Celtics victory.

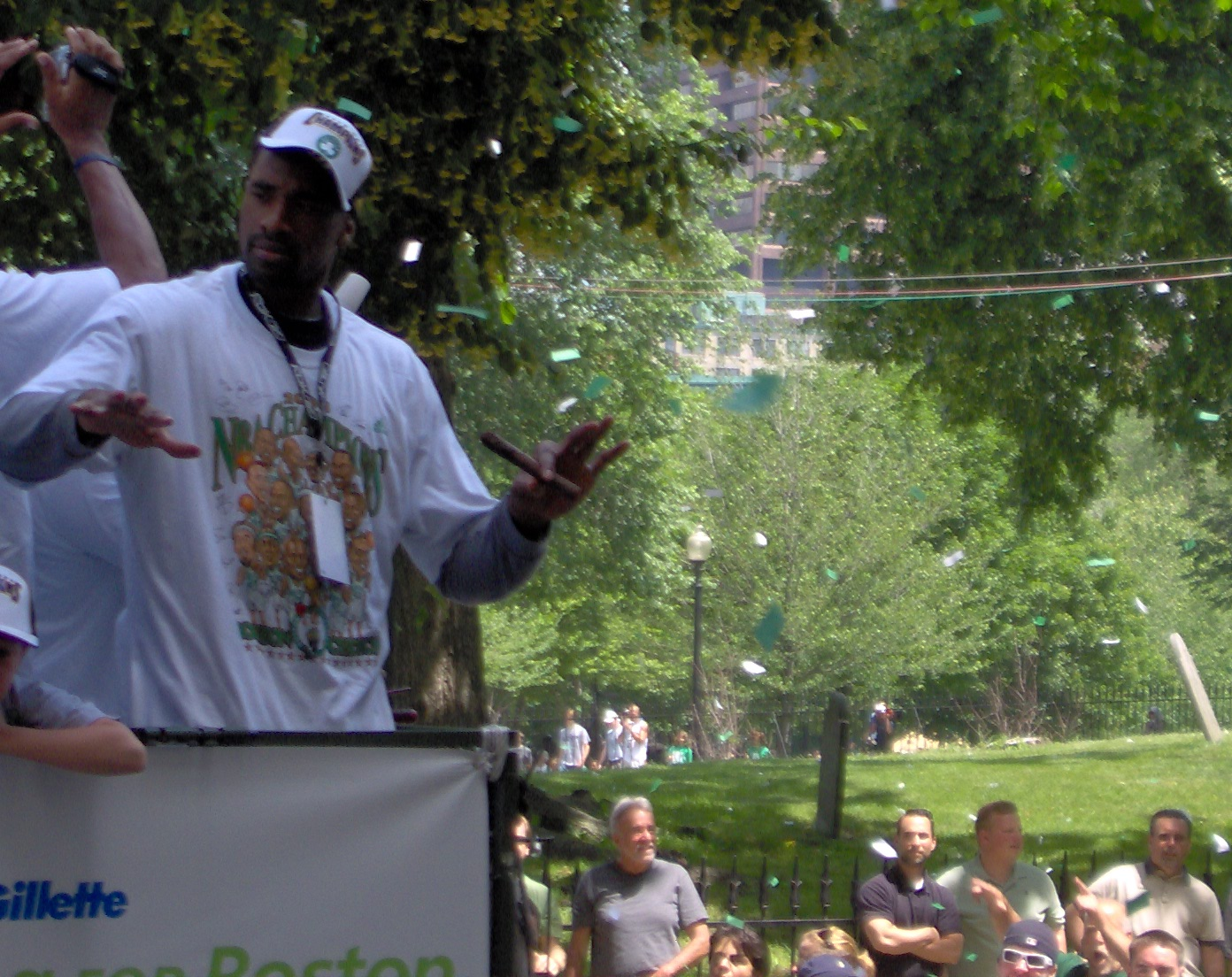
Powe during the 2008 Boston Celtics championship parade.

=== 2008–09 NBA season ===
On March 13, 2009, Powe started in place of the injured Kevin Garnett, scoring a career-high 30 points, grabbing 11 rebounds and blocking a career-high 5 shots, in a 102–92 Celtics victory over the Memphis Grizzlies.

Powe spent the end of the season attempting to recover from a right knee strain. He returned in time for the playoffs, only to tear the ACL and meniscus in his left knee in Game 2 of the first round against the Chicago Bulls. Powe continued to play on the torn ACL for three minutes before being taken out. His season ended with the knee injury, and had successful surgery to repair the injury on May 5, 2009. On August 2, the Cleveland Cavaliers offered Powe an offer sheet worth two years and $1.8 million. On August 11, 2009, Powe and the Cavaliers agreed in principle to the deal with an option on the second year. On August 12, 2009, he officially signed the deal.

=== 2010–11 NBA season ===
On February 24, 2011, Powe was waived when the Cleveland Cavaliers needed to clear their roster capacity after making two trades. He had just recovered from surgery to repair the torn meniscus in his right knee which had kept him sidelined for six weeks. Over a week later, Powe signed for the rest of the season with the Memphis Grizzlies.

== Basketball post-career ==
In 2014, Powe was hired by the Celtics as community ambassador.

== NBA career statistics ==
Legend
GP	Games played	GS	Games started	MPG	Minutes per game
FG%	Field goal percentage	3P%	3-point field goal percentage	FT%	Free throw percentage
RPG	Rebounds per game	APG	Assists per game	SPG	Steals per game
BPG	Blocks per game	PPG	Points per game	**Bold**	Career high
†	Won an NBA championship

=== Regular season ===
Year	Team	GP	GS	MPG	FG%	3P%	FT%	RPG	APG	SPG	BPG	PPG
2006–07	Boston	63	2	11.4	.446	.000	**.736**	3.4	.2	.2	.3	4.2
2007–08†	Boston	56	5	14.4	**.572**	.000	.710	4.1	.3	.3	.3	**7.9**
2008–09	Boston	**70**	**7**	**17.5**	.524	.000	.689	**4.9**	**.7**	.3	**.5**	7.7
2009–10	Cleveland	20	2	11.8	.429	.000	.587	3.0	.0	.3	.1	4.0
2010–11	Cleveland	14	3	13.4	.492	.000	.462	2.7	.1	**.5**	.2	5.0
2010–11	Memphis	16	0	8.8	.500	.000	.609	1.6	.3	.2	.1	5.5
Career		239	19	13.9	.515	.000	.682	3.8	.3	.3	.3	6.2

=== Playoffs ===
Year	Team	GP	GS	MPG	FG%	3P%	FT%	RPG	APG	SPG	BPG	PPG
2008†	Boston	**23**	**1**	11.7	**.493**	.000	.667	2.7	**.2**	.0	**.1**	**5.0**
2009	Boston	2	0	**12.0**	.429	.000	.667	**4.5**	.0	.0	.0	**5.0**
2010	Cleveland	3	0	3.0	.250	.000	**.750**	.7	.0	.0	.0	1.7
2011	Memphis	4	0	3.5	.250	.000	**.750**	1.0	.0	.0	.0	1.8
Career		32	1	9.9	.457	.000	.675	2.4	.1	.0	.1	4.3
