= Kevin Eastman (basketball) =

American basketball player-coach

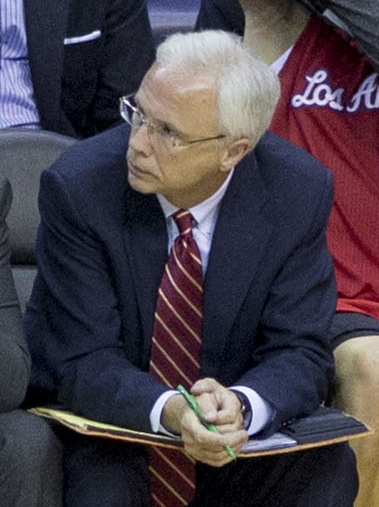
- Eastman in 2013

Personal information
- Born: April 7, 1955 (age 71) New Brunswick, New Jersey, U.S.

Career information
- High school: Haddonfield Memorial (Haddonfield, New Jersey)
- College: Richmond (1973–1977)
- NBA draft: 1977: undrafted
- Coaching career: 1978–2014

Career history

Playing
- 1978: Richmond Virginians

Coaching
- 1978–1980: Richmond (assistant)
- 1980–1983: Colorado State (assistant)
- 1983–1985: VCU (assistant)
- 1985–1986: Richmond (assistant)
- 1986–1989: Belmont Abbey
- 1989–1990: Tulsa (assistant)
- 1990–1994: UNC Wilmington
- 1994–1999: Washington State
- 2004–2005, 2006–2013: Boston Celtics (assistant)
- 2013–2016: Los Angeles Clippers (assistant)

Career highlights
- As assistant coach: NBA champion (2008)

Kevin Eastman (born April 7, 1955) is an American former basketball coach. He was assistant coach and Vice President for Basketball Operations of the Los Angeles Clippers of the NBA. Eastman joined the Clippers' coaching staff before the 2013–14 season.

== Early life ==
Born in New Brunswick, New Jersey, Eastman grew up in Haddonfield, New Jersey and graduated from Haddonfield Memorial High School in 1973.

== Playing career ==
Eastman then attended the University of Richmond and played on the Richmond Spiders men's basketball team from 1973 to 1977. Eastman was a two-time team captain and a three-year starter, and scored 1,162 points. He is also a member of the university's athletic hall of fame. In early 1978, Eastman played professionally for the Richmond Virginians of the All-American Basketball Alliance (AABA). In 11 games, Eastman averaged 9.2 points.

== Coaching career ==
Prior to joining the Clippers, Eastman served as the assistant coach to Doc Rivers for the Boston Celtics from the 2004–05 season until the 2012–13 season, including winning the NBA Championship in 2008.

He was Nike Basketball's National Director of Skills in 2003–04, and spent 2002–03 as athletic director at Randolph–Macon College. Eastman spent five years (1994–1999) as head men's basketball coach at Washington State University and four years (1990–1994) as head coach at UNC Wilmington. In addition, he held assistant coaching positions at the University of Tulsa, Virginia Commonwealth University, Colorado State University and his alma mater, the University of Richmond.

== Executive career ==
On June 16, 2014, the Clippers restructured the basketball operations. Eastman became vice-president for Basketball Operations. He announced his retirement from basketball on June 13, 2016.

== Head coaching record ==
Record table
Season	Team	Overall	Conference	Standing	Postseason
Belmont Abbey Crusaders (NAIA District 26) (1986–1989)
1986–87	Belmont Abbey	23–6	18–4	1st	
1987–88	Belmont Abbey	22–9	14–4	1st	NAIA Division I First Round
1988–89	Belmont Abbey	20–7	13–5	1st	
Belmont Abbey:		65–22	45–13		
UNC Wilmington Seahawks (Colonial Athletic Association) (1990–1994)
1990–91	UNC Wilmington	11–17	6–8	T–5th	
1991–92	UNC Wilmington	13–15	6–8	5th	
1992–93	UNC Wilmington	17–11	6–8	T–4th	
1993–94	UNC Wilmington	18–10	9–5	3rd	
UNC Wilmington:		59–53	27–29		
Washington State Cougars (Pacific-10 Conference) (1994–1999)
1994–95	Washington State	18–12	10–8	T–5th	NIT Quarterfinal
1995–96	Washington State	17–12	8–10	6th	NIT Second Round
1996–97	Washington State	13–17	5–13	8th	
1997–98	Washington State	10–19	3–15	10th	
1998–99	Washington State	10–19	4–14	10th	
Washington State:		68–79	30–60		
Total:		192–154			
National champion Postseason invitational champion Conference regular season champion Conference regular season and conference tournament champion Division regular season champion Division regular season and conference tournament champion Conference tournament champion
