= 2007–08 Boston Celtics season =

Season of National Basketball Association team the Boston Celtics

- NBA champions
- Conference champions
- Division champions
- Head coach: Doc Rivers
- General manager: Danny Ainge
- Owners: Boston Basketball Partners L.L.C.
- Arena: TD Banknorth Garden

Results
- Record: 66–16 (.805)
- Place: Division: 1st (Atlantic); Conference: 1st (Eastern)
- Playoff finish: NBA champions (Defeated Lakers 4–2)
- Stats at Basketball Reference

Local media
- Television: CSN New England
- Radio: WEEI

The 2007–08 Boston Celtics season was the 62nd season of the Boston Celtics in the National Basketball Association (NBA). Powered by the offseason blockbuster acquisitions of perennial All-Stars Kevin Garnett and Ray Allen to join with established star Paul Pierce, known as the Big Three, the trade enabled the Celtics to finish the season with a record of 66–16 in addition to posting the best single-season turnaround in NBA history. The team also finished first in both the Atlantic Division and the Eastern Conference, and achieved the league's best record. The 66 wins were also the third-most in franchise history, behind the 1972–73 Celtics’ 68 wins and the famous 1985–86 Celtics’ 67 wins including 40 at home. Kevin Garnett was named NBA Defensive Player of the Year, while Danny Ainge, who executed "the most dramatic NBA turnaround ever", was named NBA Executive of the Year. The Celtics also sold out all 41 regular-season home games. The Celtics had the tenth best team offensive rating and the best team defensive rating in the NBA.

Their two-year absence from the playoffs came to an end as they met the Atlanta Hawks in the first round of the 2008 NBA Playoffs. Eventually, they advanced to the NBA Finals for the first time since 1987, where they met the Los Angeles Lakers, reigniting their storied rivalry. The Celtics won 4–2, capturing their first championship since 1986, and seventeenth in franchise history, the most in NBA history. However, they had a far more difficult path to this championship, playing 26 games, the most any team had ever played in a post-season; the Celtics surpassed the previous record of 25 games which was held by the 2004-2005 Detroit Pistons and 1993-1994 New York Knicks.

This was the last time the Celtics won an NBA championship until the 2023–24 season.

== Key dates ==
- June 28: The 2007 NBA draft took place in New York City; acquired perennial All-Star Ray Allen.
- July 1: The free agency period started.
- July 31: Acquired perennial All-Star Kevin Garnett.
- October 6: The pre-season started with a game against the Toronto Raptors in Rome as part of the 2007 NBA Europe Live Tour.
- November 2: The regular season started with a game against the Washington Wizards.
- December 27: Matched their victory total of the previous season with a win against the Seattle SuperSonics.
- March 5: First team to clinch a playoff berth for the 2008 NBA Playoffs.
- March 10: Won 50 games in a season for the first time since 1991–92 with a win against the Philadelphia 76ers.
- March 14: Clinched the Atlantic Division title despite a loss to the Utah Jazz.
- March 18: Ended the 3rd longest winning streak in NBA history with a win against the Houston Rockets.
- March 28: Matched the number of wins of the previous two season combined (57) with a win against the New Orleans Hornets.
- April 2: Won sixty games in a season for the first time since 1985–86 with a win against the Indiana Pacers.
- April 5: Clinched the best record in the Eastern Conference, and simultaneously home-court advantage throughout the 2008 Playoffs, with a win against the New Orleans Hornets.
- April 16: The regular season concluded with a game against the New Jersey Nets.
- May 4: Advanced to the Eastern Conference semifinals with a win in Game 7 of the First round against the Atlanta Hawks.
- May 18: Advanced to the Eastern Conference finals with a win in Game 7 of the Eastern Conference semifinals against the Cleveland Cavaliers.
- May 30: Advanced to the NBA Finals for the first time since 1987 with a win in Game 6 of the Eastern Conference finals against the Detroit Pistons.
- June 17: Captured their 17th NBA Championship with a win in Game 6 of the NBA Finals against the Los Angeles Lakers. Paul Pierce was named the Finals MVP.

== Summary ==
=== NBA draft 2007: The Ray Allen trade ===
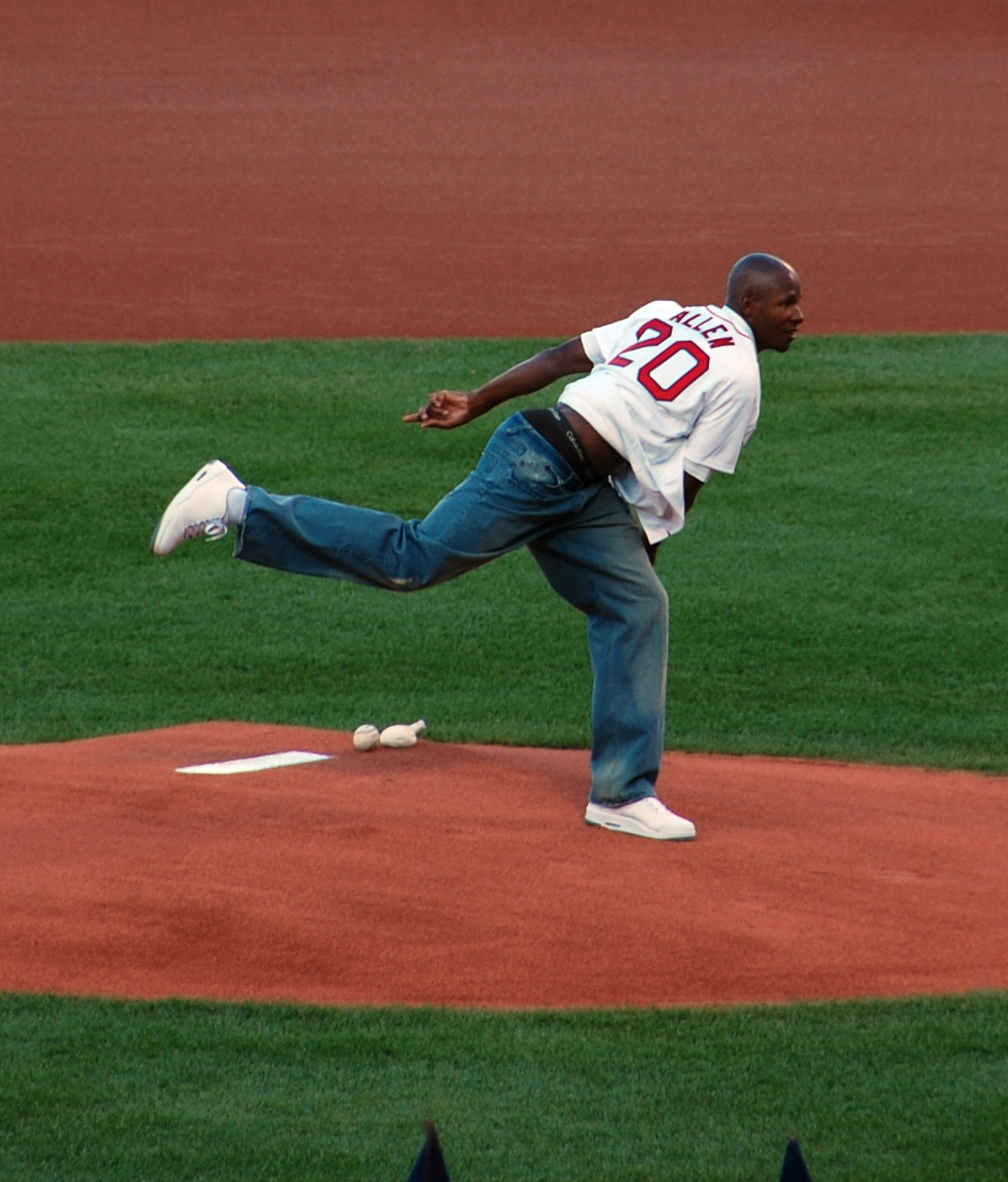
Shortly after being traded to the Celtics, Ray Allen threw out the first pitch for a baseball game at Fenway Park, home of the Boston Red Sox of Major League Baseball.

On May 22, the Celtics were assigned the 5th overall selection in the NBA draft lottery, essentially losing their chance of drafting either Greg Oden or Kevin Durant, who both were considered to go 1st and 2nd in the draft. The 5th pick was the worst-case scenario for the Celtics, who had a 19.9% chance of obtaining the 1st overall selection. However, on June 28, the day of the 2007 NBA draft, the Celtics traded the 5th pick along with Wally Szczerbiak and Delonte West to the Seattle SuperSonics in exchange for All-Star 3-point specialist Ray Allen and the 35th overall selection prior to the event, and with the 5th pick selected forward Jeff Green for Seattle. In the second round of the draft, the Celtics selected guard Gabe Pruitt with the 32nd pick, which was their own, and forward Glen "Big Baby" Davis with the 35th pick, previously obtained from Seattle.

=== Kevin Garnett trade ===
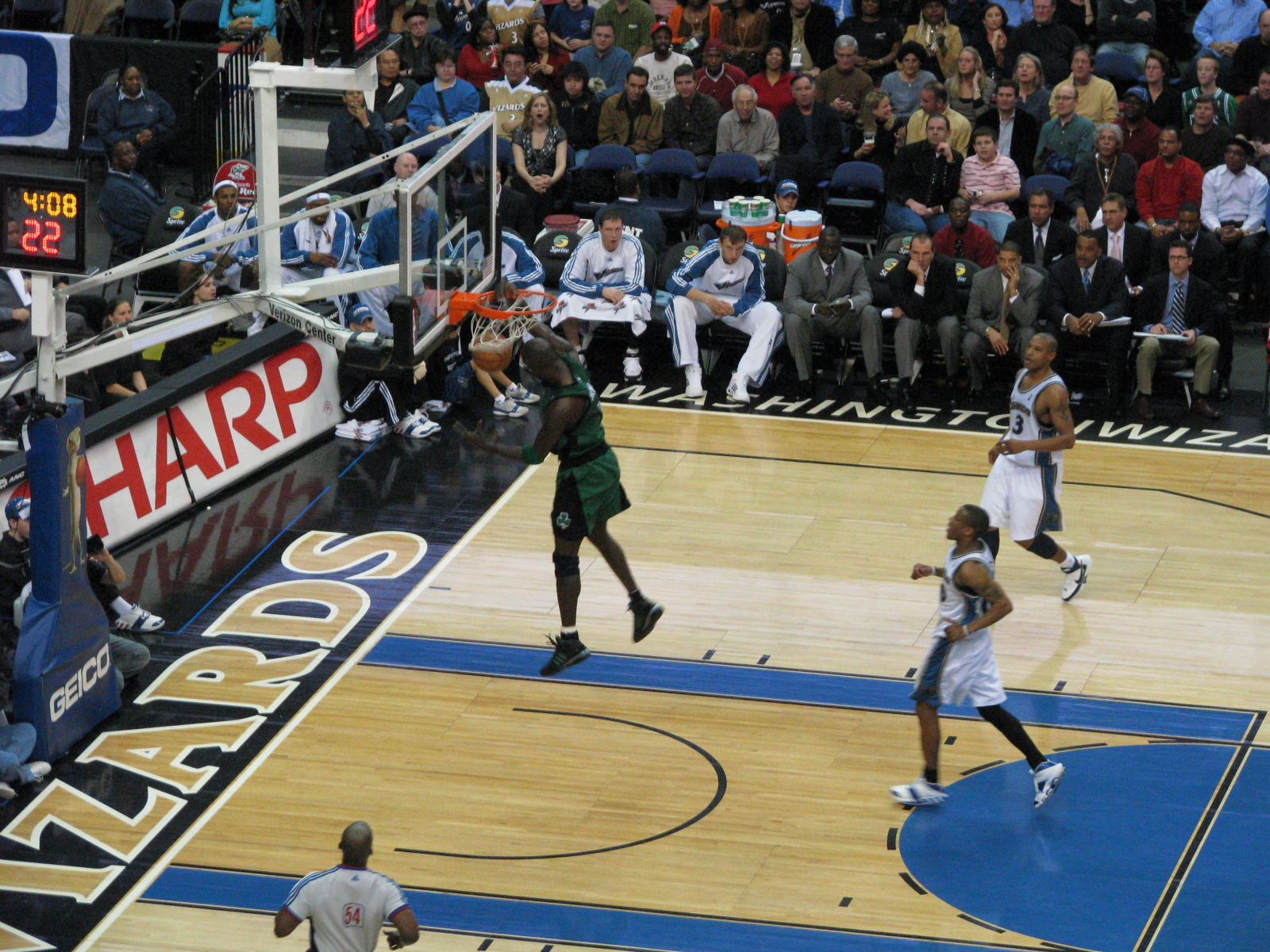
The Celtics achieved the league's top record via the acquisition of Kevin Garnett, who carried the team throughout the season and was amongst the leaders for the Most Valuable Player award.

On July 31, the Celtics traded for 10-time All-Star and 2004 MVP Kevin Garnett in the single largest trade for one player in NBA history. He was acquired from the Minnesota Timberwolves in exchange for Al Jefferson, Ryan Gomes, Theo Ratliff, Gerald Green, Sebastian Telfair, Boston's 2009 first-round draft pick (top three protected), the return of Minnesota's conditional first-round draft pick previously obtained in the 2006 Ricky Davis–Wally Szczerbiak trade and cash considerations. By adding Garnett to Celtics veteran Paul Pierce and perennial All-Star Ray Allen, the trade brought a new era of relevance to the long-struggling franchise, but it also left the roster short-handed.

=== Free agency ===
The Garnett trade left the roster depleted and depth became an immediate concern. Eventually, the Celtics signed guards Eddie House and Jackie Manuel on August 1, just two days after the Garnett trade, and center Scot Pollard on August 9. Later, Ainge called and asked 5-time All-Star Reggie Miller to return from his 2-year retirement and join the roster in a reserve role. Miller strongly considered the possibility of playing alongside Garnett, but ultimately announced on August 23 that he would not join the Celtics. On August 27, forward James Posey signed with the team and was considered a decisive signing which instantly gave the Celtics a drastic improvement to their bench.

On September 26, center Esteban Batista and guard Dahntay Jones signed non-guaranteed contracts with the Celtics, two days before the beginning of training camp and the team's departure to Rome for the 2007 NBA Europe Live Tour. Curiously, Jones was involved in a trade back in the 2003 NBA draft, in which the Celtics drafted him with the 20th overall selection, but immediately traded him with the 16th pick, Troy Bell, to the Memphis Grizzlies in exchange for the 13th pick, Marcus Banks, and the 27th pick, Kendrick Perkins. Ultimately, the Celtics waived Batista on October 16, and Manuel and Jones on October 25, bringing the roster down to 14 players, one shy of the league maximum of 15 players, in order to have roster flexibility and be able to sign another player midway through the season.

Later in the season, on December 18, the Celtics released yet another player, Brandon Wallace, in order to have even more roster flexibility that coach Doc Rivers said they needed. This move brought the roster down to only 13 players, which is the league minimum for players allowed on a team's roster. On February 27, the Celtics signed center P.J. Brown for the remainder of the season, in order to bolster their front court. His decision to come to Boston was strongly aided by a conversation with future teammates Ray Allen and Paul Pierce, who convinced him to sign with the Celtics during the 2008 NBA All-Star Weekend. On March 4, 2008, the Celtics officially announced that they had signed guard Sam Cassell. After the signing, Cassell immediately flew back to his hometown of Baltimore to attend funeral services for a deceased family member. This signing ultimately put the roster up to the league maximum of 15 players.

== Draft picks ==
Round	Pick	Player	Position	Nationality	College
1	5	Jeff Green	SF	United States	Georgetown
2	31	Gabe Pruitt	PG	United States	Southern California

The Celtics entered the draft with one first-round selection and one second-round selection. They used their first-round selection to draft Jeff Green, but soon traded his draft rights to the Seattle SuperSonics as an exchange for Ray Allen.

== Roster ==
2007–08 Boston Celtics roster
Players

Pos.	No.	Player	Height	Weight	DOB	From
G	20	Ray Allen	6 ft 5 in (1.96 m)	205 lb (93 kg)	1975-07-20	Connecticut
G	42	Tony Allen	6 ft 4 in (1.93 m)	213 lb (97 kg)	1982-01-11	Oklahoma State
F/C	93	P.J. Brown	6 ft 11 in (2.11 m)	239 lb (108 kg)	1969-10-14	Louisiana Tech
G	28	Sam Cassell	6 ft 3 in (1.91 m)	185 lb (84 kg)	1969-11-18	Florida State
F/C	11	Glen Davis	6 ft 9 in (2.06 m)	289 lb (131 kg)	1986-01-01	LSU
F/C	5	Kevin Garnett	6 ft 11 in (2.11 m)	220 lb (100 kg)	1976-05-19	Farragut Academy (IL)
G	50	Eddie House	6 ft 1 in (1.85 m)	175 lb (79 kg)	1978-05-14	Arizona State
C	43	Kendrick Perkins	6 ft 10 in (2.08 m)	264 lb (120 kg)	1984-11-10	Clifton J. Ozen HS (TX)
G/F	34	Paul Pierce	6 ft 7 in (2.01 m)	235 lb (107 kg)	1977-10-13	Kansas
C	66	Scot Pollard	6 ft 11 in (2.11 m)	278 lb (126 kg)	1975-02-12	Kansas
F	41	James Posey	6 ft 8 in (2.03 m)	217 lb (98 kg)	1977-01-13	Xavier
F/C	0	Leon Powe	6 ft 8 in (2.03 m)	240 lb (109 kg)	1984-01-22	California
G	13	Gabe Pruitt	6 ft 4 in (1.93 m)	170 lb (77 kg)	1986-04-19	USC
G	9	Rajon Rondo	6 ft 1 in (1.85 m)	171 lb (78 kg)	1986-02-22	Kentucky
F	44	Brian Scalabrine	6 ft 9 in (2.06 m)	235 lb (107 kg)	1978-03-18	USC

Coaches
Head coach
- Doc Rivers
Assistant(s)
- Kevin Eastman
- Armond Hill
- Mike Longabardi
- Clifford Ray
- Tom Thibodeau

Legend
- (DP) Unsigned draft pick
- (FA) Free agent
- (S) Suspended
- Injured

Roster
Updated: March 4, 2008

== Regular season ==
=== Standings ===
Atlantic Division	W	L	PCT	GB	Home	Road	Div
z-Boston Celtics	66	16	.805	–	35–6	31–10	14–2
x-Toronto Raptors	41	41	.500	25	25–16	16–25	10–6
x-Philadelphia 76ers	40	42	.488	26	22–19	18–23	7–9
New Jersey Nets	34	48	.415	32	21–20	13–28	4–12
New York Knicks	23	59	.280	43	15–26	8–33	5–11

Eastern Conference
#	Team	W	L	PCT	GB
1	z-Boston Celtics	66	16	.805	–
2	y-Detroit Pistons	59	23	.732	7
3	y-Orlando Magic	52	30	.634	14
4	x-Cleveland Cavaliers	45	37	.549	21
5	x-Washington Wizards	43	39	.524	23
6	x-Toronto Raptors	41	41	.500	25
7	x-Philadelphia 76ers	40	42	.488	26
8	x-Atlanta Hawks	37	45	.451	29
9	Indiana Pacers	36	46	.439	30
10	New Jersey Nets	34	48	.415	32
11	Chicago Bulls	33	49	.402	33
12	Charlotte Bobcats	32	50	.390	34
13	Milwaukee Bucks	26	56	.317	40
14	New York Knicks	23	59	.280	43
15	Miami Heat	15	67	.183	51

=== Game log ===
2007–08 game log
Total: 66–16 (home: 35–6; road: 31–10)
November: 13–2 (home: 8–0; road: 5–2)

Game	Date	Team	Score	High points	High rebounds	High assists	Location Attendance	Record
1	November 2	Washington	103–83	Pierce (28)	Garnett (20)	Garnett (5)	TD Banknorth Garden; 18,624	1–0
2	November 4	@ Toronto	98–95 (OT)	Allen (33)	Garnett (13)	Garnett, Pierce (6)	Air Canada Centre; 19,800	2–0
3	November 7	Denver	119–93	Pierce (26)	Garnett (13)	Garnett (7)	TD Banknorth Garden; 18,624	3–0
4	November 9	Atlanta	106–83	Garnett (27)	Garnett (19)	Rondo (7)	TD Banknorth Garden; 18,624	4–0
5	November 10	@ New Jersey	112–101	Pierce (28)	Garnett (14)	Garnett (6)	Izod Center; 18,171	5–0
6	November 13	@ Indiana	101–86	Pierce (31)	Garnett, Pierce (11)	Pierce (6)	Conseco Fieldhouse; 12,143	6–0
7	November 14	New Jersey	91–69	Garnett (16)	Garnett, Perkins (8)	Allen (6)	TD Banknorth Garden; 18,624	7–0
8	November 16	Miami	92–91	Garnett (26)	Garnett (11)	Rondo (10)	TD Banknorth Garden; 18,624	8–0
9	November 18	@ Orlando	102–104	Pierce (28)	Garnett (11)	Pierce (6)	Amway Arena; 17,519	8–1
10	November 21	Golden State	105–82	Allen (21)	Garnett, Pierce (10)	Rondo (6)	TD Banknorth Garden; 18,624	9–1
11	November 23	L. A. Lakers	107–94	Garnett, Perkins (21)	Garnett (11)	Rondo (10)	TD Banknorth Garden; 18,624	10–1
12	November 24	@ Charlotte	96–95	Garnett, Pierce (23)	Garnett (11)	Pierce (7)	Charlotte Bobcats Arena; 19,201	11–1
13	November 27	@ Cleveland	104–109 (OT)	Allen (29)	Allen, Rondo (7)	Rondo (6)	Quicken Loans Arena; 20,562	11–2
14	November 29	New York	104–59	Allen, Pierce (21)	Garnett (11)	Rondo (7)	TD Banknorth Garden; 18,624	12–2
15	November 30	@ Miami	95–85	Pierce (27)	Garnett (9)	Rondo (6)	American Airlines Arena; 20,022	13–2

December: 13–1 (home: 6–1; road: 7–0)

Game	Date	Team	Score	High points	High rebounds	High assists	Location Attendance	Record
16	December 2	Cleveland	80–70	Allen (20)	Garnett (8)	Allen, Garnett, House, Pierce (3)	TD Banknorth Garden; 18,624	14–2
17	December 5	@ Philadelphia	113–103	Garnett (22)	Garnett (7)	Pierce (12)	Wachovia Center; 15,779	15–2
18	December 7	Toronto	112–84	Garnett (23)	Posey (10)	Rondo (7)	TD Banknorth Garden; 18,624	16–2
19	December 8	@ Chicago	92–81	Allen (21)	Davis (12)	Pierce (7)	United Center; 22,778	17–2
20	December 12	Sacramento	90–78	Pierce (26)	Davis (9)	Rondo (5)	TD Banknorth Garden; 18,624	18–2
21	December 14	Milwaukee	104–82	Pierce (32)	Garnett (7)	Rondo (8)	TD Banknorth Garden; 18,624	19–2
22	December 16	@ Toronto	90–77	Pierce (18)	Garnett (8)	Garnett (6)	Air Canada Centre; 19,800	20–2
23	December 19	Detroit	85–87	Garnett (26)	Garnett (12)	Rondo (7)	TD Banknorth Garden; 18,624	20–3
24	December 21	Chicago	107–82	Pierce (22)	Garnett, Pierce, Rondo (7)	Garnett (5)	TD Banknorth Garden; 18,624	21–3
25	December 23	Orlando	103–91	Pierce (24)	Garnett, Perkins (12)	Pierce, Rondo (6)	TD Banknorth Garden; 18,624	22–3
26	December 26	@ Sacramento	89–69	Allen (17)	Garnett (10)	Pierce (6)	ARCO Arena; 17,317	23–3
27	December 27	@ Seattle	104–96	Pierce (37)	Garnett (14)	Rondo (5)	KeyArena; 17,072	24–3
28	December 29	@ Utah	104–98	Pierce (24)	Garnett, Perkins (9)	Rondo (7)	EnergySolutions Arena; 19,911	25–3
29	December 30	@ L. A. Lakers	110–91	Pierce (33)	Garnett (12)	Garnett (6)	Staples Center; 18,997	26–3

January: 10–5 (home: 6–3; road: 4–2)

Game	Date	Team	Score	High points	High rebounds	High assists	Location Attendance	Record
30	January 2	Houston	97–93	Garnett (26)	Garnett (9)	Rondo (9)	TD Banknorth Garden; 18,624	27–3
31	January 4	Memphis	100–96	Garnett, Pierce (23)	Pierce, Posey (10)	Allen, Garnett, Pierce (5)	TD Banknorth Garden; 18,624	28–3
32	January 5	@ Detroit	92–85	Davis (20)	Perkins, Pierce (9)	Pierce (7)	The Palace of Auburn Hills; 22,076	29–3
33	January 9	Charlotte	83–95	Garnett (24)	Perkins (10)	Garnett, Posey (4)	TD Banknorth Garden; 18,624	29–4
34	January 11	@ New Jersey	86–77	Garnett (20)	Garnett (11)	Pierce (5)	Izod Center; 20,049	30–4
35	January 12	@ Washington	78–85	Garnett (19)	Perkins (7)	Pierce (6)	Verizon Center; 20,173	30–5
36	January 14	Washington	83–88	Garnett (23)	Garnett (9)	Garnett (6)	TD Banknorth Garden; 18,624	30–6
37	January 16	Portland	100–90	Allen (35)	Pierce (8)	House, Pierce (5)	TD Banknorth Garden; 18,624	31–6
38	January 18	Philadelphia	116–89	Allen (23)	Perkins (7)	Garnett (8)	TD Banknorth Garden; 18,624	32–6
39	January 21	@ New York	109–93	Perkins (24)	Garnett (13)	Garnett, Pierce (7)	Madison Square Garden; 19,763	33–6
40	January 23	Toronto	112–114	Garnett (26)	Garnett (7)	Pierce (9)	TD Banknorth Garden; 18,624	33–7
41	January 25	Minnesota	87–86	Perkins (21)	Garnett (16)	Pierce (8)	TD Banknorth Garden; 18,624	34–7
42	January 27	@ Orlando	93–96	Pierce (24)	Pierce, Powe (9)	Rondo (5)	Amway Arena; 17,519	34–8
43	January 29	@ Miami	117–87	Powe (25)	Powe (11)	Allen (6)	American Airlines Arena; 19,600	35–8
44	January 31	Dallas	96–90	Allen, Pierce (26)	Rondo (12)	Rondo (4)	TD Banknorth Garden; 18,624	36–8

February: 9–4 (home: 5–0; road: 4–4)

Game	Date	Team	Score	High points	High rebounds	High assists	Location Attendance	Record
45	February 5	@ Cleveland	113–114	Allen (24)	Rondo (7)	Allen (5)	Quicken Loans Arena; 20,562	36–9
46	February 6	L. A. Clippers	111–100	Rondo (24)	Powe (10)	Rondo (8)	TD Banknorth Garden; 18,624	37–9
47	February 8	@ Minnesota	88–86	Pierce (18)	Powe (8)	Pierce (6)	Target Center; 19,511	38–9
48	February 10	San Antonio	98–90	Pierce (35)	Rondo (11)	Rondo (12)	TD Banknorth Garden; 18,624	39–9
49	February 12	@ Indiana	104–97	Pierce (28)	Pierce (12)	Rondo (7)	Conseco Fieldhouse; 13,603	40–9
50	February 13	New York	111–103	Pierce (24)	Posey (11)	Pierce (7)	TD Banknorth Garden; 18,624	41–9
All-Star Break
51	February 19	@ Denver	118–124	Pierce (24)	Powe (11)	Pierce (7)	Pepsi Center; 19,894	41–10
52	February 20	@ Golden State	117–119	Allen (32)	Garnett (15)	Allen, Rondo (6)	Oracle Arena; 20,711	41–11
53	February 22	@ Phoenix	77–85	Garnett (19)	Perkins, Pierce (6)	Garnett (4)	US Airways Center; 18,422	41–12
54	February 24	@ Portland	112–102	Pierce (30)	Garnett, Pierce (7)	Rondo (8)	Rose Garden; 20,554	42–12
55	February 25	@ L. A. Clippers	104–76	Pierce, Posey (17)	Perkins (9)	Allen (7)	Staples Center; 19,328	43–12
56	February 27	Cleveland	92–87	Allen (22)	Garnett (11)	Rondo (8)	TD Banknorth Garden; 18,624	44–12
57	February 29	Charlotte	108–100	Allen (23)	Garnett, Perkins (9)	Rondo (16)	TD Banknorth Garden; 18,624	45–12

March: 13–3 (home: 7–2; road: 6–1)

Game	Date	Team	Score	High points	High rebounds	High assists	Location Attendance	Record
58	March 2	Atlanta	98–88	Pierce (30)	Garnett (16)	Rondo (8)	TD Banknorth Garden; 18,624	46–12
59	March 5	Detroit	90–78	Garnett (31)	Perkins (20)	Allen, Pierce, Rondo (5)	TD Banknorth Garden; 18,624	47–12
60	March 7	Chicago	116–93	Pierce (22)	Perkins (11)	House, Pierce (5)	TD Banknorth Garden; 18,624	48–12
61	March 8	@ Memphis	119–89	Allen (23)	Perkins (11)	Rondo (9)	FedExForum; 18,119	49–12
62	March 10	@ Philadelphia	100–86	Garnett (26)	Garnett (12)	Rondo (8)	Wachovia Center; 20,438	50–12
63	March 12	Seattle	111–82	Allen, Garnett (18)	Allen (7)	Pierce (11)	TD Banknorth Garden; 18,624	51–12
64	March 14	Utah	92–110	Garnett (15)	Perkins (7)	Garnett (6)	TD Banknorth Garden; 18,624	51–13
65	March 15	@ Milwaukee	99–77	Garnett (19)	Brown (9)	Cassell (5)	Bradley Center; 17,626	52–13
66	March 17	@ San Antonio	93–91	Pierce (22)	Garnett, Pierce (8)	Pierce (5)	AT&T Center; 18,797	53–13
67	March 18	@ Houston	94–74	Garnett (22)	Garnett (11)	Pierce (5)	Toyota Center; 18,525	54–13
68	March 20	@ Dallas	94–90	Pierce (22)	Garnett, Pierce (13)	Cassell (6)	American Airlines Center; 20,582	55–13
69	March 22	@ New Orleans	106–113	Pierce (28)	Garnett (12)	Rondo (7)	New Orleans Arena; 18,280	55–14
70	March 24	Philadelphia	90–95	Garnett (18)	Powe (7)	Rondo (7)	TD Banknorth Garden; 18,624	55–15
71	March 26	Phoenix	117–97	Garnett (30)	Perkins (10)	Allen (8)	TD Banknorth Garden; 18,624	56–15
72	March 28	New Orleans	112–92	Pierce (27)	Garnett (13)	Pierce (9)	TD Banknorth Garden; 18,624	57–15
73	March 30	Miami	88–62	Powe (17)	Powe (13)	Garnett (5)	TD Banknorth Garden; 18,624	58–15

April: 8–1 (home: 3–0; road: 5–1)

Game	Date	Team	Score	High points	High rebounds	High assists	Location Attendance	Record
74	April 1	@ Chicago	106–92	Allen (22)	Perkins (9)	Rondo (10)	United Center; 22,225	59–15
75	April 2	Indiana	92–77	Garnett (20)	Garnett (11)	Rondo (6)	TD Banknorth Garden; 18,624	60–15
76	April 5	@ Charlotte	101–78	Powe (22)	Powe (9)	Rondo (5)	Charlotte Bobcats Arena; 19,403	61–15
77	April 8	@ Milwaukee	107–104 (OT)	Garnett (21)	Perkins (10)	Pierce (4)	Bradley Center; 15,921	62–15
78	April 9	@ Washington	95–109	Pierce (28)	Garnett (14)	Pierce, Rondo (7)	Verizon Center; 20,173	62–16
79	April 11	Milwaukee	102–86	Rondo (16)	Garnett, Posey (8)	Rondo (10)	TD Banknorth Garden; 18,624	63–16
80	April 12	@ Atlanta	99–89	Garnett (24)	Davis (10)	Cassell, Rondo (5)	Philips Arena; 20,098	64–16
81	April 14	@ New York	99–93	Rondo (23)	Rondo (10)	Rondo (5)	Madison Square Garden; 19,763	65–16
82	April 16	New Jersey	105–94	Powe (27)	Powe (11)	Cassell (4)	TD Banknorth Garden; 18,624	66–16

2007–08 season schedule

== Playoffs ==
Although the Celtics had the best record in the NBA with 66–16 in the regular season, their path to their first championship since 1986 was far from easy. They ended up playing the most games a team had ever played in a postseason, with 26, surpassing the 1994 New York Knicks, whom Celtics coach Doc Rivers played for, and the 2005 Detroit Pistons, each of whom played 25, but lost their respective finals in seven games. This record was set in Game 6 of the Finals, in which they won the championship.

2008 playoff game log
First Round: 4–3 (home: 4–0; road: 0–3)

Game	Date	Team	Score	High points	High rebounds	High assists	Location Attendance	Series
1	April 20	Atlanta	W 104–81	Ray Allen (18)	Kevin Garnett (10)	Rajon Rondo (9)	TD Banknorth Garden; 18,624	1–0
2	April 23	Atlanta	W 96–77	Kevin Garnett (19)	Kevin Garnett (10)	Rajon Rondo (8)	TD Banknorth Garden; 18,624	2–0
3	April 26	@ Atlanta	L 93–102	Kevin Garnett (32)	Kevin Garnett (10)	Paul Pierce (8)	Philips Arena; 19,725	2–1
4	April 28	@ Atlanta	L 92–97	Ray Allen (21)	Kevin Garnett (9)	Rajon Rondo (12)	Philips Arena; 20,016	2–2
5	April 30	Atlanta	W 110–85	Paul Pierce (22)	Paul Pierce (7)	Kevin Garnett (7)	TD Banknorth Garden; 18,624	3–2
6	May 2	@ Atlanta	L 100–103	Kevin Garnett (22)	Kevin Garnett (7)	Kevin Garnett (6)	Philips Arena; 20,425	3–3
7	May 4	Atlanta	W 99–65	Paul Pierce (22)	Kevin Garnett (11)	Rajon Rondo (6)	TD Banknorth Garden; 18,624	4–3

Conference Semifinals: 4–3 (home: 4–0; road: 0–3)

Game	Date	Team	Score	High points	High rebounds	High assists	Location Attendance	Series
1	May 6	Cleveland	W 76–72	Kevin Garnett (28)	Perkins (12)	Rajon Rondo (6)	TD Banknorth Garden; 18,624	1–0
2	May 8	Cleveland	W 89–73	Paul Pierce (19)	Kevin Garnett (12)	Rajon Rondo (6)	TD Banknorth Garden; 18,624	2–0
3	May 10	@ Cleveland	L 84–108	Kevin Garnett (17)	Kevin Garnett (9)	Paul Pierce (5)	Quicken Loans Arena; 20,562	2–1
4	May 12	@ Cleveland	L 77–88	three players tied (15)	Kevin Garnett (10)	Garnett, Rondo (4)	Quicken Loans Arena; 20,562	2–2
5	May 14	Cleveland	W 96–89	Paul Pierce (29)	Kevin Garnett (16)	Rajon Rondo (13)	TD Banknorth Garden; 18,624	3–2
6	May 16	@ Cleveland	L 69–74	Kevin Garnett (25)	Kevin Garnett (8)	Kevin Garnett (5)	Quicken Loans Arena; 20,562	3–3
7	May 18	Cleveland	W 97–92	Paul Pierce (41)	Kevin Garnett (13)	Rajon Rondo (8)	TD Banknorth Garden; 18,624	4–3

Conference Finals: 4–2 (home: 2–1; road: 2–1)

Game	Date	Team	Score	High points	High rebounds	High assists	Location Attendance	Series
1	May 20	Detroit	W 88–79	Kevin Garnett (26)	Kendrick Perkins (10)	Rajon Rondo (7)	TD Banknorth Garden; 18,624	1–0
2	May 22	Detroit	L 97–103	Paul Pierce (26)	Kevin Garnett (13)	Rajon Rondo (8)	TD Banknorth Garden; 18,624	1–1
3	May 24	@ Detroit	W 94–80	Kevin Garnett (22)	Kevin Garnett (13)	Ray Allen (6)	The Palace of Auburn Hills; 22,076	2–1
4	May 26	@ Detroit	L 75–94	Garnett, Pierce (16)	Kevin Garnett (10)	Rajon Rondo (4)	The Palace of Auburn Hills; 22,076	2–2
5	May 28	Detroit	W 106–102	Kevin Garnett (33)	Kendrick Perkins (16)	Rajon Rondo (13)	TD Banknorth Garden; 18,624	3–2
6	May 30	@ Detroit	W 89–81	Paul Pierce (27)	Paul Pierce (8)	Kevin Garnett (4)	The Palace of Auburn Hills; 22,076	4–2

NBA Finals: 4–2 (home: 3–0; road: 1–2)

Game	Date	Team	Score	High points	High rebounds	High assists	Location Attendance	Series
1	June 5	L.A. Lakers	W 98–88	Kevin Garnett (24)	Kevin Garnett (13)	Rajon Rondo (7)	TD Banknorth Garden; 18,624	1–0
2	June 8	L.A. Lakers	W 108–102	Paul Pierce (28)	Kevin Garnett (14)	Rajon Rondo (16)	TD Banknorth Garden; 18,624	2–0
3	June 10	@ L.A. Lakers	L 81–87	Ray Allen (25)	Kevin Garnett (12)	Kevin Garnett (5)	Staples Center; 18,997	2–1
4	June 12	@ L.A. Lakers	W 97–91	Paul Pierce (20)	Kevin Garnett (11)	Paul Pierce (7)	Staples Center; 18,997	3–1
5	June 15	@ L.A. Lakers	L 98–103	Paul Pierce (38)	Kevin Garnett (14)	Paul Pierce (8)	Staples Center; 18,997	3–2
6	June 17	L.A. Lakers	W 131–92	Garnett, Allen (26)	Kevin Garnett (14)	Paul Pierce (10)	TD Banknorth Garden; 18,624	4–2

2008 schedule

== Player statistics ==
Legend
GP	Games played	GS	Games started	MPG	Minutes per game
FG%	Field-goal percentage	3P%	3-point field-goal percentage	FT%	Free-throw percentage
RPG	Rebounds per game	APG	Assists per game	SPG	Steals per game
BPG	Blocks per game	PPG	Points per game

=== Season ===
Boston Celtics statistics
Player	GP	GS	MPG	FG%	3P%	FT%	RPG	APG	SPG	BPG	PPG
Ray Allen	73	73	35.9	.445	.398	.907	3.7	3.1	0.89	0.22	17.4
Tony Allen	75	11	18.3	.434	.316	.762	2.2	1.5	0.83	0.28	6.6
P. J. Brown	18	0	11.6	.341	.000	.688	3.8	0.6	0.28	0.44	2.2
Sam Cassell	17	1	17.6	.385	.409	.840	1.8	2.1	0.50	0.20	7.6
Glen Davis	69	1	13.6	.484	.000	.660	3.0	0.4	0.45	0.29	4.5
Kevin Garnett	71	71	32.8	.539	.000	.801	9.2	3.4	1.41	1.25	18.8
Eddie House	78	2	19.0	.409	.393	.917	2.1	1.9	0.76	0.13	7.5
Kendrick Perkins	78	78	24.5	.615	.000	.623	6.1	1.1	0.40	1.46	6.9
Paul Pierce	80	80	35.9	.464	.392	.843	5.1	4.5	1.26	0.45	19.6
Scot Pollard	22	0	7.9	.522	.000	.682	1.7	0.1	0.14	0.27	1.8
James Posey	74	2	24.6	.418	.380	.809	4.4	1.5	0.97	0.26	7.4
Leon Powe	56	5	14.4	.572	.000	.710	4.1	0.3	0.27	0.29	7.9
Gabe Pruitt	15	0	6.3	.359	.250	.500	0.5	0.9	0.33	0.00	2.1
Rajon Rondo	77	77	29.9	.492	.263	.611	4.2	5.1	1.68	0.17	10.6
Brian Scalabrine	48	9	10.7	.309	.326	.750	1.6	0.8	0.19	0.17	1.8

=== Playoffs ===
Boston Celtics statistics
Player	GP	GS	MPG	FG%	3P%	FT%	RPG	APG	SPG	BPG	PPG
Ray Allen	26	26	38.0	.428	.396	.913	3.8	2.7	0.92	0.31	15.6
Tony Allen	15	0	4.3	.563	.000	.400	0.2	0.2	0.13	0.00	1.3
P. J. Brown	25	0	13.6	.464	.000	.840	2.4	0.5	0.20	0.40	2.9
Sam Cassell	21	0	12.6	.333	.214	.824	0.7	1.2	0.38	0.05	4.5
Glen Davis	17	0	8.1	.412	.000	.611	1.5	0.4	0.29	0.24	2.3
Kevin Garnett	26	26	38.0	.495	.250	.810	10.5	3.3	1.35	1.12	20.4
Eddie House	21	0	7.9	.304	.355	.875	1.0	0.9	0.24	0.05	2.5
Kendrick Perkins	25	25	25.2	.585	.000	.678	6.1	0.5	0.60	1.28	6.6
Paul Pierce	26	26	38.1	.441	.361	.802	5.0	4.6	1.08	0.31	19.7
Scot Pollard	0	0	0.0	.000	.000	.000	0.0	0.0	0.00	0.00	0.0
James Posey	26	0	22.0	.437	.398	.875	3.6	1.1	1.00	0.31	6.7
Leon Powe	23	1	11.7	.493	.000	.667	2.7	0.2	0.00	0.13	5.0
Gabe Pruitt	0	0	0.0	.000	.000	.000	0.0	0.0	0.00	0.00	0.0
Rajon Rondo	26	26	32.0	.407	.250	.691	4.1	6.6	1.73	0.31	10.2
Brian Scalabrine	0	0	0.0	.000	.000	.000	0.0	0.0	0.00	0.00	0.0

== Awards, records and milestones ==
=== Awards ===
==== Week/Month ====
- Kevin Garnett was named Eastern Conference Player of the Week for games played from November 5 through November 11.
- Head coach Doc Rivers was named Eastern Conference Coach of the Month for games played in October and November.
- Paul Pierce was named Eastern Conference Player of the Week for games played from December 10 through December 16.
- Paul Pierce was named Eastern Conference Player of the Week for games played from December 24 through December 30.
- Kevin Garnett was named Eastern Conference Player of the Week for games played from March 17 through March 23.
- Head coach Doc Rivers was named Eastern Conference Coach of the Month for games played in March.
- Kevin Garnett was named Eastern Conference Player of the Week for games played from April 7 through April 13.
- Head coach Doc Rivers was named Eastern Conference Coach of the Month for games played in April.

==== All-Star ====
- Doc Rivers and the Celtics coaching staff earned the honor of coaching the Eastern Conference All-Stars for the 2008 NBA All-Star Game in New Orleans as a result of the Celtics' 109–93 victory over the New York Knicks on January 21. The win guaranteed that the Celtics would have the best record in the Eastern Conference as of February 3, the cutoff date for the selection.
- Kevin Garnett was voted as a starter for the 2008 NBA All-Star Game, leading all players in final votes received in the NBA All-Star Ballot with 2,399,148 votes, the 6th highest total in NBA All-Star Balloting history.
- Paul Pierce was named as a reserve for the 2008 NBA All-Star Game.
- Ray Allen was named by NBA Commissioner David Stern to replace injured East All-Star Caron Butler as a reserve for the 2008 NBA All-Star Game.
- Rajon Rondo was named to participate in the T-Mobile Rookie Challenge and Youth Jam.

==== Season ====
- Kevin Garnett was named NBA Defensive Player of the Year.
- Kevin Garnett was named to the All-NBA First Team.
- Paul Pierce was named to the All-NBA Third Team.
- Kevin Garnett was named to the NBA All-Defensive First Team.
- General manager Danny Ainge was named NBA Executive of the Year.
- Paul Pierce was named NBA Finals Most Valuable Player.

=== Records ===
==== Season ====
- Kevin Garnett joined a very short list of NBA players to record a 20 point, 20 rebound, 5 assist game in their first night with a new team, with the others being Charles Barkley, Kareem Abdul-Jabbar and Maurice Stokes, against the Washington Wizards on November 2.
- With an 8–0 season start, the Celtics were off to their best opening since winning 10 in a row to start the 1972–73 season.
- Kevin Garnett's streak of 410 consecutive games with double figures in points came to an end as he scored only 8 points in Boston's 104–59 blowout victory over the New York Knicks on November 29, 2007. This was the longest streak among active players and is good for 7th in NBA history, with Michael Jordan holding the record with 840 games.
- The Celtics marked their 6th biggest win in the history of the franchise and the biggest since a 153–107 victory over the Washington Wizards in the 1970–71 season with a 104–59 blowout victory over the New York Knicks on November 29, 2007. Their biggest win came against the Golden State Warriors in the 1961–62 season with a 153–102 victory.
- With a 12–0 season start at home, the Celtics matched their 2nd best home opening since winning 12 in a row to start the 1984–85 season. Their best home opening came in the 1957–58 season, when they started the season with 17 wins in a row.
- The Celtics matched their longest winning streak since the 1992–93 season, when they won 9 in a row from March 16 to 31, 1993, with a win against the Toronto Raptors on December 16.
- With a 20–2 start, the Celtics matched the best start in franchise history. The only other team to achieve that record was the 1963–64 Celtics.
- With a 27–3 start, the Celtics matched the best start through 30 games in NBA history. One of the other 5 teams to accomplish that record was the 1995–96 Chicago Bulls, who held the NBA record for most games won in a single season, with a record of 72–10, until 2016.
- Prior to their matchup on January 5, the Celtics and Pistons combined for the 3rd highest winning percentage (.844) in the shot clock era after at least 30 games.
- The Celtics matched their best start in the history of the franchise by reaching 30 wins after only 34 games.
- With a 34–7 start, the Celtics matched their best record at mid-season in the history of the franchise. The other 3 teams to achieve that record were the 1964–65, 1972–73 and 1984–85 Celtics.
- With a 16–0 start against the West, the Celtics were off to the 2nd best opening against teams from the other conference in NBA history. The only other team to accomplish that record was the 1971–72 Los Angeles Lakers, who won their first 19 games against Eastern Conference teams.
- With 16 assists against the New Orleans Hornets on February 29, Rajon Rondo had the most assists in a game by a Celtics player since Sherman Douglas had 18 on March 1, 1995.
- The Celtics won 10 straight games for the first time since the 1985–86 season, when they won 14 in a row from March 11 to April 4, 1986, with a win against the Seattle SuperSonics on March 12.
- The Celtics swept the Texas Triangle, consisting of the San Antonio Spurs, Houston Rockets and Dallas Mavericks, with a record of 3–0 in consecutive road games from March 17 through March 20, the first team to do it since the 2001–02 Sacramento Kings. It was the 4th sweep in franchise history, and the first since the 1986–87 season.
- With a 6–0 record against the Texas Triangle, the Celtics were the 13th team in NBA history to sweep the season series against each of the three teams, doing it for the 5th time in franchise history, and the first team since the 1999–2000 Milwaukee Bucks.
- The Celtics defeated every team in the league at least once for the first time since the 1990–91 season.
- The Celtics broke the record for the best single-season turnaround in franchise history by improving from 24 wins in 2006–07 to 66 wins in 2007–08, a total of 42 games. The previous record of 32 games was held by the 1979–80 Celtics, who improved from 29 to 61 wins.
- The Celtics broke the record for the best single-season turnaround in NBA history by improving from 24 wins in 2006–07 to 66 wins in 2007–08, a total of 42 games. The previous record of 36 games was held by the 1997–98 San Antonio Spurs, who improved from 20 to 56 wins.
- The Celtics set a franchise record for fewest free throws attempted and made, with 5 and 4.
- With 3 Eastern Conference Player of the Week awards, Kevin Garnett has had the most such awards in a single season by a Celtics player since Larry Bird had 4 in the 1985–86 season.
- The Celtics sold out all 41 home games with an average attendance of 18,624 and set a single-season attendance record of 763,584.

==== Playoffs ====
- Kevin Garnett has recorded a double-double in 16 straight playoff games dating back to the 2004 Playoffs. Shaquille O'Neal is the only active player with longer such streaks, with 19 and 22.
- The Celtics allowed a playoff low in franchise history in opponent score in a half by holding the Atlanta Hawks to 26 points in the first half of Game 7 in the First Round on May 4.
- Ray Allen's streak of 852 consecutive games with points scored came to an end as he went scoreless in Game 1 of the Conference semifinals against the Cleveland Cavaliers on May 6.
- Rajon Rondo was the first Celtics player to record at least 12 assists twice in one postseason since Danny Ainge did it in the 1988 Playoffs.
- With 41 points in the Conference semifinals against the Cleveland Cavaliers on May 18, Paul Pierce recorded the 2nd highest point total in franchise history in a Game 7.
- Paul Pierce and LeBron James combined for the 2nd highest point total (86) in NBA history in a Game 7 on May 18.
- The Celtics tied the record for the most consecutive road losses (6) in the playoffs in NBA history with a loss in Game 6 of the Conference semifinals against the Cleveland Cavaliers on May 16.
- The Celtics were held to the 2nd fewest field goals (21) in a Conference finals or NBA Finals game in the shot clock era in Game 4 of the Conference finals against the Detroit Pistons on May 26.
- The Celtics became the 4th team in NBA history to be tied at 2–2 in each of the first three playoff series.
- The Celtics tied the record for the most home wins (12) in the playoffs in NBA history with a win in Game 2 of the NBA Finals against the Los Angeles Lakers on June 8.
- The Celtics broke the record for playoff games (26) and home wins (13), and tied the record for most road losses (9) in a single postseason.

==== Finals ====
- With 21 points in Game 2 on June 8, Leon Powe recorded the 4th highest point total by a Celtic reserve since the 1970 Finals.
- With 16 assists in Game 2 on June 8, Rajon Rondo had the most assists in a Finals game since Magic Johnson had 20 on June 20, 1991.
- The Celtics recorded the 2nd best turnaround in Finals history in a game after halftime since the 1948 Finals after overcoming an 18-point deficit in Game 4 on June 12.
- Ray Allen was the first player to play all 48 minutes in an NBA Finals game since Jason Kidd did it in the 2003 Finals.
- With 38 points in Game 5 on June 15, Paul Pierce recorded the 3rd highest point total in franchise history in an NBA Finals game.
- With 7 three-pointers in Game 6 on June 17, Ray Allen tied the record for three-pointers made in an NBA Finals game.
- With 22 three-pointers, Ray Allen broke the record for three-pointers made in an NBA Finals series, eclipsing the previous record of 17 by Dan Majerle and Derek Harper.
- With 52 three-pointers, the Celtics broke the record for three-pointers made in an NBA Finals series.
- The Celtics became the 1st team to win an NBA Championship after finishing with a winning percentage below .450 in the previous season since the Portland Trail Blazers did it in 1977.
- The Celtics became the 1st team to score at least 130 points in an NBA Finals game since the Los Angeles Lakers defeated the Celtics 141–122 in the 1987 Finals.
- Kevin Garnett became the 8th player to record a double-double throughout a Finals series, joining Bob Pettit, Elgin Baylor, Wilt Chamberlain, Kareem Abdul-Jabbar, Bill Walton, Moses Malone and Shaquille O'Neal.
- Kevin Garnett and Paul Pierce became the 2nd pair of teammates each to score 500 points in a single postseason, with 530 and 511 points, respectively.
- With 39 points in Game 6 on June 17, the Celtics broke the record for largest margin of victory in a title clinching game, and 2nd largest margin in an NBA Finals game.
- With 17 steals in Game 6 on June 17, the Celtics broke the record for steals in an NBA Finals game.

=== Milestones ===
- Paul Pierce moved up to 6th on Boston's all-time scoring list by passing Sam Jones with a layup in the third quarter against the Toronto Raptors on November 4.
- Ray Allen passed 17,000 points for his career with his first of two 3-pointers in overtime against the Toronto Raptors on November 4.
- Paul Pierce became the 9th player in Celtics history to play over 25,000 minutes against the Los Angeles Lakers on November 23.
- Ray Allen passed 30,000 minutes for his career and became 103rd in minutes in NBA history against the Los Angeles Lakers on November 23.
- Kevin Garnett moved up to 35th in points in NBA history by passing Walter Davis with a jumper in the second quarter against the Sacramento Kings on December 26.
- Kevin Garnett moved up to 26th in rebounds in NBA history by passing Jack Sikma with a rebound in the second quarter against the Seattle SuperSonics on December 27.
- Ray Allen passed 2,000 three-point field goals for his career with a 3-pointer in the fourth quarter against the Portland Trail Blazers on January 16.
- Kevin Garnett moved up to 23rd in blocks in NBA history by passing Vlade Divac with a block in the second quarter against the Washington Wizards on January 12.
- Kevin Garnett passed 11,000 rebounds for his career with a rebound in the fourth quarter against the Cleveland Cavaliers on February 27.
- Kevin Garnett passed 20,000 points for his career, becoming the 32nd player in NBA history to achieve that mark, with a layup in the second quarter against the Memphis Grizzlies on March 8. At the time, the only other active players who passed that mark were Shaquille O'Neal, Allen Iverson and Kobe Bryant.
- Ray Allen passed 18,000 points for his career with a 3-pointer in the third quarter against the Memphis Grizzlies on March 8.
- Kevin Garnett moved up to 25th in rebounds in NBA history by passing Bill Bridges with a rebound in the third quarter against the Philadelphia 76ers on March 10.
- Kevin Garnett moved up to 31st in points in NBA history by passing Tom Chambers with a layup in the third quarter against the Seattle SuperSonics on March 12.

== Transactions ==
=== Trades ===
June 28, 2007	To Boston Celtics Ray Allen, and the 35th pick in the 2007 NBA draft (Glen Davis)	To Seattle SuperSonics Delonte West, Wally Szczerbiak, and the 5th pick in the 2007 NBA draft (Jeff Green)

July 31, 2007	To Boston Celtics Kevin Garnett	To Minnesota Timberwolves Al Jefferson, Ryan Gomes, Theo Ratliff, Gerald Green, Sebastian Telfair, Boston's 2009 1st round pick, and Minnesota's own conditional 1st round pick

=== Free agents ===
==== Additions ====
Player	Signed	Former team
Brandon Wallace	July 10	Brooklyn Nets
Eddie House	August 1	Los Angeles Clippers
Scot Pollard	August 9	Detroit Pistons
James Posey	August 27	Miami Heat
Esteban Batista	September 26	Dallas Mavericks
Dahntay Jones	September 26	Los Angeles Clippers
P.J. Brown	February 27	New Orleans Hornets
Sam Cassell	March 4	Los Angeles Clippers

==== Subtractions ====
Player	Left	New team
Michael Olowokandi	July 1	Houston Rockets
Allan Ray	July 27	Miami Heat
Esteban Batista	October 16	Dallas Mavericks
Dahntay Jones	October 25	Los Angeles Clippers
Jackie Manuel	October 25	Iowa Energy
Brandon Wallace	December 18	New Jersey Nets

== See also ==
- 2007–08 NBA season
