= List of African American sportspeople =

This is a list of notable African American sportspeople. For other African Americans, see Lists of African Americans.

== Administrators, executives, and businesspeople ==
- Katrina Adams, current president of the United States Tennis Association
- Koby Altman, current General manager of the Cleveland Cavaliers
- Anucha Browne Sanders, former executive of the New York Knicks
- Pinball Clemons, current vice-chairman for the Toronto Argonauts
- Dell Demps, current vice president and general manager of the New Orleans Pelicans
- Joe Dumars, former President of Basketball Operations of the Detroit Pistons
- Wayne Embry, first African-American General manager and team president in NBA history, 2x NBA Executive of the Year
- Rube Foster, former executive of the Chicago American Giants
- Rod Higgins, former president of Basketball Operations for the Charlotte Bobcats
- Billy Hunter, former executive director of the National Basketball Players Association
- Al Haymon, manager and adviser to Floyd Mayweather Jr.
- Michael Huyghue, former Commissioner of the United Football League
- Stu Jackson, former executive vice president of the National Basketball Association, current associate Commissioner of the Big East Conference
- Magic Johnson, current president of Basketball Operations for the Los Angeles Lakers, part-owner of the Los Angeles Dodgers, owner of the Los Angeles Sparks, and co-owner of the Los Angeles Football Club
- Michael Jordan, current principal owner and chairman of the Charlotte Hornets
- Billy King, former general manager of the Brooklyn Nets
- Don King, former boxing promoter
- Billy Knight, former general manager and executive vice president of the Atlanta Hawks
- Billy McKinney, former vice president of Basketball Operations for the Detroit Pistons, Executive vice president for both Seattle SuperSonics and Seattle Storm
- Steve Mills, current executive of the New York Knicks
- Ozzie Newsome, current general manager of the Baltimore Ravens
- Jerry Reese, former general manager of the New York Giants

== Baseball ==
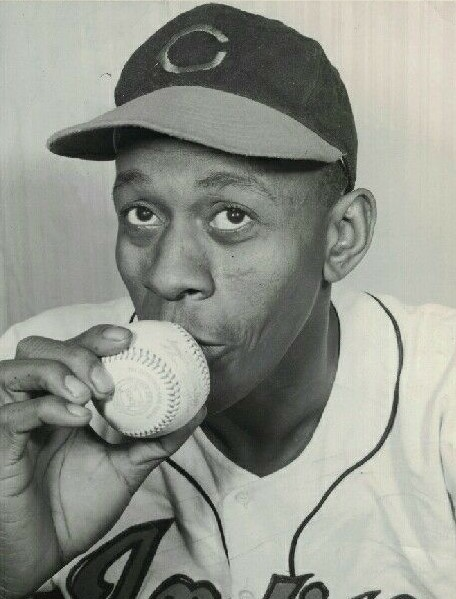
Satchel Paige

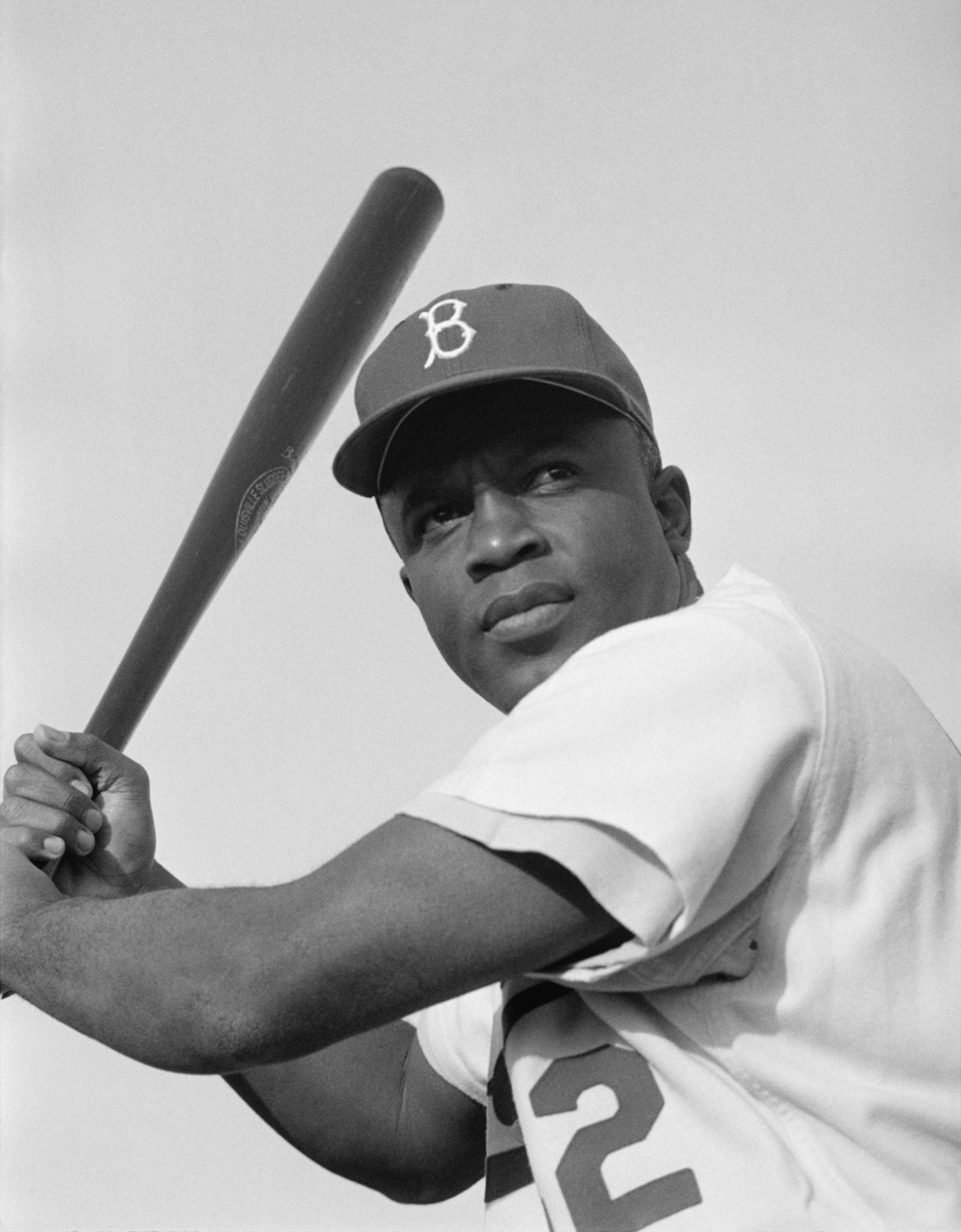
Jackie Robinson

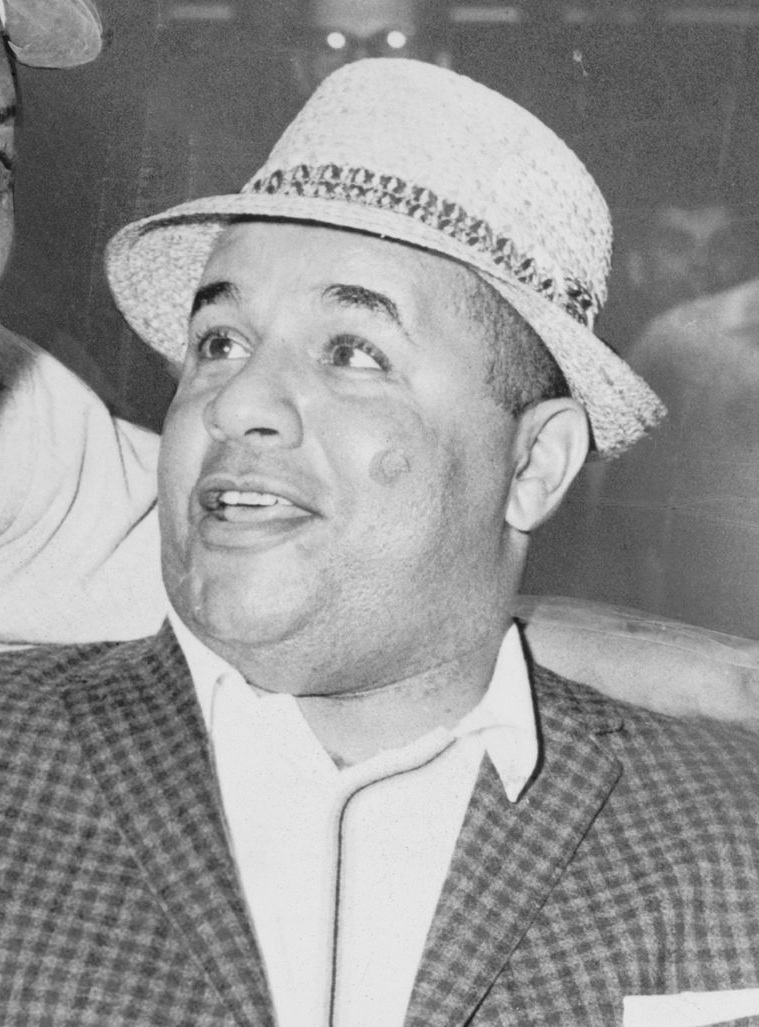
Roy Campanella

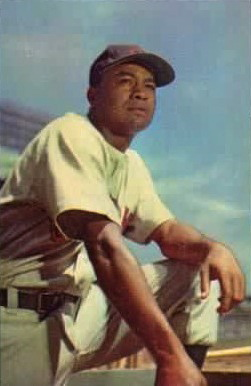
Larry Doby

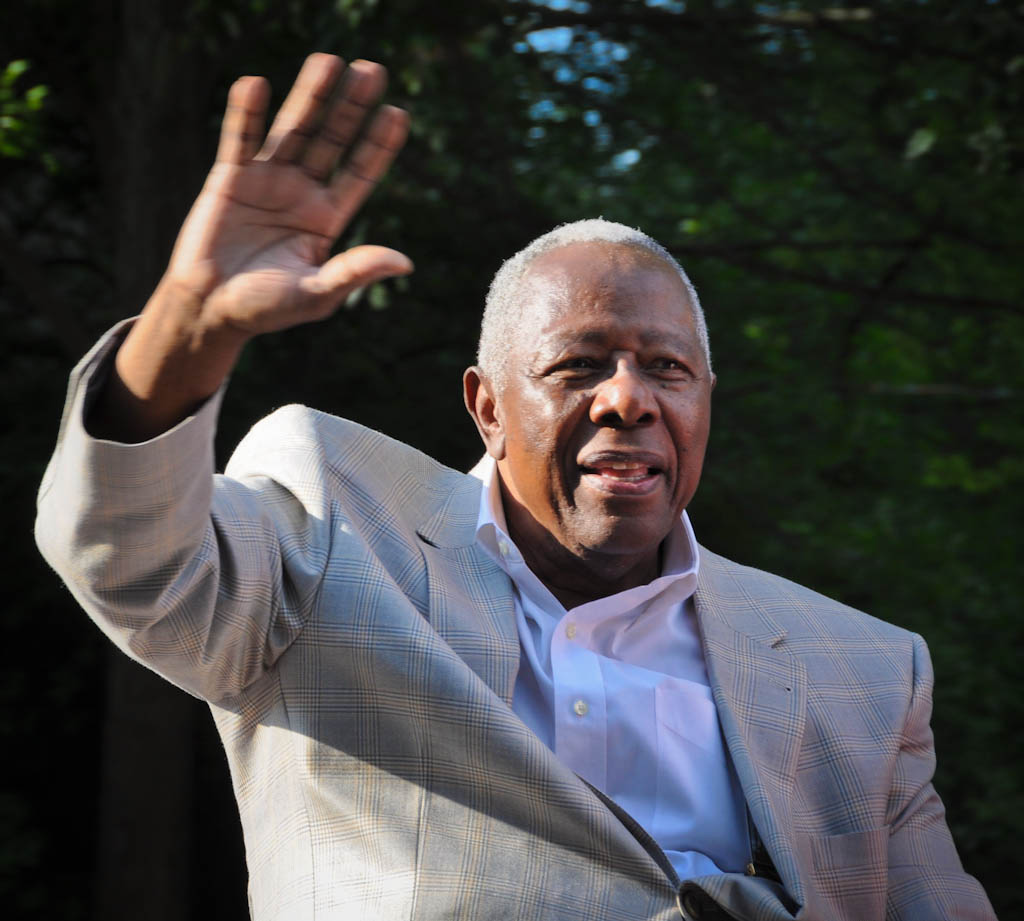
Hank Aaron

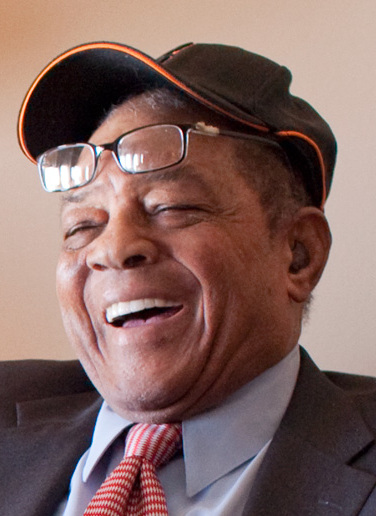
Willie Mays

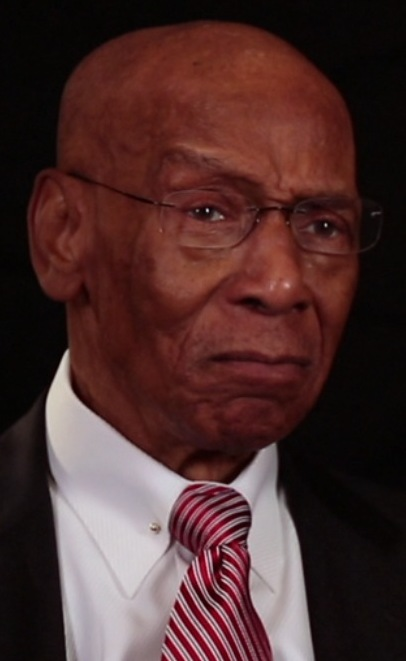
Ernie Banks

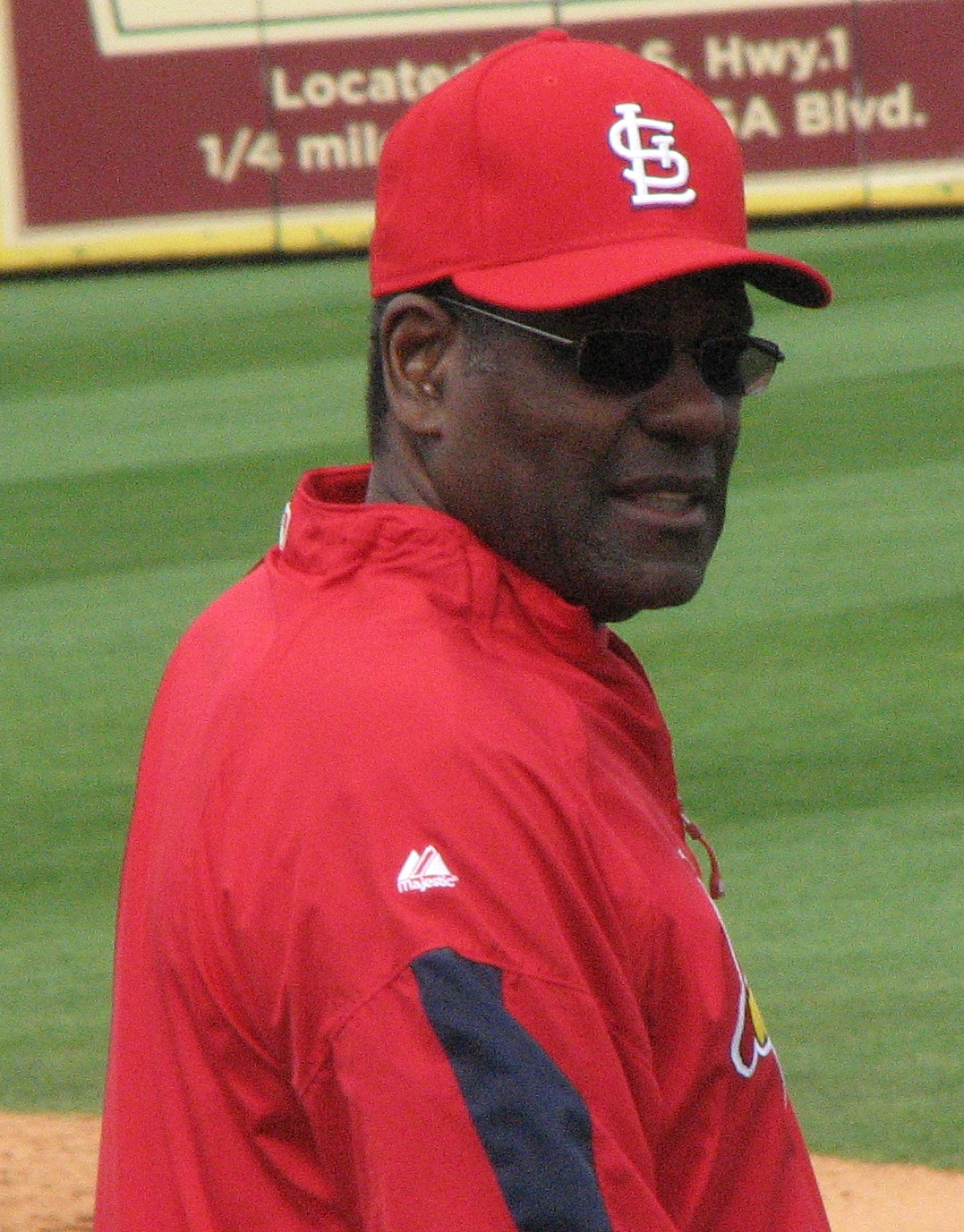
Bob Gibson

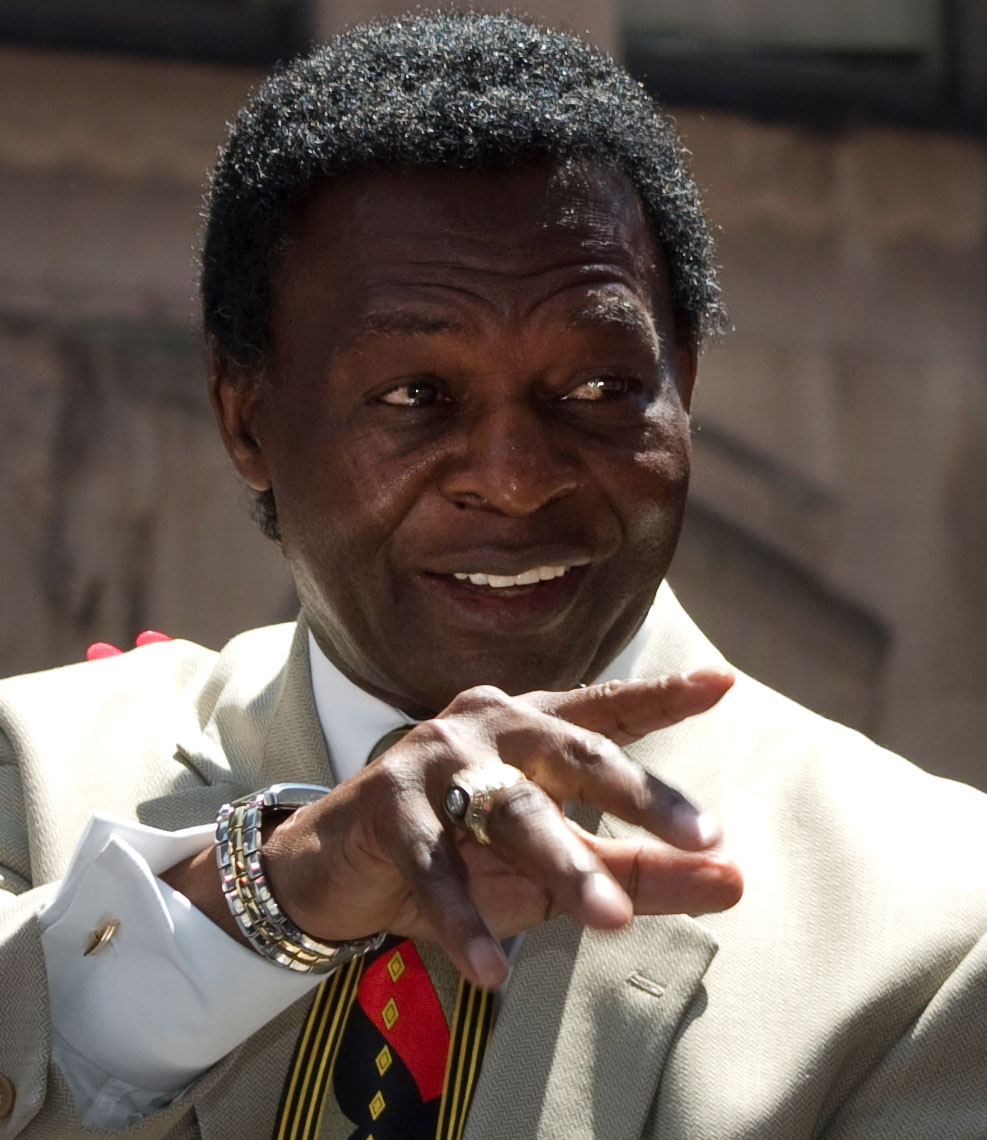
Lou Brock

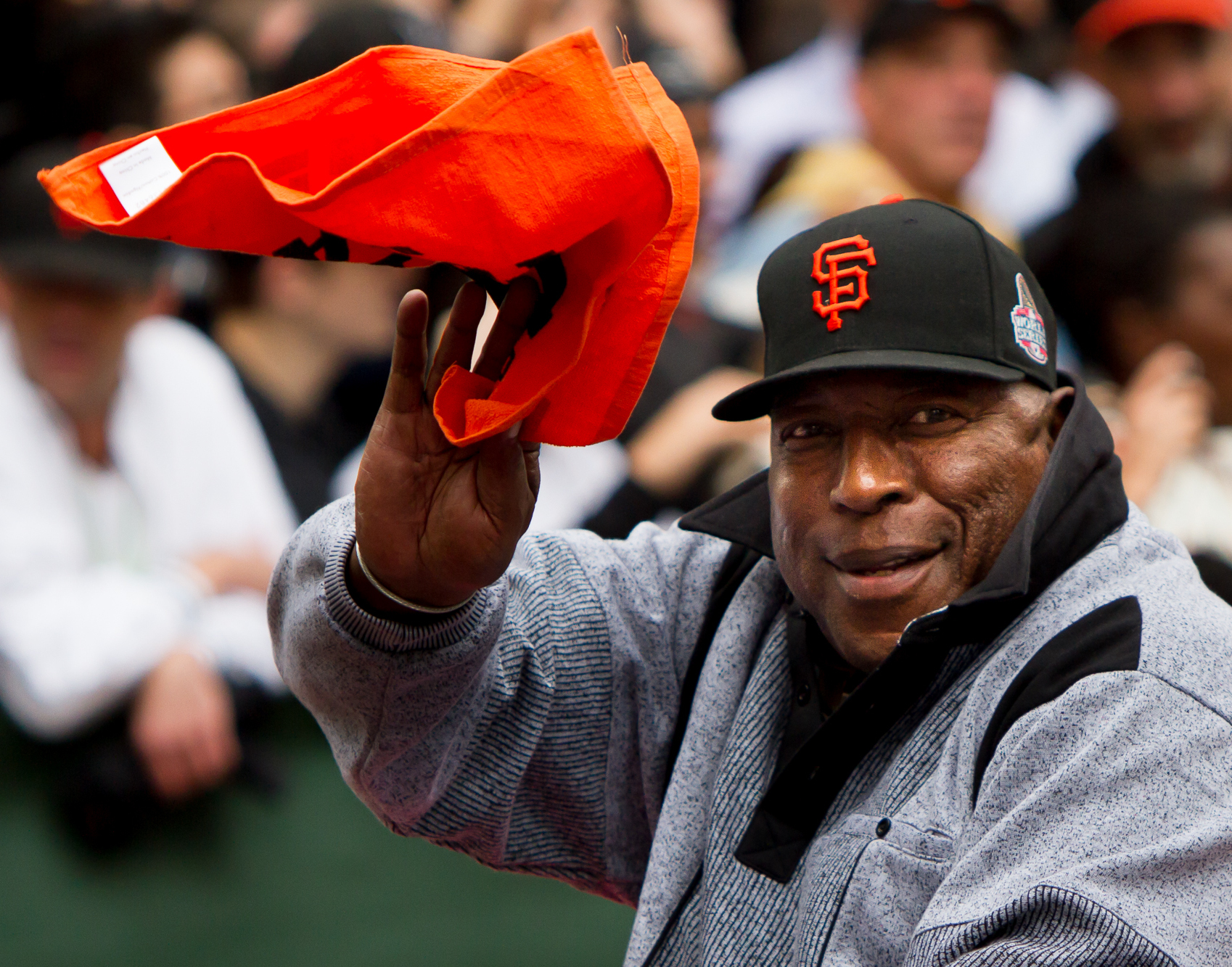
Willie McCovey

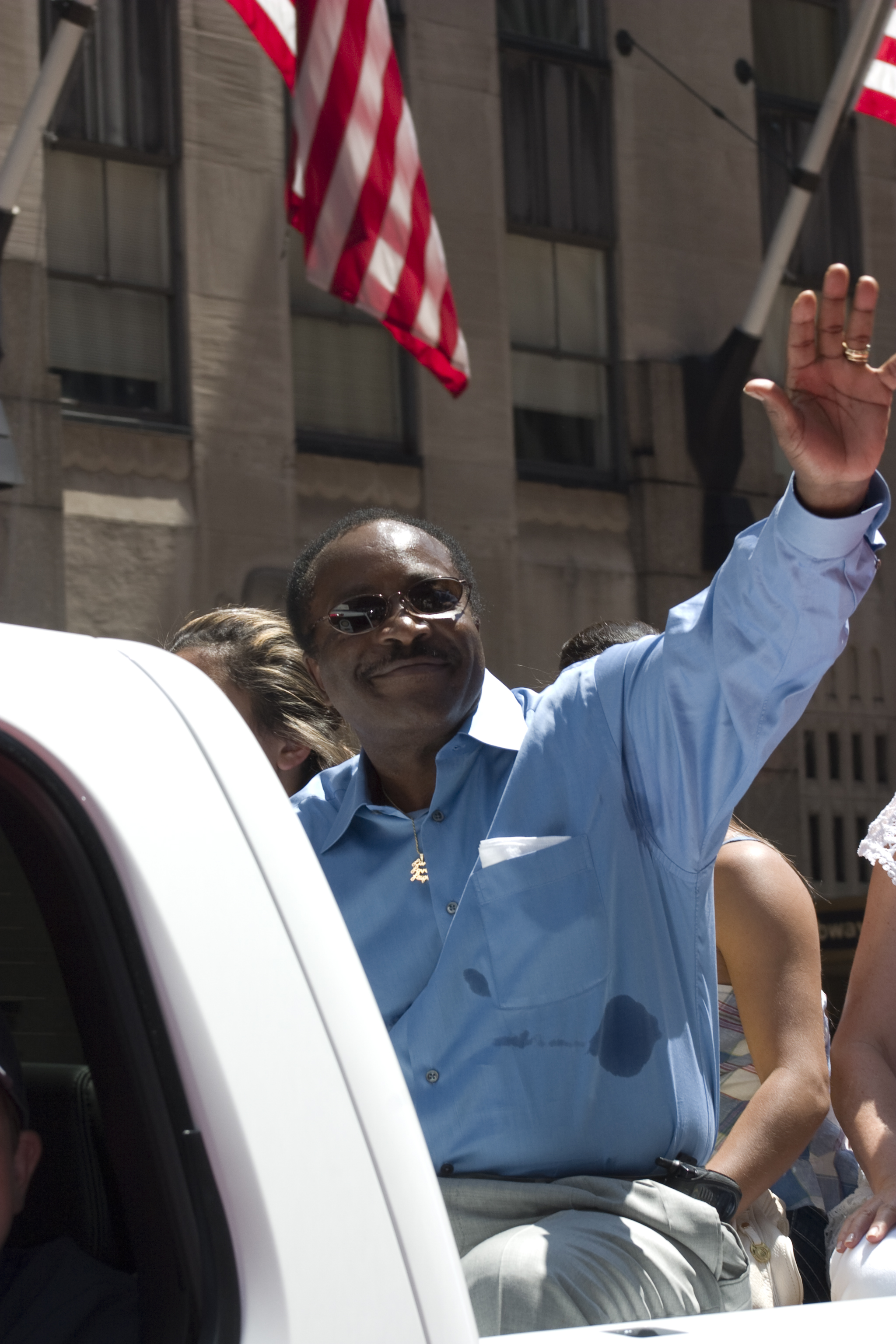
Joe Morgan

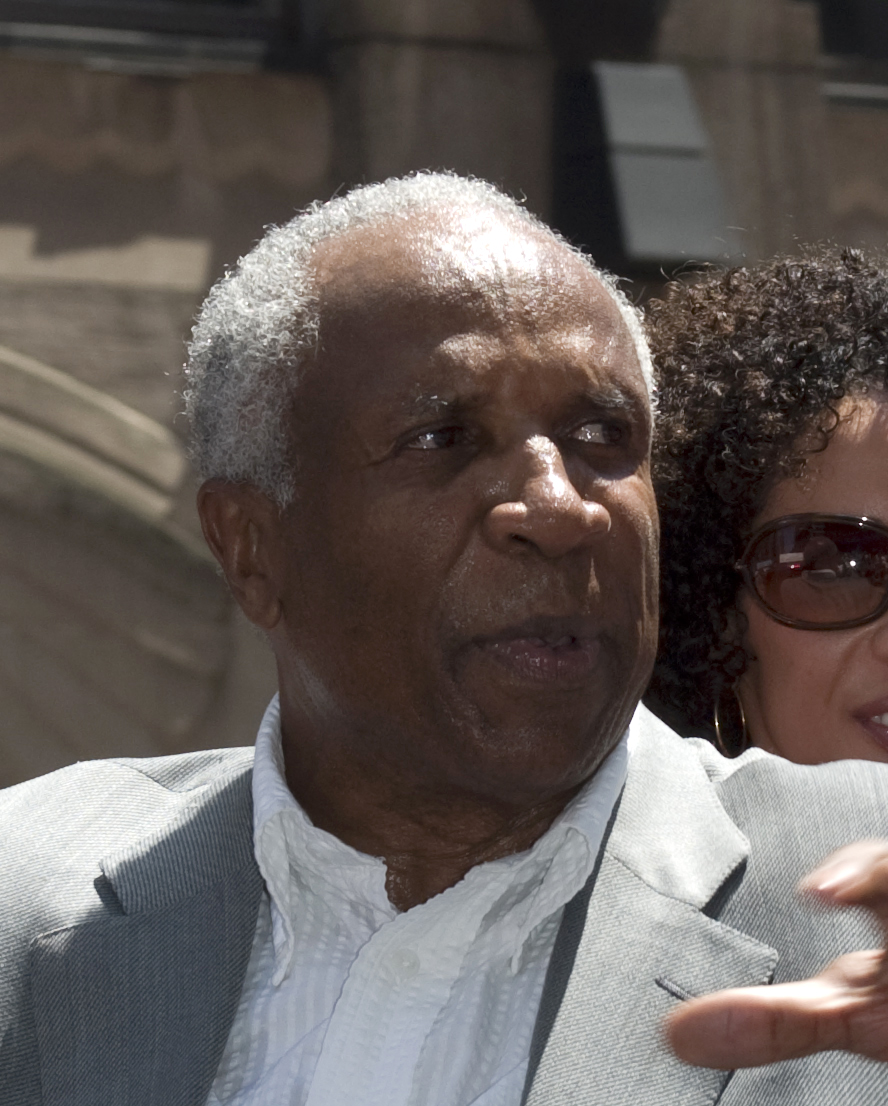
Frank Robinson

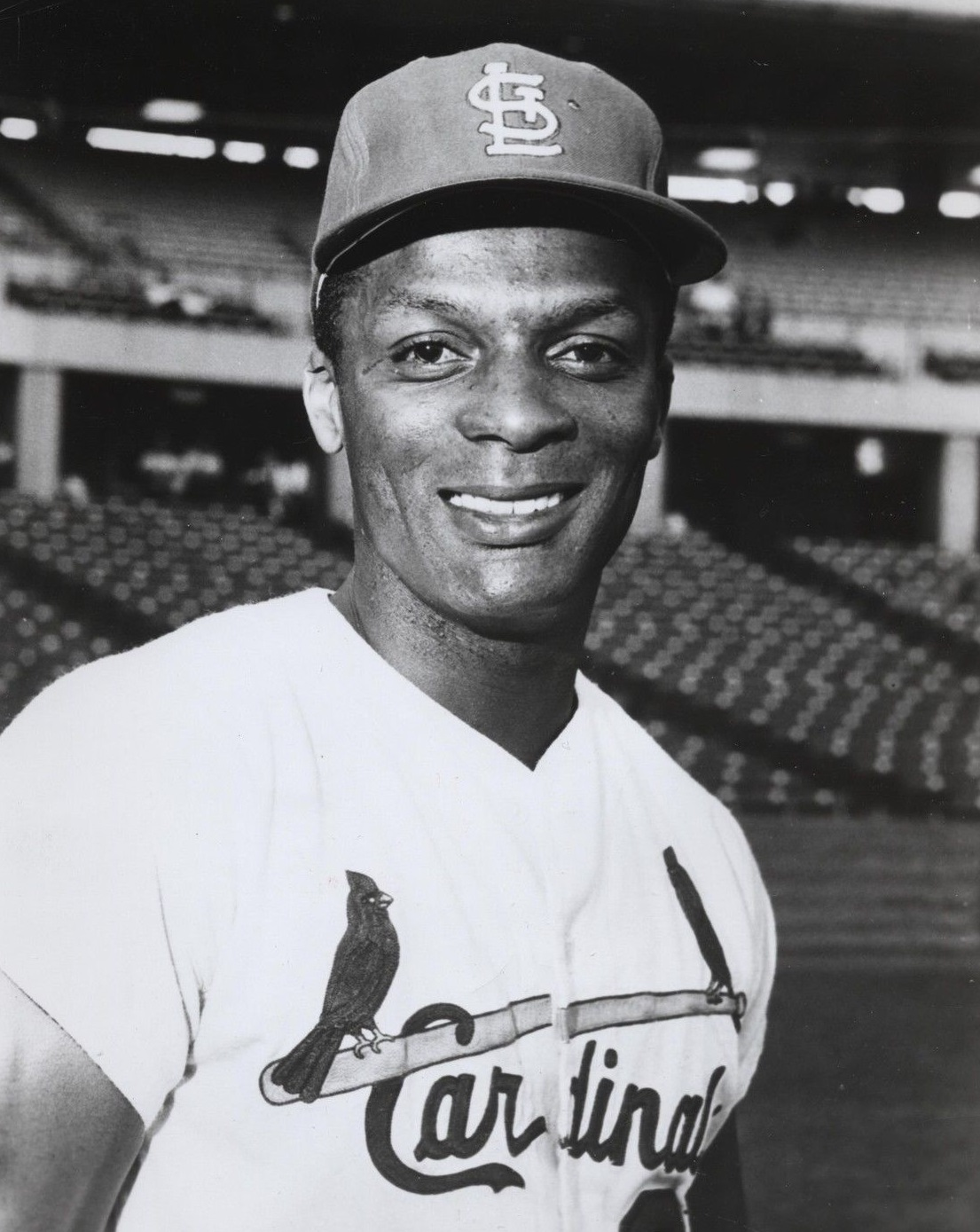
Curt Flood

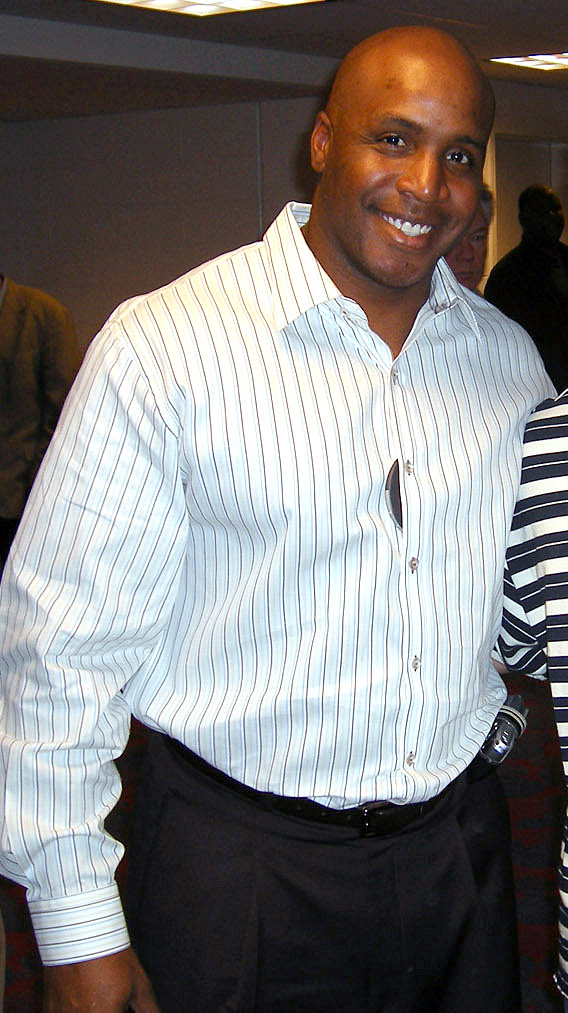
Barry Bonds

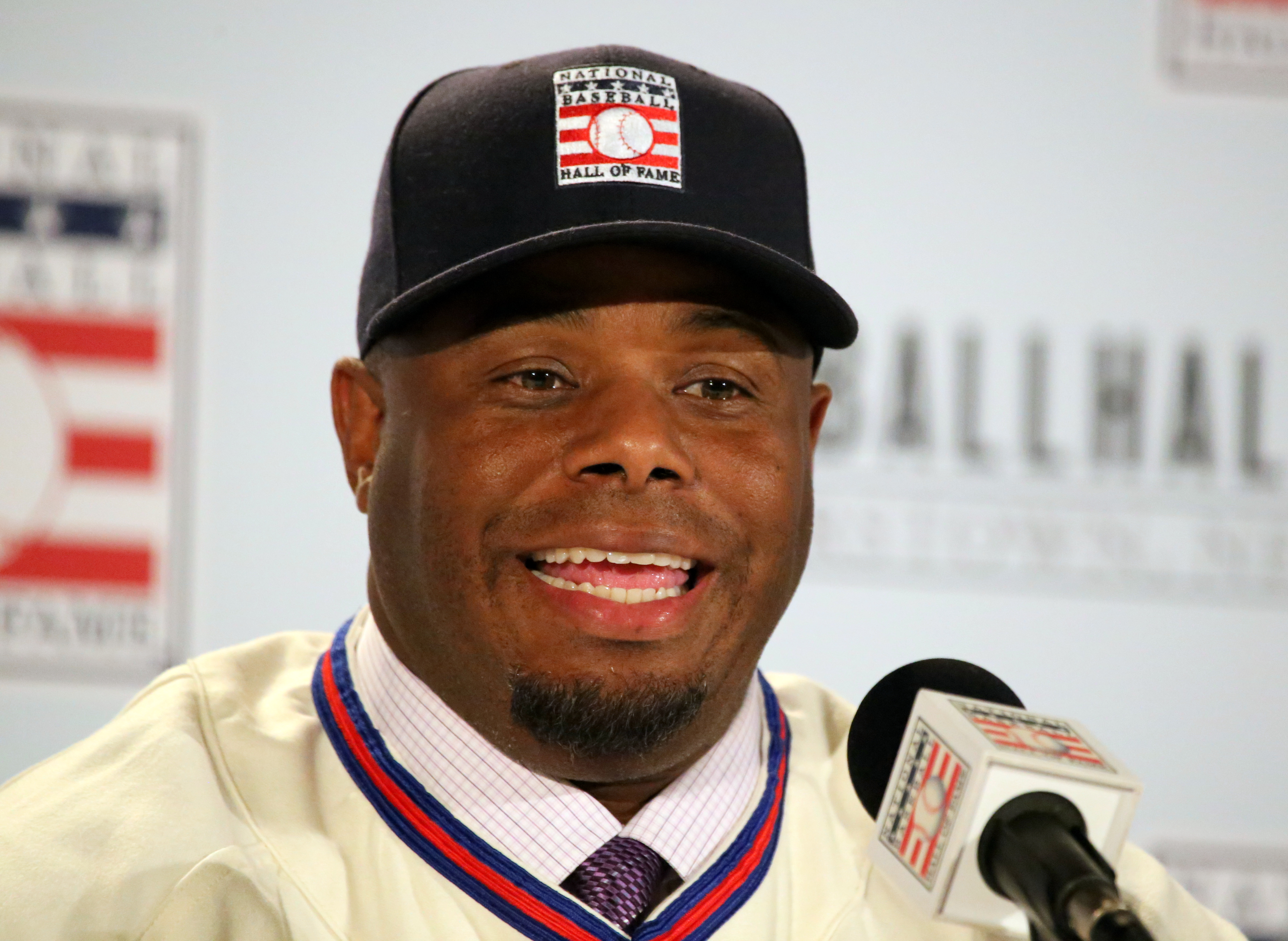
Ken Griffey Jr.

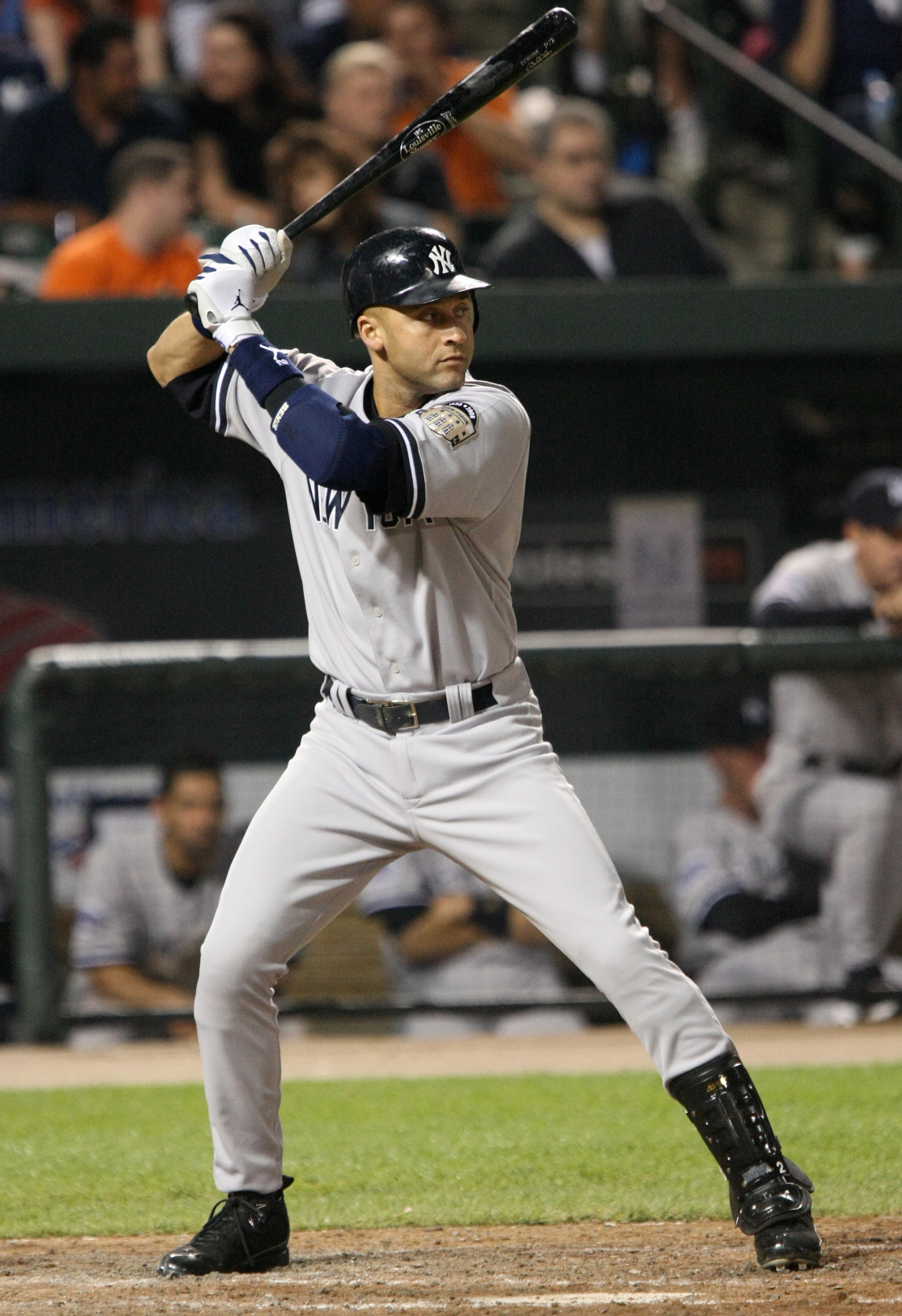
Derek Jeter

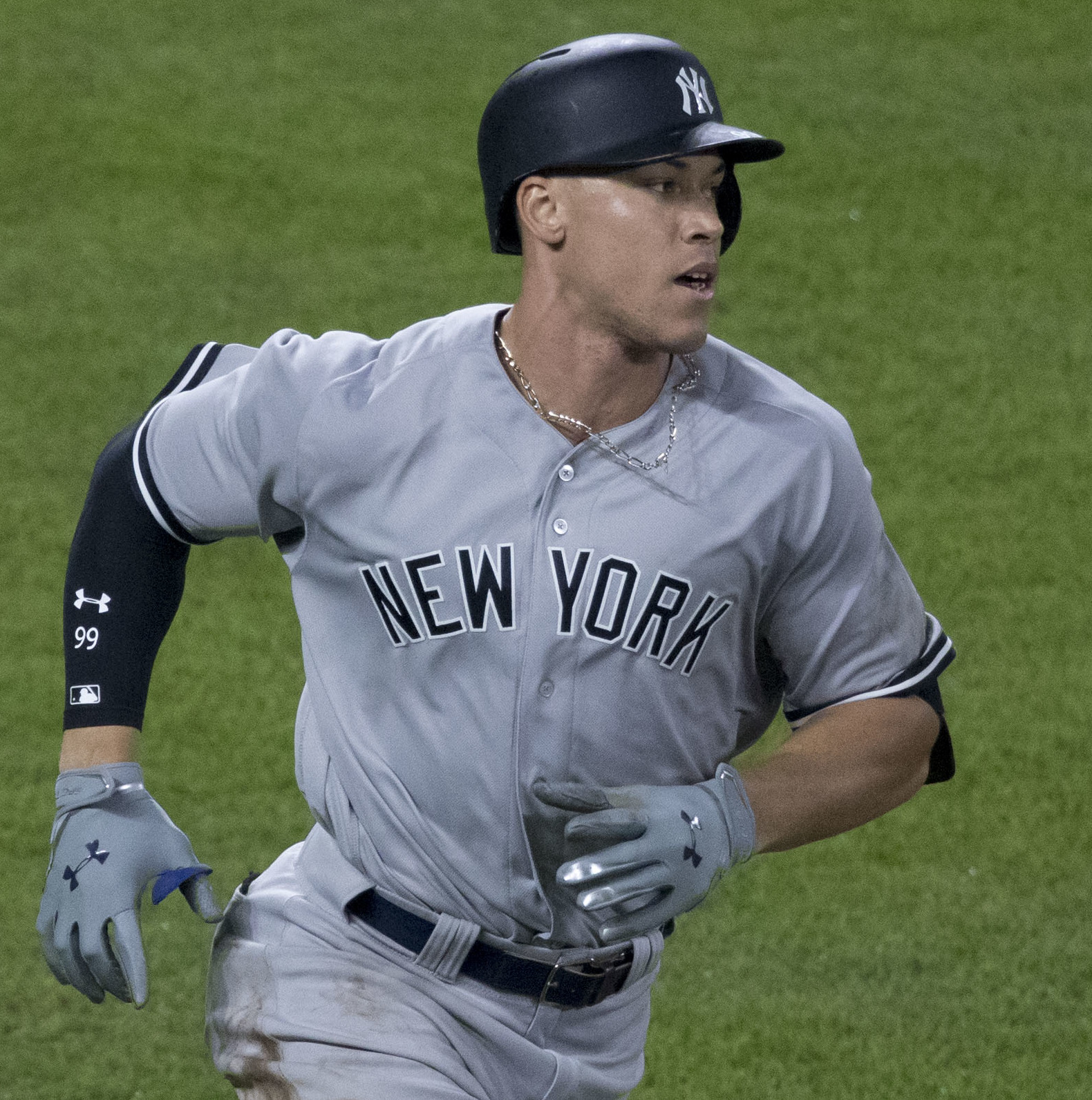
Aaron Judge

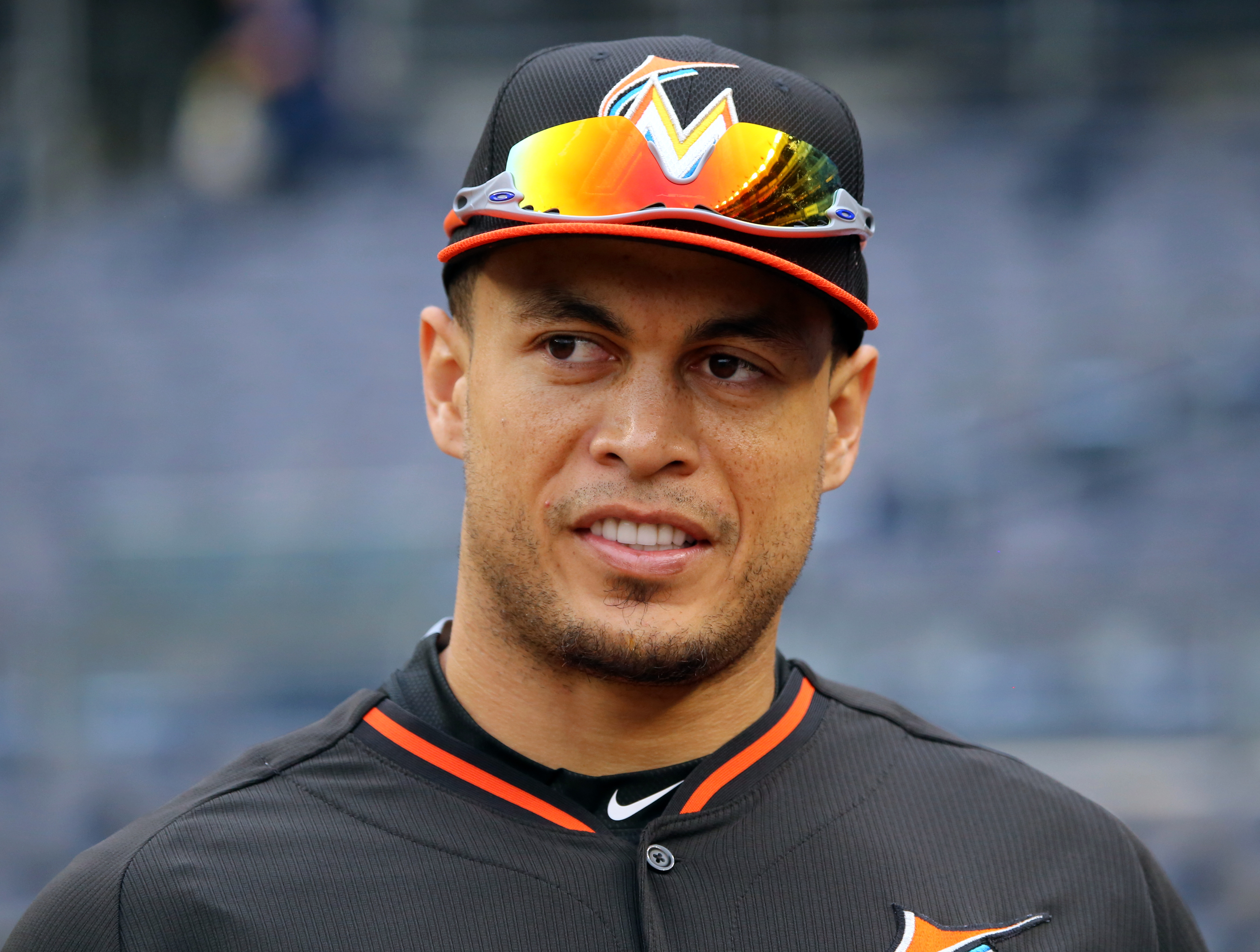
Giancarlo Stanton

=== A ===
- Hank Aaron, retired professional baseball player, member of National Baseball Hall of Fame
- Tommie Aaron
- Tommie Agee
- Willie Aikens
- Gary Alexander
- Matt Alexander
- Ted Alexander
- Dick Allen
- Greg Allen
- Garvin Alston
- George Altman
- Garret Anderson
- Marlon Anderson
- Chris Archer

=== B ===
- Harold Baines
- Dusty Baker
- Gene Baker
- James Baldwin
- Dan Bankhead
- Sam Bankhead
- Ernie Banks
- Willie Banks
- Jesse Barfield
- Kevin Bass
- Earl Battey
- Don Baylor
- Tony Beasley
- Tim Beckham
- Albert Belle
- Mookie Betts
- Junius Bibbs
- Jim Bibby
- Joe Black
- Paul Blair
- Vida Blue
- Barry Bonds
- Bobby Bonds
- Lyman Bostock
- Daryl Boston
- Michael Bourn
- Mickey Bowers
- Jackie Bradley Jr.
- Phil Bradley
- Glenn Braggs
- Michael Brantley
- Chet Brewer
- Marshall Bridges
- Lou Brock
- Hubie Brooks
- Domonic Brown
- Jarvis Brown
- Gates Brown
- Willard Brown
- Don Buford
- Al Bumbry
- Homer Bush
- Byron Buxton

=== C ===
- Lorenzo Cain
- Mike Cameron
- Roy Campanella
- Chris Carter
- Joe Carter
- Nate Colbert
- Vince Coleman
- Cecil Cooper
- Al Cowens
- Carl Crawford
- Willie Crawford

=== D ===
- Eric Davis
- Khris Davis
- Mo'ne Davis
- Rajai Davis
- Tommy Davis
- Willie Davis
- Andre Dawson
- Ian Desmond
- Mike Devereaux
- Chris Dickerson
- Larry Doby
- Al Downing
- Dan Driessen
- Elijah Dukes
- Taylor Duncan
- Shawon Dunston
- Ray Durham
- Leon Durham
- Jermaine Dye
- Jarrod Dyson

=== E ===
- Don Eaddy
- Mike Easler
- Carl Edwards Jr.
- Dock Ellis
- Carl Everett
- Leon Everitt

=== F ===
- Eric Farris
- Mike Felder
- Cecil Fielder
- Prince Fielder
- Chone Figgins
- Curt Flood
- Cliff Floyd
- George Foster
- Rube Foster
- Dexter Fowler

=== G ===
- Ron Gant
- Ralph Garr
- Amir Garrett
- Cito Gaston
- Bob Gibson
- Jim Gilliam
- Doug Glanville
- Dwight Gooden
- Brian Goodwin
- Danny Goodwin
- Tom Goodwin
- Dee Gordon—professional baseball player
- Tom Gordon—former professional baseball player
- Curtis Granderson—professional baseball player
- Mudcat Grant
- Pumpsie Green
- Ken Griffey Jr.—retired professional baseball player, Member of the National Baseball Hall of Fame
- Ken Griffey Sr.
- Marquis Grissom
- Chris Gwynn
- Tony Gwynn—retired professional baseball player, Member of the National Baseball Hall of Fame
- Tony Gwynn Jr.

=== H ===
- Billy Hamilton—professional baseball player
- Jeffrey Hammonds
- Mike Harkey—retired professional baseball player
- Tommy Harper—former professional baseball player
- Lenny Harris
- Willie Harris
- Wilmer Harris
- Josh Harrison—professional baseball player
- Billy Hatcher
- LaTroy Hawkins—retired professional baseball player
- Charlie Hayes—former professional baseball player
- Dave Henderson—former professional baseball player
- Rickey Henderson—retired professional baseball player, Member of National Baseball Hall of Fame
- Steve Henderson—former professional baseball player
- George Hendrick—former professional baseball player
- Elrod Hendricks—former professional baseball player
- Larry Herndon—former professional baseball player
- Jason Heyward—professional baseball player
- Aaron Hicks—professional baseball player
- Glenallen Hill—former professional baseball player
- Larry Hisle—former professional baseball player
- L.J. Hoes—professional baseball player
- Elston Howard—retired professional baseball player
- Ryan Howard—professional baseball player
- Orlando Hudson—former professional baseball player
- Torii Hunter—retired professional baseball player

=== I ===
- Monte Irvin—retired professional baseball player, Member of the National Baseball Hall of Fame

=== J ===
- Austin Jackson—professional baseball player
- Aaron Judge—professional baseball player
- Reggie Jackson – former professional baseball player, member of National Baseball Hall of Fame
- Bo Jackson—former professional baseball player
- Edwin Jackson—professional baseball player
- Grant Jackson—former professional baseball player
- Jeremy Jeffress—professional baseball player
- Desmond Jennings—professional baseball player
- Derek Jeter (African-American father)—retired professional baseball player
- Sam Jethroe—former professional baseball player
- Alex Johnson—retired professional baseball player
- Charles Johnson—former professional baseball player
- Cliff Johnson—former professional baseball player
- Sam Jethroe—former professional baseball player
- Alex Johnson—former professional baseball player
- Charles Johnson—former professional baseball player
- Cliff Johnson—former professional baseball player
- Micah Johnson—professional baseball player
- Adam Jones—professional baseball player
- Cleon Jones—former professional baseball player
- Gary Jones—professional baseball manager
- Ruppert Jones—retired professional baseball player
- Sam Jones—former professional baseball player
- David Justice—retired professional baseball player

=== K ===
- Matt Kemp—professional baseball player
- Howie Kendrick—professional baseball player
- Wayne Kirby—retired professional baseball player

=== L ===
- Buck Leonard, former professional baseball player

=== P ===
- Satchel Paige, former professional baseball player

=== R ===
- Jackie Robinson, former professional baseball player, member of the National Baseball Hall of Fame, first African American to play in Major league Baseball
- Frank Robinson, former professional baseball player

=== S ===
- CC Sabathia, professional baseball player
- Giancarlo Stanton, professional baseball player
- Gary Sheffield, retired professional baseball player
- Justus Sheffield, professional baseball player

=== M ===
- Lee May – former professional baseball player
- Andrew McCutchen – professional baseball player
- Willie McCovey – former professional baseball player
- Joe Morgan – retired professional baseball player

=== N ===
- Don Newcombe – former professional baseball player

=== W ===
- Dave Winfield – retired professional baseball player
- Jerome Williams – baseball player

== Basketball ==
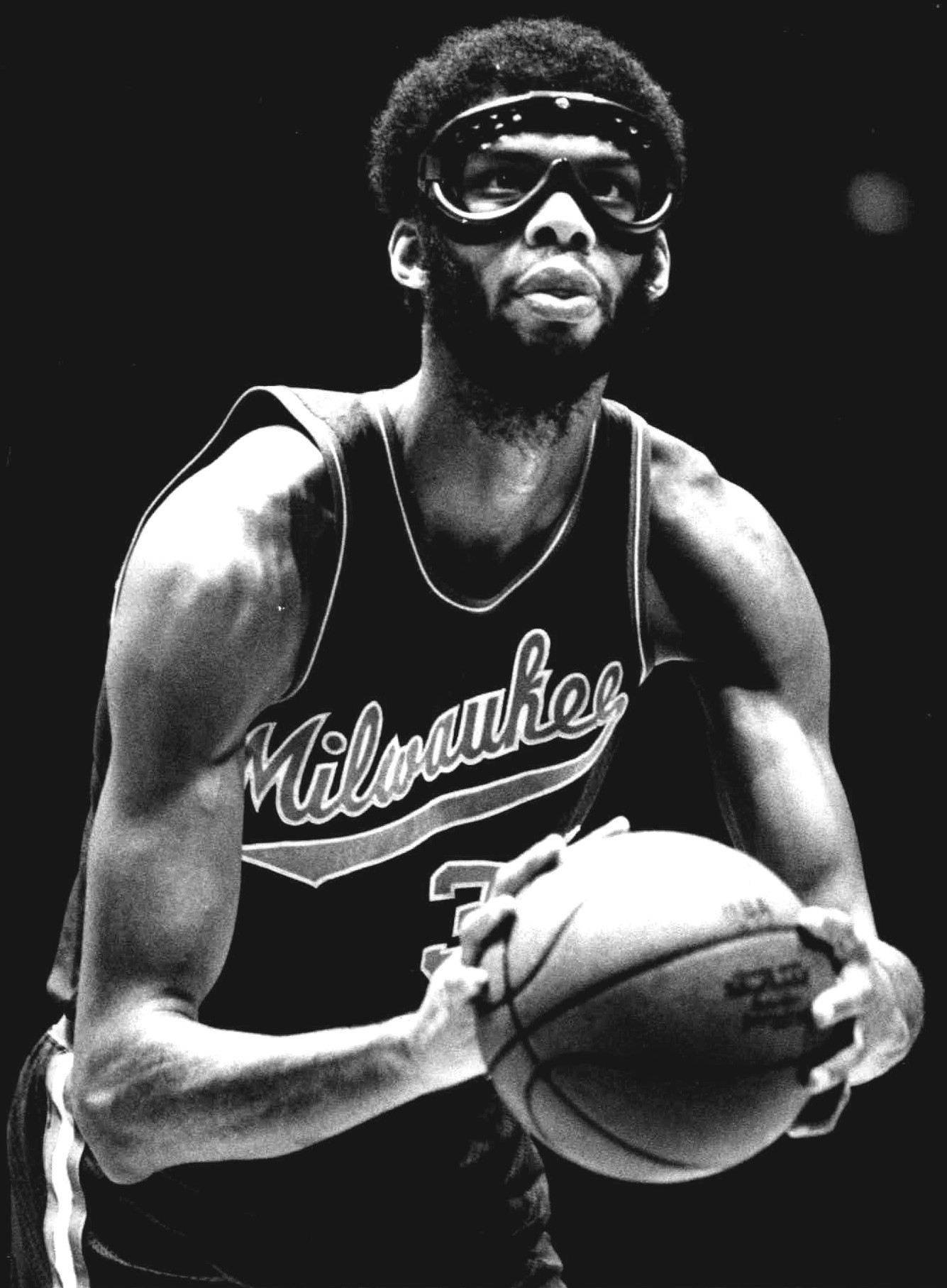
Kareem Abdul-Jabbar

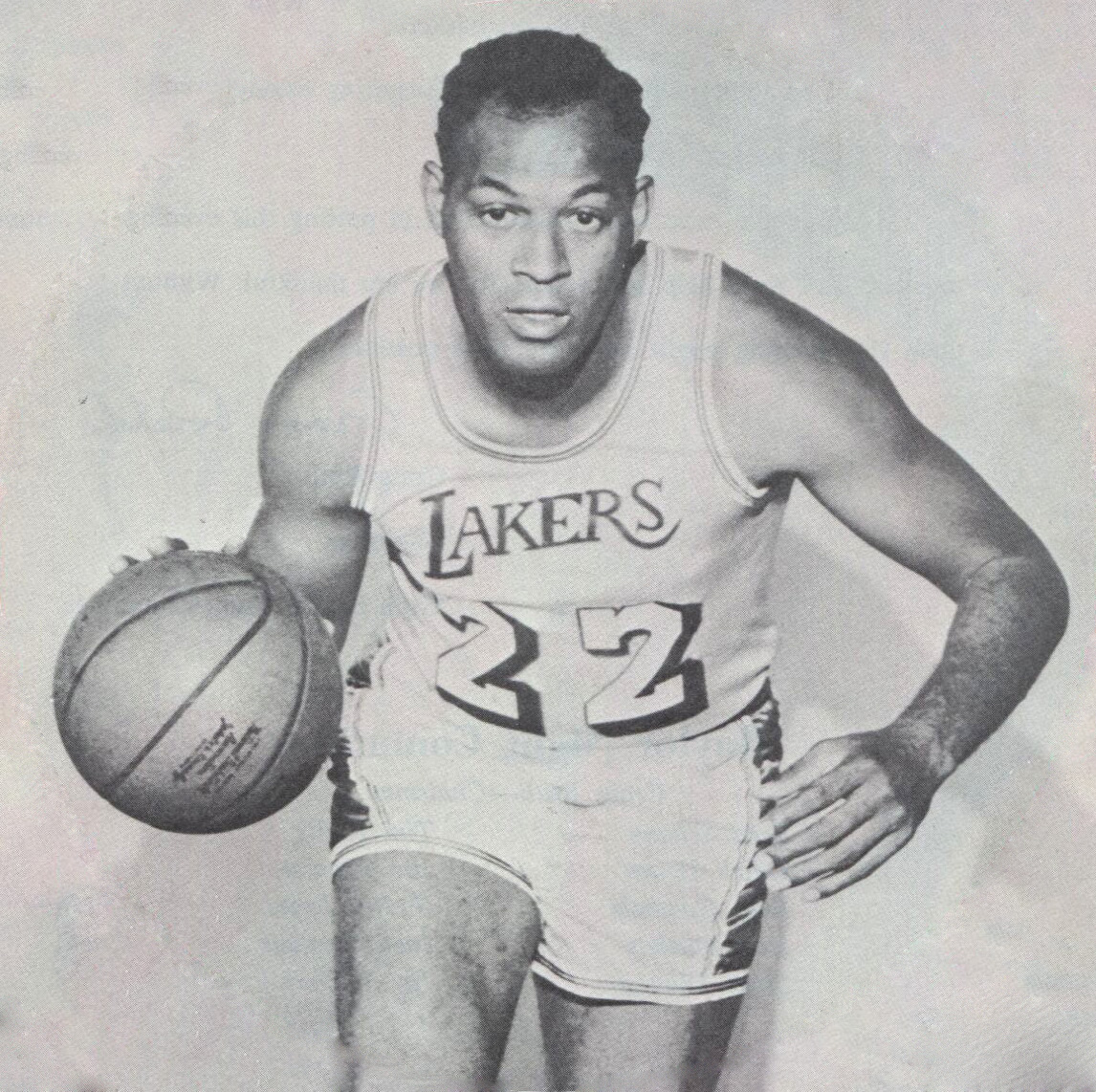
Elgin Baylor

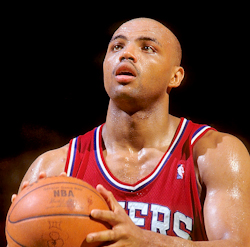
Charles Barkley

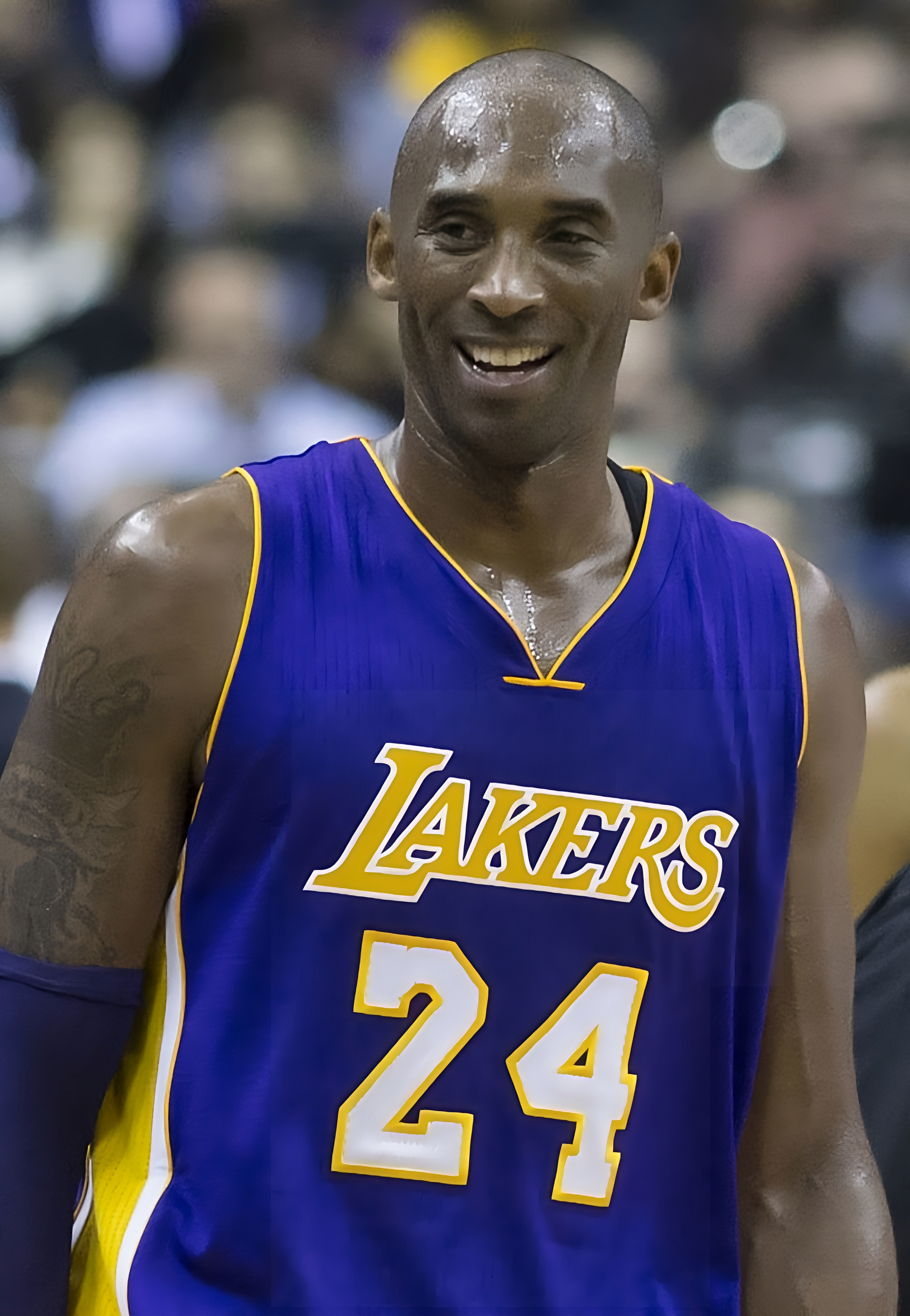
Kobe Bryant

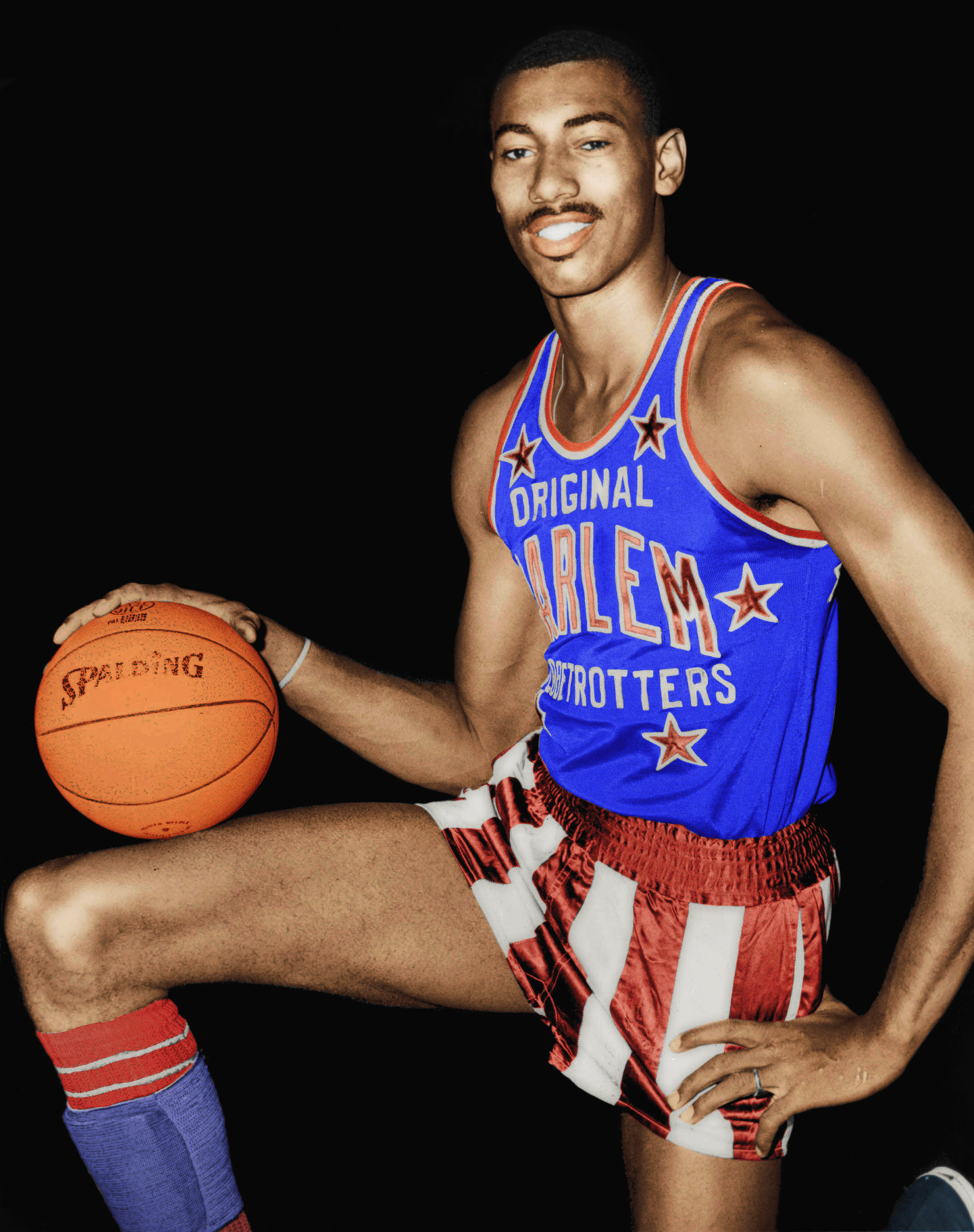
Wilt Chamberlain

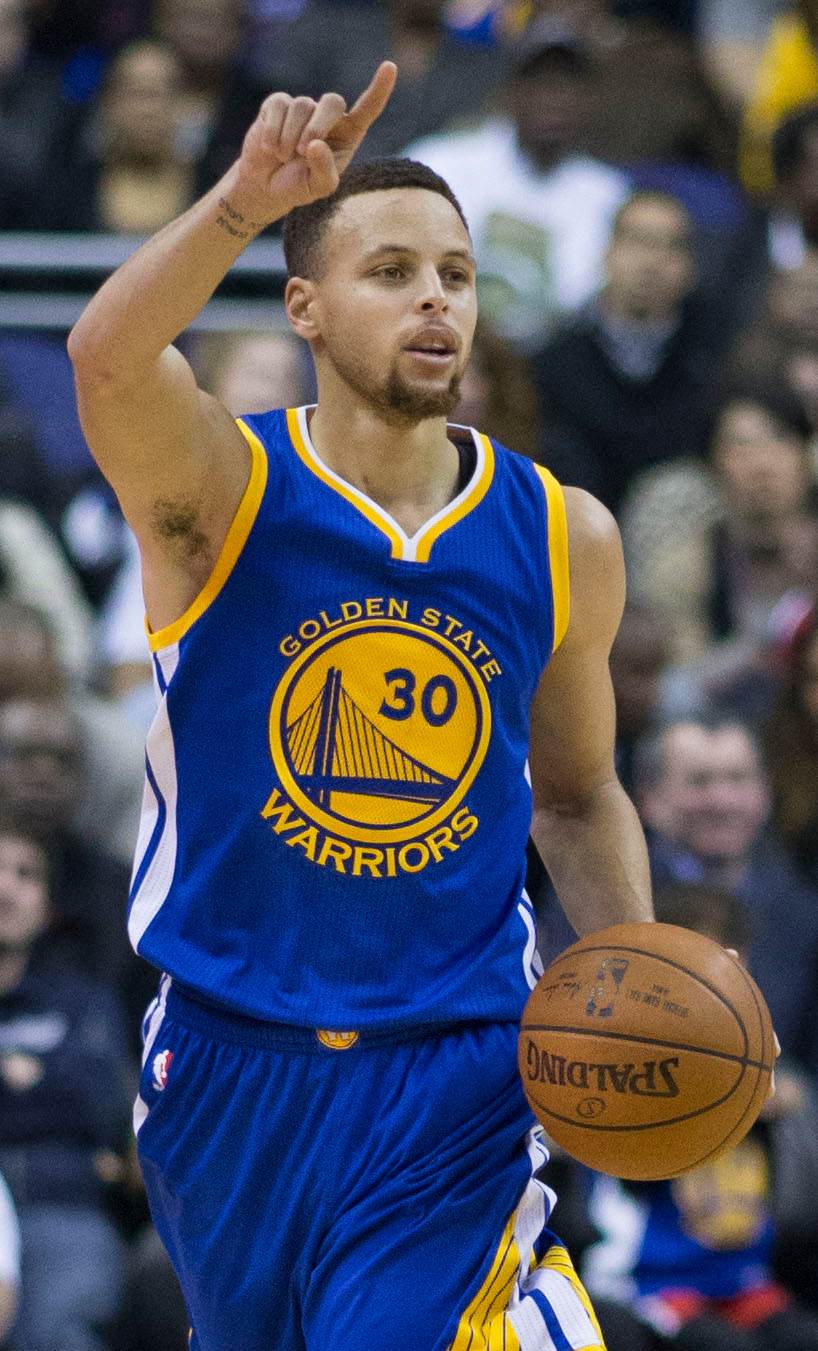
Stephen Curry

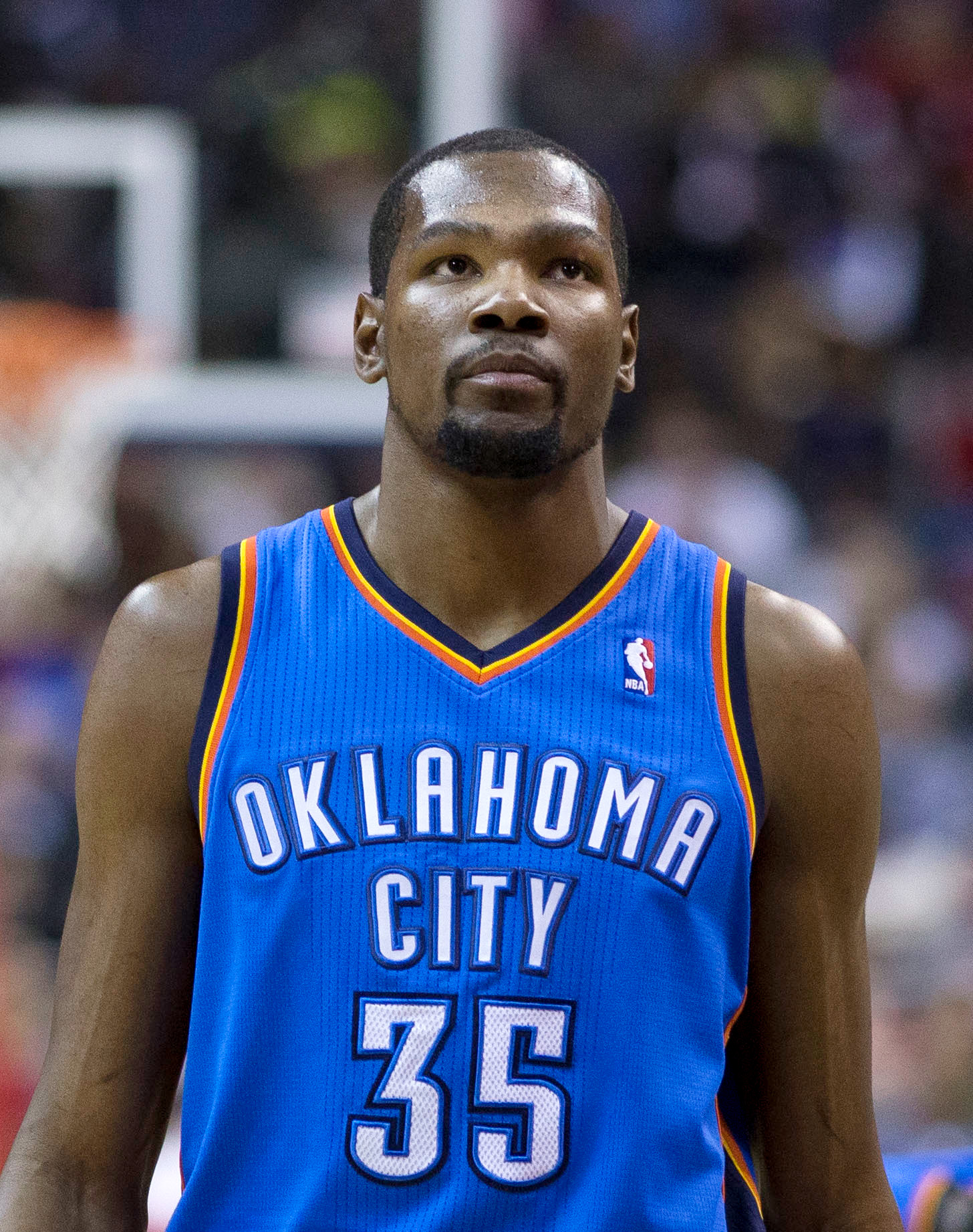
Kevin Durant

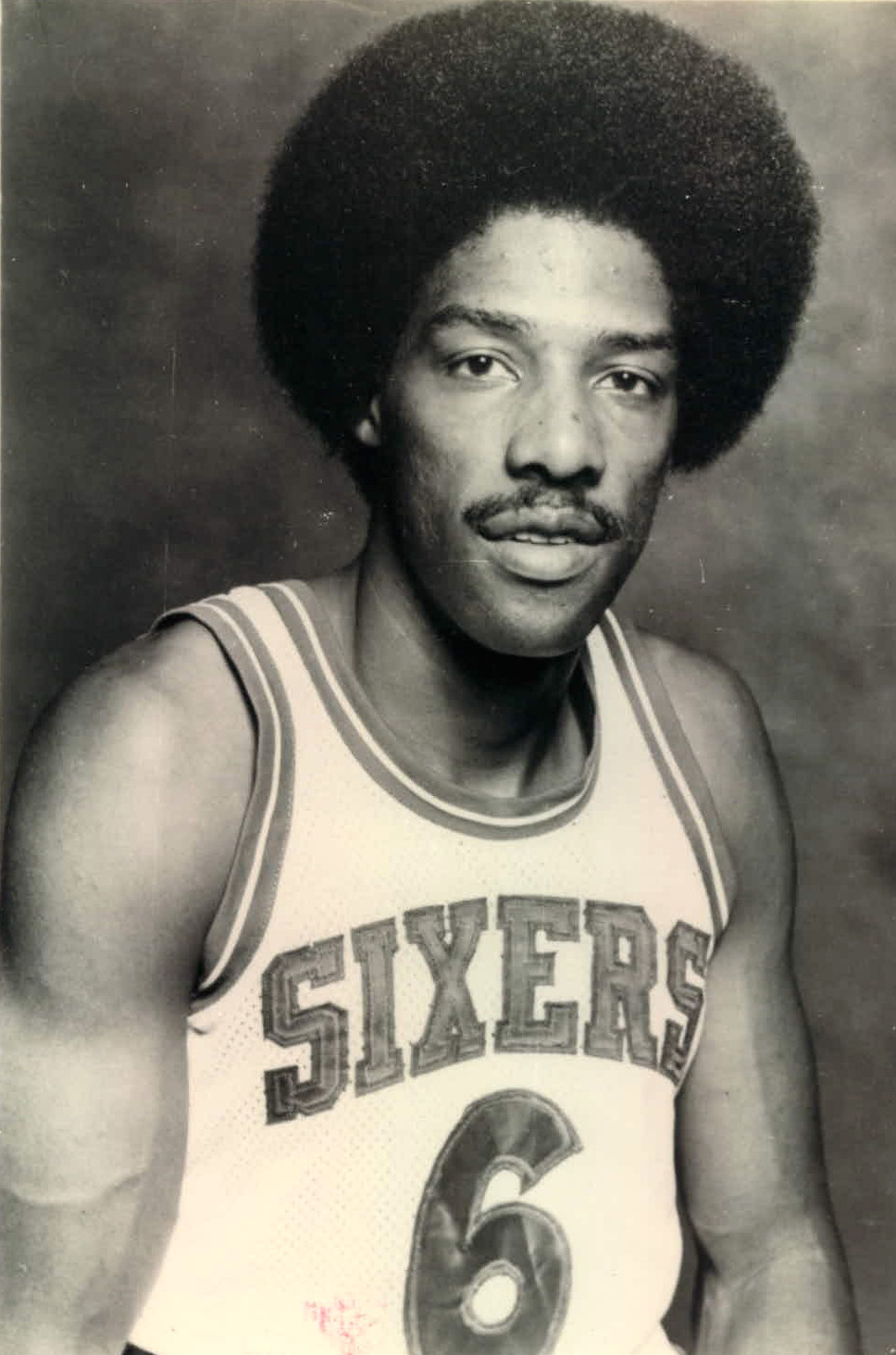
Julius Erving

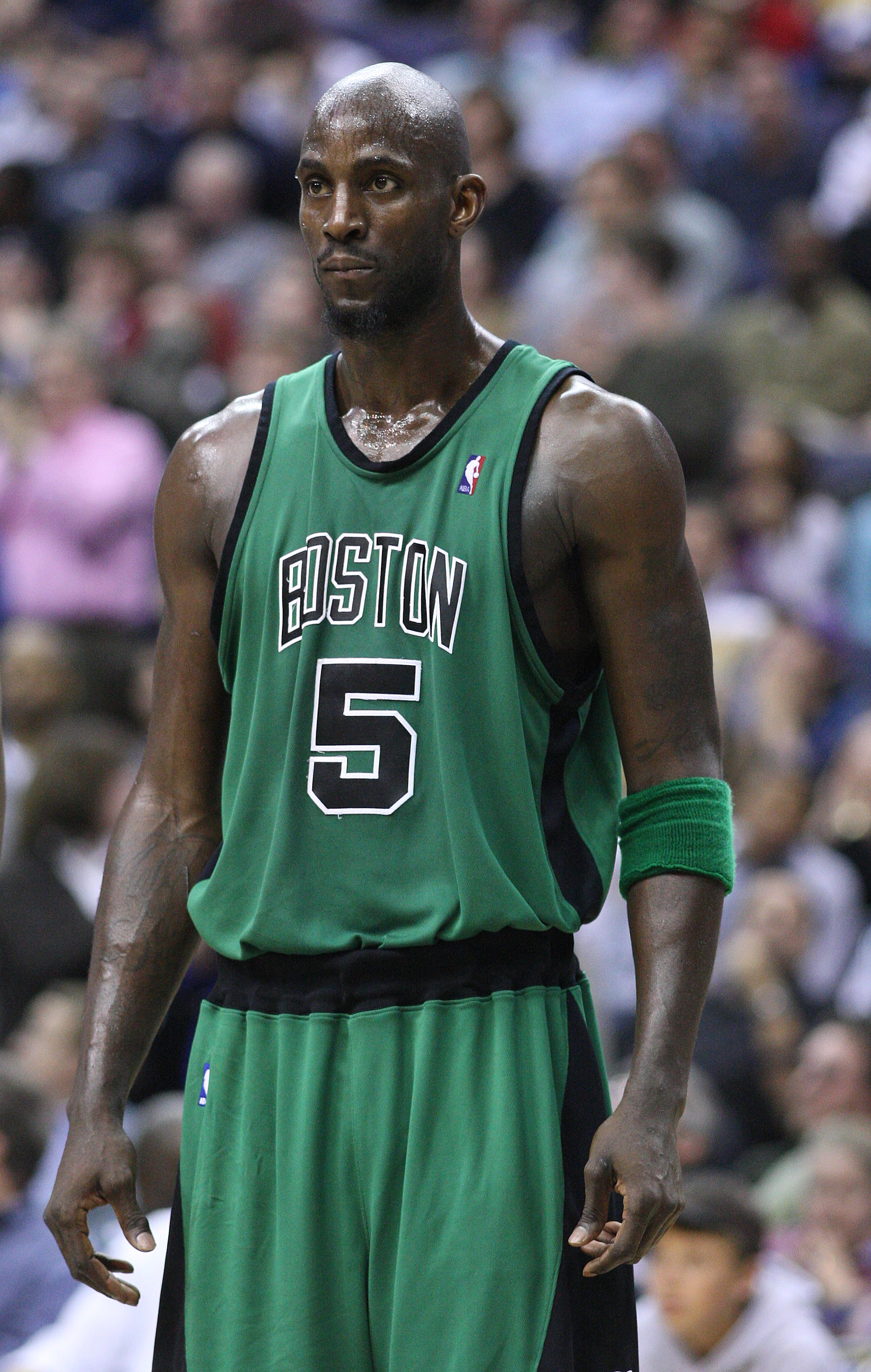
Kevin Garnett

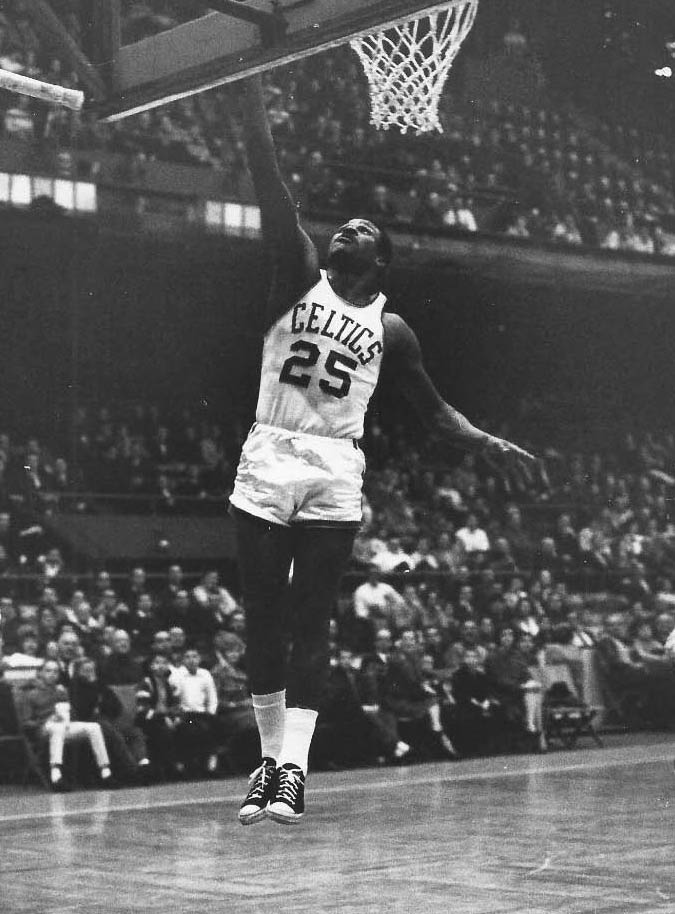
K. C. Jones

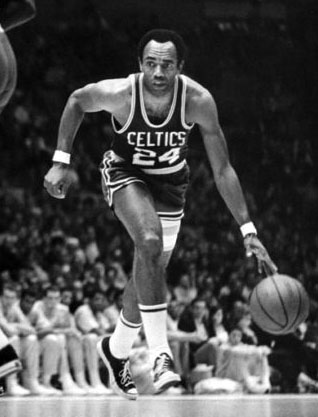
Sam Jones

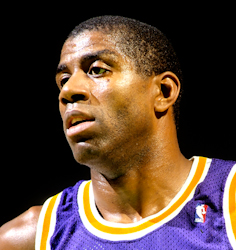
Magic Johnson

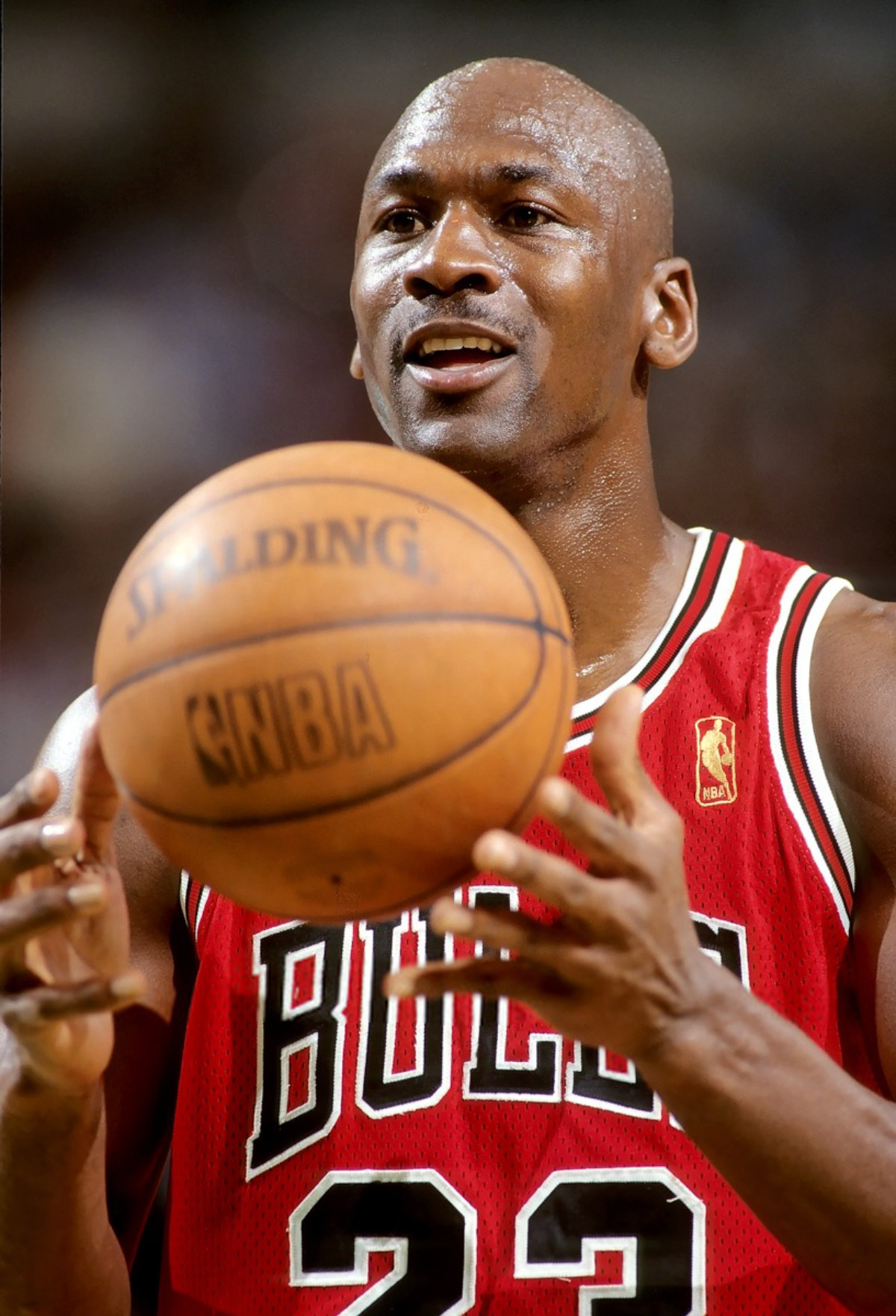
Michael Jordan

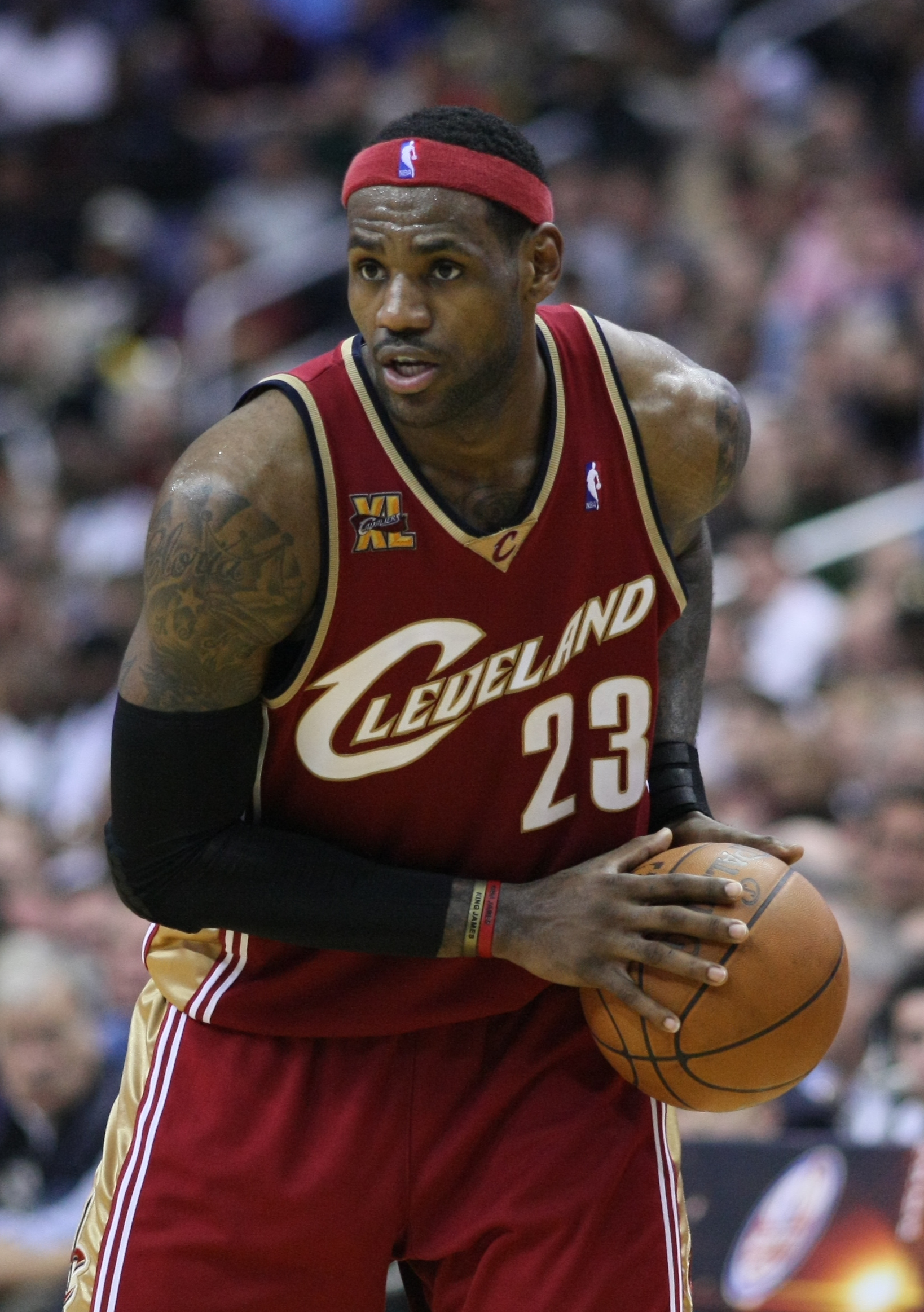
LeBron James

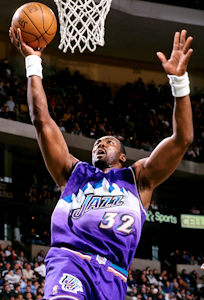
Karl Malone

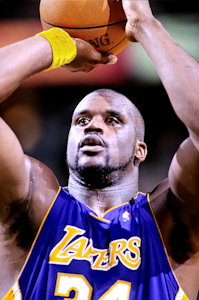
Shaquille O'Neal

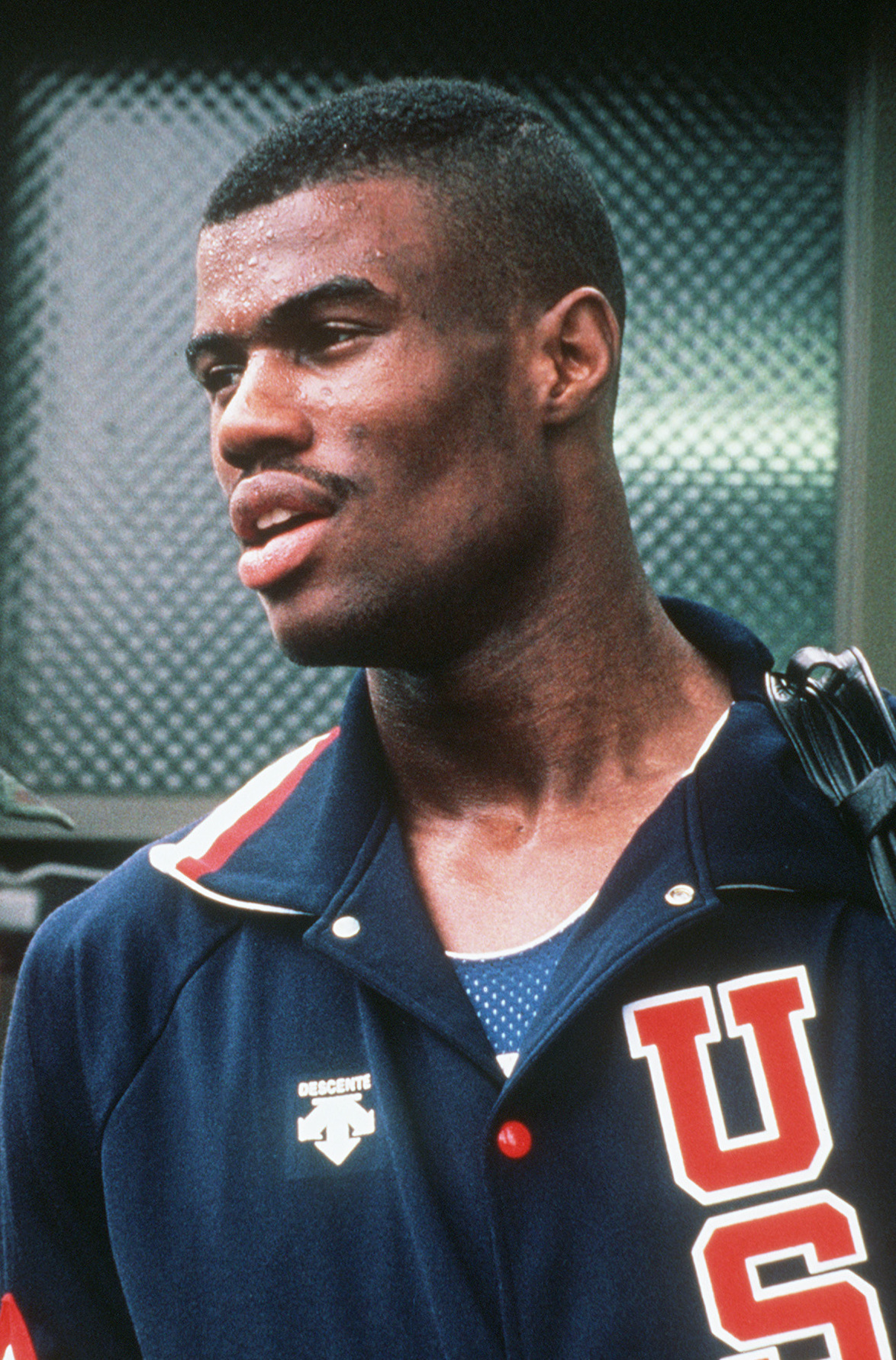
David Robinson

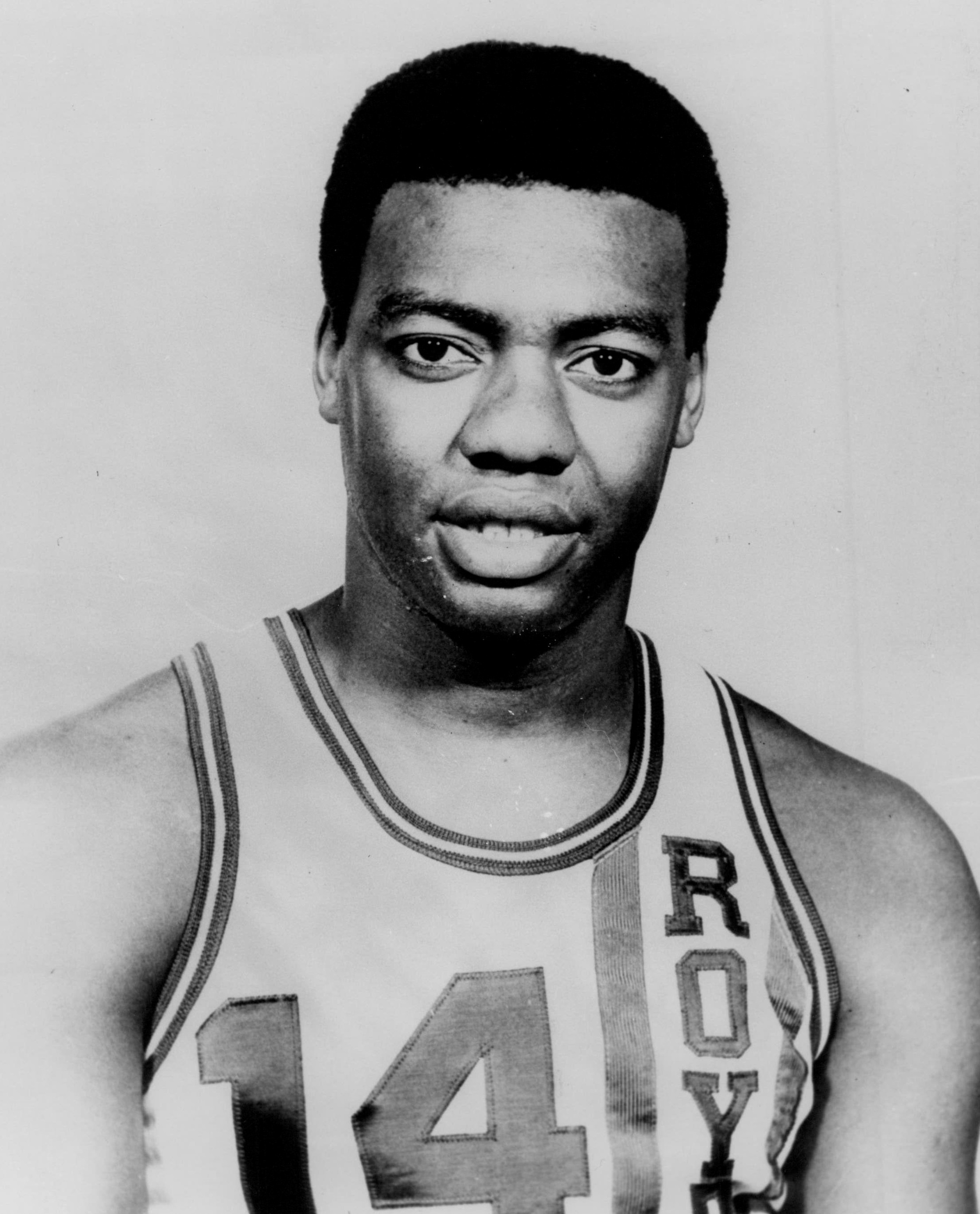
Oscar Robertson

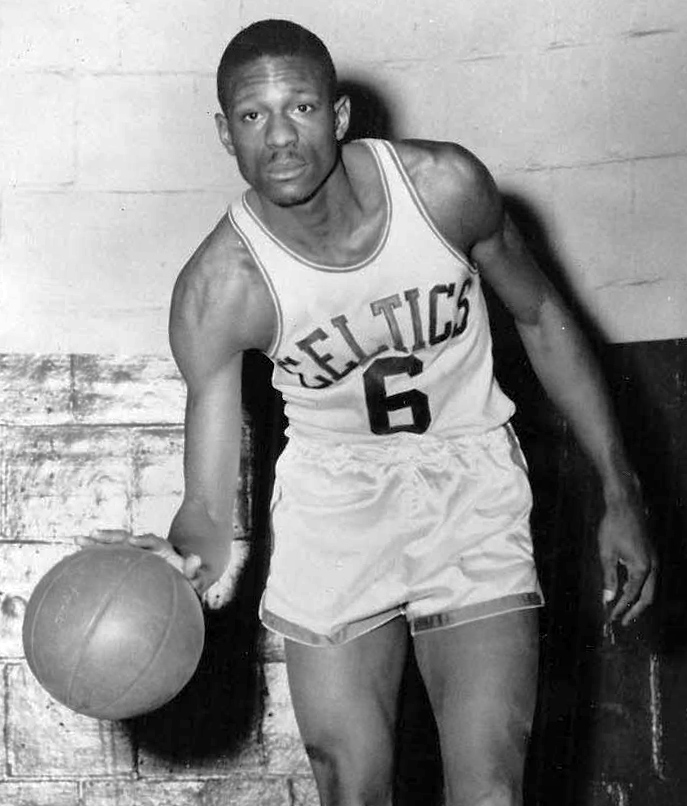
Bill Russell

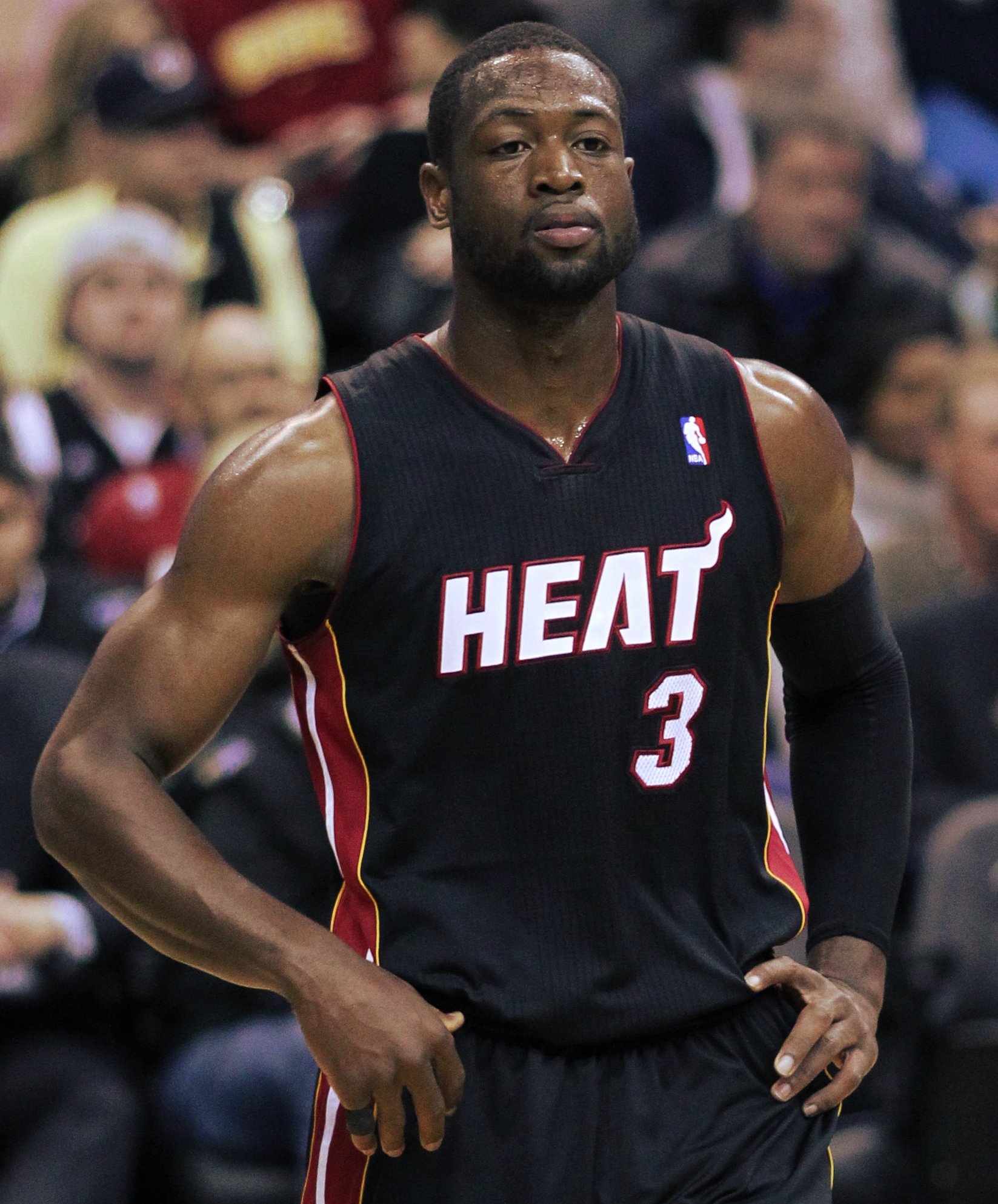
Dwyane Wade

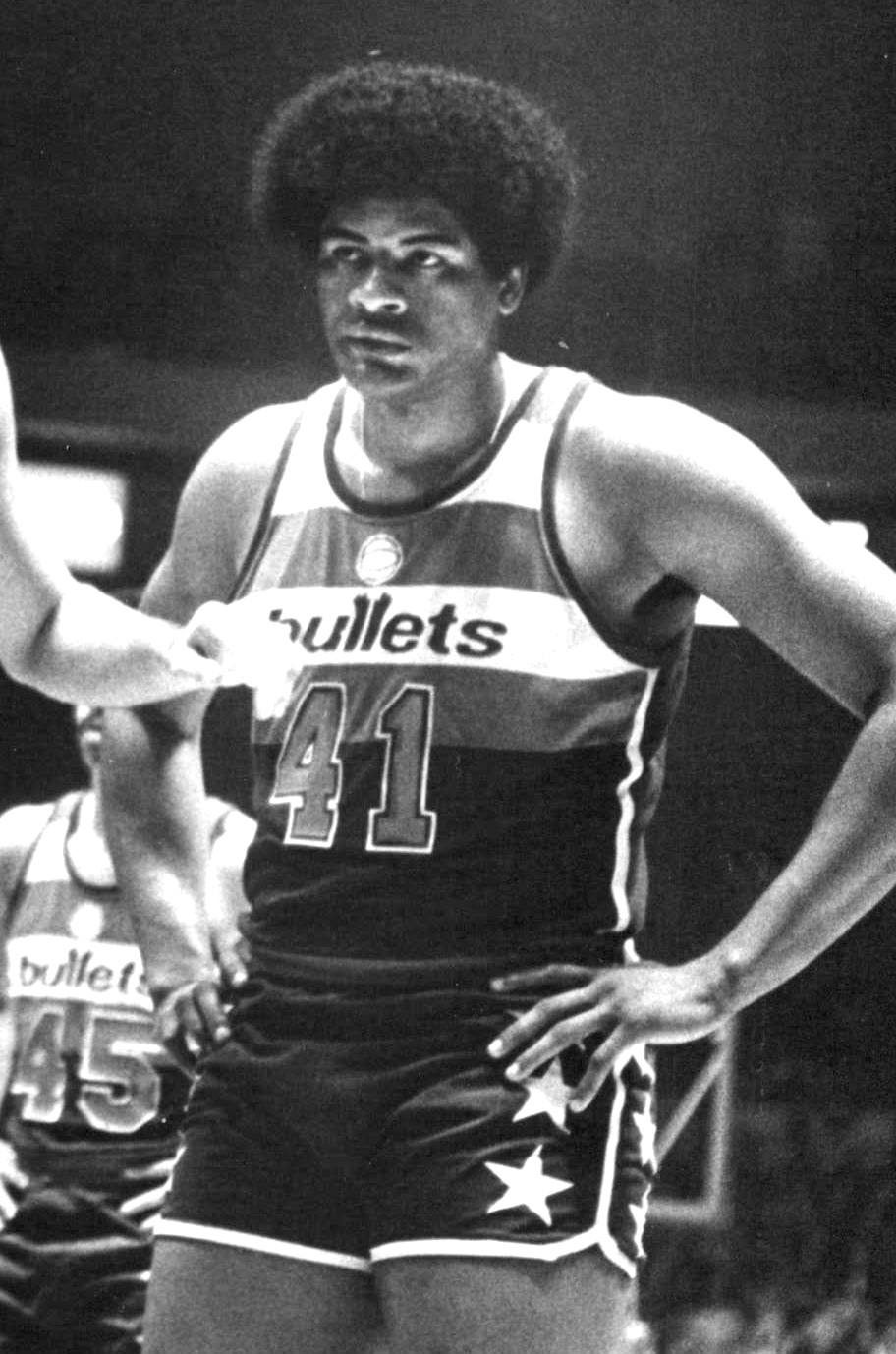
Wes Unseld

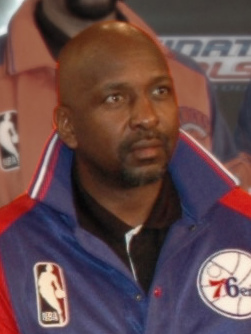
Moses Malone

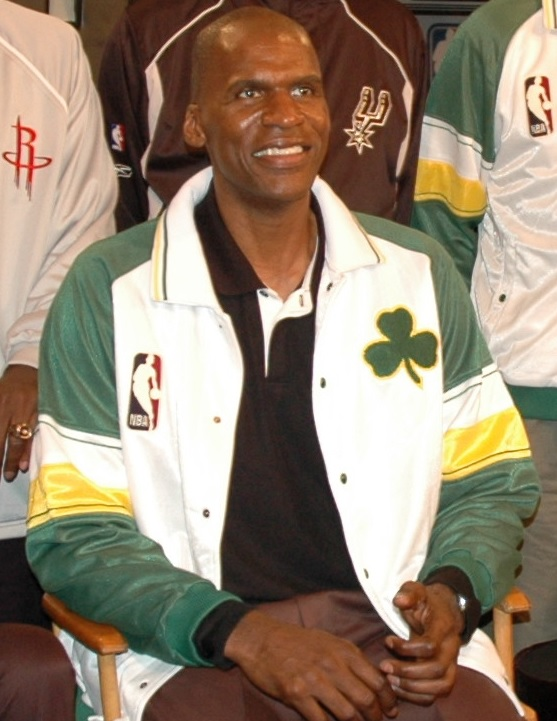
Robert Parish

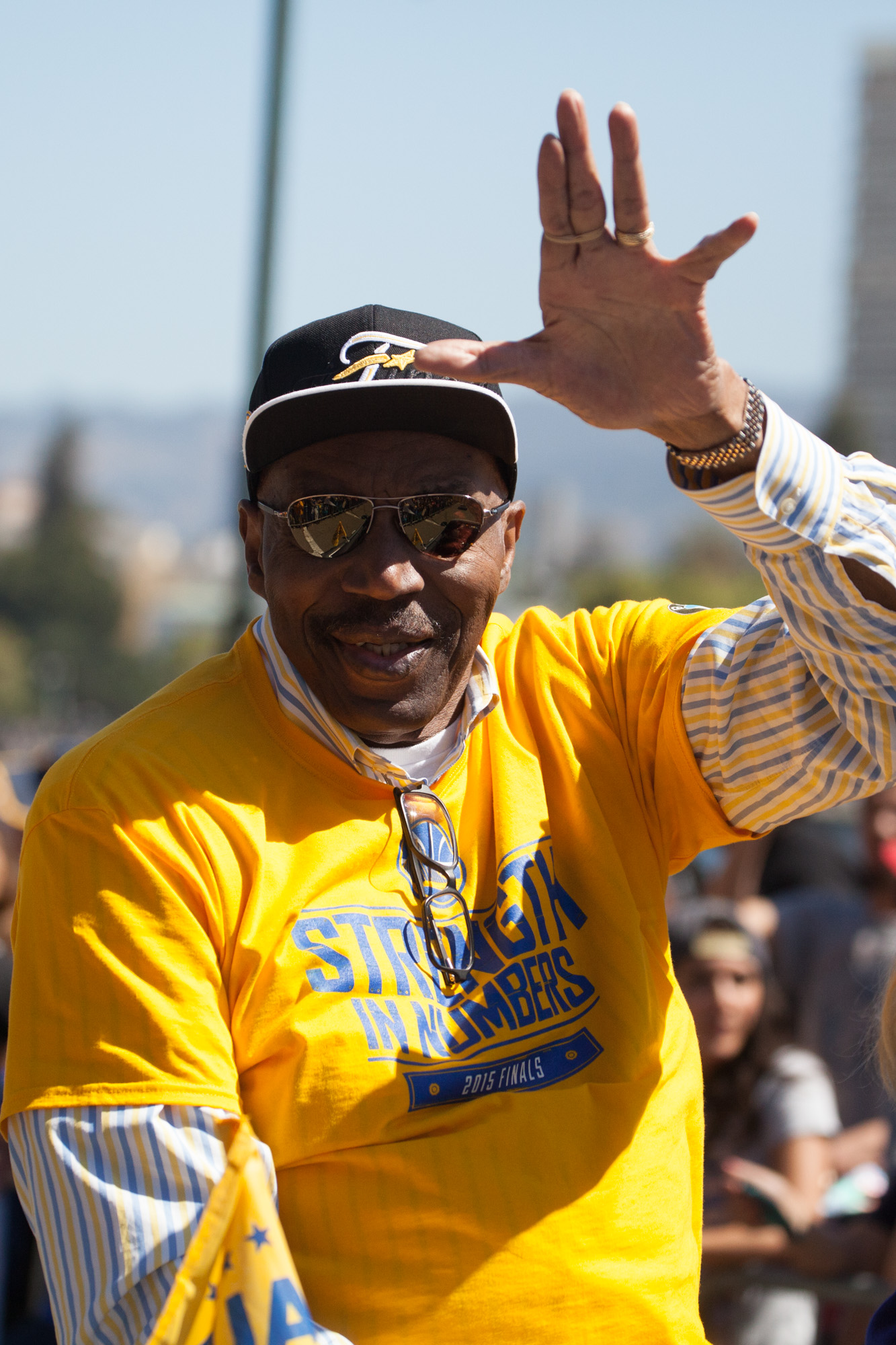
Nate Thurmond

=== A ===
- Kareem Abdul-Jabbar - former professional basketball player, member of the Naismith Memorial Basketball Hall of Fame
- Quincy Acy - professional basketball player
- Jordan Adams - professional basketball player
- Arron Afflalo - professional basketball player
- Arthur Agee - retired professional basketball player
- Maurice Ager - former professional basketball player
- Mark Aguirre - retired professional basketball player
- LaMarcus Aldridge - professional basketball player
- Cliff Alexander - professional basketball player
- Kwame Alexander - professional basketball player
- Jarrett Allen - professional basketball player
- Jerome Allen - former professional basketball player
- Lavoy Allen - professional basketball player
- Ray Allen - retired professional basketball player
- Tony Allen - professional basketball player
- Alan Anderson - professional basketball player
- James Anderson - professional basketball player
- Justin Anderson - professional basketball player
- Kenny Anderson - former professional basketball player
- Nick Anderson - retired professional basketball player
- Carmelo Anthony - professional basketball player, (African-American mother)
- Greg Anthony - retired professional basketball player
- Cole Anthony - basketball player (African American father)
- Nate Archibald - former professional basketball player
- Jim Ard - former professional basketball player
- Gilbert Arenas - retired professional basketball player
- B. J. Armstrong - former professional basketball player
- Darrell Arthur - professional basketball player
- Al Attles - former professional basketball player
- D. J. Augustin - professional basketball player
- Jeff Ayres - professional basketball player
- Ron Artest III

=== B ===
- Thurl Bailey—former professional basketball player
- Wade Baldwin IV—professional basketball player
- Lonzo Ball (African-American father)—professional basketball player
- LiAngelo Ball (African-American father)—professional basketball player
- LaMelo Ball (African-American father)—professional basketball player
- Gene Banks—retired professional basketball player
- Tony Barbee—former professional basketball player
- Charles Barkley—retired professional basketball player, member of the Naismith Memorial Basketball Hall of Fame
- Don Barksdale—former professional basketball player
- Harrison Barnes—professional basketball player
- Matt Barnes (African American father)—retired professional basketball player
- Earl Barron—professional basketball player
- Will Barton—professional basketball player
- Brandon Bass—professional basketball player
- Shane Battier—retired professional basketball player
- Elgin Baylor—former professional basketball player
- Kent Bazemore—professional basketball player
- Bradley Beal—professional basketball player
- Butch Beard—former professional basketball player
- Malik Beasley—professional basketball player
- Michael Beasley—professional basketball player
- Chris Bosh—professional basketball player
- Marvin Bagley—professional basketball player
- Mikal Bridges—professional basketball player
- Miles Bridges—professional basketball player
- Bruce Brown—professional basketball player
- Troy Brown Jr.—professional basketball player
- Jalen Brunson—professional basketball player
- Dwayne Bacon—professional basketball player
- Jordan Bell—professional basketball player
- Jaylen Brown—professional basketball player
- Antonio Blakeney—professional basketball player
- James Blackmon Jr.—professional basketball player
- Thomas Bryant—professional basketball player
- Isaiah Briscoe—professional basketball player
- Tony Bradley—professional basketball player
- Sterling Brown—professional basketball player
- Jabari Bird—professional basketball player
- Malcolm Brogdon—professional basketball player
- Jerryd Bayless—professional basketball player
- Jimmy Butler—professional basketball player
- Rasual Butler—former professional basketball player
- Aaron Brooks—professional basketball player
- Will Barton—professional basketball player
- MarShon Brooks—professional basketball player
- Walt Bellamy—former professional basketball player
- Kobe Bryant—retired professional basketball player
- Kwame Brown—professional basketball player
- Trey Burke—professional basketball player
- Reggie Bullock—professional basketball player
- Chauncey Billups—retired professional basketball player
- Muggsy Bogues—retired professional basketball player
- Terrell Brandon—retired professional basketball player
- Eric Bledsoe—professional basketball player
- Patrick Beverley—professional basketball player
- Avery Bradley—professional basketball player
- Chauncey Billups

=== C ===
- Dell Curry - former professional basketball player
- Stephen Curry - professional basketball player
- Seth Curry - professional basketball player
- Wilt Chamberlain - retired professional basketball player, Member of Naismith Memorial Basketball Hall of Fame, only NBA player to score 100 points
- Wendell Carter Jr. - professional basketball player
- DeMarcus Cousins - professional basketball player
- Ian Clark - professional basketball player
- Norris Cole - professional basketball player
- Quinn Cook - professional basketball player
- Jevon Carter - professional basketball player
- Vince Carter - professional basketball player
- Jordan Clarkson (African-American father) - professional basketball player
- Tony Carr - professional basketball player
- Bryant Crawford - professional basketball player
- Jamal Crawford - professional basketball player
- John Collins - professional basketball player
- Marquese Chriss - professional basketball player
- Tyson Chandler - professional basketball player
- Isaiah Canaan - professional basketball player
- Mario Chalmers - professional basketball player
- Jordan Crawford - professional basketball player
- Jarrett Culver - professional basketball player

=== D ===
- Anthony Davis - professional basketball player
- Antonio Davis - former professional basketball player
- Ed Davis - professional basketball player
- Glen Davis - former professional basketball player
- Adrian Dantley - retired professional basketball player
- Andre Drummond - professional basketball Player
- Baron Davis - retired professional basketball player
- Deyonta Davis - professional basketball player
- Dewayne Dedmon - professional basketball player
- DeMar DeRozan - professional basketball player
- Erick Dampier - former professional basketball player
- Spencer Dinwiddie - professional basketball player
- Clyde Drexler - retired professional basketball player
- Kevin Durant - professional basketball player
- Kris Dunn - professional basketball player
- PJ Dozier - professional basketball player
- Troy Daniels - professional basketball player
- Trevon Duval - professional basketball player

=== E ===
- Jawun Evans - professional basketball player
- Tyreke Evans - professional basketball player
- Reggie Evans - retired professional basketball player
- Julius Erving - retired professional basketball player, member of the Naismith Memorial Basketball Hall of Fame

=== F ===
- De'Aaron Fox - professional basketball player
- Kay Felder - professional basketball player
- Markelle Fultz - professional basketball player
- Terrance Ferguson - professional basketball player
- Yogi Ferrell - professional basketball player

=== G ===
- Horace Grant - retired professional basketball player
- Hal Greer - retired professional basketball player
- George Gervin - retired professional basketball player, member of the Naismith Memorial Basketball Hall of Fame
- Harry Giles - professional basketball player
- Kevin Garnett - retired professional basketball player
- Paul George - professional basketball player
- Michael Kidd-Gilchrist - professional basketball player
- Ben Gordon (Africans-Americans mother) - Basketball player

=== H ===
- Elvin Hayes - retired professional basketball player
- Anfernee "Penny" Hardaway - retired professional basketball player
- Happy Hairston - former professional basketball player
- PJ Hairston - professional basketball player
- Dwight Howard - professional basketball player
- Grant Hill - retired professional basketball player, member of Naismith Memorial Basketball Hall of Fame
- James Harden - professional basketball player
- Josh Hart - professional basketball player
- Tobias Harris - professional basketball player
- Tyrese Haliburton - professional basketball player
- Ron Harper - retired professional basketball player
- Rodney Hood - professional basketball player
- Udonis Haslem - professional basketball player
- John Henson - professional basketball player
- Montrezl Harrell - professional basketball player
- Jrue Holiday - professional basketball player
- Justin Holiday - professional basketball player
- Aaron Holiday - professional basketball player
- De'Andre Hunter - professional basketball player
- Larry Hughes - retired professional basketball player
- Richard Hamilton - retired professional basketball player
- Solomon Hill

=== I ===
- Allen Iverson - retired professional basketball player, member of the Naismith Memorial Basketball Hall of Fame
- Brandon Ingram - professional basketball player
- Kyrie Irving - professional basketball player

=== J ===
- DeAndre Jordan - professional basketball player
- Derrick Jones Jr. - professional basketball player
- Josh Jackson - professional basketball player
- Frank Jackson (African-American father) - professional basketball player
- K.C. Jones - retired professional basketball player
- Sam Jones - retired professional basketball player
- Tyus Jones (African-American father) - professional basketball player
- Jaren Jackson - retired professional basketball player
- Jaren Jackson Jr. - professional basketball player
- LeBron James - professional basketball player
- Dennis Johnson - former professional basketball player
- Magic Johnson - retired professional basketball player, member of Naismith Memorial Basketball Hall of Fame
- Michael Jordan - retired professional basketball player, member of Naismith Memorial Basketball Hall of Fame, considered as the greatest player in NBA History.
- Amile Jefferson - professional basketball player
- Jarrett Jack - professional basketball player
- Reggie Jackson

=== K ===
- Brandon Knight - professional basketball player
- Kevin Knox II - professional basketball player
- Jason Kidd - retired professional basketball player (African-American father)
- Kemba Walker - professional basketball player (African-American mother)

=== L ===
- Bob Lanier - retired professional basketball player
- Damian Lillard - professional basketball player
- Kawhi Leonard - professional basketball player
- Kyle Lowry - professional basketball player
- Rashard Lewis - retired professional basketball player
- Caris LeVert - professional basketball player
- Earl Lloyd - first African-American NBA player (professional basketball player), desegregated the NBA

=== M ===
- Bob McAdoo - retired professional basketball player and coach
- CJ McCollum - professional basketball player
- Alonzo Mourning - retired professional basketball player, member of the Naismith Memorial Basketball Hall of Fame
- Donovan Mitchell - professional basketball player
- Ja Morant - professional basketball player
- Karl Malone - retired professional basketball player, member of the Naismith Memorial Basketball Hall of Fame
- Moses Malone - former professional basketball player, member of Naismith Memorial Basketball Hall of Fame
- Cedric Maxwell - retired professional basketball player
- Malik Monk - professional basketball player
- Reggie Miller - retired professional basketball player, member of the Naismith Memorial Basketball Hall of Fame
- Tracy McGrady - retired professional basketball player, member of the Naismith Memorial Basketball Hall of Fame
- Earl Monroe - retired professional basketball player
- Marcus Morris - professional basketball player
- Markieff Morris - professional basketball player
- Khris Middleton - professional basketball player
- Shawn Marion
- Wesley Matthews - professional basketball player

=== N ===
- Aaron Nesmith
- Georges Niang
- Malik Newman - professional basketball player

=== O ===
- Charles Oakley - former professional basketball player
- Jahlil Okafor - professional basketball player
- Kelly Oubre Jr.
- Shaquille O'Neal - retired professional basketball player, member of Naismith Memorial Basketball Hall of Fame

=== P ===
- Robert Parish - retired professional basketball player
- Chris Paul - professional basketball player
- Gary Payton - retired professional basketball player, member of the Naismith Memorial Basketball Hall of Fame
- Anthony Parker
- Jabari Parker (African-American father) - professional basketball player
- Sonny Parker
- Tony Parker (African-American father) - professional basketball player
- Kendrick Perkins - former professional basketball player
- Sam Perkins - former professional basketball player
- Paul Pierce - retired professional basketball player
- Scottie Pippen - former professional basketball player, member of the Naismith Memorial Basketball Hall of Fame
- Scotty Pippen Jr.- (African-American father) - professional basketball player
- Tayshaun Prince
- Taurean Prince
- Jordan Poole

=== R ===
- Bill Russell - former professional basketball player, member of the Naismith Memorial Basketball Hall of Fame
- Cam Reddish - basketball player
- Willis Reed - retired professional basketball player, coach and manager
- Doc Rivers - retired professional basketball player, NBA head coach
- Austin Rivers (African American father) - professional basketball player
- Derrick Rose - professional basketball player
- D'Angelo Russell - professional basketball player
- Dennis Rodman - retired professional basketball player, member of Naismith Memorial Basketball Hall of Fame
- Jalen Rose - retired professional basketball player
- Oscar Robertson - former professional basketball player, member of the Naismith Memorial Basketball Hall of Fame
- Rajon Rondo - professional basketball player
- Terrence Ross - professional basketball player
- Terry Rozier - professional basketball player
- Josh Richardson - professional basketball player
- Clifford Robinson - former professional basketball player
- David Robinson - former professional basketball player

=== S ===
- John Salley - former professional basketball player
- Satch Sanders - former professional basketball player
- Anfernee Simons - professional basketball player
- Caleb Swanigan - professional basketball player
- Dennis Smith Jr. - professional basketball player
- Dennis Scott - retired professional basketball player
- Iman Shumpert - professional basketball player
- Kenny Smith - retired professional basketball player
- John Salmons - retired professional basketball player
- John Salley - retired professional basketball player
- Collin Sexton - professional basketball player
- Marcus Smart - professional basketball player
- Omari Spellman - professional basketball player
- JR Smith - professional basketball player
- Lance Stephenson - professional basketball player
- Eric Snow - former professional basketball player and coach
- Jerry Stackhouse - retired professional basketball player

=== T ===
- Gary Trent - former professional basketball player
- Gary Trent Jr. - professional basketball player
- Isiah Thomas - retired professional basketball player, member of the Naismith Memorial Basketball Hall of Fame
- Isaiah Thomas - professional basketball player
- David Thompson - retired professional basketball player
- Jayson Tatum - professional basketball player
- Karl-Anthony Towns (African-American father) - professional basketball player
- Jason Terry - professional basketball player
- Klay Thompson
- Myles Turner - professional basketball player
- Wayman Tisdale - former professional basketball player
- Terry Taylor

=== U ===
- Wes Unseld - retired professional basketball player

=== W ===
- Chris Webber - retired professional basketball player
- Dwyane Wade - professional basketball player
- Dominique Wilkins
- Earl Watson
- Gerald Wilkins
- John Wall - professional basketball player
- Russell Westbrook - professional basketball player
- Justise Winslow - professional basketball player
- T. J. Warren - professional basketball player
- Dion Waiters - professional basketball player
- Jamaal Wilkes - retired professional basketball player
- Lenny Wilkens - retired professional basketball player
- Zion Williamson - basketball player
- Lou Williams - professional basketball player
- Patrick Williams professional basketball player
- Marvin Williams - professional basketball player
- Hassan Whiteside - professional basketball player
- Coby White - professional basketball player
- James Worthy - retired professional basketball player
- Mitchell Wiggins

=== Y ===
- Trae Young (African-American father) - professional basketball player

== Boxing ==
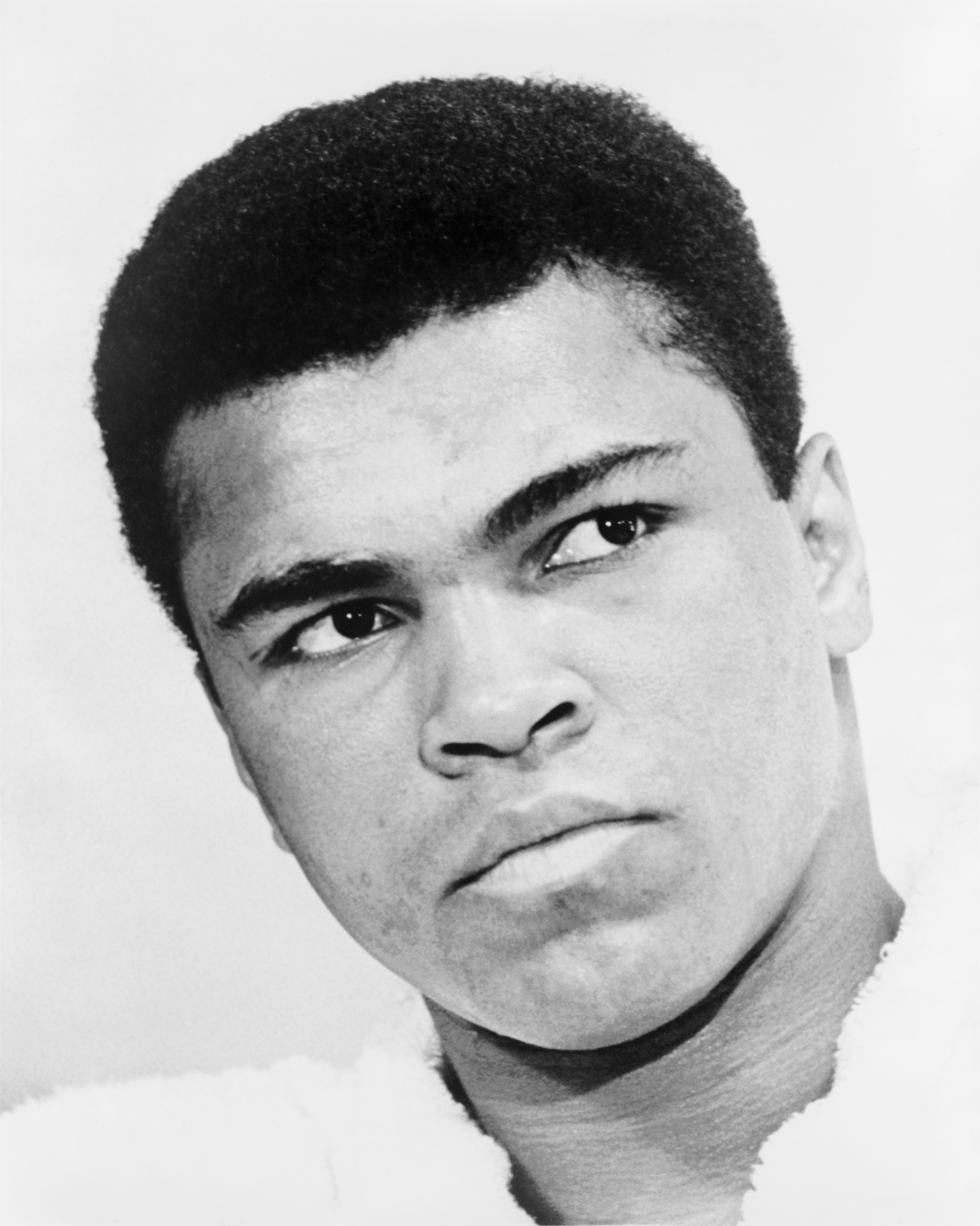
Muhammad Ali

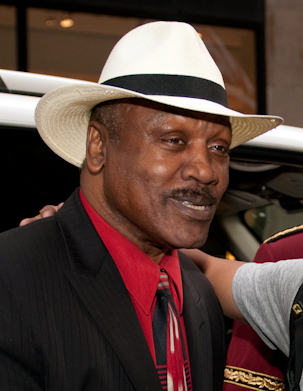
Joe Frazier

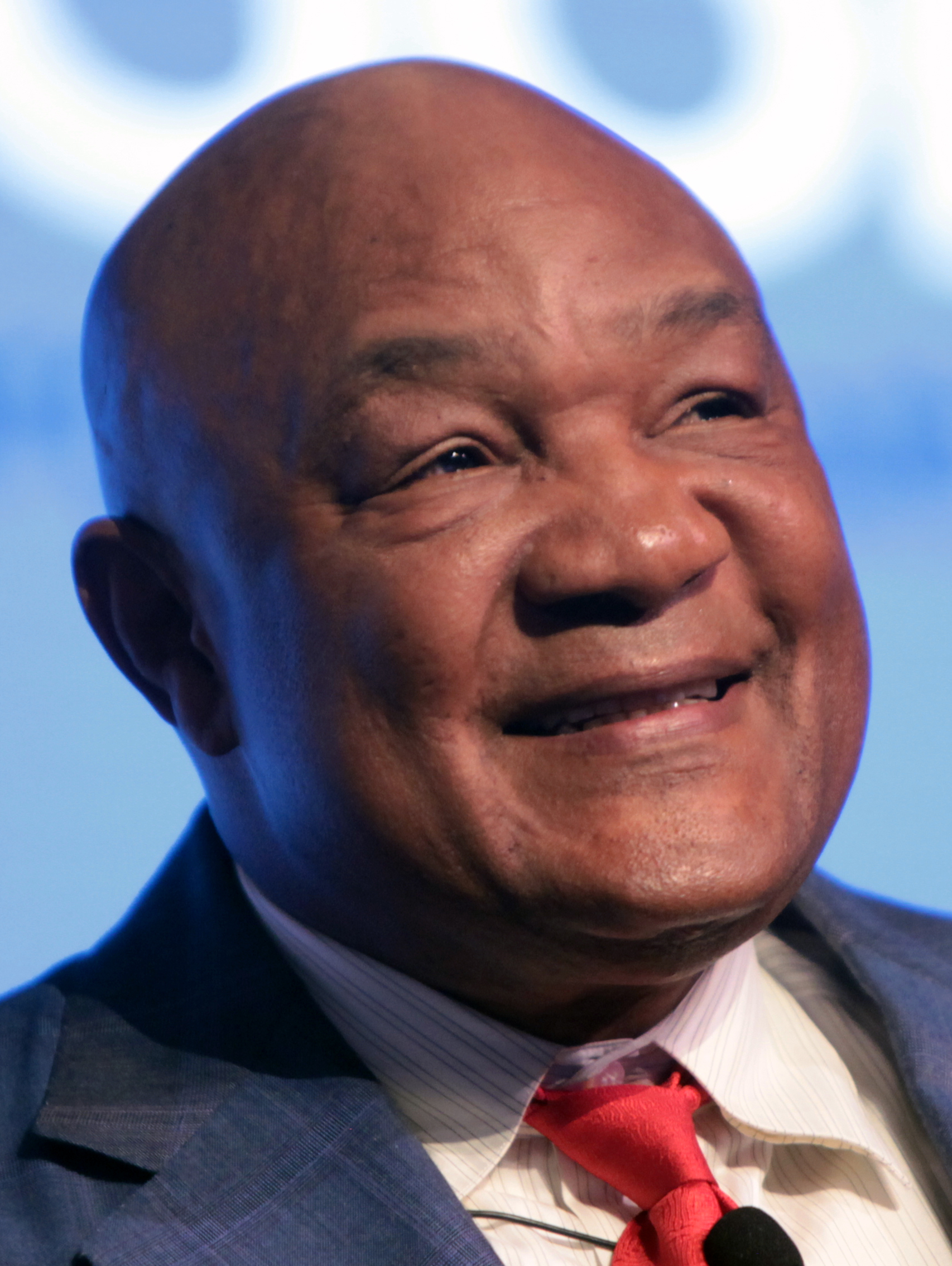
George Foreman

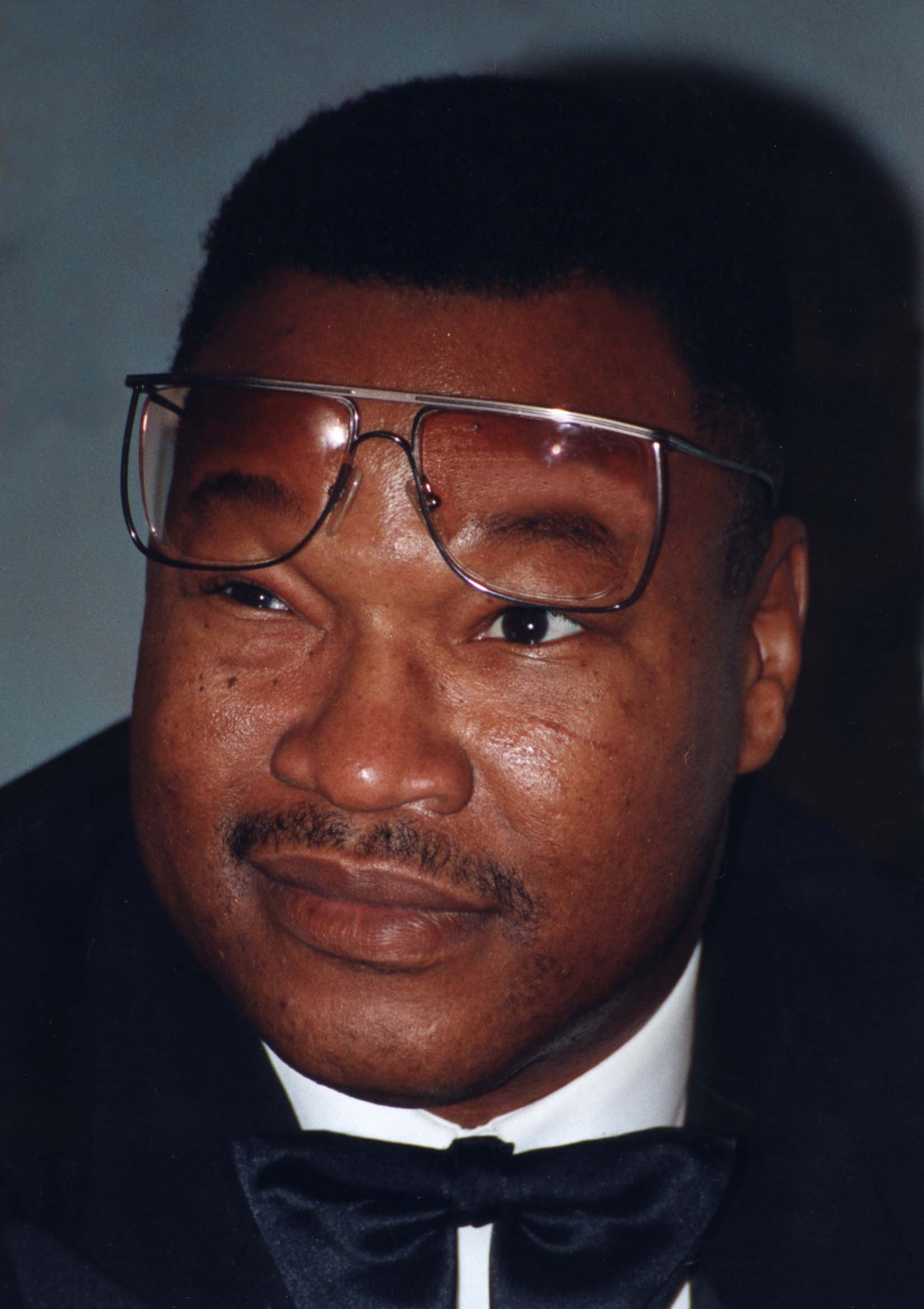
Larry Holmes

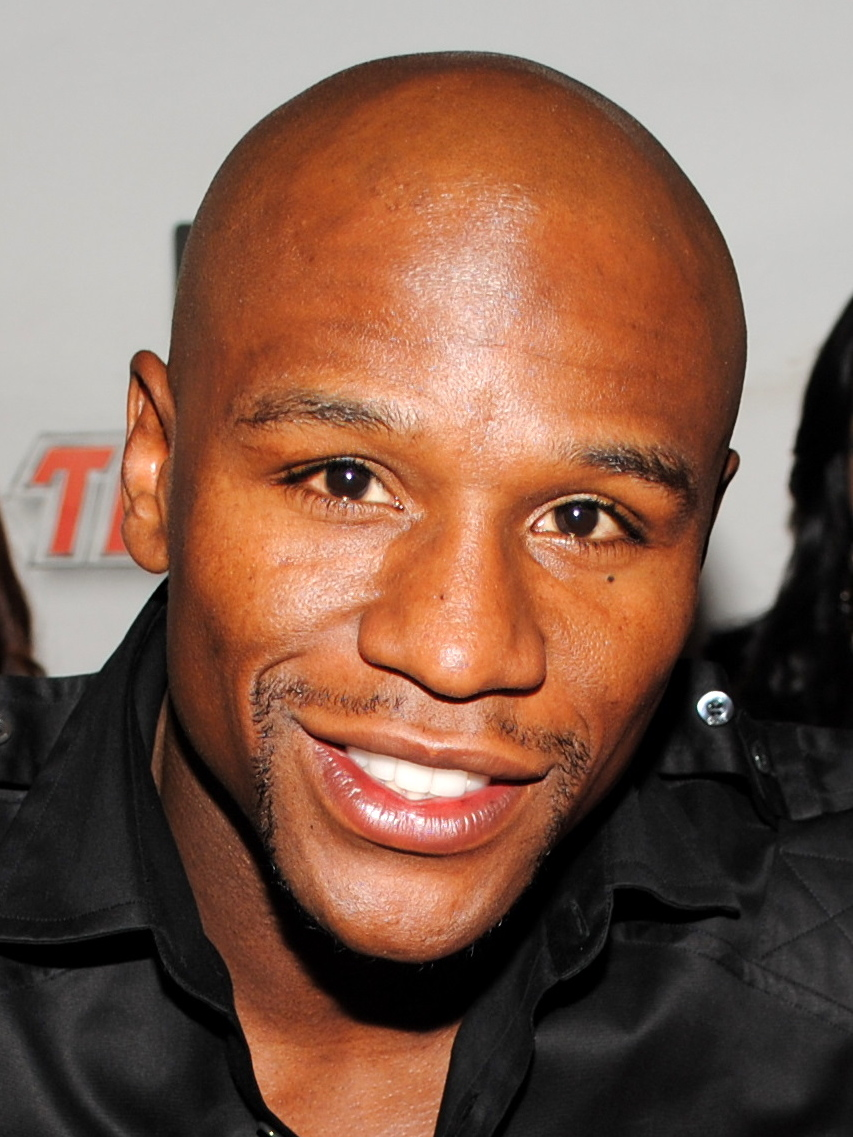
Floyd Mayweather Jr.

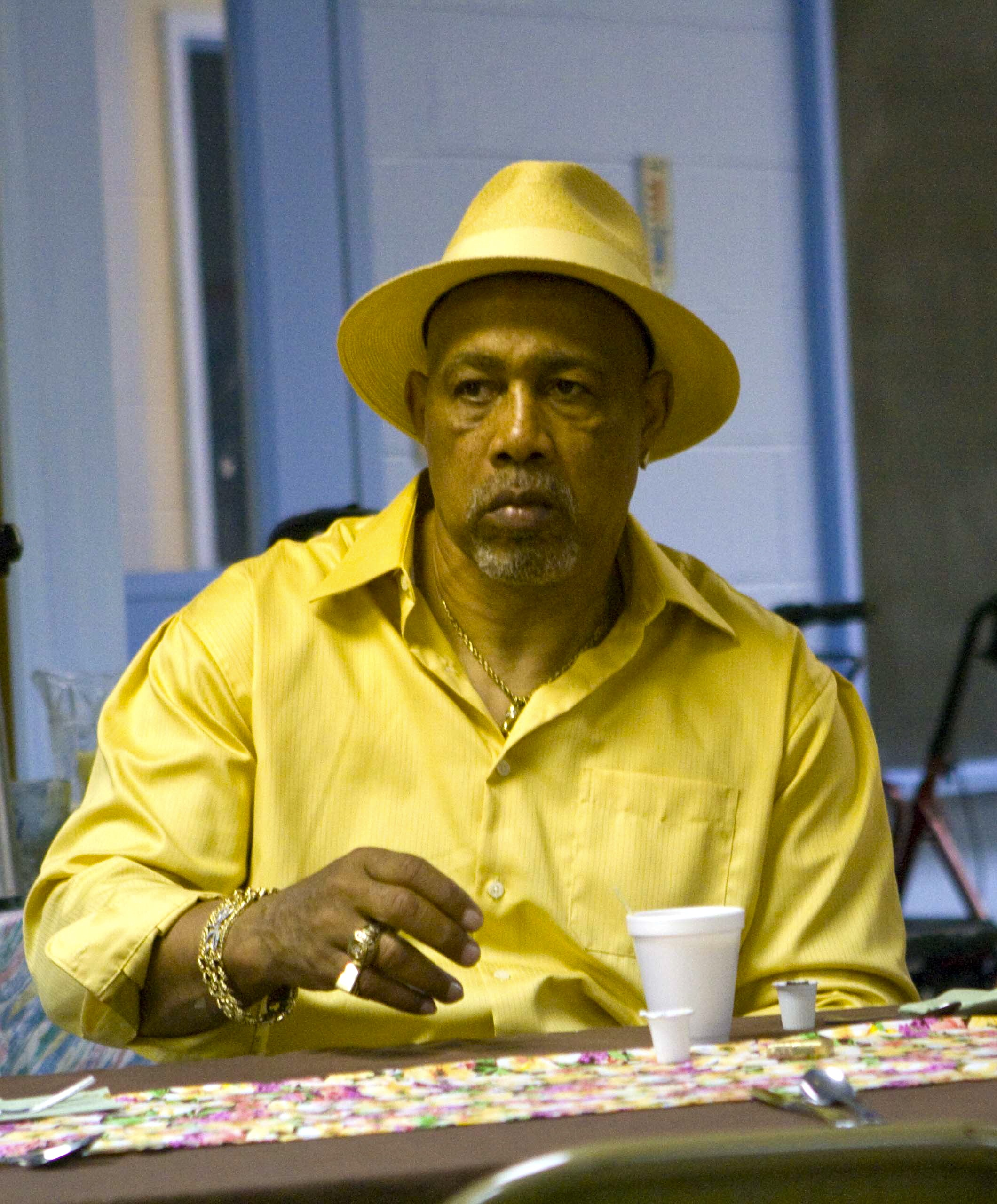
Ken Norton

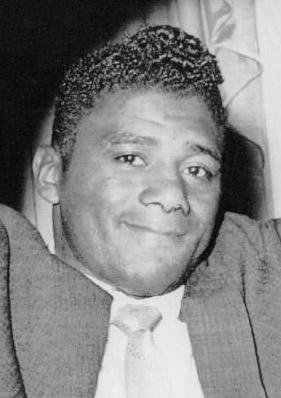
Floyd Patterson

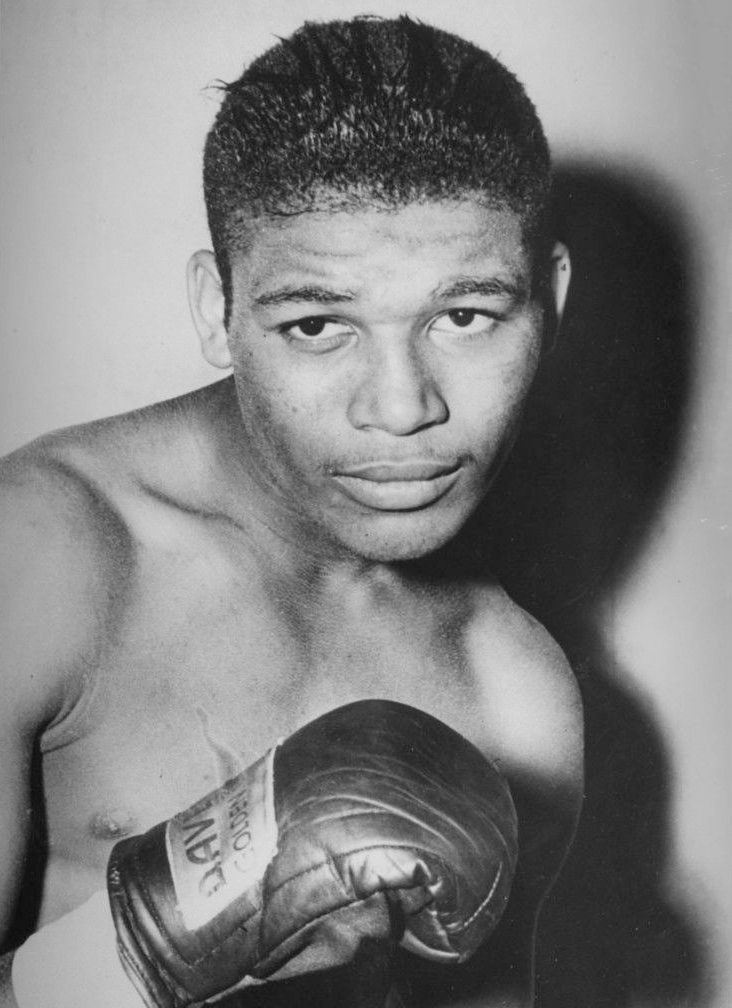
Sugar Ray Robinson

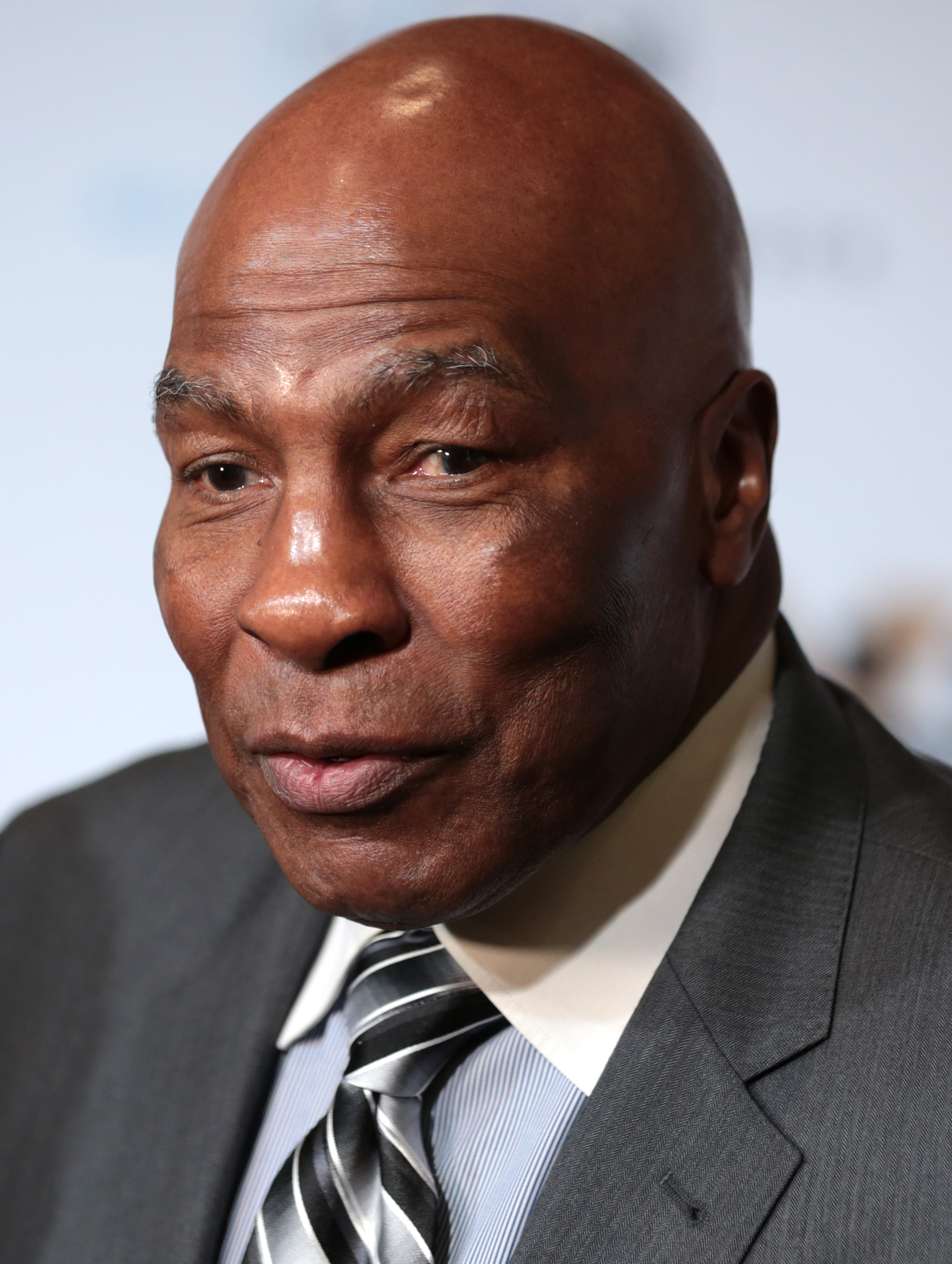
Earnie Shavers

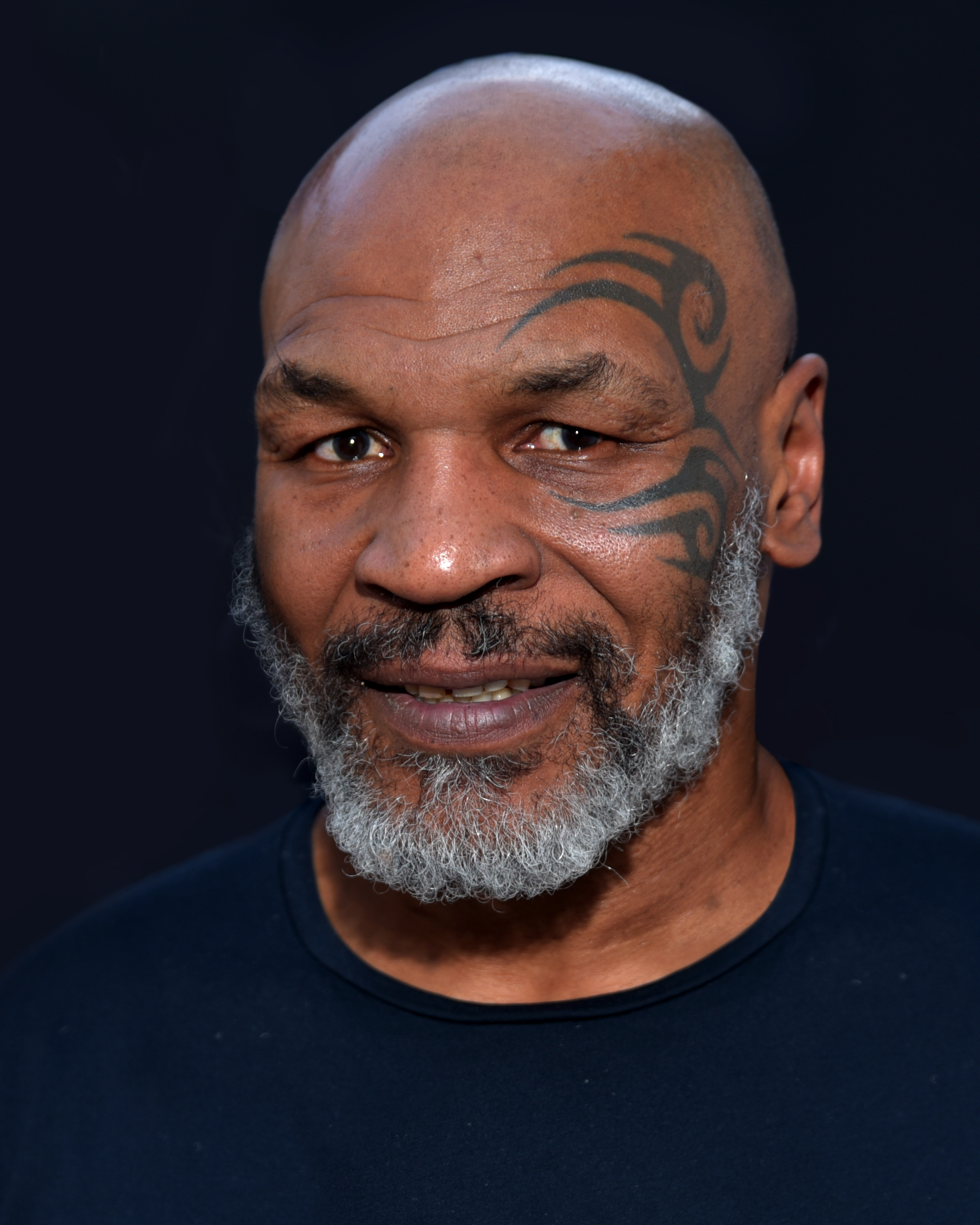
Mike Tyson

=== A ===
- DeAndrey Abron, former professional boxer
- Devon Alexander, professional boxer
- Laila Ali, former professional boxer
- Muhammad Ali, former professional boxer, activist, philanthropist, recognized as the greatest athlete of all time
- Rahaman Ali, former professional boxer
- Demetrius Andrade, professional boxer
- Henry Armstrong, professional boxer
- Emanuel Augustus, former professional boxer

=== B ===
- Johnathon Banks, former professional boxer
- Johnny Banks, former professional boxer
- Kelcie Banks, former professional boxer
- Sonny Banks, former professional boxer
- Riddick Bowe, former professional boxer
- Timothy Bradley, former professional boxer
- Maurice Brantley, former professional boxer
- Lamon Brewster, former professional boxer
- Shannon Briggs, professional boxer
- Adrien Broner, professional boxer
- Joe Brown, former professional boxer
- Trevor Bryan, former professional boxer
- Chris Byrd, former professional boxer

=== C ===
- Jermall Charlo, professional boxer
- Jermell Charlo, professional boxer
- Terence Crawford, professional boxer
- Steve Cunningham, former professional boxer

=== D ===
- Gervonta Davis, professional boxer
- Howard Davis Jr., former professional boxer
- Anthony Dirrell, professional boxer
- Michael Dokes, former professional boxer
- Larry Donald, former professional boxer
- Joseph Dorsey Jr., former professional boxer
- Buster Douglas, former professional boxer

=== E ===
- Jimmy Ellis, professional boxer
- Jaron Ennis, professional boxer

=== F ===
- George Foreman, former professional boxer
- Joe Frazier, former professional boxer
- Stephen Fulton, professional boxer

=== G ===
- Derrick Gainer, former professional boxer
- George Godfrey, former professional boxer
- Joshua Greer Jr., former professional boxer

=== H ===
- Marvelous Marvin Hagler, former professional boxer
- Devin Haney, professional boxer
- Tony Harrison, professional boxer
- Thomas Hearns, former professional boxer
- Jamel Herring, professional boxer
- Larry Holmes, former professional boxer
- Evander Holyfield, former professional boxer
- Maurice Hooker, professional boxer
- Bernard Hopkins, former professional boxer
- Jarrett Hurd, former professional boxer

=== I ===
- Amir Imam, professional boxer

=== J ===
- Beau Jack, former lightweight boxer
- Daniel Jacobs, professional boxer
- Jack Johnson, former professional boxer
- Roy Jones Jr., former professional boxer
- Zab Judah, professional boxer

=== K ===
- James Kinchen, former professional boxer

=== L ===
- Sugar Ray Leonard, former professional boxer
- John Henry Lewis, former professional boxer
- Sonny Liston, professional boxer
- Rocky Lockridge, former professional boxer
- Joe Louis, former professional boxer
- Ron Lyle, professional boxer

=== M ===
- Floyd Mayweather Sr., former professional boxer
- Floyd Mayweather Jr., former professional boxer
- Roger Mayweather, former professional boxer
- Oliver McCall, professional boxer
- Ray Mercer, former professional boxer
- Bob Montgomery, former lightweight boxer
- Archie Moore, professional boxer
- Shane Mosley, former professional boxer

=== N ===
- Ken Norton, former professional boxer

=== P ===
- Floyd Patterson, former professional boxer
- Shawn Porter, professional boxer
- Aaron Pryor, professional boxer

=== Q ===
- Dwight Muhammad Qawi, former professional boxer

=== R ===
- Hasim Rahman, former professional boxer
- Sugar Ray Robinson, professional boxer
- Gary Russell Jr., professional boxer

=== S ===
- Ed Sanders, former professional boxer
- Earnie Shavers, former professional boxer
- Errol Spence Jr., professional boxer
- Cory Spinks, former professional boxer
- Leon Spinks, former professional boxer
- Michael Spinks, former professional boxer
- Shakur Stevenson, professional boxer

=== T ===
- Jermain Taylor, former professional boxer
- Keith Thurman, professional boxer
- James Toney, former professional boxer
- Austin Trout, professional boxer
- Caleb Truax, professional boxer
- Tony Tucker, former professional boxer
- Mike Tyson, former professional boxer

=== W ===
- Andre Ward, former professional boxer
- Pernell Whitaker, professional boxer
- Deontay Wilder, professional boxer
- Tim Witherspoon, former professional boxer
- Chalky Wright, former professional boxer
- Winky Wright, former professional boxer

== Fencing ==
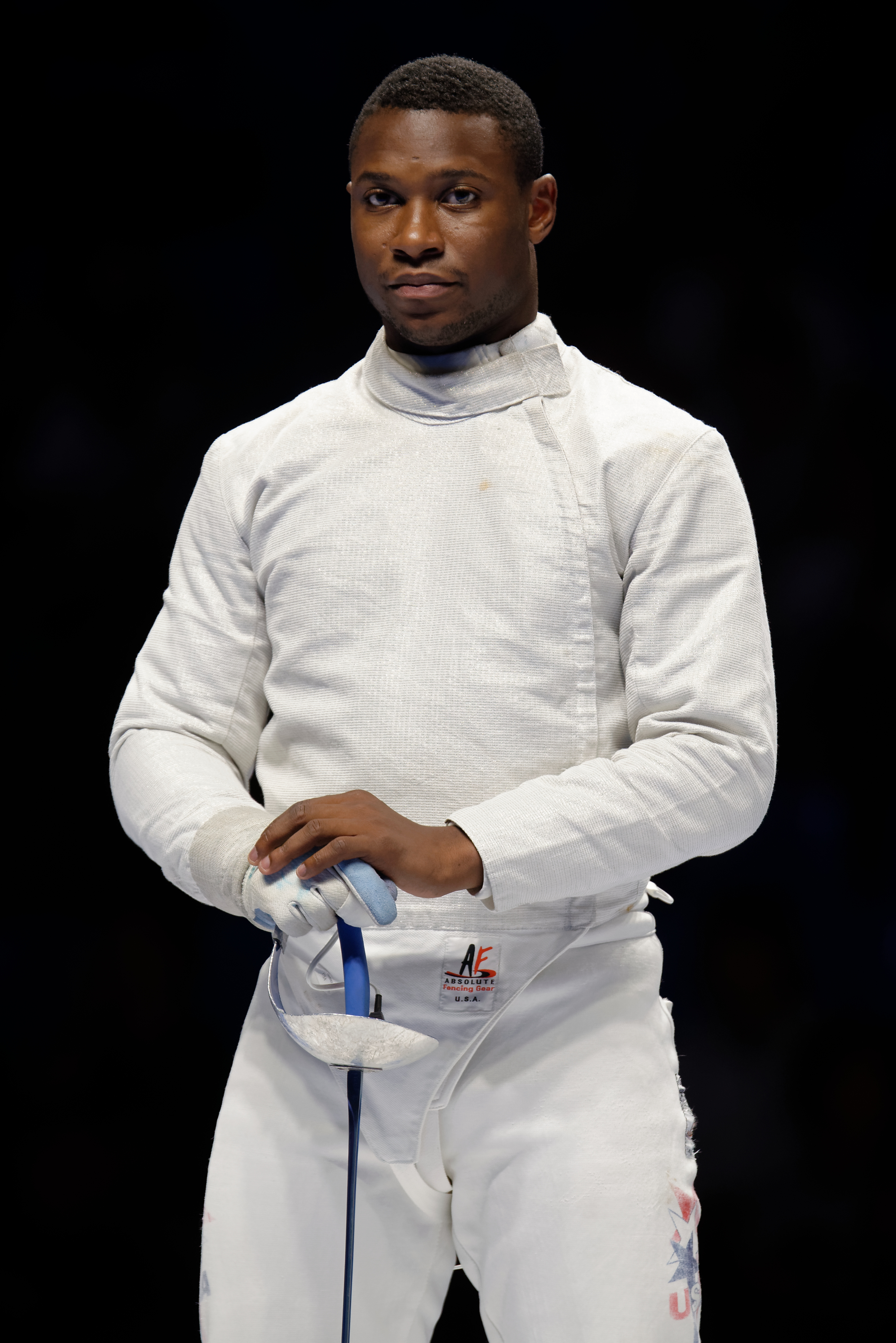
Daryl Homer

- Miles Chamley-Watson, foil fencer
- Nikki Franke, foil fencer and coach
- Daryl Homer, saber fencer
- Uriah Jones, foil fencer
- Curtis McDowald, épée fencer
- Sharon Monplaisir, foil fencer
- Ibtihaj Muhammad, foil fencer
- Lauren Scruggs, foil fencer
- Erinn Smart, foil fencer
- Keeth Smart, saber fencer
- Ruby Watson, saber and épée fencer and 2025 USA Fencing Hall of Fame nominee
- Peter Westbrook (1952–2024), saber fencer, founder of the Peter Westbrook Foundation
- Ruth White, retired fencer

== Football ==
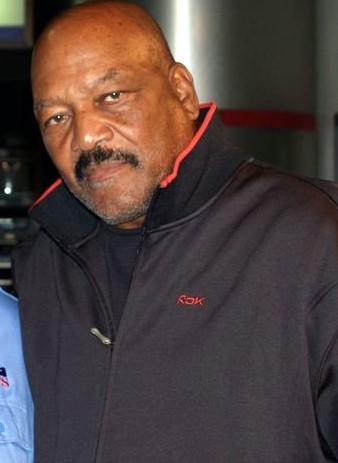
Jim Brown

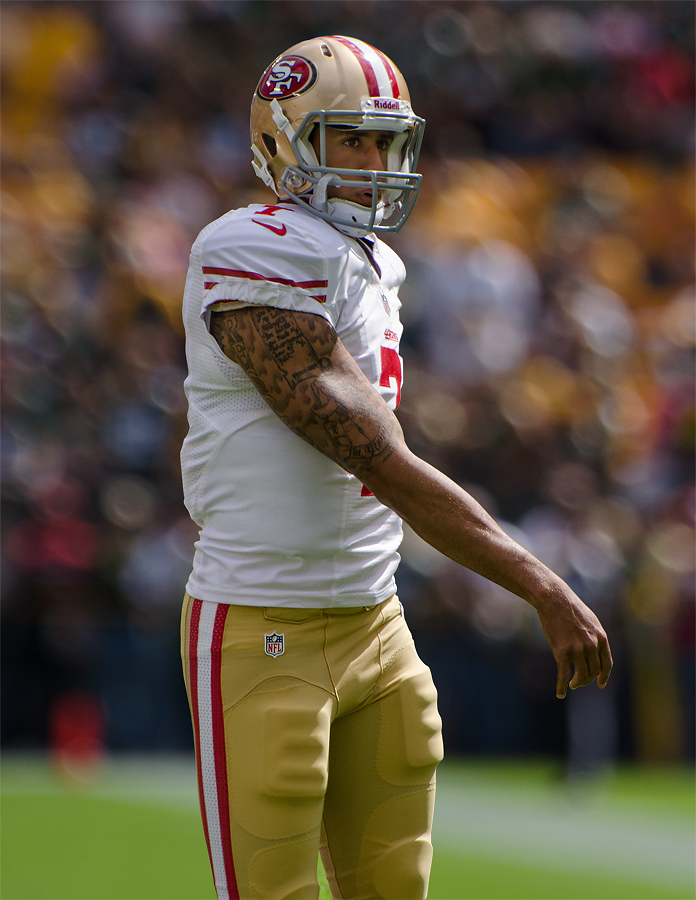
Colin Kaepernick

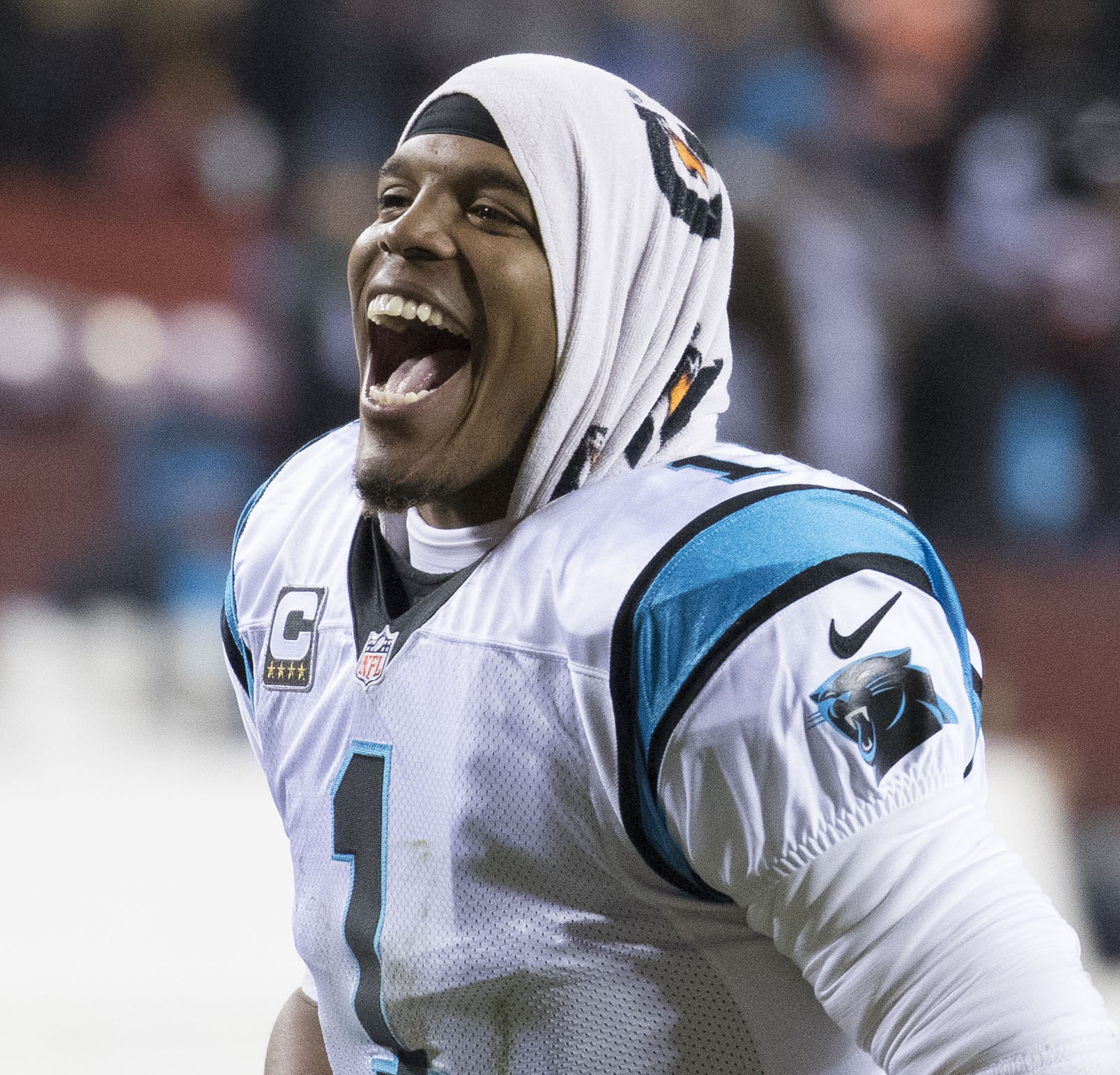
Cam Newton

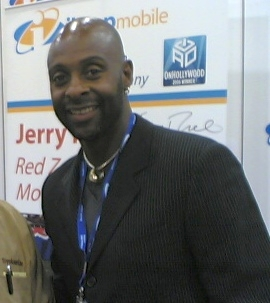
Jerry Rice

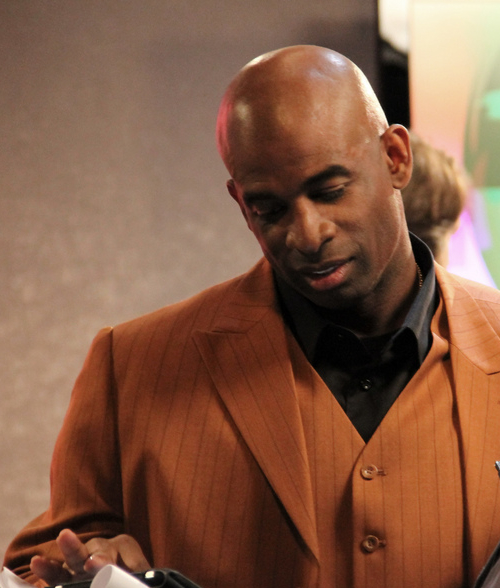
Deion Sanders

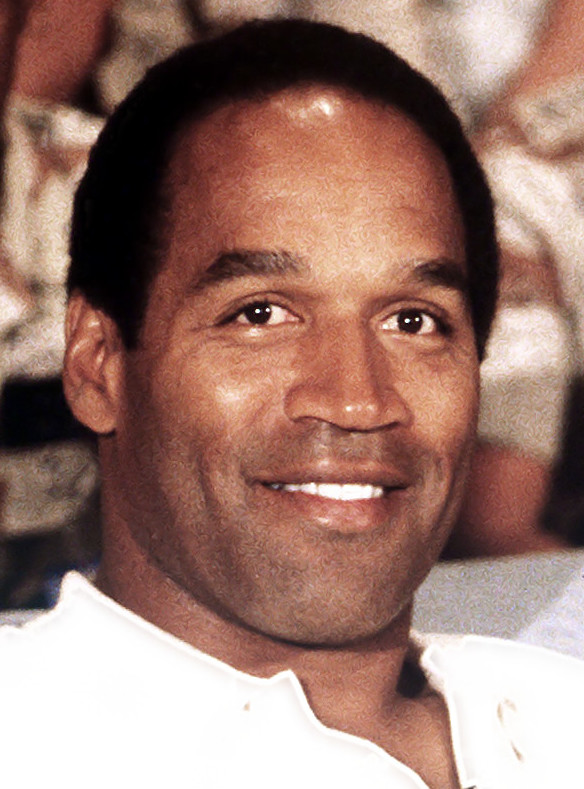
O. J. Simpson

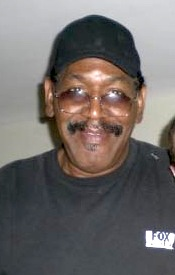
Bubba Smith

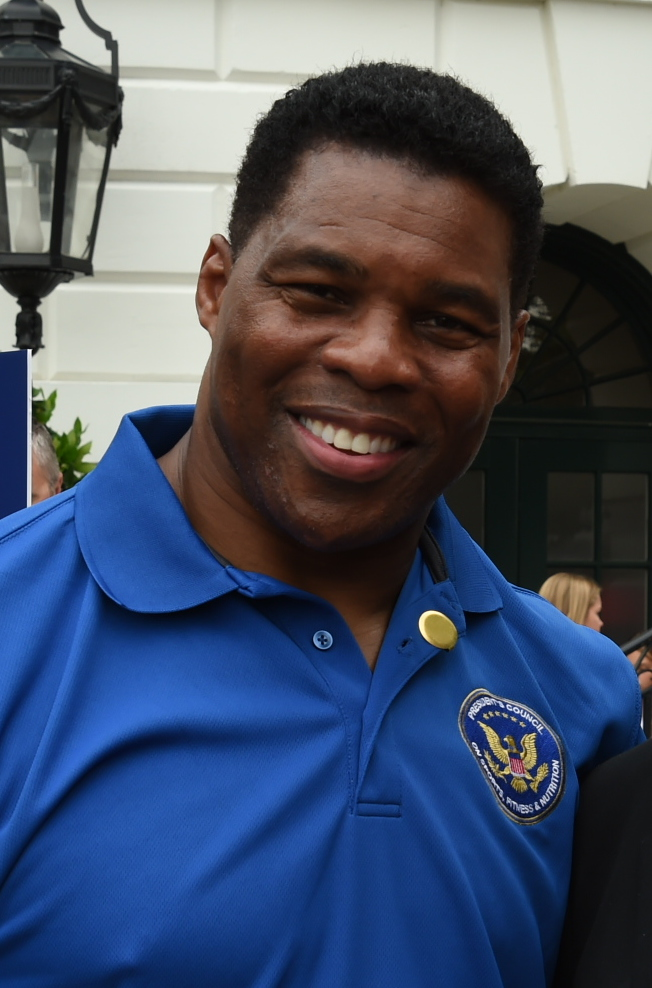
Herschel Walker

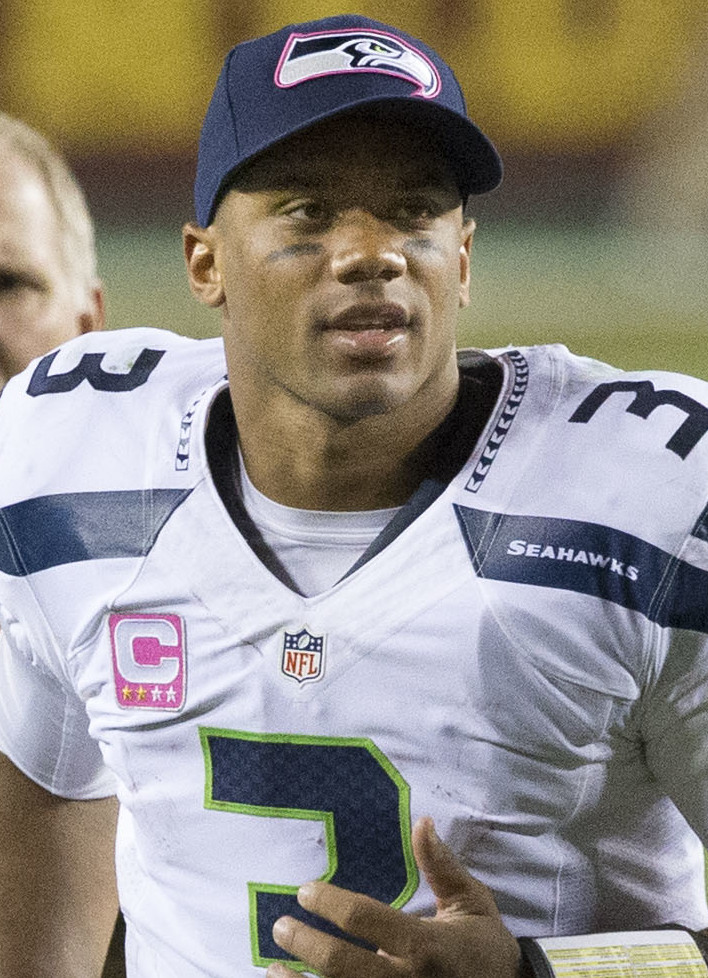
Russell Wilson

=== B ===
- Antonio Brown, professional football player
- Jim Brown, retired professional football player, member of the Pro Football Hall of Fame
- Dez Bryant, professional football player
- Odell Beckham Jr., professional football player
- Le'Veon Bell, professional football player
- Cedric Benson, professional football player
- Sergio Brown

=== C ===
- Saahdiq Charles
- Yodny Cajuste

=== E ===
- Akayleb Evans
- Ezekiel Elliott - professional football player

=== G ===
- Rosey Grier - retired professional football player
- Mel Groomes - former professional football player

=== H ===
- Dwayne Haskins - professional football player

=== I ===
- Michael Irvin - former professional football player, member of the Pro Football Hall of Fame

=== J ===
- Edwin Jackson - former professional football player
- Jerry Jeudy - professional football player
- Lamar Jackson - professional football player
- Willie Jeffries - former player and head football coach of South Carolina State University, member of the College Football Hall of Fame
- Deacon Jones - former professional football player

=== K ===
- Colin Kaepernick (African-American father) - professional football player

=== L ===
- Ray Lewis - retired professional football player, member of Pro Football Hall of Fame
- Floyd Little - professional football player
- Marshawn Lynch - retired football player

=== M ===
- Bob Mann - former professional football player
- Khalil Mack - professional football player
- Kyler Murray - professional football player
- Patrick Mahomes - professional football player
- Marion Motley - former professional football player, member of the Pro Football Hall of Fame
- Randy Moss - retired professional football player, member of the Pro Football Hall of Fame

=== N ===
- Cam Newton - professional football player

=== O ===
- Dayo Odeyingbo
- Terrell Owens - retired professional football player, member of the Pro Football Hall of Fame

=== P ===
- Dak Prescott - professional football player
- Walter Payton - former professional football player, member of Pro Football Hall of Fame
- Joe Perry - former professional football player, member of the Pro Football Hall of Fame
- Micah Parsons
- Terrelle Pryor
- Fritz Pollard - former professional football player, member of the Pro Football Hall of Fame

=== S ===
- Barry Sanders - former professional football player, member of the Pro Football Hall of Fame
- Deion Sanders - former professional football & baseball player, member of the Pro Football Hall of Fame
- Gale Sayers - former professional football player
- Marcus Spears - former professional football player
- Warren Sapp - retired professional football player
- O. J. Simpson - former professional football player
- Bubba Smith - former professional football player
- Woody Strode - former professional football player
- Terrell Suggs - professional football player

=== T ===
- George Taliaferro - former professional football player

=== V ===
- Michael Vick - retired professional football player

=== W ===
- Damien Woody - retired professional football player
- Jameis Winston - professional football player
- Russell Wilson - professional football player
- Bill Willis - former professional football player, member of the Pro Football Hall of Fame
- Hines Ward (African American father) - retired professional football player
- Deshaun Watson - professional football player
- Herschel Walker - retired professional football player
- Kenny Washington - former professional football player
- Fred Williamson - retired professional football player
- Carl Weathers - retired professional football player
- Wesley Woodyard

== Golf ==
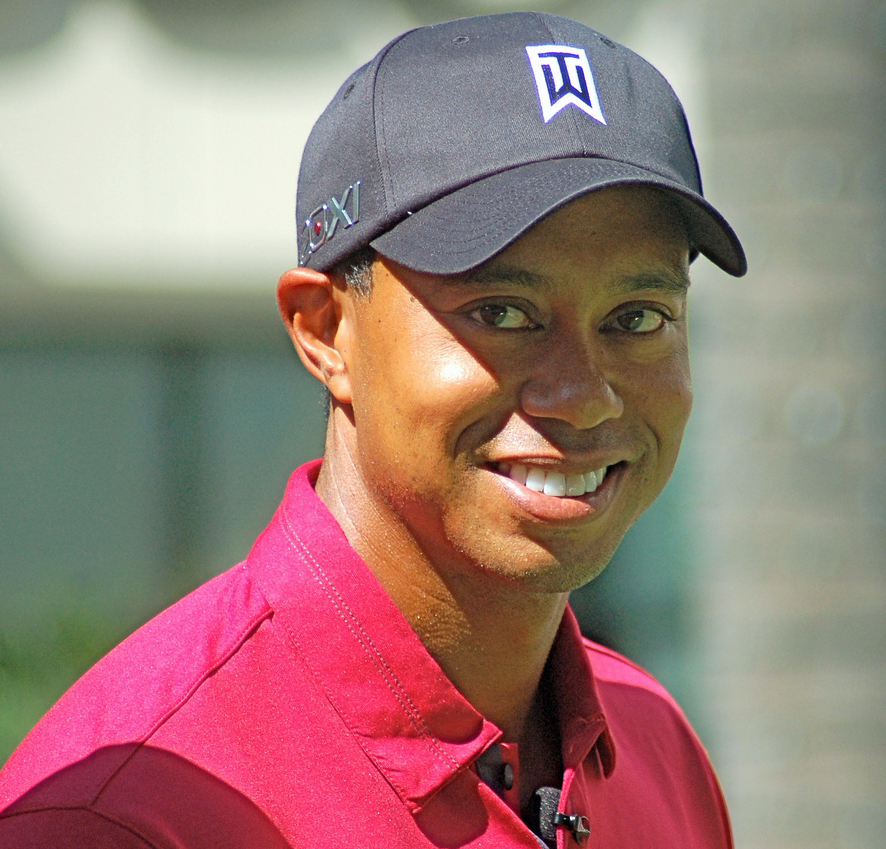
Tiger Woods

- Jerry Bruner, professional golfer
- Althea Gibson, former professional golfer
- Calvin Peete, former professional golfer
- Renee Powell, professional golfer
- Charlie Sifford, professional golfer
- Bill Spiller, former professional golfer
- Jim Thorpe, professional golfer
- Tiger Woods (African American father), professional golfer, winner of 14 major championships
- Harold Varner III, professional golfer

== Gymnastics ==
- Simone Biles, gymnast
- Dominique Dawes
- Gabby Douglas
- Kyla Ross
- Tasha Schwikert

== Hockey ==
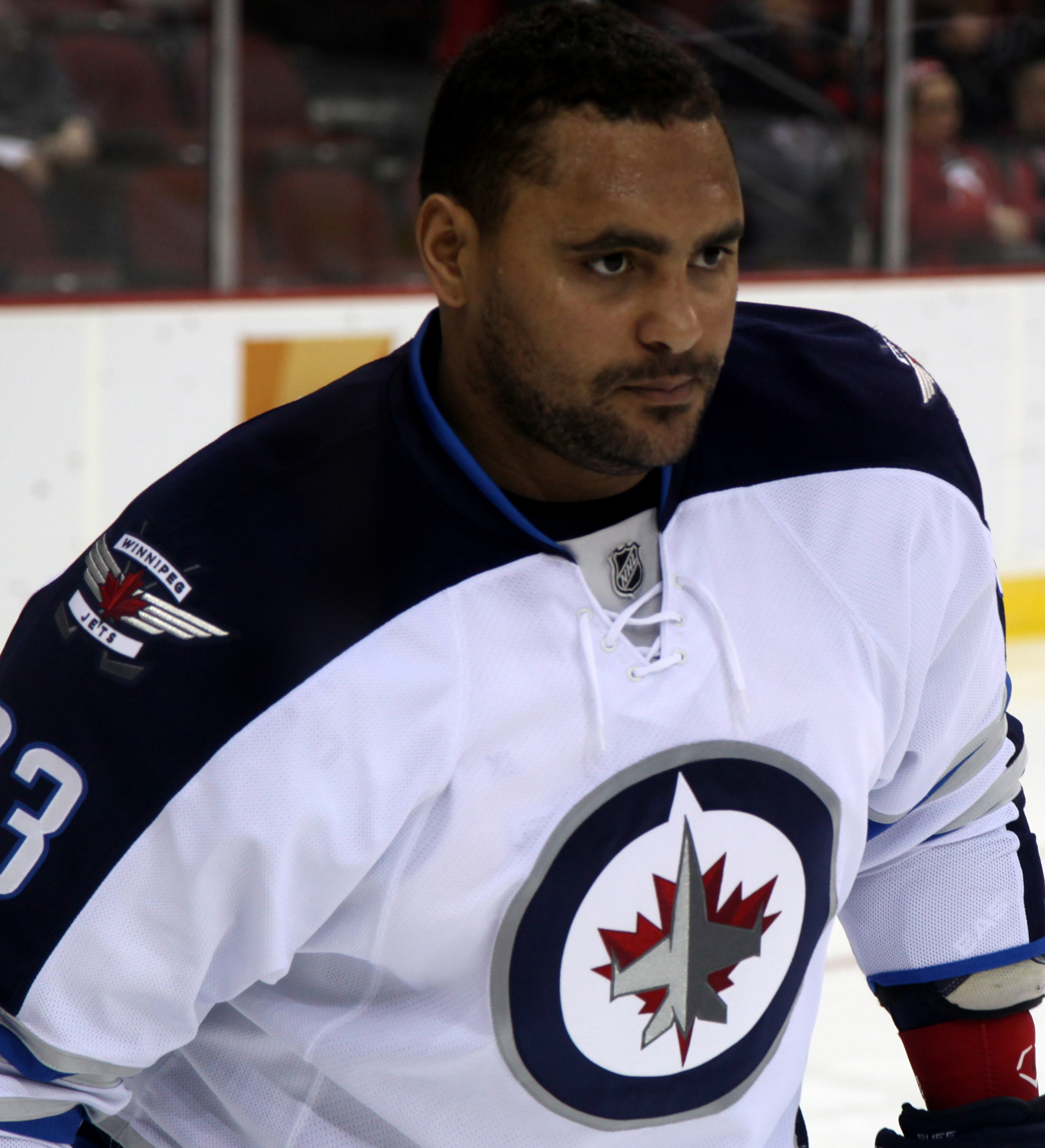
Dustin Byfuglien

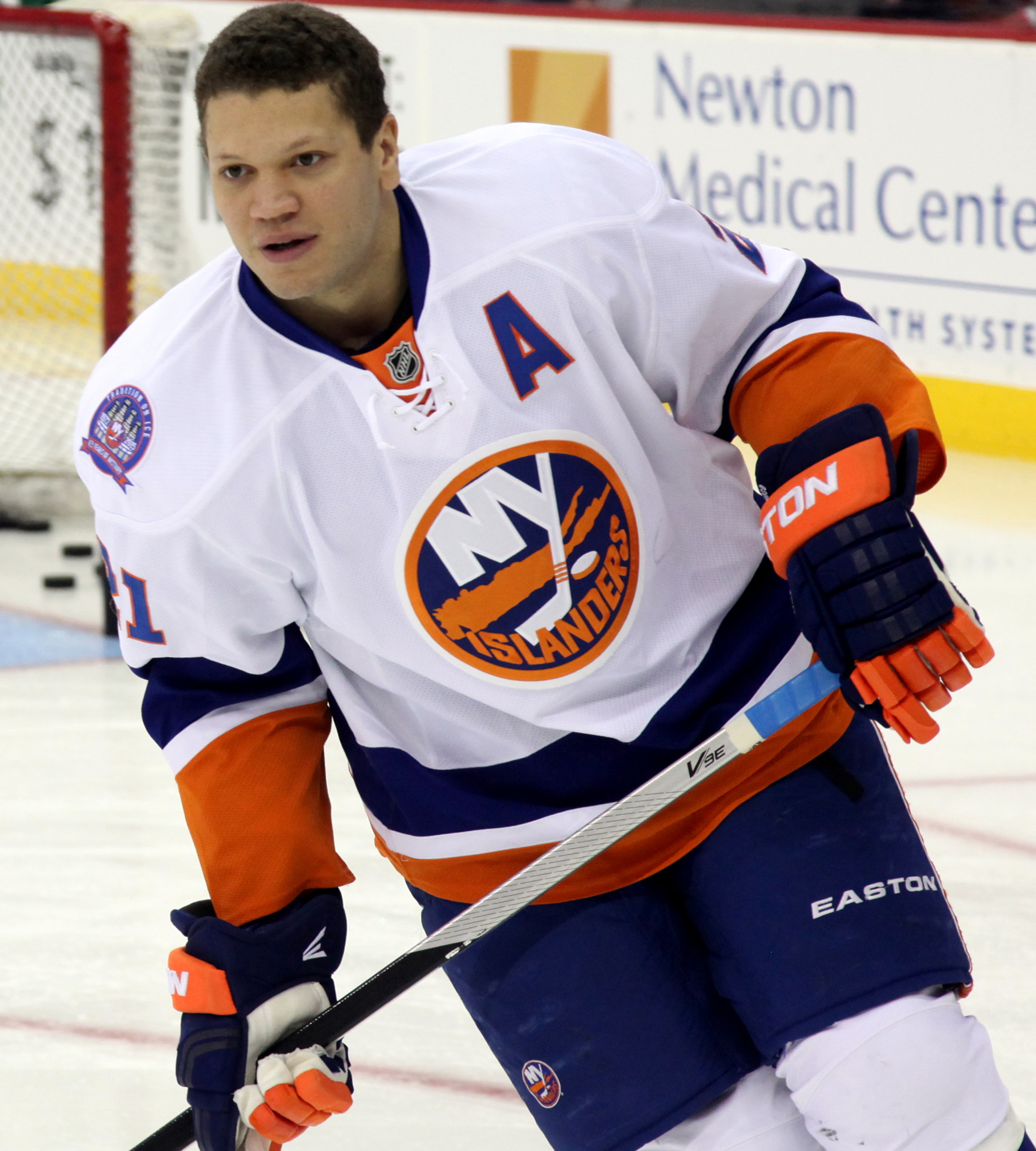
Kyle Okposo

- Justin Bailey
- Blake Bolden
- Francis Bouillon
- Donald Brashear
- J. T. Brown
- Dustin Byfuglien
- Gerald Coleman
- Robbie Earl
- Emerson Etem
- Jordan Greenway
- Mike Grier
- Val James
- Justin Johnson
- Caleb Jones
- Seth Jones
- Greg Mauldin
- K'Andre Miller
- Nyjer Morgan
- Justin Morrison
- Kyle Okposo
- Jordan Samuels-Thomas
- C. J. Suess
- Scooter Vaughan
- Shawn Wheeler
- Charles Williams

== Swimming ==
- Cullen Jones
- Simone Manuel
- Lia Neal
- David Curtiss
- Sybil Smith

== Tennis ==
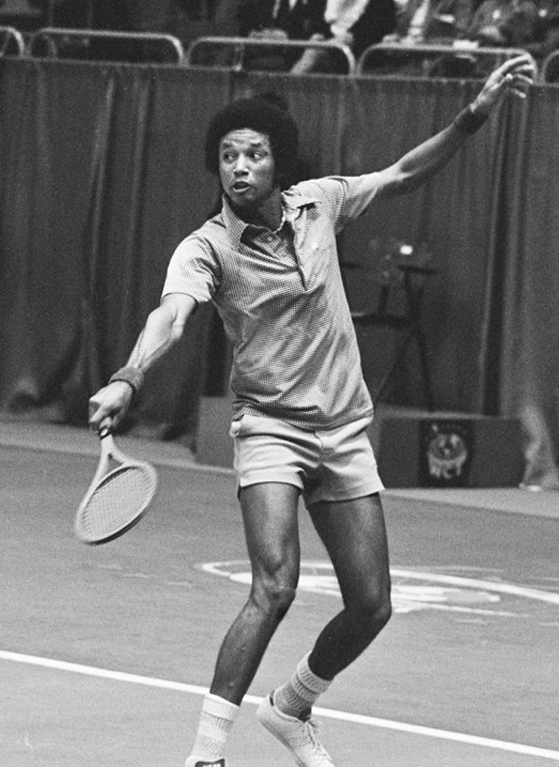
Arthur Ashe

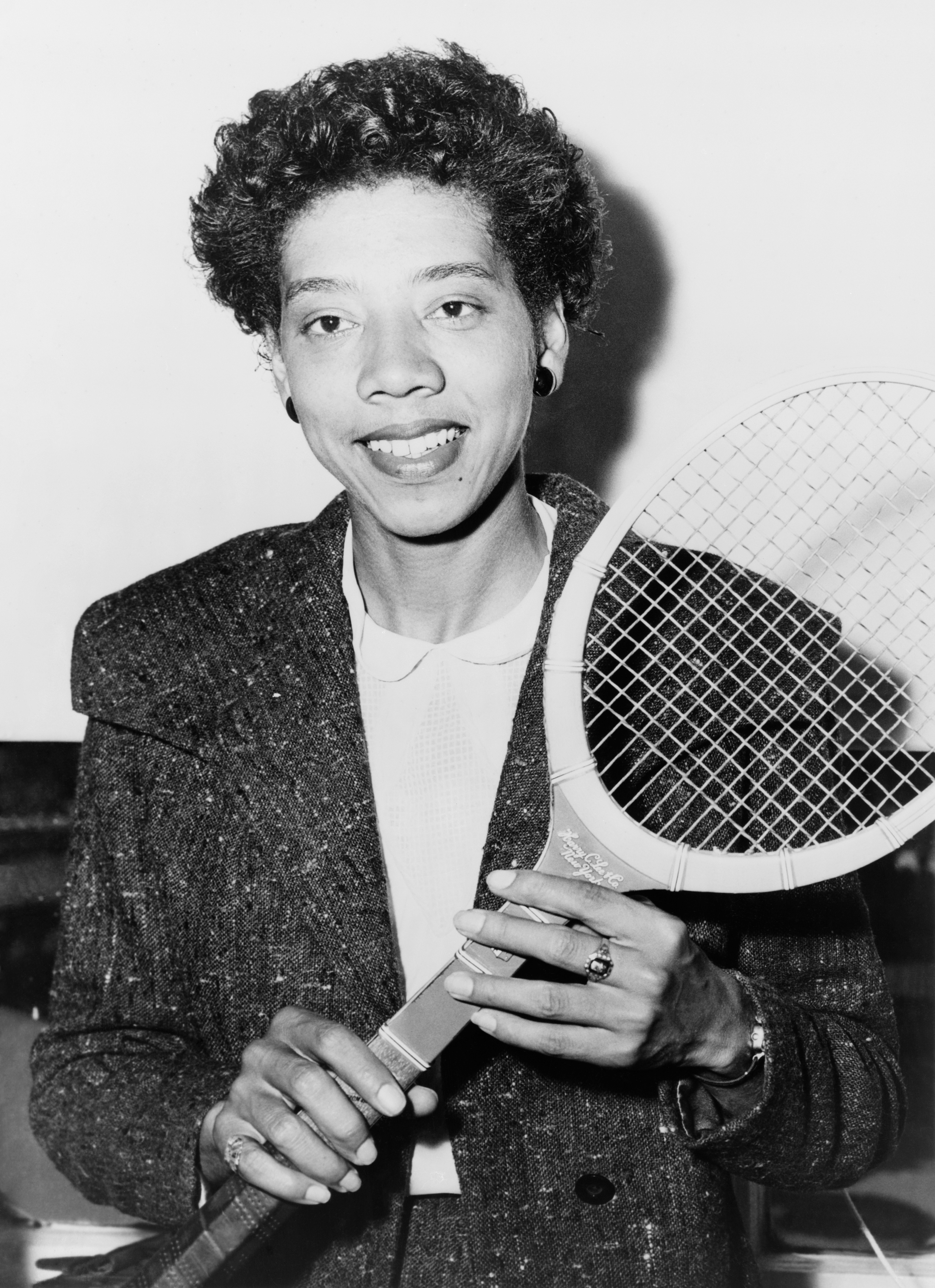
Althea Gibson

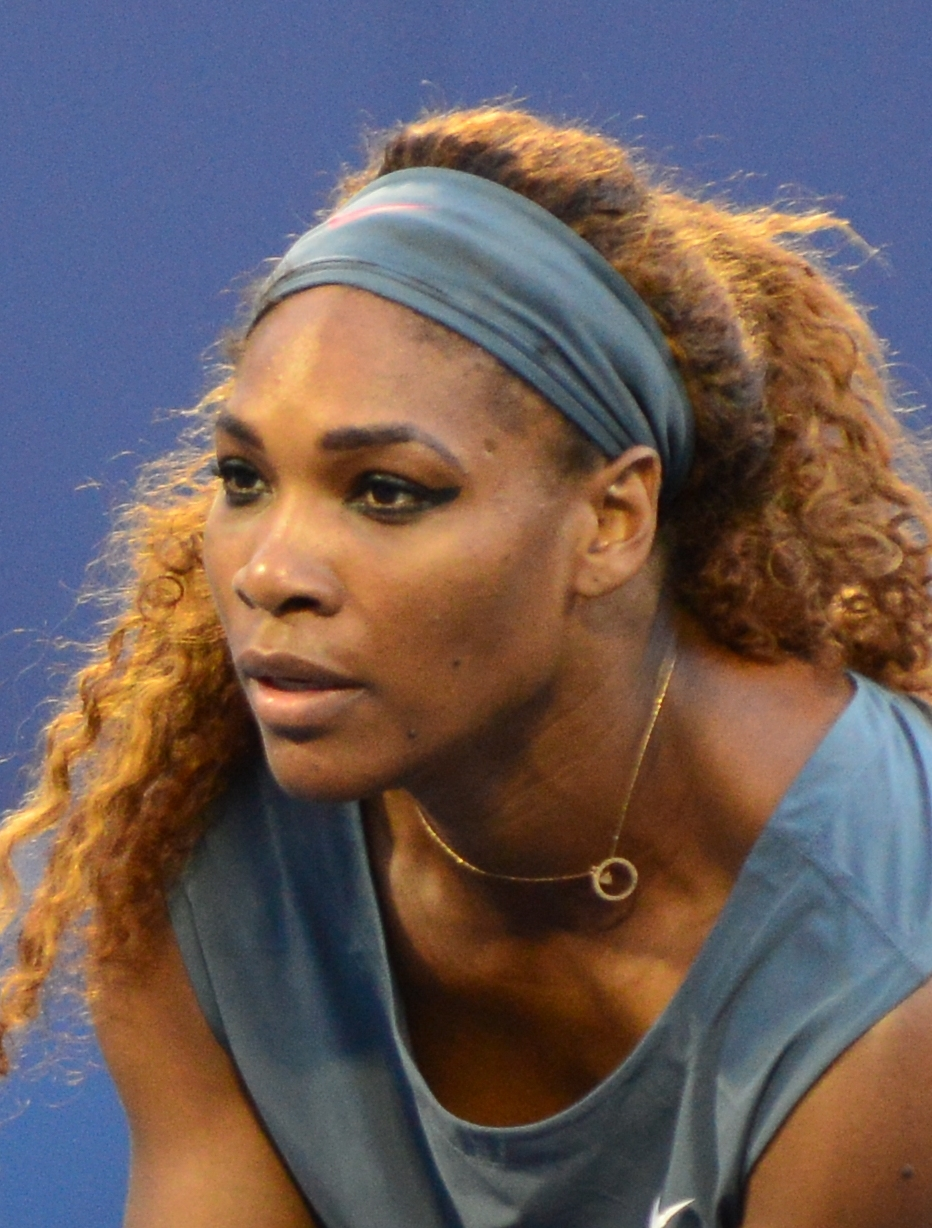
Serena Williams

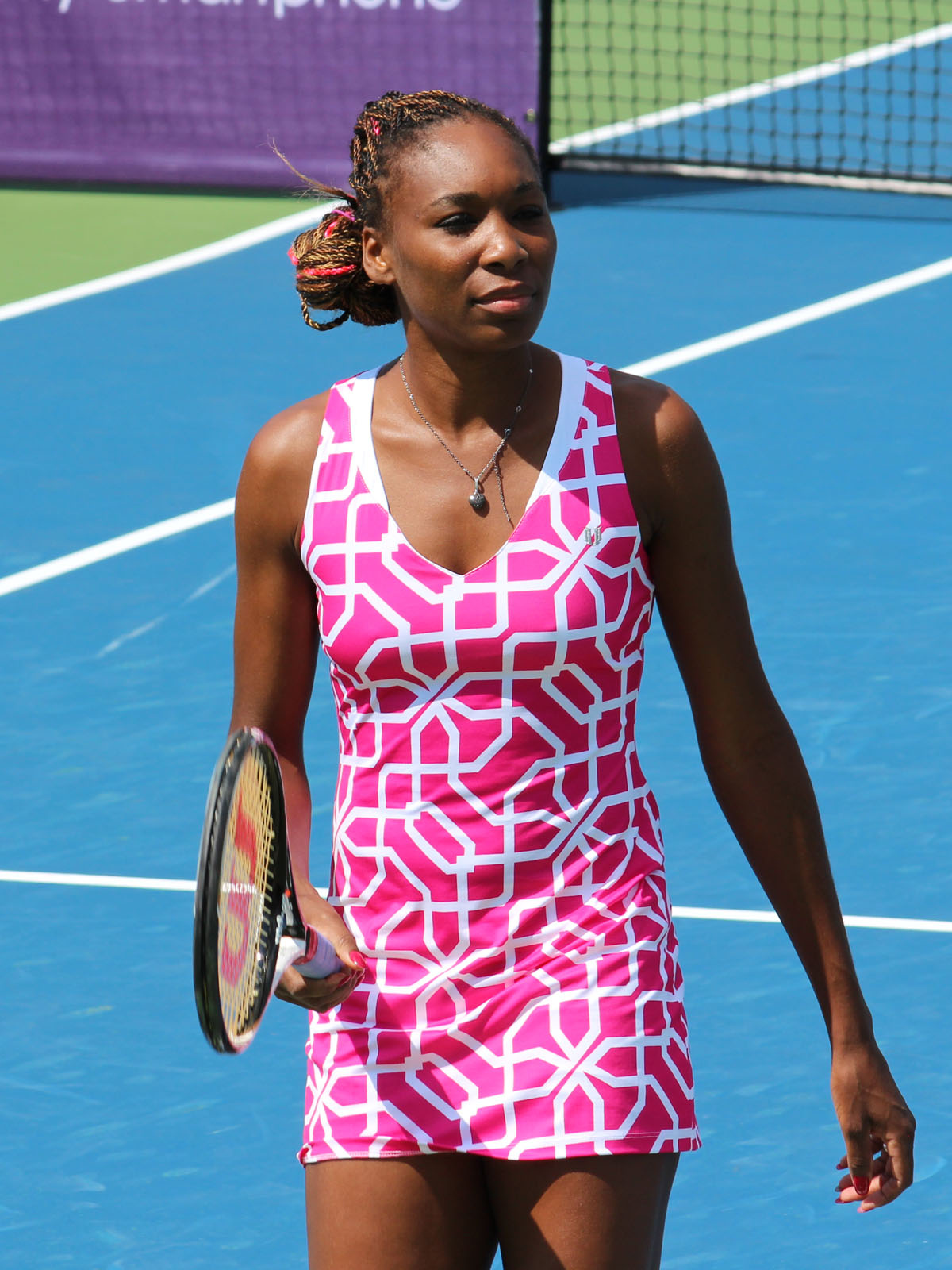
Venus Williams

=== A ===
- Arthur Ashe - retired professional tennis player

=== B ===
- James Blake - professional tennis player

=== G ===
- Zina Garrison - retired professional tennis player
- Althea Gibson - retired professional tennis player
- Coco Gauff - professional tennis player

=== J ===
- Jarmere Jenkins - retired professional tennis player

=== K ===
- Madison Keys - professional tennis player

=== M ===
- Nicholas Monroe - professional tennis player

=== R ===
- Chanda Rubin - professional tennis player

=== S ===
- Bryan Shelton - retired professional tennis player

=== T ===
- Taylor Townsend - professional tennis player

=== S ===
- Sloane Stephens - professional tennis player

=== W ===
- Mashona Washington - retired professional tennis player
- Richard Williams - professional tennis coach
- Serena Williams - professional tennis player
- Venus Williams - professional tennis player

=== Y ===
- Donald Young - professional tennis player

== Track and field ==
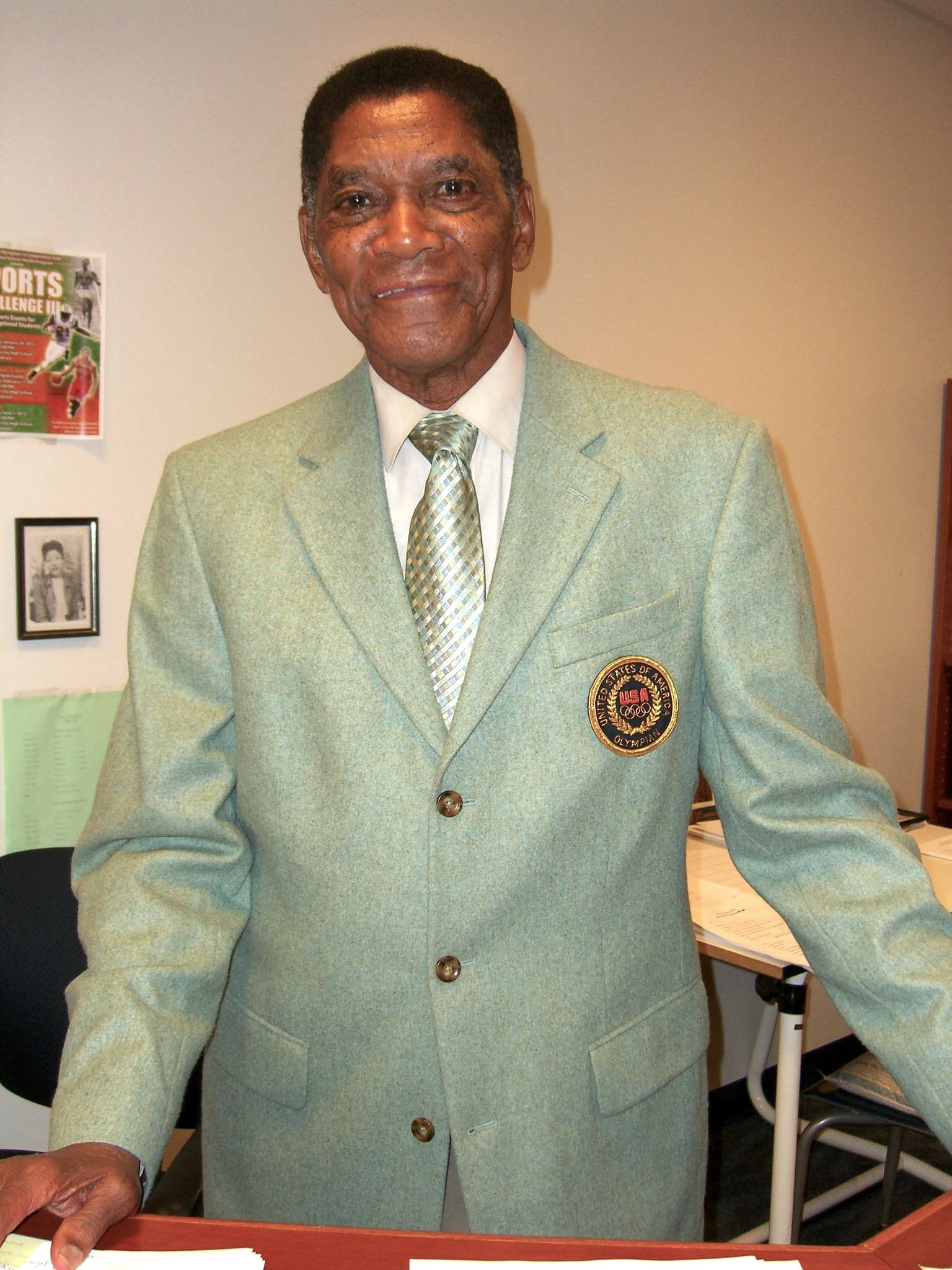
Otis Davis

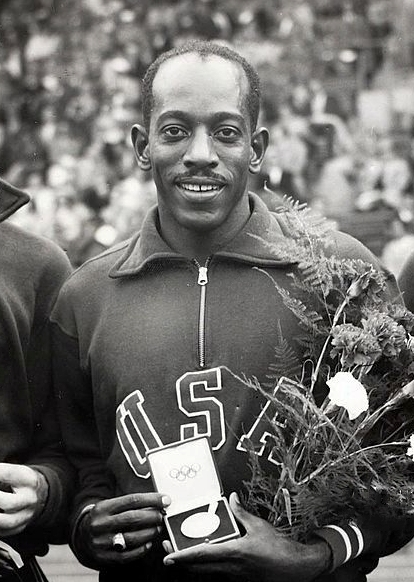
Harrison Dillard

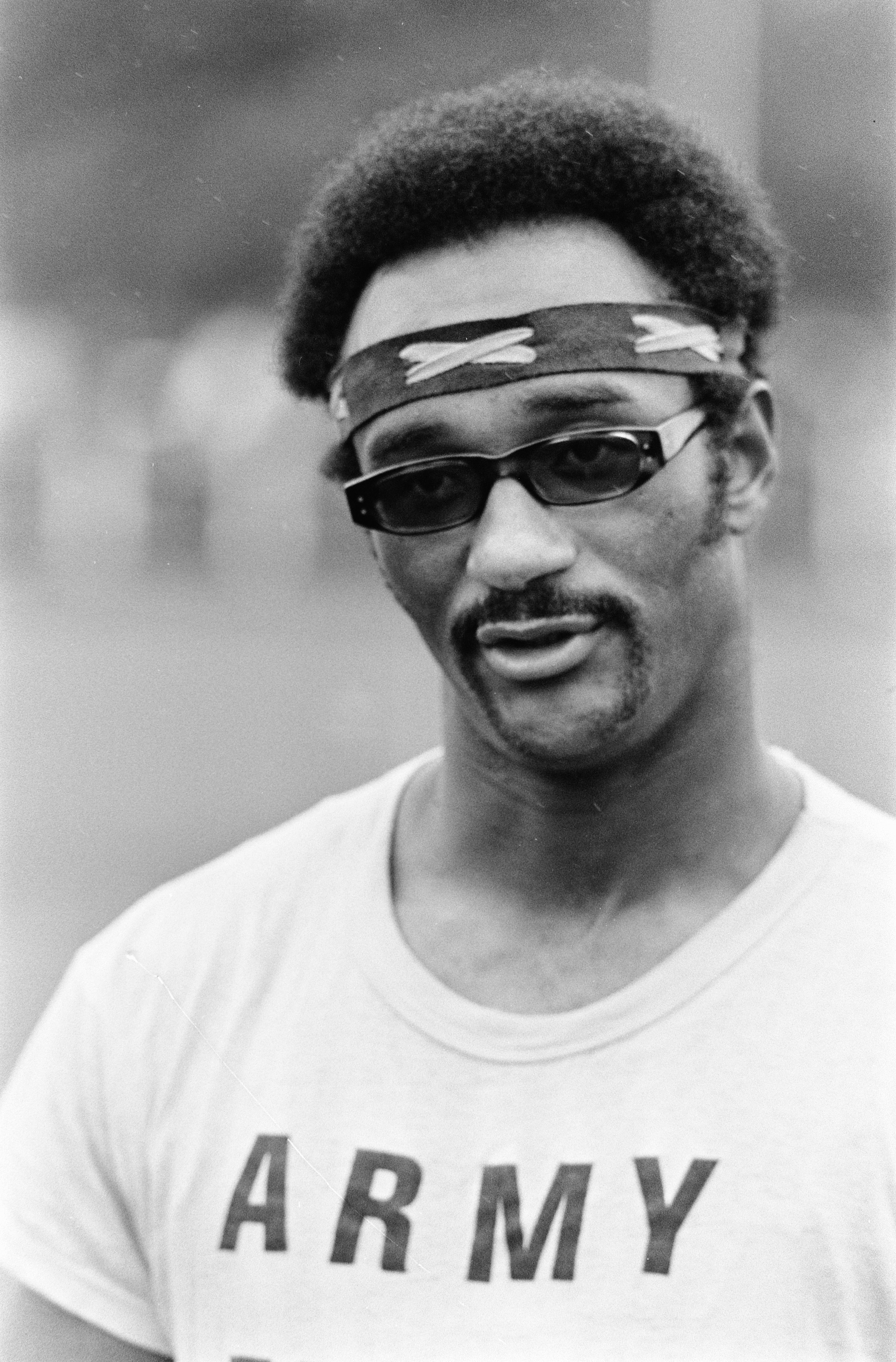
Charles Greene

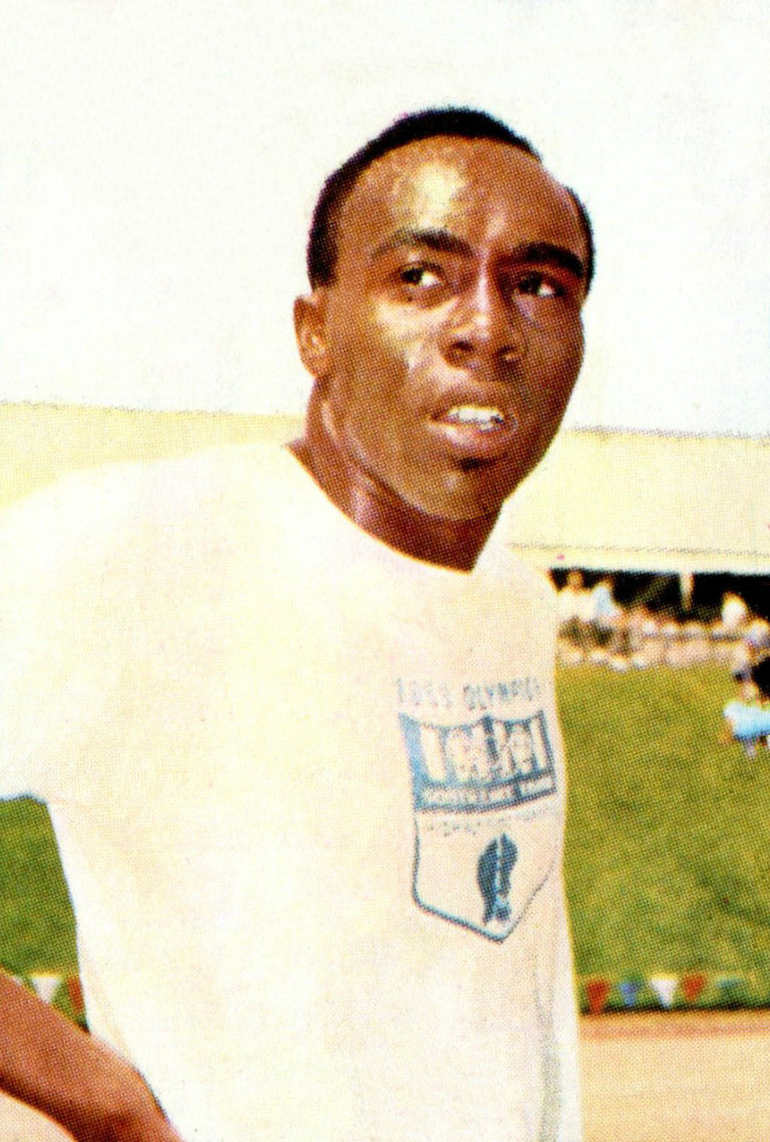
Jim Hines

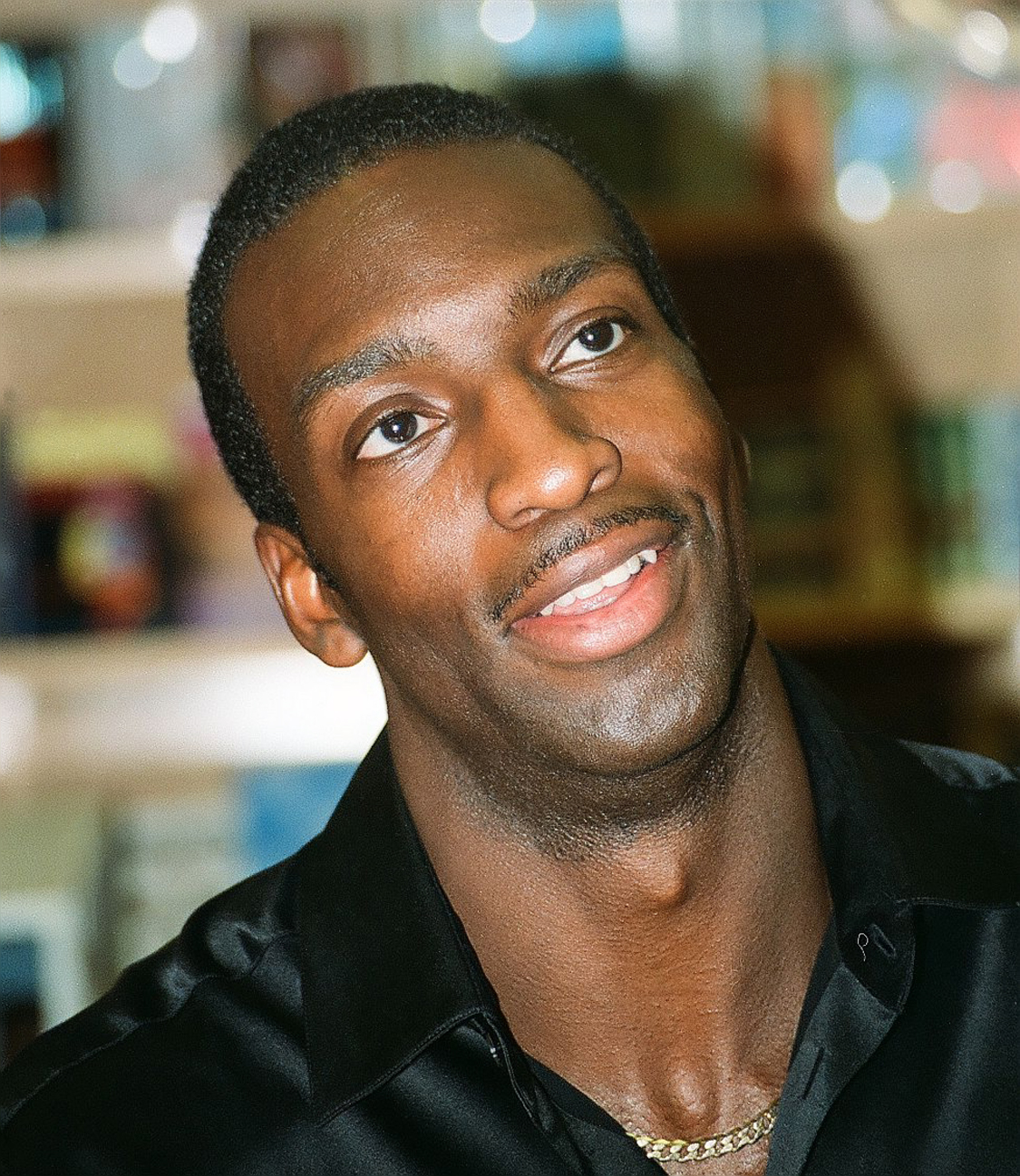
Michael Johnson

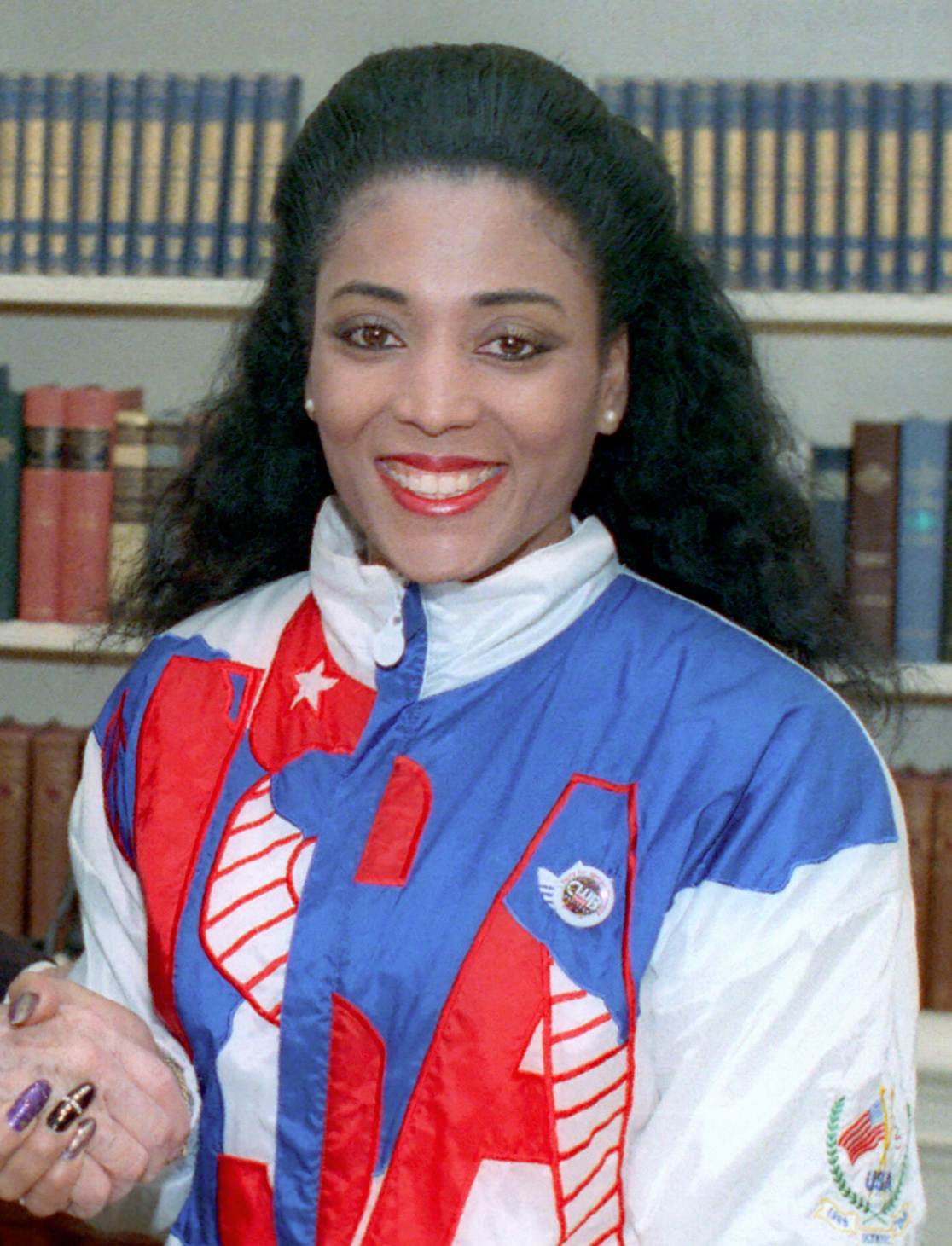
Florence Griffith Joyner

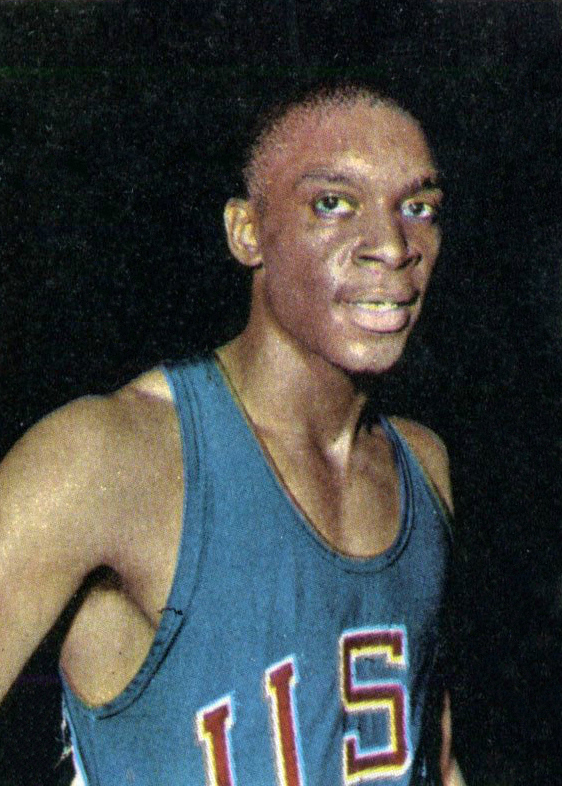
Vincent Matthews

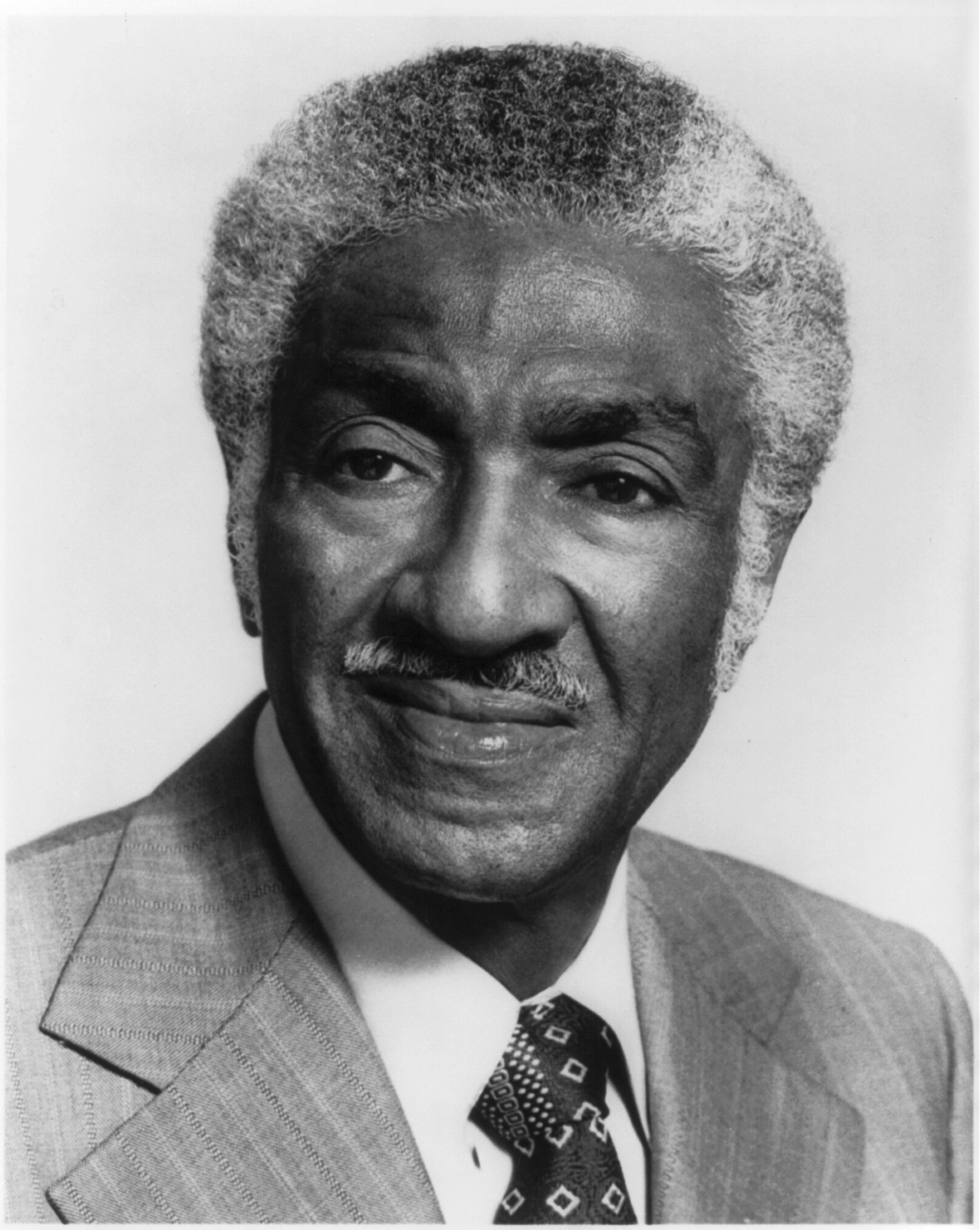
Ralph Metcalfe

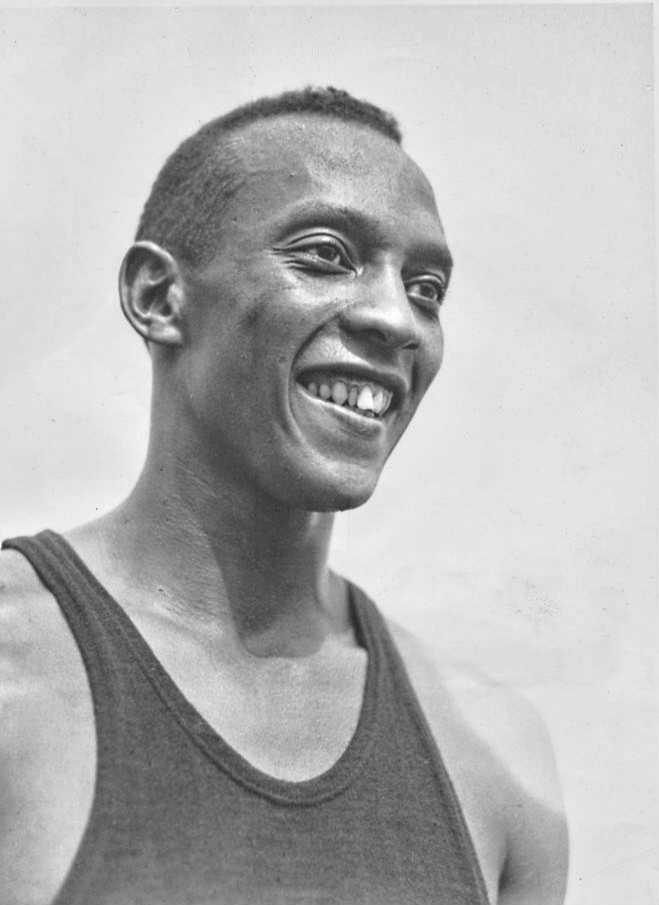
Jesse Owens

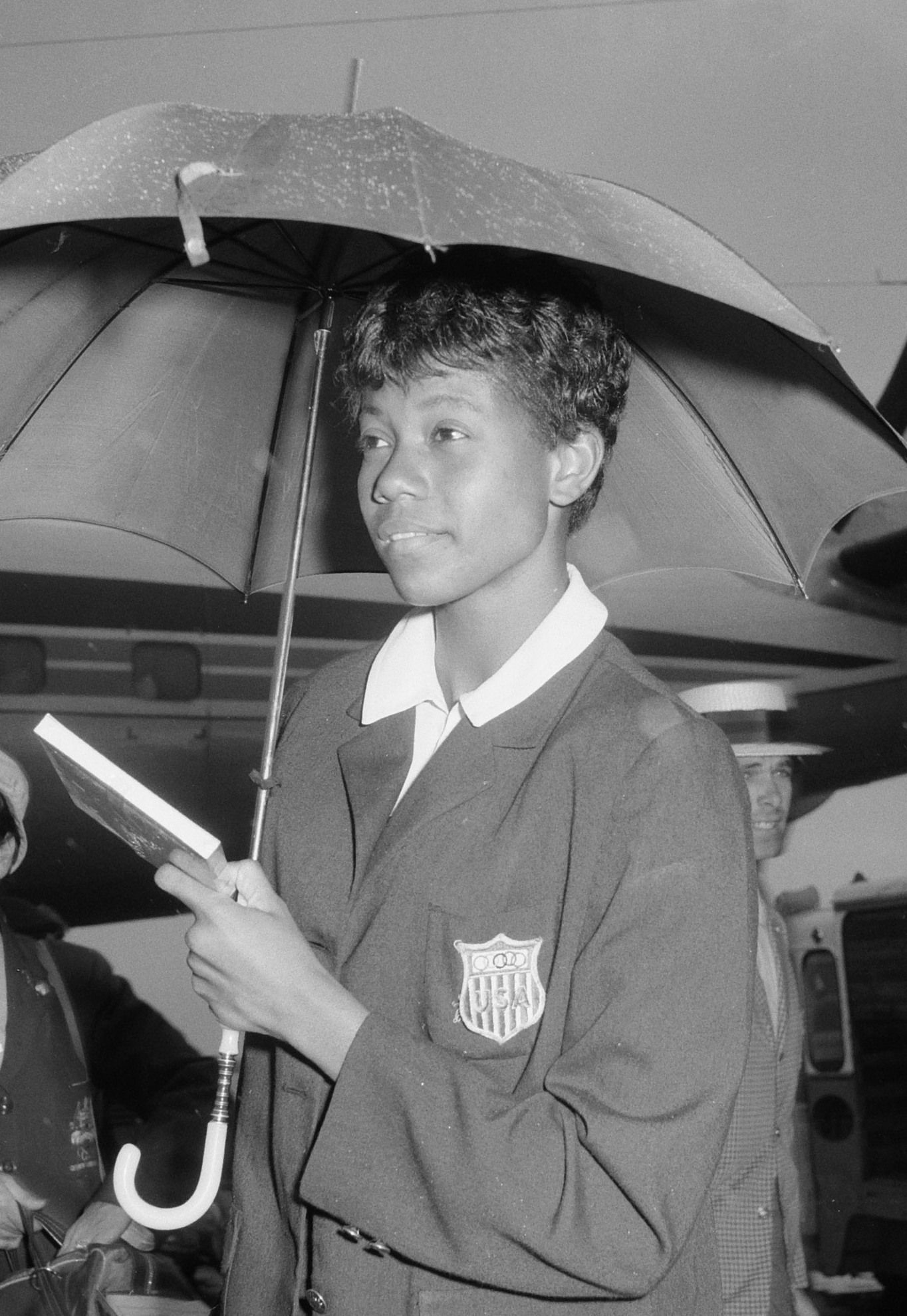
Wilma Rudolph

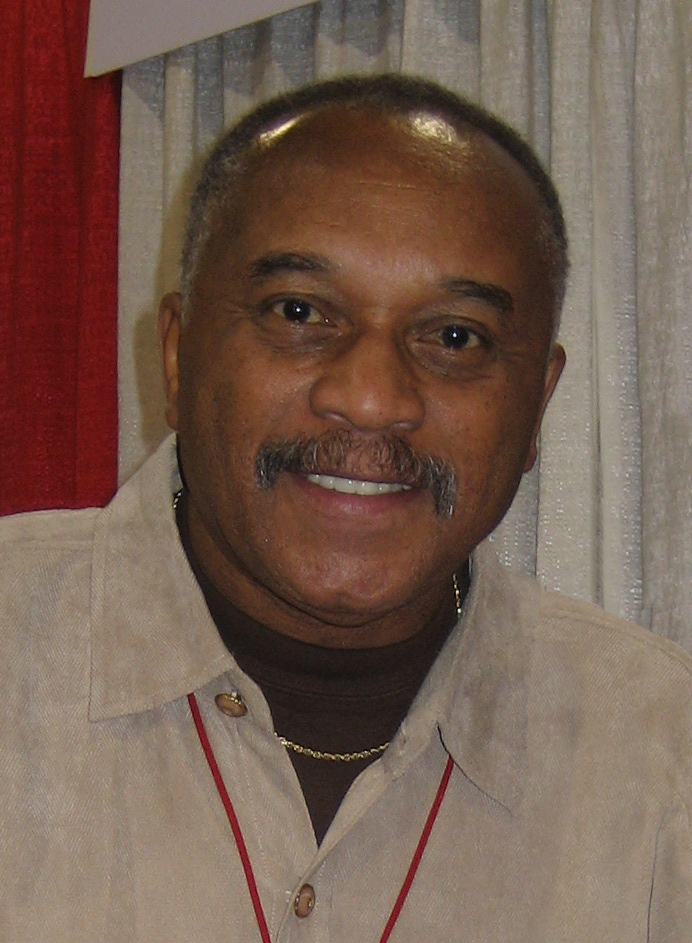
Tommie Smith

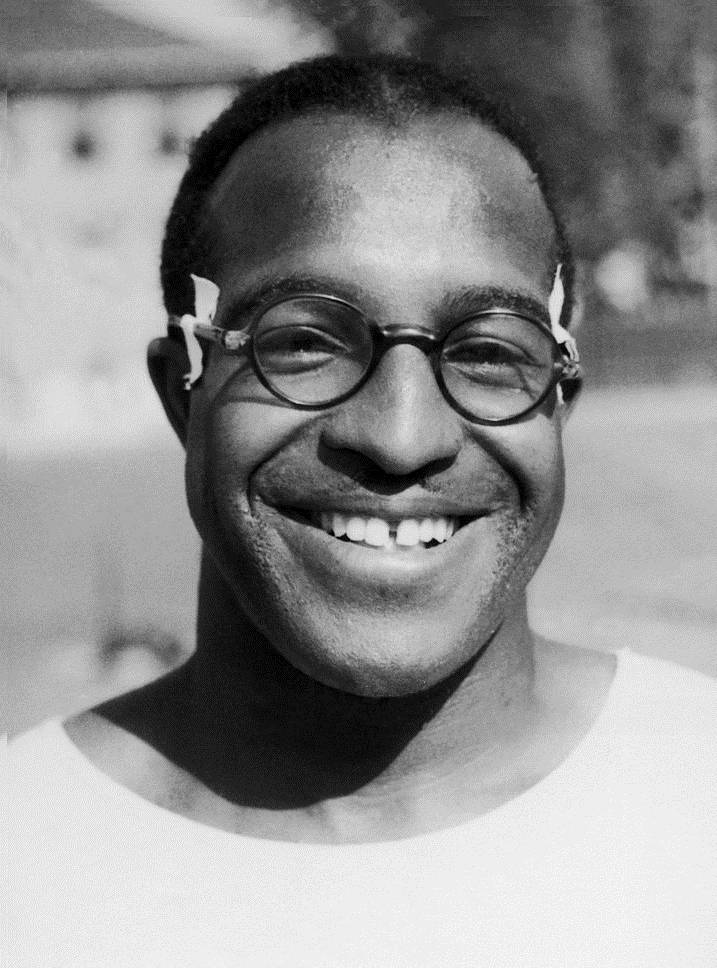
Eddie Tolan

=== A ===
- Charles Austin, retired track and field athlete

=== B ===
- Ronnie Baker, professional track and field athlete
- Bob Beamon, retired track and field athlete
- Larry Black, former track and field athlete
- Trayvon Bromell, professional track and field athlete
- Ralph Boston, former track and field athlete
- Leroy Burrell, retired track and field athlete

=== C ===
- Milt Campbell, former track and field athlete
- Henry Carr, former track and field athlete
- Andre Cason, retired track and field athlete
- Jearl Miles Clark, retired track and field athlete
- Kerron Clement, professional track and field athlete
- Alice Coachman, former track and field athlete
- Wayne Collett, former track and field athlete
- Christian Coleman, professional track and field athlete
- Mike Conley Sr., retired track and field athlete
- Shawn Crawford, retired track and field athlete
- Josh Culbreath, retired track and field athlete

=== D ===
- Tony Darden, retired track and field athlete
- Otis Davis, retired track and field athlete
- Walter Davis, professional track and field athlete
- Harrison Dillard, retired track and field athlete
- Jon Drummond, retired track and field athlete

=== E ===
- Ashton Eaton, retired track and field athlete

=== F ===
- Allyson Felix, professional track and field athlete
- Phyllis Francis, professional track and field athlete
- Ron Freeman, former track and field athlete

=== G ===
- Justin Gatlin, professional track and field athlete
- Tyson Gay, professional track and field athlete
- Charles Green, professional track and field athlete
- Maurice Greene, retired track and field athlete

=== H ===
- Elijah Hall, professional track and field athlete
- Danny Harris, retired track and field athlete
- Otis Harris, professional track and field athlete
- Alvin Harrison, retired track and field athlete
- Jeff Henderson, professional track and field athlete
- Jim Hines, retired track and field athlete

=== J ===
- Larry James, former track and field athlete
- Bershawn Jackson, professional track and field athlete
- Cornelius Johnson, former track and field athlete
- Michael Johnson, retired track and field athlete
- Rafer Johnson, retired track and field athlete
- Al Joyner, retired track and field athlete
- Jackie Joyner-Kersee, retired track and field athlete
- Florence Griffith Joyner, former track and field athlete

=== K ===
- Roger Kingdom, retired track and field athlete
- Erik Kynard, professional track and field athlete

=== L ===
- Brian Lewis, professional track and field athlete
- Carl Lewis, retired track and field athlete
- Noah Lyles, professional track and field athlete

=== M ===
- Michael Marsh, retired track and field athlete
- Vincent Matthews, retired track and field athlete
- Tony McQuay, professional track and field athlete
- Aries Merritt, professional track and field athlete
- LaShawn Merritt, professional track and field athlete
- Ralph Metcalfe, former track and field athlete
- Rod Milburn, former track and field athlete
- Tim Montgomery, retired track and field athlete
- Edwin Moses, retired track and field athlete

=== N ===
- Dave Neville, retired track and field athlete

=== O ===
- Dan O'Brien, retired track and field athlete
- David Oliver, professional track and field athlete
- Jesse Owens, former track and field athlete

=== P ===
- Darvis Patton, retired track and field athlete
- David Payne, professional track and field athlete
- Mike Powell, retired track and field athlete
- Tiffany Porter

=== R ===
- Mack Robinson, retired track and field athlete
- Mike Rodgers, professional track and field athlete
- Wilma Rudolph, former track and field athlete
- Butch Reynolds, retired track and field athlete

=== S ===
- Ronnie Ray Smith, former track and field athlete
- Tommie Smith, retired track and field athlete
- Wallace Spearmon, professional track and field athlete

=== T ===
- Christian Taylor
- Eddie Tolan, former track and field athlete
- Gwen Torrence, retired track and field athlete
- Wyomia Tyus, retired track and field athlete

=== W ===
- Willye White, former track and field athlete
- Archie Williams, former track and field athlete
- John Woodruff, former track and field athlete

=== Y ===
- Kevin Young, retired track and field athlete

== Wrestling ==
- Cedric Alexander, professional wrestler
- Sasha Banks, professional wrestler
- Bianca Belair, professional wrestler
- Shelton Benjamin, professional wrestler
- Angelo Dawkins, professional wrestler
- Montez Ford, professional wrestler
- Mark Henry, former professional wrestler
- Maven, former professional wrestler
- Dwayne 'The Rock' Johnson, retired professional wrestler
- Bobby Lashley, professional wrestler
- Keith Lee, professional wrestler
- Moose, professional wrestler
- Willie Mack, professional wrestler
- Montel Vontavious Porter, professional wrestler
- R-Truth, professional wrestler
- Rich Swann, professional wrestler
- King Booker, retired professional wrestler
- Naomi, professional wrestler
- Titus O'Neil, professional wrestler
- Xavier Woods, professional wrestler
- Mia Yim (African American father), professional wrestler

== Motorsport ==
- Bubba Wallace, NASCAR driver
- Elias Bowie
- George Wiltshire
- Willy T. Ribbs
- Bill Lester

== Martial arts ==
- Daniel Cormier, mixed martial artist
- Quinton Jackson, mixed martial artist
- Demetrious Johnson, mixed martial artist
- Jon Jones, mixed martial artist
- Kevin Lee, mixed martial artist
- Tyron Woodley, mixed martial artist

== Soccer ==
- Andrew Farrell
- Antonee Robinson
- Robbie Findley
- Roy Lassiter
- Benji Michel
- Brandon Servania
- Bright Dike
- Charlie Davies
- Chris Richards
- DeAndre Yedlin
- DeJuan Jones
- DaMarcus Beasley
- Dante Sealy
- Duane Holmes
- Daryl Dike
- Drake Callender
- Eddie Gustafsson
- Eddie Johnson
- Edson Buddle
- Erik Palmer-Brown
- Gianluca Busio
- Haji Wright
- Mark Segbers
- Tim Howard
- Tyler Adams
- Freddy Adu
- Kellyn Acosta
- Eddie Pope
- Briana Scurry
- Kofi Sarkodie
- Kayden Pierre
- Kurowskybob Pierre
- Jonathan Lewis
- Jozy Altidore
- Konrad de la Fuente
- Maurice Edu
- Mark Mckenzie
- Marlon Hairston
- Gyasi Zardes
- Julian Green
- Justin Che
- Marvell Wynne
- Sean Okoli
- Sean Johnson
- Tayvon Gray
- Weston McKennie
- Zack Steffen
- Patrick Koffi
- Jimmy Banks

== See also ==
- Lists of African Americans
- African Americans in sports
