= 2012–13 Toronto Raptors season =

NBA professional basketball team season

- Head coach: Dwane Casey
- Owners: Maple Leaf Sports & Entertainment
- Arena: Air Canada Centre

Results
- Record: 34–48 (.415)
- Place: Division: 5th (Atlantic); Conference: 10th (Eastern)
- Playoff finish: Did not qualify
- Stats at Basketball Reference

The 2012–13 Toronto Raptors season was the 18th season of the franchise in the National Basketball Association (NBA). In the off-season, after failing to obtain Steve Nash in free agency, the Raptors acquired Kyle Lowry from the Houston Rockets for a first-round pick. The season also marked the debut of Jonas Valančiūnas, their first pick in the 2011 draft from Lithuania. On January 30, 2013, the Raptors acquired Rudy Gay in a three-way deal with the Memphis Grizzlies and Detroit Pistons which sent longtime point guard José Calderón to the Pistons. Despite a winning home record (21–20) the Raptors failed to secure a playoff spot with a 34–48 record. This season also marked the official beginning of the DeRozan/Lowry era in Toronto.

The Raptors would not miss the playoffs again until 2021.

This was also their last losing season in a full 82-game season until the 2023-24 season.

== Key dates ==
- June 28: The 2012 NBA draft took place at Prudential Center in Newark, New Jersey.

== Draft picks ==
Round	Pick	Player	Position	Nationality	College/Club Team
1	8	Terrence Ross	SG	United States	Washington
2	37	Quincy Acy	PF	United States	Baylor
2	56	Tomislav Zubčić (from Indiana Pacers)	F	Croatia	Cibona Zagreb

== Pre-season ==
2012 pre-season game log
Pre-season: 6–1 (home: 5–0; road: 1–1)

Game	Date	Team	Score	High points	High rebounds	High assists	Location Attendance	Record
1	October 8	Real Madrid	W 102–95	DeMar DeRozan (18)	Ed Davis (10)	José Calderón (8)	Air Canada Centre; 10,359	1–0
2	October 10	@ Detroit	L 99–101	DeMar DeRozan (17)	Aaron Gray (7)	Four players (2)	The Palace of Auburn Hills; 9,532	1–1
3	October 12	Detroit	W 82–75	DeMar DeRozan (14)	Jonas Valančiūnas (8)	John Lucas III (8)	Air Canada Centre; 10,167	2–1
4	October 17	Washington	W 104–101	Landry Fields (15)	Ed Davis (9)	José Calderón (8)	Air Canada Centre; 11,750	3–1
5	October 19	New York	W 107–88	Andrea Bargnani (20)	Jonas Valančiūnas (10)	Landry Fields, Kyle Lowry (5)	Bell Centre; 22,114	4–1
6	October 22	Milwaukee	W 104–95	DeMar DeRozan (21)	Jonas Valančiūnas (8)	José Calderón, Kyle Lowry (6)	Air Canada Centre; 11,364	5–1
7	October 26	@ Memphis	W 120–106	Andrea Bargnani (21)	Jonas Valančiūnas (7)	José Calderón, Kyle Lowry (7)	FedExForum; 10,206	6–1

2012–13 season schedule

== Roster ==
2012–13 Toronto Raptors roster
Players

Pos.	No.	Player	Height	Weight	DOB	From
F	4	Quincy Acy	6 ft 7 in (2.01 m)	240 lb (109 kg)	1990–10–06	Baylor
F	6	Alan Anderson	6 ft 6 in (1.98 m)	220 lb (100 kg)	1982–10–16	Michigan State
F	7	Andrea Bargnani	7 ft 0 in (2.13 m)	245 lb (111 kg)	1985–10–26	Italy
G/F	10	DeMar DeRozan	6 ft 7 in (2.01 m)	216 lb (98 kg)	1989–08–07	USC
G/F	2	Landry Fields	6 ft 7 in (2.01 m)	215 lb (98 kg)	1988–06–27	Stanford
F	22	Rudy Gay	6 ft 8 in (2.03 m)	230 lb (104 kg)	1986–08–17	Connecticut
C	34	Aaron Gray	7 ft 1 in (2.16 m)	270 lb (122 kg)	1984–12–07	Pittsburgh
F/C	15	Amir Johnson	6 ft 9 in (2.06 m)	210 lb (95 kg)	1987–05–01	Westchester HS (CA)
F	11	Linas Kleiza	6 ft 8 in (2.03 m)	245 lb (111 kg)	1985–01–06	Missouri
G	3	Kyle Lowry	6 ft 0 in (1.83 m)	205 lb (93 kg)	1986–03–25	Villanova
G	5	John Lucas	5 ft 11 in (1.80 m)	166 lb (75 kg)	1982–11–21	Oklahoma State
F	20	Mickaël Piétrus	6 ft 6 in (1.98 m)	215 lb (98 kg)	1982-02-07	Guadeloupe
G/F	31	Terrence Ross	6 ft 6 in (1.98 m)	195 lb (88 kg)	1991–02–05	Washington
G	13	Sebastian Telfair	6 ft 0 in (1.83 m)	175 lb (79 kg)	1985–06–09	Abraham Lincoln High School (Brooklyn)
C	17	Jonas Valančiūnas	6 ft 11 in (2.11 m)	231 lb (105 kg)	1992–05–06	Lithuania

Coaches
Head coach
- Dwane Casey
Assistant(s)
- Bill Bayno
- Nick Nurse
- Jama Mahlalela
- Alex McKechnie
- Jesse Mermuys
- Tom Sterner

Legend
- (DP) Unsigned draft pick
- (FA) Free agent
- (S) Suspended
- (DL) On assignment to
  D-League affiliate
- Injured

Roster
Updated: 2014–03–09

== Regular season ==
=== Game log ===
2012–13 game log
Total: 34–48 (Home: 21–20; Road: 13–28)
October: 0–1 (home: 0–1; road: 0–0)

Game	Date	Team	Score	High points	High rebounds	High assists	Location Attendance	Record
1	October 31	Indiana	L 88–90	Kyle Lowry (21)	Jonas Valančiūnas (10)	Kyle Lowry (8)	Air Canada Centre; 19,800	0–1

November : 4–12 (home: 3–3; road: 1–9)

Game	Date	Team	Score	High points	High rebounds	High assists	Location Attendance	Record
2	November 3	@ Brooklyn	L 100–107	Kyle Lowry (28)	Kyle Lowry (8)	Kyle Lowry (8)	Barclays Center; 17,732	0–2
3	November 4	Minnesota	W 105–86	DeRozan and Lowry (22)	DeRozan, Lowry and Davis (7)	Kyle Lowry (5)	Air Canada Centre; 16,754	1–2
4	November 6	@ Oklahoma City	L 88–108	Jonas Valančiūnas (18)	Ed Davis (9)	Lowry & Lucas (4)	Chesapeake Energy Arena; 18,203	1–3
5	November 7	@ Dallas	L 104–109	Andrea Bargnani (25)	Amir Johnson (11)	DeMar DeRozan (7)	American Airlines Center; 19,763	1–4
6	November 10	Philadelphia	L 83–93	Andrea Bargnani (23)	Jonas Valančiūnas (8)	José Calderón (11)	Air Canada Centre; 19,800	1–5
7	November 12	Utah	L 133–140 (3OT)	DeMar DeRozan (37)	Amir Johnson (14)	José Calderón (17)	Air Canada Centre; 18,230	1–6
8	November 13	@ Indiana	W 74–72	DeMar DeRozan (15)	José Calderón (10)	José Calderón (10)	Bankers Life Fieldhouse; 11,947	2–6
9	November 17	@ Boston	L 89–107	Bargnani & Lucas (15)	Ed Davis (9)	José Calderón (9)	TD Garden; 18,624	2–7
10	November 18	Orlando	W 97–86	DeMar DeRozan (20)	DeMar DeRozan (9)	José Calderón (18)	Air Canada Centre; 18,702	3–7
11	November 20	@ Philadelphia	L 98–106	DeMar DeRozan (24)	Jonas Valančiūnas (11)	José Calderón (12)	Wells Fargo Center; 13,965	3–8
12	November 21	@ Charlotte	L 97–98	Andrea Bargnani (25)	Jonas Valančiūnas (10)	Kyle Lowry (8)	Time Warner Cable Arena; 15,240	3–9
13	November 23	@ Detroit	L 90–91	Andrea Bargnani (34)	Valančiūnas & Lowry (6)	Kyle Lowry (5)	The Palace of Auburn Hills; 12,778	3–10
14	November 25	San Antonio	L 106–111	DeMar DeRozan (29)	Ed Davis (14)	José Calderón (9)	Air Canada Centre; 19,800	3–11
15	November 27	@ Houston	L 101–117	Andrea Bargnani (21)	Kyle Lowry (8)	José Calderón (7)	Toyota Center; 12,907	3–12
16	November 28	@ Memphis	L 82–103	DeMar DeRozan (16)	Ed Davis (6)	Kyle Lowry (4)	FedExForum; 14,603	3–13
17	November 30	Phoenix	W 101–97	DeMar DeRozan (23)	DeRozan & Davis (8)	José Calderón (9)	Air Canada Centre; 18,246	4–13

December : 7–7 (home: 4–1; road: 3–6)

Game	Date	Team	Score	High points	High rebounds	High assists	Location Attendance	Record
18	December 3	@ Denver	L 110–113	Kyle Lowry (24)	Ed Davis (9)	Kyle Lowry (7)	Pepsi Center; 15,221	4–14
19	December 5	@ Sacramento	L 100–107	Kyle Lowry (34)	Ed Davis (11)	Kyle Lowry (11)	Sleep Train Arena; 12,476	4–15
20	December 7	@ Utah	L 99–131	Andrea Bargnani (20)	Andrea Bargnani (8)	Kyle Lowry (4)	EnergySolutions Arena; 18,069	4–16
21	December 9	@ L. A. Clippers	L 83–102	DeMar DeRozan (24)	Amir Johnson (8)	Kyle Lowry (9)	Staples Center; 19,060	4–17
22	December 10	@ Portland	L 74–92	DeMar DeRozan (20)	Jonas Valančiūnas (10)	José Calderón (6)	Rose Garden; 16,863	4–18
23	December 12	Brooklyn	L 88–94	Ed Davis (24)	Ed Davis (12)	José Calderón (15)	Air Canada Centre; 18,847	4–19
24	December 14	Dallas	W 95–74	Linas Kleiza (20)	Ed Davis (8)	John Lucas III (6)	Air Canada Centre; 19,132	5–19
25	December 16	Houston	W 103–96	Alan Anderson (24)	José Calderón (10)	José Calderón (14)	Air Canada Centre; 17,863	6–19
26	December 18	@ Cleveland	W 113–99	José Calderón (23)	Jonas Valančiūnas (7)	José Calderón (6)	Quicken Loans Arena; 13,233	7–19
27	December 19	Detroit	W 97–91	DeMar DeRozan (23)	Johnson & Davis (9)	José Calderón (17)	Air Canada Centre; 17,062	8–19
28	December 21	Orlando	W 93–90	DeMar DeRozan (17)	DeMar DeRozan (8)	José Calderón (9)	Air Canada Centre; 18,391	9–19
29	December 26	@ San Antonio	L 80–100	Johnson & Anderson (12)	Ed Davis (7)	José Calderón (10)	AT&T Center; 18,581	9-20
30	December 28	@ New Orleans	W 104–97	DeMar DeRozan (30)	Amir Johnson (8)	Kyle Lowry (8)	New Orleans Arena; 13,968	10–20
31	December 29	@ Orlando	W 123–88	DeMar DeRozan (21)	Landry Fields (9)	José Calderón (10)	Amway Center; 18,846	11–20

January : 5–10 (home: 4–6; road: 1–4)

Game	Date	Team	Score	High points	High rebounds	High assists	Location Attendance	Record
32	January 2	Portland	W 102–79	Terrence Ross (26)	Fields, Johnson & Davis (7)	José Calderón (13)	Air Canada Centre; 18,117	12–20
33	January 4	Sacramento	L 96–105	Kyle Lowry (24)	Ed Davis (13)	Kyle Lowry (4)	Air Canada Centre; 17,824	12–21
34	January 6	Oklahoma City	L 92–104	Alan Anderson (27)	Amir Johnson (9)	José Calderón (11)	Air Canada Centre; 17,634	12–22
35	January 9	Philadelphia	W 90–72	DeRozan & Johnson (19)	Amir Johnson (12)	José Calderón (11)	Air Canada Centre; 15,629	13–22
36	January 11	Charlotte	W 99–78	Alan Anderson (16)	Landry Fields (11)	Calderón & Lowry (6)	Air Canada Centre; 14,373	14-22
37	January 13	Milwaukee	L 96–107	DeMar DeRozan (23)	Amir Johnson (14)	José Calderón (8)	Air Canada Centre; 17,384	14-23
38	January 15	@ Brooklyn	L 106–113	Kyle Lowry (21)	Landry Fields (11)	Calderón & Fields	Barclays Center; 16,236	14–24
39	January 16	Chicago	L 105–107 (OT)	Alan Anderson (27)	Amir Johnson (10)	Kyle Lowry (7)	Air Canada Centre; 18,674	14–25
40	January 18	@ Philadelphia	L 101–108 (OT)	Anderson, Davis, Ross (18)	Ed Davis (10)	Kyle Lowry (11)	Wells Fargo Center; 16,574	14–26
41	January 20	L. A. Lakers	W 108–103	José Calderón (22)	Landry Fields (10)	José Calderón (9)	Air Canada Centre; 19,800	15–26
42	January 23	@ Miami	L 116–123 (OT)	Alan Anderson (20)	Amir Johnson (6)	DeMar DeRozan (7)	American Airlines Arena; 20,002	15–27
43	January 24	@ Orlando	W 97–95	DeMar DeRozan (22)	Amir Johnson (10)	DeMar DeRozan (7)	Amway Center; 17,145	16–27
44	January 26	Cleveland	L 98–99	Amir Johnson (18)	Amir Johnson (12)	Kyle Lowry (7)	Air Canada Centre; 18,820	16–28
45	January 28	Golden State	L 102–114	Aaron Gray (22)	Aaron Gray (10)	DeMar DeRozan (9)	Air Canada Centre; 15,914	16-29
46	January 30	@ Atlanta	L 92–93	DeMar DeRozan (23)	Amir Johnson (14)	Kyle Lowry (5)	Philips Arena; 12,021	16–30

February : 7–5 (home: 4–4; road: 3–1)

Game	Date	Team	Score	High points	High rebounds	High assists	Location Attendance	Record
47	February 1	L. A. Clippers	W 98–73	Rudy Gay (20)	Amir Johnson (16)	Kyle Lowry (8)	Air Canada Centre; 19,800	17–30
48	February 3	Miami	L 85–100	Rudy Gay (29)	Aaron Gray (12)	Anderson, DeRozan & Lowry (3)	Air Canada Centre; 19,800	17-31
49	February 6	Boston	L 95–99	Rudy Gay (25)	Gay & Johnson (12)	Kyle Lowry (8)	Air Canada Centre; 17,163	17–32
50	February 8	@ Indiana	W 100–98 (OT)	Rudy Gay (23)	Amir Johnson (14)	Kyle Lowry (6)	Bankers Life Fieldhouse; 16,253	18–32
51	February 10	New Orleans	W 102–89	Rudy Gay (20)	Jonas Valančiūnas (10)	Kyle Lowry (10)	Air Canada Centre; 17,177	19–32
52	February 12	Denver	W 109–108	DeMar DeRozan (22)	DeRozan & Valančiūnas (8)	Kyle Lowry (10)	Air Canada Centre; 16,738	20–32
53	February 13	@ New York	W 92–88	Alan Anderson (26)	Landry Fields (10)	Rudy Gay (4)	Madison Square Garden; 19,033	21–32
All-Star Break
54	February 19	@ Washington	W 96–88	DeRozan & Gay (24)	Gay & Valančiūnas (8)	Kyle Lowry (10)	Verizon Center; 13,923	22–32
55	February 20	Memphis	L 82–88	Alan Anderson (19)	Rudy Gay (9)	DeMar DeRozan (5)	Air Canada Centre; 19,800	22–33
56	February 22	New York	W 100–98	Rudy Gay (32)	Jonas Valančiūnas (10)	Kyle Lowry (7)	Air Canada Centre; 19,800	23-33
57	February 25	Washington	L 84–90	DeMar DeRozan (25)	Amir Johnson (13)	Rudy Gay (4)	Air Canada Centre; 16,705	23-34
58	February 27	@ Cleveland	L 92–103	DeMar DeRozan (34)	Amir Johnson (9)	Kyle Lowry (8)	Quicken Loans Arena; 13,368	23–35

March : 4–11 (home: 2–4; road: 2–7)

Game	Date	Team	Score	High points	High rebounds	High assists	Location Attendance	Record
59	March 1	Indiana	L 81–93	Rudy Gay (21)	Jonas Valančiūnas (9)	DeMar DeRozan (3)	Air Canada Centre; 18,268	23–36
60	March 2	@ Milwaukee	L 114–122 (OT)	Alan Anderson (21)	Kyle Lowry (10)	Kyle Lowry (10)	Bradley Center; 16,165	23–37
61	March 4	@ Golden State	L 118–125	Bargnani & Gay (26)	Amir Johnson (15)	Kyle Lowry (9)	Oracle Arena; 19,596	23-38
62	March 6	@ Phoenix	W 98–71	DeMar DeRozan (15)	DeRozan & Johnson (6)	Sebastian Telfair (7)	US Airways Center; 13,173	24–38
63	March 8	@ L. A. Lakers	L 116–118 (OT)	DeMar DeRozan (28)	Rudy Gay (7)	Kyle Lowry (10)	Staples Center; 18,997	24–39
64	March 10	Cleveland	W 100–96	Alan Anderson (18)	Amir Johnson (16)	DeMar DeRozan (6)	Air Canada Centre; 19,800	25–39
65	March 13	@ Boston	L 88–112	Rudy Gay (19)	Rudy Gay (7)	Rudy Gay (4)	TD Garden; 18,624	25–40
66	March 15	Charlotte	W 92–78	Rudy Gay (28)	Amir Johnson (21)	Sebastian Telfair (5)	Air Canada Centre; 17,514	26–40
67	March 17	Miami	L 91–108	Rudy Gay (27)	Amir Johnson (18)	Rudy Gay (4)	Air Canada Centre; 18,564	26–41
68	March 20	@ Charlotte	L 101–107	Rudy Gay (25)	Amir Johnson (10)	Kyle Lowry (5)	Time Warner Cable Arena; 12,872	26–42
69	March 22	New York	L 94–99	Alan Anderson (35)	Jonas Valančiūnas (7)	Kyle Lowry (10)	Air Canada Centre; 19,800	26–43
70	March 23	@ New York	L 84–110	DeMar DeRozan (17)	Jonas Valančiūnas (8)	Kyle Lowry (4)	Madison Square Garden; 19,033	26–44
71	March 27	Atlanta	L 88–107	Jonas Valančiūnas (19)	Rudy Gay (12)	Kyle Lowry (10)	Air Canada Centre; 18,206	26–45
72	March 29	@ Detroit	W 99–82	DeRozan & Gay (21)	Jonas Valančiūnas (13)	Kyle Lowry (11)	The Palace of Auburn Hills; 19,322	27-45
73	March 31	@ Washington	L 92–109	Jonas Valančiūnas (18)	Amir Johnson (12)	Kyle Lowry (7)	Verizon Center; 14,360	27–46

April: 7–2 (home: 4–1; road: 3–1)

Game	Date	Team	Score	High points	High rebounds	High assists	Location Attendance	Record
74	April 1	Detroit	L 98–108	Rudy Gay (34)	DeMar DeRozan (7)	Kyle Lowry (7)	Air Canada Centre; 17,115	27–47
75	April 3	Washington	W 88–78	DeMar DeRozan (25)	Jonas Valančiūnas (10)	Kyle Lowry (13)	Air Canada Centre; 15,783	28–47
76	April 5	@ Minnesota	W 95–93	Rudy Gay (26)	Amir Johnson (8)	Kyle Lowry (7)	Target Center; 16,661	29–47
77	April 6	@ Milwaukee	L 83–100	Alan Anderson (14)	Rudy Gay (8)	Sebastian Telfair (7)	Bradley Center; 16,746	29–48
78	April 9	@ Chicago	W 101–98	DeMar DeRozan (20)	Amir Johnson (11)	Kyle Lowry (10)	United Center; 21,487	30–48
79	April 12	Chicago	W 97–88	Amir Johnson (24)	Acy, Johnson & Lowry (9)	Kyle Lowry (11)	Air Canada Centre; 19,800	31–48
80	April 14	Brooklyn	W 93–87	DeMar DeRozan (36)	Rudy Gay (10)	Kyle Lowry (6)	Air Canada Centre; 17,617	32–48
81	April 16	@ Atlanta	W 113–96	DeMar DeRozan (30)	Amir Johnson (8)	Kyle Lowry (11)	Philips Arena; 15,200	33–48
82	April 17	Boston	W 114–90	DeMar DeRozan (24)	Landry Fields (11)	Kyle Lowry (8)	Air Canada Centre; 17,690	34–48

2012–13 season schedule

=== Standings ===
Atlantic Division	W	L	PCT	GB	Home	Road	Div	GP
y-New York Knicks	54	28	.659	–	31–10	23–18	10–6	82
x-Brooklyn Nets	49	33	.598	5	26–15	23–18	11–5	82
x-Boston Celtics	41	40	.506	12.5	27–13	14–27	7–9	81†
Philadelphia 76ers	34	48	.415	20	23–18	11–30	7–9	82
Toronto Raptors	34	48	.415	20	21–20	13–28	5–11	82

Eastern Conference
#	Team	W	L	PCT	GB	GP
1	z-Miami Heat *	66	16	.805	–	82
2	y-New York Knicks *	54	28	.659	12.0	82
3	y-Indiana Pacers *	49	32	.605	16.5	81
4	x-Brooklyn Nets	49	33	.598	17.0	82
5	x-Chicago Bulls	45	37	.549	21.0	82
6	x-Atlanta Hawks	44	38	.537	22.0	82
7	x-Boston Celtics	41	40	.506	24.5	81
8	x-Milwaukee Bucks	38	44	.463	28.0	82
9	Philadelphia 76ers	34	48	.415	32.0	82
10	Toronto Raptors	34	48	.415	32.0	82
11	Washington Wizards	29	53	.354	37.0	82
12	Detroit Pistons	29	53	.354	37.0	82
13	Cleveland Cavaliers	24	58	.293	42.0	82
14	Charlotte Bobcats	21	61	.256	45.0	82
15	Orlando Magic	20	62	.244	46.0	82

== Player statistics ==
=== Ragular season ===
Player	POS	GP	GS	MP	REB	AST	STL	BLK	PTS	MPG	RPG	APG	SPG	BPG	PPG
DeMar DeRozan	SG	82	82	3,013	320	204	76	24	1,485	36.7	3.9	2.5	.9	.3	18.1
Amir Johnson	PF	81	38	2,325	611	122	81	110	813	28.7	7.5	1.5	1.0	1.4	10.0
Terrence Ross	SG	73	2	1,239	144	53	43	14	467	17.0	2.0	.7	.6	.2	6.4
Kyle Lowry	PG	68	52	2,020	321	435	94	24	791	29.7	4.7	6.4	1.4	.4	11.6
Alan Anderson	SF	65	2	1,495	148	103	48	7	693	23.0	2.3	1.6	.7	.1	10.7
John Lucas III	PG	63	0	827	65	105	23	1	333	13.1	1.0	1.7	.4	.0	5.3
Jonas Valančiūnas	C	62	57	1,482	372	45	17	78	554	23.9	6.0	.7	.3	1.3	8.9
Landry Fields	SF	51	22	1,037	208	60	32	8	240	20.3	4.1	1.2	.6	.2	4.7
José Calderón^{†}	PG	45	30	1,273	106	333	28	6	500	28.3	2.4	7.4	.6	.1	11.1
Ed Davis^{†}	C	45	24	1,087	300	55	25	38	438	24.2	6.7	1.2	.6	.8	9.7
Aaron Gray	C	42	16	513	133	33	7	5	119	12.2	3.2	.8	.2	.1	2.8
Andrea Bargnani	PF	35	25	1,003	128	38	21	23	443	28.7	3.7	1.1	.6	.7	12.7
Rudy Gay^{†}	SF	33	32	1,146	212	94	57	22	643	34.7	6.4	2.8	1.7	.7	19.5
Quincy Acy	PF	29	0	342	77	11	13	15	116	11.8	2.7	.4	.4	.5	4.0
Linas Kleiza	SF	20	3	376	52	16	4	2	148	18.8	2.6	.8	.2	.1	7.4
Mickaël Piétrus	SF	19	16	386	36	9	12	6	100	20.3	1.9	.5	.6	.3	5.3
Dominic McGuire^{†}	SF	15	9	230	48	10	5	8	32	15.3	3.2	.7	.3	.5	2.1
Sebastian Telfair^{†}	PG	13	0	185	16	39	9	1	56	14.2	1.2	3.0	.7	.1	4.3

- ^{†} Denotes player spent time with another team in the season. Stats reflect time with the Raptors only.
