= 2011–12 Toronto Raptors season =

NBA professional basketball team season

- Head coach: Dwane Casey
- Owners: Maple Leaf Sports & Entertainment
- Arena: Air Canada Centre

Results
- Record: 23–43 (.348)
- Place: Division: 4th (Atlantic); Conference: 11th (Eastern)
- Playoff finish: Did not qualify
- Stats at Basketball Reference

Local media
- Television: NBA TV Canada, Rogers Sportsnet, Rogers Sportsnet One, TSN, TSN2
- Radio: CJCL

The 2011–12 Toronto Raptors season was the 17th season of the franchise in the National Basketball Association (NBA). The season start was delayed, and the season schedule was compressed due to the 2011 NBA lockout. The Raptors finished the season with a 23–43 record and did not make it to the playoffs.

One of the biggest lowlights of the season was dropping the season series against the eventual all-time NBA worst 7-59 Charlotte Bobcats.

== Key dates ==
- June 23: The 2011 NBA draft took place at Prudential Center in Newark, New Jersey.
- December 26: Toronto started the regular season with a win against the Cleveland Cavaliers.

== Draft picks ==
Round	Pick	Player	Position	Nationality	College/Club Team
1	5	Jonas Valančiūnas	C	Lithuania	Lietuvos rytas

== Roster ==
2011–12 Toronto Raptors roster
Players

Pos.	No.	Player	Height	Weight	DOB	From
C	50	Solomon Alabi	7 ft 1 in (2.16 m)	251 lb (114 kg)	1988–03–21	Florida State
G	6	Alan Anderson	6 ft 6 in (1.98 m)	220 lb (100 kg)	1982–10–16	Michigan State
F/C	7	Andrea Bargnani	7 ft 0 in (2.13 m)	250 lb (113 kg)	1985–10–26	Italy
G	5	Jerryd Bayless	6 ft 3 in (1.91 m)	200 lb (91 kg)	1988–08–20	Arizona
G	8	José Calderón	6 ft 3 in (1.91 m)	210 lb (95 kg)	1981–09–28	Spain
F	32	Ed Davis	6 ft 10 in (2.08 m)	215 lb (98 kg)	1989–06–05	North Carolina
G	1	Justin Dentmon	5 ft 11 in (1.80 m)	185 lb (84 kg)	1985–09–05	Washington
G/F	10	DeMar DeRozan	6 ft 7 in (2.01 m)	220 lb (100 kg)	1989–08–07	USC
F	3	Gary Forbes	6 ft 7 in (2.01 m)	220 lb (100 kg)	1985–02–25	UMass
C	34	Aaron Gray	7 ft 0 in (2.13 m)	270 lb (122 kg)	1984–12–07	Pittsburgh
F	15	Amir Johnson	6 ft 9 in (2.06 m)	210 lb (95 kg)	1987–05–01	Westchester HS (CA)
F	2	James Johnson	6 ft 9 in (2.06 m)	245 lb (111 kg)	1987–02–20	Wake Forest
F	11	Linas Kleiza	6 ft 8 in (2.03 m)	245 lb (111 kg)	1985–01–03	Missouri
C	21	Jamaal Magloire	6 ft 11 in (2.11 m)	255 lb (116 kg)	1978–05–21	Kentucky
G	18	Ben Uzoh	6 ft 3 in (1.91 m)	205 lb (93 kg)	1988–03–18	Tulsa

Coaches
Head coach
- Dwane Casey
Assistant(s)
- Micah Nori
- Eric Hughes
- Scott Roth
- Johnny Davis
- Tom Sterner

Legend
- (DP) Unsigned draft pick
- (FA) Free agent
- (S) Suspended
- Injured

== Pre-season ==
=== Game log ===
2011 pre-season game log
Pre-season: 0–2 (home: 0–1; road: 0–1)

Game	Date	Team	Score	High points	High rebounds	High assists	Location Attendance	Record
1	December 18	Boston Celtics	L 75–76	Andrea Bargnani (16)	Ed Davis (10)	José Calderón (6)	Air Canada Centre; 16,721	0–1
2	December 21	@ Boston Celtics	L 73–81	Andrea Bargnani (20)	DeMar DeRozan (10)	Jerryd Bayless; James Johnson (3)	TD Garden; 18,624	0–2

2011–12 season schedule

== Regular season ==
=== Standings ===
Atlantic Division	W	L	PCT	GB	Home	Road	Div	GP
y-Boston Celtics	39	27	.591	–	24–9	15–18	8–6	66
x-New York Knicks	36	30	.545	3	22–11	14–19	8–6	66
x-Philadelphia 76ers	35	31	.530	4	19–14	16–17	7–6	66
Toronto Raptors	23	43	.348	16	13–20	10–23	7–8	66
New Jersey Nets	22	44	.333	17	9–24	13–20	5–9	66

Eastern Conference
#	Team	W	L	PCT	GB	GP
1	z-Chicago Bulls	50	16	.758	–	66
2	y-Miami Heat *	46	20	.697	4.0	66
3	x-Indiana Pacers *	42	24	.636	8.0	66
4	y-Boston Celtics	39	27	.591	11.0	66
5	x-Atlanta Hawks	40	26	.606	10.0	66
6	x-Orlando Magic	37	29	.561	13.0	66
7	x-New York Knicks	36	30	.545	14.0	66
8	x-Philadelphia 76ers	35	31	.530	15.0	66
9	Milwaukee Bucks	31	35	.470	19.0	66
10	Detroit Pistons	25	41	.379	25.0	66
11	Toronto Raptors	23	43	.348	27.0	66
12	New Jersey Nets	22	44	.333	28.0	66
13	Cleveland Cavaliers	21	45	.318	29.0	66
14	Washington Wizards	20	46	.303	30.0	66
15	Charlotte Bobcats	7	59	.106	43.0	66

=== Game log ===
2011–12 game log
Total: 23–43 (Home: 13–20; Road: 10–23)
December: 1–2 (home: 0–1; road: 1–1)

Game	Date	Team	Score	High points	High rebounds	High assists	Location Attendance	Record
1	December 26	@ Cleveland	W 104–96	José Calderón; DeMar DeRozan (15)	Amir Johnson (13)	José Calderón (11)	Quicken Loans Arena; 20,562	1–0
2	December 28	Indiana	L 85–90	DeMar DeRozan (22)	Amir Johnson (10)	José Calderón (6)	Air Canada Centre; 19,800	1–1
3	December 30	@ Dallas	L 86–99	Andrea Bargnani (30)	Andrea Bargnani (7)	José Calderón (7)	American Airlines Center; 20,307	1–2

January : 6–13 (home: 2–5; road: 4–8)

Game	Date	Team	Score	High points	High rebounds	High assists	Location Attendance	Record
4	January 1	@ Orlando	L 96–102	Andrea Bargnani (28)	Andrea Bargnani (7)	José Calderón (13)	Amway Center; 18,846	1–3
5	January 2	@ New York	W 90–85	Andrea Bargnani; DeMar DeRozan (21)	Rasual Butler; Jamaal Magloire (10)	José Calderón (12)	Madison Square Garden; 19,763	2–3
6	January 4	Cleveland	W 92–77	Andrea Bargnani (31)	James Johnson (8)	José Calderón (11)	Air Canada Centre; 14,468	3–3
7	January 6	New Jersey	L 85–97	José Calderón (19)	Amir Johnson (10)	José Calderón (8)	Air Canada Centre; 16,771	3–4
8	January 7	@ Philadelphia	L 62–97	Andrea Bargnani (21)	Amir Johnson (14)	José Calderón (7)	Wells Fargo Center; 14,522	3–5
9	January 9	Minnesota	W 97–87	Andrea Bargnani (31)	Amir Johnson (11)	José Calderón (6)	Air Canada Centre; 14,097	4–5
10	January 10	@ Washington	L 78–93	Andrea Bargnani (22)	Amir Johnson (10)	José Calderón (8)	Verizon Center; 14,077	4–6
11	January 11	Sacramento	L 91–98	Leandro Barbosa (24)	Andrea Bargnani (10)	José Calderón (10)	Air Canada Centre; 14,323	4–7
12	January 13	Indiana	L 90–95	DeMar DeRozan (23)	Ed Davis (10)	José Calderón (9)	Air Canada Centre; 15,302	4–8
13	January 14	@ Chicago	L 64–77	DeMar DeRozan (15)	Amir Johnson (13)	José Calderón (8)	United Center; 21,962	4–9
14	January 16	@ Atlanta	L 84–93	Leandro Barbosa (22)	Ed Davis (11)	José Calderón (11)	Philips Arena; 11,050	4–10
15	January 18	@ Boston	L 73–96	Gary Forbes (18)	Ed Davis (9)	José Calderón (4)	TD Garden; 18,624	4–11
16	January 20	Portland	L 84–94	James Johnson (23)	Ed Davis (10)	José Calderón (13)	Air Canada Centre; 17,537	4–12
17	January 22	@ L. A. Clippers	L 91–103	Leandro Barbosa (19)	DeMar DeRozan; Aaron Gray (8)	Jerryd Bayless (5)	Staples Center; 19,060	4–13
18	January 24	@ Phoenix	W 99–96	Andrea Bargnani (36)	James Johnson; Linas Kleiza (10)	José Calderón (11)	US Airways Center; 15,404	5–13
19	January 25	@ Utah	W 111–106 (2OT)	Andrea Bargnani; Linas Kleiza (25)	DeMar DeRozan (8)	José Calderón; Jerryd Bayless (7)	EnergySolutions Arena; 19,802	6–13
20	January 27	@ Denver	L 81–96	Leandro Barbosa (19)	Aaron Gray (11)	Linas Kleiza (4)	Pepsi Center; 18,855	6–14
21	January 29	@ New Jersey	W 94–73	DeMar DeRozan (27)	Ed Davis (9)	José Calderón (9)	Prudential Center; 14,319	7–14
22	January 31	Atlanta	L 77–100	Jerryd Bayless (14)	Ed Davis (11)	José Calderón (9)	Air Canada Centre; 16,117	7–15

February: 4–9 (home: 3–5; road: 1–4)

Game	Date	Team	Score	High points	High rebounds	High assists	Location Attendance	Record
23	February 1	@ Boston	L 64–100	Jerryd Bayless (14)	Ed Davis (12)	José Calderón (7)	TD Garden; 18,624	7–16
24	February 3	Washington	W 106–89	Leandro Barbosa (19)	Amir Johnson (13)	José Calderón (17)	Air Canada Centre; 16,382	8–16
25	February 5	@ Miami	L 89–95	DeMar DeRozan (25)	Ed Davis (8)	James Johnson (4)	American Airlines Arena; 19,802	8–17
26	February 6	@ Washington	L 108–111 (OT)	Linas Kleiza; Jerryd Bayless (30)	Amir Johnson (10)	James Johnson (6)	Verizon Center; 14,687	8–18
27	February 8	Milwaukee	L 99–105	DeMar DeRozan (25)	Linas Kleiza (8)	José Calderón (15)	Air Canada Centre; 15,291	8–19
28	February 10	Boston	W 86–74	DeMar DeRozan (21)	Amir Johnson (12)	José Calderón (14)	Air Canada Centre; 19,207	9–19
29	February 12	L. A. Lakers	L 92–94	José Calderón (30)	Ed Davis (8)	DeMar DeRozan (7)	Air Canada Centre; 19,311	9–20
30	February 14	New York	L 87–90	José Calderón (25)	Linas Kleiza (11)	José Calderón (9)	Air Canada Centre; 20,092	9–21
31	February 15	San Antonio	L 106–113	DeMar DeRozan (29)	Amir Johnson (7)	José Calderón (11)	Air Canada Centre; 15,999	9–22
32	February 17	Charlotte	L 91–98	DeMar DeRozan (24)	Amir Johnson (15)	José Calderón (8)	Air Canada Centre; 15,575	9–23
33	February 22	Detroit	W 103–93	DeMar DeRozan (23)	Aaron Gray (12)	José Calderón (15)	Air Canada Centre; 17,125	10–23
34	February 28	@ Houston	L 85–88	DeMar DeRozan (17)	Ed Davis (15)	José Calderón (7)	Toyota Center; 13,337	10–24
35	February 29	@ New Orleans	W 95–84	Jerryd Bayless; DeMar DeRozan (21)	Amir Johnson (7)	José Calderón (6)	New Orleans Arena; 14,527	11–24

March: 6–11 (home: 4–6; road: 2–5)

Game	Date	Team	Score	High points	High rebounds	High assists	Location Attendance	Record
36	March 2	Memphis	L 99–102	Jerryd Bayless (18)	Aaron Gray; Linas Kleiza (12)	José Calderón (9)	Air Canada Centre; 18,056	11–25
37	March 4	Golden State	W 83–75	DeMar DeRozan (25)	Amir Johnson (13)	Three players (4)	Air Canada Centre; 18,056	12–25
38	March 5	Orlando	L 88–92	DeMar DeRozan (23)	Aaron Gray (11)	James Johnson; José Calderón (7)	Air Canada Centre; 15,392	12–26
39	March 7	Houston	W 116–98	DeMar DeRozan (23)	Amir Johnson (8)	José Calderón (12)	Air Canada Centre; 14,597	13–26
40	March 10	@ Detroit	L 86–105	DeMar DeRozan (15)	Three players (5)	Jerryd Bayless (4)	The Palace of Auburn Hills; 16,090	13–27
41	March 11	Milwaukee	L 99–105	DeMar DeRozan (21)	Ed Davis (10)	Jerryd Bayless (6)	Air Canada Centre; 17,316	13–28
42	March 13	@ Cleveland	W 96–88	Jerryd Bayless (20)	Amir Johnson (9)	Jerryd Bayless (7)	Quicken Loans Arena; 14,203	14–28
43	March 14	@ New Jersey	L 84–98	Jerryd Bayless; James Johnson (16)	Amir Johnson (9)	Jerryd Bayless (10)	Prudential Center; 10,701	14–29
44	March 16	@ Memphis	W 114–110 (OT)	Jerryd Bayless (28)	Andrea Bargnani; James Johnson (7)	Jerryd Bayless (9)	FedExForum; 17,239	15–29
45	March 17	@ Charlotte	L 103–107	Jerryd Bayless (29)	Ed Davis (12)	Jerryd Bayless (6)	Time Warner Cable Arena; 15,108	15–30
46	March 20	@ New York	L 87–106	DeMar DeRozan (17)	Ed Davis (9)	José Calderón (9)	Madison Square Garden; 19,763	15–31
47	March 21	Chicago	L 82–94	DeMar DeRozan (23)	Aaron Gray; Linas Kleiza (8)	José Calderón (8)	Air Canada Centre; 17,869	15–32
48	March 23	New York	W 96–79	DeMar DeRozan (30)	Three players (7)	José Calderón (10)	Air Canada Centre; 19,800	16–32
49	March 24	@ Chicago	L 101–102 (OT)	José Calderón; James Johnson (20)	Gary Forbes (13)	José Calderón (10)	United Center; 21,841	16–33
50	March 26	Orlando	L 101–117	Gary Forbes (21)	Jamaal Magloire (7)	José Calderón (11)	Air Canada Centre; 16,429	16–34
51	March 28	Denver	W 105–96	Andrea Bargnani (26)	Gary Forbes (10)	José Calderón (10)	Air Canada Centre; 15,867	17–34
52	March 30	Miami	L 101–113	DeMar DeRozan (28)	Amir Johnson (12)	José Calderón (16)	Air Canada Centre; 19,883	17–35

April: 6–8 (home: 4–3; road: 2–5)

Game	Date	Team	Score	High points	High rebounds	High assists	Location Attendance	Record
53	April 1	Washington	W 99–92	Andrea Bargnani (18)	Andrea Bargnani; Aaron Gray (8)	José Calderón (8)	Air Canada Centre; 16,858	18–35
54	April 3	Charlotte	W 92–87	Andrea Bargnani (30)	Aaron Gray (9)	José Calderón (11)	Air Canada Centre; 14,640	19–35
55	April 4	@ Philadelphia	W 99–78	Andrea Bargnani (24)	Ed Davis (14)	José Calderón (13)	Wells Fargo Center; 18,186	20–35
56	April 6	Cleveland	L 80–84	DeMar DeRozan (28)	Linas Kleiza (8)	DeMar DeRozan (4)	Air Canada Centre; 16,565	20–36
57	April 8	@ Oklahoma City	L 75–91	José Calderón (19)	Aaron Gray (10)	José Calderón (6)	Chesapeake Energy Arena; 18,203	20–37
58	April 9	@ Indiana	L 98–103	Alan Anderson (17)	Ed Davis (10)	José Calderón (14)	Bankers Life Fieldhouse; 11,021	20–38
59	April 11	Philadelphia	L 75–93	Alan Anderson; Ed Davis (13)	Ed Davis (13)	Ed Davis (5)	Air Canada Centre; 16,324	20–39
60	April 13	Boston	W 84–79	DeMar DeRozan (22)	Ed Davis (12)	Ben Uzoh (5)	Air Canada Centre; 17,270	21–39
61	April 15	@ Atlanta	W 102–86	DeMar DeRozan (23)	Aaron Gray; Linas Kleiza (7)	Justin Dentmon (4)	Philips Arena; 13,845	22–39
62	April 16	Atlanta	L 87–109	DeMar DeRozan (22)	Ben Uzoh (10)	Ben Uzoh (8)	Air Canada Centre; 15,992	22–40
63	April 18	@ Miami	L 72–96	James Johnson (18)	Solomon Alabi; James Johnson (6)	Alan Anderson (3)	American Airlines Arena; 19,600	22–41
64	April 22	@ Detroit	L 73–76	DeMar DeRozan (16)	Solomon Alabi (10)	Gary Forbes; James Johnson (4)	The Palace of Auburn Hills; 14,370	22–42
65	April 23	@ Milwaukee	L 86–92	James Johnson (22)	James Johnson (13)	Gary Forbes; Ben Uzoh (5)	Bradley Center; 13,867	22–43
66	April 26	New Jersey	W 98–67	Ed Davis (24)	Solomon Alabi (19)	Ben Uzoh (12)	Air Canada Centre; 18,161	23–43

2011–12 season schedule

== Player statistics ==
=== Regular season ===
Player	POS	GP	GS	MP	REB	AST	STL	BLK	PTS	MPG	RPG	APG	SPG	BPG	PPG
Ed Davis	PF	66	9	1,534	438	60	40	63	415	23.2	6.6	.9	.6	1.0	6.3
Amir Johnson	PF	64	43	1,553	408	79	33	69	452	24.3	6.4	1.2	.5	1.1	7.1
DeMar DeRozan	SG	63	63	2,206	211	128	48	17	1,054	35.0	3.3	2.0	.8	.3	16.7
James Johnson	SF	62	40	1,561	292	122	71	84	566	25.2	4.7	2.0	1.1	1.4	9.1
José Calderón	PG	53	53	1,799	160	468	47	3	555	33.9	3.0	8.8	.9	.1	10.5
Aaron Gray	C	49	40	813	281	27	22	17	191	16.6	5.7	.6	.4	.3	3.9
Linas Kleiza	SF	49	3	1,057	199	46	23	4	473	21.6	4.1	.9	.5	.1	9.7
Gary Forbes	SG	48	2	713	102	54	24	4	319	14.9	2.1	1.1	.5	.1	6.6
Leandro Barbosa^{†}	SG	42	0	946	79	63	36	7	512	22.5	1.9	1.5	.9	.2	12.2
Rasual Butler	SF	34	14	453	66	19	7	5	110	13.3	1.9	.6	.2	.1	3.2
Jamaal Magloire	C	34	1	374	113	6	4	10	41	11.0	3.3	.2	.1	.3	1.2
Andrea Bargnani	C	31	31	1,032	172	61	18	15	603	33.3	5.5	2.0	.6	.5	19.5
Jerryd Bayless	PG	31	11	705	66	118	24	4	353	22.7	2.1	3.8	.8	.1	11.4
Anthony Carter	PG	24	0	209	33	34	8	4	47	8.7	1.4	1.4	.3	.2	2.0
Alan Anderson	SF	17	12	461	34	26	5	3	163	27.1	2.0	1.5	.3	.2	9.6
Ben Uzoh^{†}	PG	16	8	357	63	59	16	3	77	22.3	3.9	3.7	1.0	.2	4.8
Solomon Alabi	C	14	0	122	47	3	2	9	33	8.7	3.4	.2	.1	.6	2.4
Justin Dentmon^{†}	PG	4	0	72	7	9	1	0	22	18.0	1.8	2.3	.3	.0	5.5

- ^{†} Denotes player spent time with another team in the season. Stats reflect time with the Raptors only.

== Injuries ==
- On March 26 Jerryd Bayless had a partial tear in his left oblique muscle during a game against the Orlando Magic and was out for the remainder of the season.

== Transactions ==
=== Overview ===
Players Added

Via free agency

- Rasual Butler
- Anthony Carter
- Gary Forbes
- Aaron Gray
- Jamaal Magloire

10-day contracts

- Alan Anderson
Players Lost

Via trade

- Leandro Barbosa

Via free agency

- Alexis Ajinça
- Reggie Evans

Waived

- Rasual Butler
- Anthony Carter

=== Trades ===
March 15, 2012	To Toronto Raptors Leandro Barbosa	To Indiana Pacers Future second-round pick Cash considerations

=== Free agents ===
Additions
Player	Date signed	Former team
Jamaal Magloire	December 9	Miami Heat
Rasual Butler	December 10	Chicago Bulls
Aaron Gray	December 11	New Orleans Hornets
Anthony Carter	December 12	New York Knicks
Gary Forbes	December 14	Denver Nuggets

Subtractions
Player	Date signed	New team
Reggie Evans	December 22	Los Angeles Clippers

Many players signed with teams from other leagues due to the 2011 NBA lockout. FIBA allows players under NBA contracts to sign and play for teams from other leagues if the contracts have opt-out clauses that allow the players to return to the NBA if the lockout ends. The Chinese Basketball Association, however, only allows its clubs to sign foreign free agents who could play for at least the entire season.

Played in other leagues during lockout
Player	Date signed	New team	Opt-out clause
Sonny Weems	July 8	Žalgiris Kaunas (Lithuania)	No
Leandro Barbosa	August 18	Flamengo (Brazil)	Yes
Joey Dorsey	September 26	Caja Laboral (Spain)	No
Alexis Ajinça	November 10	Hyères-Toulon (France)	Yes
