= Aaron Gray =

American basketball player (born 1984)

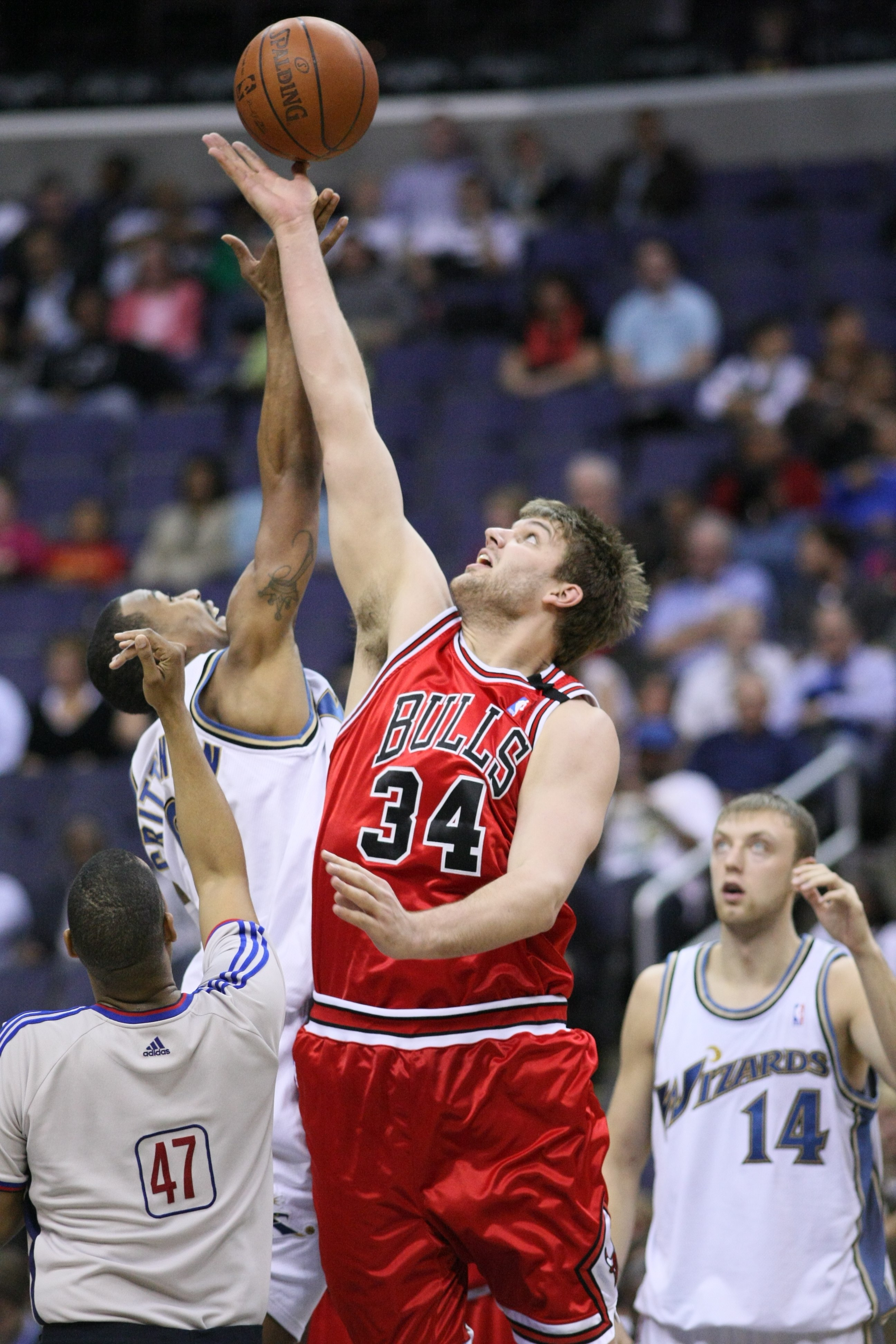
- Gray (in red jersey) with the Chicago Bulls in 2009

Personal information
- Born: December 7, 1984 (age 41) Tarzana, California, U. S.
- Listed height: 7 ft 0 in (2.13 m)
- Listed weight: 270 lb (122 kg)

Career information
- High school: Emmaus (Emmaus, Pennsylvania)
- College: Pittsburgh (2003–2007)
- NBA draft: 2007: 2nd round, 49th overall pick
- Drafted by: Chicago Bulls
- Playing career: 2007–2014
- Position: Center
- Number: 34, 33
- Coaching career: 2015–2018

Career history

Playing
- 2007–2010: Chicago Bulls
- 2010–2011: New Orleans Hornets
- 2011–2013: Toronto Raptors
- 2013–2014: Sacramento Kings
- 2014: Detroit Pistons

Coaching
- 2015–2018: Detroit Pistons (assistant)

Career highlights
- Third-team All-American – AP, NABC (2007); Big East Scholar-Athlete of the Year (2007); 2× First-team All-Big East (2006, 2007); Big East Most Improved Player (2006)
- Stats at NBA.com
- Stats at Basketball Reference

Aaron Michael Gray (born December 7, 1984) is an American former professional basketball player who played seven seasons in the National Basketball Association (NBA). A heart condition forced him into early retirement in 2015.

== Early life and education ==
Gray was born December 7, 1984, in the Tarzana section of Los Angeles, California, and attended Emmaus High School in Emmaus, Pennsylvania.

== High school career ==
Gray played high school basketball for Emmaus High School, which is a member of Pennsylvania's highly competitive East Penn Conference. Gray did not begin playing for the varsity team until the middle of his sophomore season. In Gray's senior season at Emmaus High School, he was named Pennsylvania's Gatorade Player of the Year.

Gray was recruited by major collegiate basketball programs, including Penn State, Pitt, and Rutgers, and committed to Pitt.

== College career ==
While at Pitt, Gray was named a Third Team All-American after helping lead Pitt to the Sweet 16 in the 2007 NCAA Division I tournament in March 2007.

== National Basketball Association ==
At the NBA's pre-draft camp in 2007, Gray was the only player whose height measured at least seven feet without shoes. He was selected with the 49th overall selection by the Chicago Bulls in the 2007 NBA draft.

=== Chicago Bulls (2007–2010) ===
On November 2, 2007, Gray made his NBA debut with the Chicago Bulls against the Philadelphia 76ers. On April 16, 2008, against the Toronto Raptors, he recorded 19 points, 22 rebounds, and two assists in 35 minutes of play. In the 2007–08 season, Gray scored 262 points and recorded 168 rebounds for the Bulls.

=== New Orleans Hornets (2010–2011) ===
On January 25, 2010, the Bulls traded Gray to the New Orleans Hornets for Devin Brown.

On July 15, 2010, the Hornets re-signed Gray.

=== Toronto Raptors (2011–2013) ===
On December 11, 2011, Gray was signed to a one-year contract by the Toronto Raptors.

On July 27, 2012, Gray was re-signed by the Raptors.

On January 28, 2013, Gray recorded a career high 22 points, along with 10 rebounds, in a 114–102 loss to Golden State Warriors.

=== Sacramento Kings (2013–2014) ===
On December 9, 2013, the Raptors traded Gray, Rudy Gay, and Quincy Acy, to the Sacramento Kings for Greivis Vásquez, Patrick Patterson, John Salmons, and Chuck Hayes.

=== Detroit Pistons (2014) ===
On August 18, 2014, Gray signed with the Detroit Pistons. On September 29, 2014, the Pistons announced Gray would miss training camp while rehabbing from a cardiac episode suffered following a voluntary workout in late August. On October 26, 2014, he was waived by the Pistons.

On June 19, 2015, Gray retired after a blood clot was discovered in his heart in the summer of 2014.

== Coaching career ==
=== Detroit Pistons (2015–2018) ===
Following the end of his playing career, Gray joined Stan Van Gundy's staff with the Detroit Pistons as an assistant coach to work with the team's big men and with young prospects of the Grand Rapids Drive, team's NBA G League.

== NBA career statistics ==
Legend
GP	Games played	GS	Games started	MPG	Minutes per game
FG%	Field goal percentage	3P%	3-point field goal percentage	FT%	Free throw percentage
RPG	Rebounds per game	APG	Assists per game	SPG	Steals per game
BPG	Blocks per game	PPG	Points per game	**Bold**	Career high

=== Regular season ===
Year	Team	GP	GS	MPG	FG%	3P%	FT%	RPG	APG	SPG	BPG	PPG
2007–08	Chicago	**61**	1	10.0	.505	.000	.566	2.8	.7	.3	.3	**4.3**
2008–09	Chicago	56	18	12.8	.485	.000	.576	3.9	**.8**	.3	.3	3.5
2009–10	Chicago	8	0	6.3	.381	.000	.286	2.0	.3	.0	.0	2.3
2009–10	New Orleans	24	0	10.9	.557	.000	**.857**	3.8	**.8**	**.4**	**.5**	3.6
2010–11	New Orleans	41	6	13.0	.566	.000	.500	4.2	.4	.3	.3	3.1
2011–12	Toronto	49	**40**	**16.6**	.516	.000	.532	**5.7**	.6	**.4**	.3	3.9
2012–13	Toronto	42	16	12.2	.533	.000	.523	3.2	**.8**	.2	.1	2.8
2013–14	Toronto	4	0	5.0	**.667**	.000	.500	2.0	**.8**	0	0	1.3
2013–14	Sacramento	33	6	10.2	.431	.000	.556	3.1	.6	.3	.2	1.8
Career		318	87	12.1	.509	.000	.562	3.7	.7	.3	.3	3.4

=== Playoffs ===
Year	Team	GP	GS	MPG	FG%	3P%	FT%	RPG	APG	SPG	BPG	PPG
2009	Chicago	2	0	4.5	.000	.000	.000	.5	.0	.0	.0	.0
2011	New Orleans	**6**	0	**14.5**	**.692**	.000	**.375**	**3.5**	**.3**	**.3**	**.3**	**3.5**
Career		8	0	12.0	.600	.000	.375	2.8	.3	.3	.3	2.6
