= Amir Johnson =

American basketball player (born 1987)

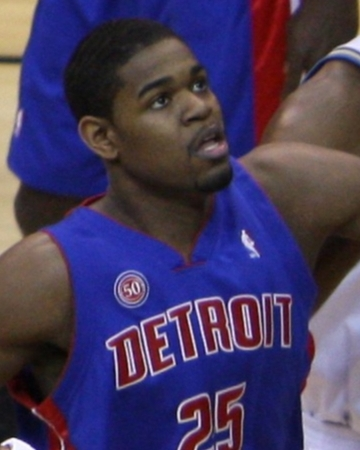
- Johnson with the Detroit Pistons in 2008

Los Angeles Clippers
- Title: Player development coach
- League: NBA

Personal information
- Born: May 1, 1987 (age 39) Los Angeles, California, U.S.
- Listed height: 6 ft 9 in (2.06 m)
- Listed weight: 253 lb (115 kg)

Career information
- High school: Verbum Dei (Los Angeles, California); Westchester (Los Angeles, California)
- NBA draft: 2005: 2nd round, 56th overall pick
- Drafted by: Detroit Pistons
- Playing career: 2005–2022
- Position: Power forward / center
- Number: 5, 15, 25, 90

Career history

Playing
- 2005–2009: Detroit Pistons
- 2006: →Fayetteville Patriots
- 2007: →Sioux Falls Skyforce
- 2009–2015: Toronto Raptors
- 2015–2017: Boston Celtics
- 2017–2019: Philadelphia 76ers
- 2019: →Delaware Blue Coats
- 2020–2022: NBA G League Ignite

Coaching
- 2023–2024: NBA G League Ignite (assistant)
- 2024–present: Los Angeles Clippers (player development)

Career highlights
- McDonald's All-American (2005); Second-team Parade All-American (2005); California Mr. Basketball (2005)
- Stats at NBA.com
- Stats at Basketball Reference

Amir Jalla Johnson (born May 1, 1987) is an American professional basketball coach and former player who is a player development coach for the Los Angeles Clippers of the National Basketball Association (NBA). He has previously played for the Detroit Pistons, the team that selected Johnson in the second round of the 2005 NBA draft, as well as the Toronto Raptors, Boston Celtics and Philadelphia 76ers.

== Early life ==
Born in Los Angeles, Johnson grew up mainly in South Central Los Angeles, but also spent time as a child in Harbor City and Watts. Despite being tall and athletic, Johnson struggled to find a place on a high school basketball team. His freshman year was split at two schools (Pacific Hills, Narbonne), neither of which featured him on the court. From there, he enrolled at Verbum Dei High School, where he enjoyed a solid inaugural season of high school basketball as a sophomore in 2002–03. He then transferred to Westchester High School but was forced to sit out his junior year of 2003–04. He made up for lost time as a senior in 2004–05 as he was named the 2005 California Mr. Basketball after leading Westchester to a state title. He was subsequently named a McDonald's All-American and appeared in the 2005 Boys Game.

Considered a four-star recruit by Rivals.com, Johnson was listed as the No. 7 power forward and the No. 29 player in the nation in 2005.

Despite committing to play for the University of Louisville, Johnson decided to skip college and declared for NBA draft.

== Professional career ==
=== Detroit Pistons (2005–2009) ===
Johnson was selected by the Detroit Pistons with the 56th overall pick in the 2005 NBA draft. He is the last direct from high school player to be selected in the NBA draft (until 2015 with Satnam Singh Bhamara), as the NBA instituted a rule prior to the 2006 draft that requires American players to be at least one year removed from the graduation of their high school class to be eligible.

As a rookie for the Pistons, Johnson appeared in just three games during the 2005–06 season. He scored his first NBA basket on a windmill dunk against the Minnesota Timberwolves on January 24, 2006. On February 27, 2006, he was assigned to the Fayetteville Patriots of the NBA Development League. After appearing in 18 games for the Patriots, he was recalled by the Pistons on April 17, 2006. That same day, he scored 18 points for the Pistons in their 20-point loss to the Milwaukee Bucks, making all six of his field goal attempts, both three-point attempts, and all four of his free throw attempts.

Johnson spent most of the 2006–07 season playing for the Sioux Falls Skyforce of the NBA Development League, where he earned Player of the Week honors for his play. In 22 games for the Skyforce, Johnson averaged 18.9 points, 9.7 rebounds, 2.1 assists, 1.2 steals and 3.1 blocks per game, while shooting 62.3% from the field. Despite his strong D-League play, Johnson managed just eight games for the Pistons in 2006–07, averaging 5.9 points, 4.6 rebounds and 1.6 blocks per game.

On July 12, 2007, Johnson re-signed with the Pistons to a three-year, $12 million contract. Over the next two seasons, Johnson played a total of 124 games for the Pistons as he became a valuable asset off the bench. He averaged 3.6 points and 3.8 rebounds in 2007–08, and 3.5 points and 3.7 rebounds in 2008–09. He also averaged 1.1 blocks per game over the two seasons.

=== Toronto Raptors (2009–2015) ===
On June 23, 2009, Johnson was traded to the Milwaukee Bucks in a three three-team trade that also involved the San Antonio Spurs and Richard Jefferson. He was later traded to the Toronto Raptors on August 18, 2009, along with Sonny Weems, in exchange for Carlos Delfino and Roko Ukić.

On July 8, 2010, Johnson re-signed with the Raptors to a five-year, $34 million contract.

Johnson had a career-best season in 2012–13 as he averaged career-highs in minutes played (28.7 mpg), points (10.0 ppg), rebounds (7.5 rpg), assists (1.5 apg) and steals (1.0 spg). With his continued rise in dominance and overall production, Johnson began to embrace the city of Toronto, quoting that "Toronto is part of me. I've been around, the people are very kind, I love it here."

On December 8, 2013, Johnson scored a career-high 32 points in a 106–94 win over the Los Angeles Lakers.

=== Boston Celtics (2015–2017) ===
On July 9, 2015, Johnson signed a two-year, $24 million contract with the Boston Celtics. He made his debut for the Celtics in the team's season opener against the Philadelphia 76ers on October 28, recording 15 points and 7 rebounds off the bench in a 112–95 win. On January 13, 2016, he recorded 14 points and a season-high 18 rebounds in a 103–94 win over the Indiana Pacers. On March 20, he scored a season-high 18 points in a 120–105 win over the Philadelphia 76ers. He finished the 2015–16 season with averages of 7.3 points and 6.4 rebounds per game.

On November 2, 2016, Johnson scored 23 points and hit a career-high four three-pointers in a 107–100 win over the Chicago Bulls.

=== Philadelphia 76ers (2017–2019) ===
On July 8, 2017, Johnson signed with the Philadelphia 76ers. On June 25, 2018, he was named the winner of the NBA Hustle Award during the 2018 NBA Awards.

On July 16, 2018, Johnson re-signed with the 76ers. On February 22, 2019, he volunteered to play for the Delaware Blue Coats of the NBA G League because he had not appeared in a game for the 76ers since January 26.

On April 13, 2019, during a nationally televised playoff game between Philadelphia and the Brooklyn Nets, Johnson was caught by ESPN cameras sitting on the bench during the game taking a cell phone out of his pocket to show teammate Joel Embiid a text message, while the Sixers were trailing by ten points. Moments later, Johnson was removed from the bench and returned to the locker room. Johnson was not active for the game. At the post game press conference, Embiid stated that Johnson's daughter was very ill and he just looked at the message. After the game, Johnson issued an apology through a statement and was fined an undisclosed amount by the 76ers for violating the NBA's rule against cell phones on the bench. Johnson did not re-sign with the team following the season.

=== NBA G League Ignite (2020–2022) ===
On November 12, 2020, Johnson was announced as addition to the NBA G League Ignite. His spot on the roster was confirmed on February 1, 2021.

On October 28, 2021, Johnson re-signed with the Ignite.

Johnson did not return to an NBA roster after his time with the Ignite. Thus, his final NBA game was played during Game 6 of the 2019 Eastern Conference Semifinals against the Raptors. The 76ers emptied their bench when they had a 19-point lead with three and a half minutes remaining in the game. This was Johnson's only playing time that game and he grabbed two rebounds as the 76ers won 112 - 101. Johnson did not play in Game 7 of this series and the 76ers would fall to the Raptors 90 - 92 and be eliminated from the playoffs.

== Coaching career ==
=== NBA G League Ignite (2023–2024) ===
On October 30, 2023, Johnson was hired as an assistant coach by the NBA G League Ignite.

=== Los Angeles Clippers (2024–present) ===
On August 29, 2024, Johnson was hired as a player development coach for the Los Angeles Clippers.

== NBA career statistics ==
Legend
| GP | Games played | GS | Games started | MPG | Minutes per game |
| FG% | Field goal percentage | 3P% | 3-point field goal percentage | FT% | Free throw percentage |
| RPG | Rebounds per game | APG | Assists per game | SPG | Steals per game |
| BPG | Blocks per game | PPG | Points per game | **Bold** | Career high |
| * | Led the league |

=== Regular season ===
| Year | Team | GP | GS | MPG | FG% | 3P% | FT% | RPG | APG | SPG | BPG | PPG |
|---|---|---|---|---|---|---|---|---|---|---|---|---|
| 2005–06 | Detroit | 3 | 0 | 13.0 | **.700** | **.667** | **1.000** | 1.3 | 1.0 | .0 | .7 | 6.7 |
| 2006–07 | Detroit | 8 | 0 | 15.5 | .545 | .000 | .786 | 4.6 | .4 | .6 | **1.6** | 5.9 |
| 2007–08 | Detroit | 62 | 0 | 12.3 | .558 | – | .673 | 3.8 | .5 | .4 | 1.3 | 3.6 |
| 2008–09 | Detroit | 62 | 24 | 14.7 | .595 | – | .657 | 3.7 | .3 | .3 | 1.0 | 3.5 |
| 2009–10 | Toronto | **82*** | 5 | 17.7 | .623 | .000 | .638 | 4.8 | .6 | .5 | .8 | 6.2 |
| 2010–11 | Toronto | 72 | 54 | 25.7 | .568 | .000 | .787 | 6.4 | 1.1 | .7 | 1.2 | 9.6 |
| 2011–12 | Toronto | 64 | 43 | 24.3 | .576 | .400 | .690 | 6.4 | 1.2 | .5 | 1.1 | 7.1 |
| 2012–13 | Toronto | 81 | 38 | 28.7 | .554 | .385 | .727 | **7.5** | 1.5 | **1.0** | 1.4 | 10.0 |
| 2013–14 | Toronto | 77 | 72 | **28.8** | .562 | .303 | .636 | 6.6 | 1.5 | .7 | 1.1 | **10.4** |
| 2014–15 | Toronto | 75 | 72 | 26.4 | .574 | .413 | .612 | 6.1 | 1.6 | .6 | .8 | 9.3 |
| 2015–16 | Boston | 79 | 76 | 22.8 | .585 | .233 | .570 | 6.4 | 1.7 | .7 | 1.1 | 7.3 |
| 2016–17 | Boston | 80 | **77** | 20.1 | .576 | .409 | .670 | 4.6 | **1.8** | .6 | .8 | 6.5 |
| 2017–18 | Philadelphia | 74 | 18 | 15.8 | .538 | .313 | .612 | 4.5 | 1.6 | .6 | .6 | 4.6 |
| 2018–19 | Philadelphia | 51 | 6 | 10.4 | .503 | .300 | .756 | 2.9 | 1.2 | .3 | .3 | 3.9 |
| Career | | 870 | 485 | 21.1 | .570 | .332 | .673 | 5.4 | 1.2 | .6 | 1.0 | 7.0 |

=== Playoffs ===
| Year | Team | GP | GS | MPG | FG% | 3P% | FT% | RPG | APG | SPG | BPG | PPG |
|---|---|---|---|---|---|---|---|---|---|---|---|---|
| 2008 | Detroit | 8 | 0 | 5.4 | .750 | .000 | .500 | 1.6 | .1 | .0 | .4 | 2.6 |
| 2009 | Detroit | 3 | 0 | 4.3 | **1.000** | – | – | 1.0 | .0 | .0 | .3 | .7 |
| 2014 | Toronto | 7 | 7 | 27.3 | .654 | .000 | .750 | 6.0 | 1.0 | **.4** | .6 | 11.0 |
| 2015 | Toronto | 4 | 2 | **28.0** | .690 | .000 | .500 | 7.0 | 1.0 | .3 | .8 | **11.5** |
| 2016 | Boston | 6 | 6 | 22.3 | .667 | .000 | .778 | **7.2** | .7 | .2 | **1.3** | 8.5 |
| 2017 | Boston | **14** | **9** | 10.1 | .500 | **.333** | .625 | 2.1 | .2 | .3 | .4 | 2.6 |
| 2018 | Philadelphia | 8 | 1 | 11.8 | .524 | – | **.800** | 2.9 | **1.1** | .3 | .1 | 3.3 |
| 2019 | Philadelphia | 4 | 0 | 5.0 | **1.000** | – | – | 1.3 | .5 | .3 | .0 | 2.0 |
| Career | | 54 | 25 | 13.9 | .637 | .111 | .654 | 3.5 | .6 | .2 | .5 | 4.9 |

== Personal life ==
Johnson grew up in an athletic family. His sister, Indi, played forward for Southern University's women's basketball team, while his cousins, Kevin and Kaelin Burnett, both played linebacker in the NFL.

Johnson is highly involved in community work, and regularly hosts back to school programs, visits local hospitals and pays for low income youth to attend games. He is also known for his random acts of kindness. Shortly after the release of Drake's Nothing Was the Same album, Johnson bought all the copies from two local stores and handed them out to random pedestrians in Toronto.

== See also ==
- List of NBA career field goal percentage leaders
