= Ben Uzoh =

Nigerian-American basketball player (born 1988)

Personal information
- Born: March 18, 1988 (age 38) Houston, Texas, U.S.
- Listed height: 6 ft 3 in (1.91 m)
- Listed weight: 205 lb (93 kg)

Career information
- High school: Warren (San Antonio, Texas)
- College: Tulsa (2006–2010)
- NBA draft: 2010: undrafted
- Playing career: 2010–2022
- Position: Point guard
- Number: 18, 6

Career history
- 2010–2011: New Jersey Nets
- 2011: →Springfield Armor
- 2011: Lokomotiv Kuban
- 2012: Rio Grande Valley Vipers
- 2012: Cleveland Cavaliers
- 2012: Toronto Raptors
- 2012–2013: Springfield Armor
- 2013–2014: Tulsa 66ers
- 2014: Canton Charge
- 2015: Lagos Islanders
- 2017: Okapi Aalstar
- 2018: Caballeros de Culiacan
- 2019–2020: Paris
- 2021: Rivers Hoopers
- 2021: Cape Town Tigers
- 2022: Marinos

Career highlights
- South African League champion (2021); CIBACOPA All-Star (2018); First-team All-Conference USA (2010); 2× Second-team All-Conference USA (2008, 2009); Conference USA All-Freshman team (2007)
- Stats at NBA.com
- Stats at Basketball Reference
Medals
Men's basketball
Representing Nigeria
FIBA Africa Championship
Gold medal – first place	2015 Tunisia

Benjamin Chukwukelo Uzoh (born March 18, 1988) is a Nigerian-American former basketball player. He played in international competitions for Nigeria. Standing at 6 ft 3 in (1.91 m) and playing at the point guard, Uzoh played in the National Basketball Association (NBA) for the New Jersey Nets and Toronto Raptors. He also played for several teams across North America, Europe, South America and Africa.

== College career ==
Uzoh played for the Tulsa Golden Hurricane over his four-year college basketball career.

Freshman	Sophomore	Junior	Senior
9.9 PPG	15.6 PPG	14.0 PPG	15.3 PPG
5.0 RPG	5.4 RPG	4.9 RPG	4.7 RPG
1.5 APG	2.3 APG	4.7 APG	4.7 APG

Uzoh is the only player in school history to be ranked top 10 among points, rebounds, assists, steals and blocks. He's a three-time All-Conference USA recipient including his selection to the first team his senior year. He started in 140 out of 141 games in his college career.

== Professional career ==
In the summer of 2010, Uzoh earned Portsmouth Invitational Tournament All Third Team.

After going undrafted in the 2010 NBA draft, Uzoh signed a partially guaranteed contract with the New Jersey Nets of the National Basketball Association. On January 5, 2011, Uzoh was given a guaranteed contract to play out the rest of the year in New Jersey. He was briefly assigned to the Springfield Armor of the NBA D-League, during the month of March 2011.

In October 2011, he signed a one-year contract with Lokomotiv Kuban of the Russian League, but was released after playing just two games.

On March 27, 2012, he signed a 10-day contract with the Toronto Raptors of the National Basketball Association. On April 16, 2012, the Raptors announced they had signed Ben Uzoh for the remainder of the 2011–2012 season. He recorded a triple-double on April 26, against the Nets, the first by a Raptor in eleven years.

Uzoh joined the Denver Nuggets for their training camp in October 2012, but did not make the team's final roster. He was then acquired by the D-League team the Rio Grande Valley Vipers. However, on November 5, 2012, Uzoh was traded to the Armor for Tim Ohlbrecht.

On October 31, 2013, Uzoh was acquired by the Tulsa 66ers in a trade involving the Iowa Energy and the Springfield Armor. On January 22, 2014, he was traded to the Canton Charge. On March 21, 2014, he was waived by the Charge due to a season-ending injury.

Ben Uzoh went to Nigeria in 2015 where he signed on to play for the Lagos Islanders.

On March 12, 2017, Uzoh signed with Belgian club Okapi Aalstar for the rest of the 2016–17 season.

On February 10, 2018, he signed with Caballeros de Culiacan of the CIBACOPA league in Mexico. He earned league All-Star honors.

On November 24, 2019, Uzoh signed with Paris Basketball of the LNB Pro B. On January 20, 2020, Paris Basketball and Uzoh jointly decided not to continue their collaboration.

In April 2021, Uzoh signed with the Nigerian team Rivers Hoopers to play in the inaugural season of the Basketball Africa League (BAL). He scored the first-ever points in the BAL in the season opener against Patriots BBC. He also became the first ex-NBA player to play in the newly established competition. The Hoopers were eliminated in the regular season after two losses and one win, with Uzoh averaging a team-leading 14.7 points per game.

In September 2021, Uzoh was on the roster of South African team Cape Town Tigers and helped the team win its first-ever national championship. He recorded 22 points, 5 rebounds and 5 assists in the championship game against Jozi Nuggets.

On July 4, 2022, he signed with Marinos of the Venezuelan SuperLiga.

== Post-playing career ==
In October 2023, Uzoh became a scout for his former team, the Toronto Raptors of the National Basketball Association (NBA).

== National team career ==
Uzoh has played for the Nigerian national basketball team at the 2013, 2015, and 2017 FIBA Men's African Championships. He was also a member of the Nigerian team that participated at the Rio 2016 Olympic Games.

Afrobasket 2013	AfroBasket 2015	Rio Olympics 2016	Fiba World Cup 2019
10.6 PPG	5.6 RPG	5.0 APG	6.8 PPG
8.1 PPG	3.1 RPG	3.0 APG	2.2 APG
7.4 PPG	1.4 RPG	2.6 APG	1.6 RPG

== Career statistics ==
Legend
GP	Games played	GS	Games started	MPG	Minutes per game
FG%	Field goal percentage	3P%	3-point field goal percentage	FT%	Free throw percentage
RPG	Rebounds per game	APG	Assists per game	SPG	Steals per game
BPG	Blocks per game	PPG	Points per game	**Bold**	Career high

=== NBA ===
==== Regular season ====
Year	Team	GP	GS	MPG	FG%	3P%	FT%	RPG	APG	SPG	BPG	PPG
2010–11	New Jersey	**42**	0	10.4	**.424**	**.375**	**.589**	1.5	1.6	0.3	**0.2**	3.8
2011–12	Cleveland	2	0	6.5	.400	.000	.000	2.0	1.0	0.5	0.0	2.0
2011–12	Toronto	16	**8**	**22.3**	.351	.000	.579	**3.9**	**3.7**	**1.0**	**0.2**	**4.8**
Career		60	8	13.5	.395	.333	.587	2.1	2.2	0.5	0.2	4.0

=== BAL ===
Year	Team	GP	GS	MPG	FG%	3P%	FT%	RPG	APG	SPG	BPG	PPG
2021	Rivers Hoopers	3	3	29.1	.559	.000	.667	4.7	5.3	1.0	.7	14.7
Career		3	3	29.1	.559	.000	.667	4.7	5.3	1.0	.7	14.7
