= Alan Anderson (basketball) =

American basketball player (born 1982)

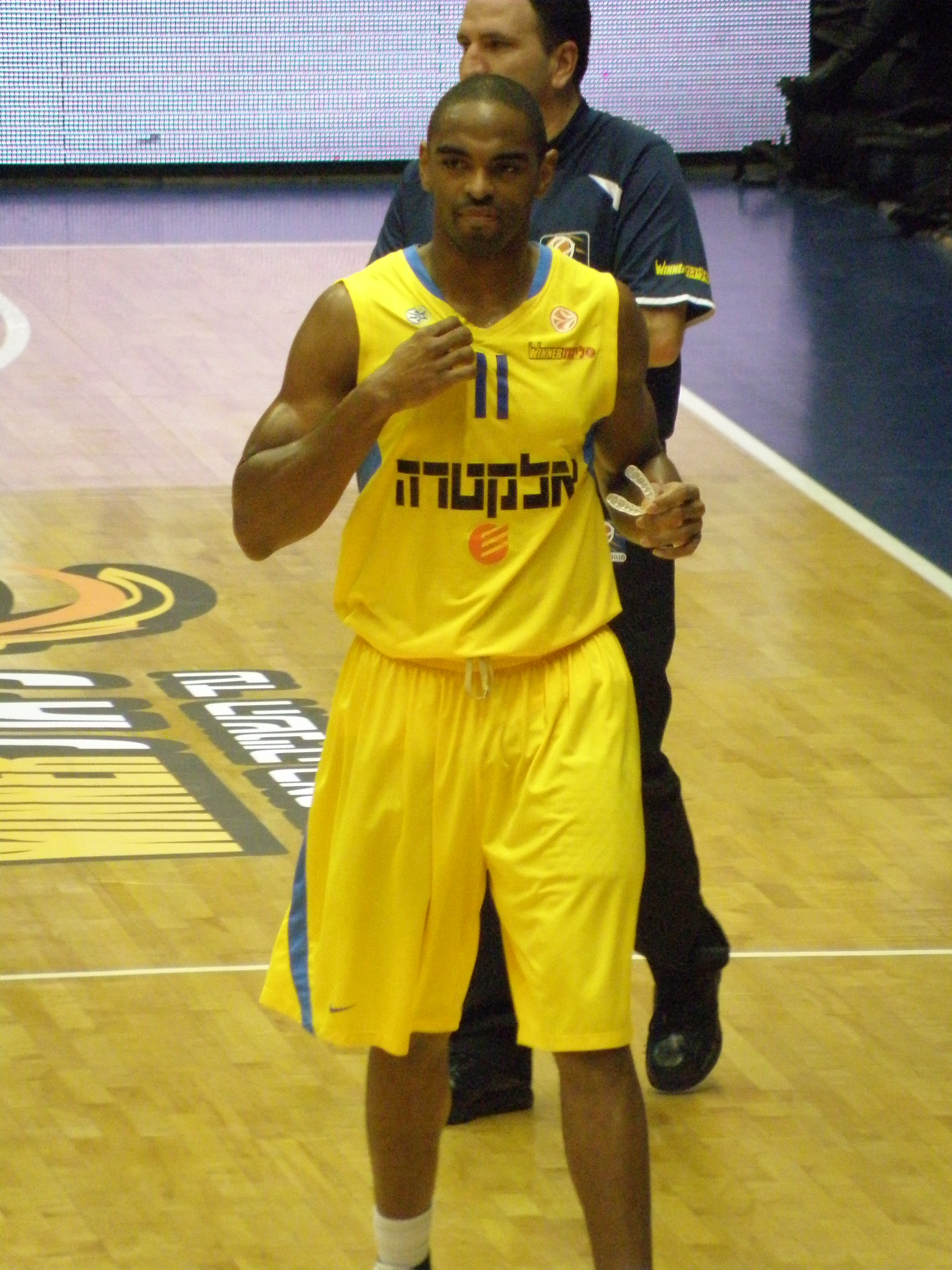
- Anderson with Maccabi Tel Aviv in 2010

Personal information
- Born: October 16, 1982 (age 43) Minneapolis, Minnesota, U.S.
- Listed height: 6 ft 6 in (1.98 m)
- Listed weight: 220 lb (100 kg)

Career information
- High school: Edison (Minneapolis, Minnesota); DeLaSalle (Minneapolis, Minnesota)
- College: Michigan State (2001–2005)
- NBA draft: 2005: undrafted
- Playing career: 2005–2018
- Position: Shooting guard / small forward
- Number: 15, 6, 9, 11, 32

Career history
- 2005–2006: Charlotte Bobcats
- 2006–2007: Tulsa 66ers
- 2007: Charlotte Bobcats
- 2007–2008: Virtus Bologna
- 2008: Triumph Lyubertsy
- 2008–2009: Cibona
- 2009–2010: Maccabi Tel Aviv
- 2010: New Mexico Thunderbirds
- 2010–2011: FC Barcelona
- 2011–2012: Shandong Lions
- 2012: Canton Charge
- 2012–2013: Toronto Raptors
- 2013–2015: Brooklyn Nets
- 2015–2016: Washington Wizards
- 2016–2017: Los Angeles Clippers
- 2018: Lakeland Magic

Career highlights
- Croatian Cup MVP (2009); Spanish King's Cup MVP (2011); Fourth-team Parade All-American (2001)
- Stats at NBA.com
- Stats at Basketball Reference

Alan Jeffery Anderson (born October 16, 1982) is an American former professional basketball player. He played for eight seasons in the National Basketball Association (NBA) with the Charlotte Bobcats, Toronto Raptors, Brooklyn Nets, Washington Wizards and Los Angeles Clippers. Anderson also played internationally in Italy, Russia, Croatia, Israel, Spain and China.

== College career ==
Anderson attended Michigan State University (MSU), where he played college basketball with the Michigan State Spartans men's basketball team.

During his college career he was one of MSU's best ball handlers. He was the team's primary point guard during his junior season. Anderson, as a college senior, averaged 13.2 points, 5.6 rebounds and 1.7 assists per game, earning All-Big Ten Conference Team honors. He also helped lead the Spartans to the 2005 NCAA Men's Division I Basketball Tournament's Final Four. He was voted the team's MVP by the team's players and the media as a senior. He earned his bachelor's degree in family community services from Michigan State in August 2005.

== Professional career ==
=== Charlotte Bobcats (2005–2006) ===
Anderson signed with the Charlotte Bobcats in August 2005. He was waived by the Bobcats on November 28, 2006. but re-signed him on March 17, 2007, for the rest of the 2006–07 season.

=== Tulsa 66ers (2006–2007) ===
Anderson played with the NBA D-League's Tulsa 66ers during the 2006–07 season., averaging 15.8 points per game.

=== Return to Charlotte (2007) ===
Anderson was re-signed by the Charlotte Bobcats on March 17, 2007, for the rest of the 2006–07 season.

=== Virtus Bologna (2007–2008) ===
On September 13, 2007, Anderson signed a contract with the Italian League club Virtus Bologna.

=== Triumph Lyubertsy (2008) ===
After spending one season with Bologna, Anderson signed with the Russian League club Triumph Lyubertsy in 2008.

=== Cibona Zagreb (2008–2009) ===
Anderson joined the Adriatic League club Cibona Zagreb on December 31, 2008.

=== Maccabi Tel Aviv (2009–2010) ===
On May 24, 2009, Anderson signed with the Israeli League club Maccabi Tel Aviv. He left after one year.

=== New Mexico Thunderbirds (2010) ===
Anderson was selected by the New Mexico Thunderbirds with the second overall pick in the 2010 NBA Development League draft. Through 10 games with New Mexico, Anderson averaged 21.3 points per game, including a season high of 34 points against the Idaho Stampede on November 20.

=== FC Barcelona (2010–2011) ===
On December 21, 2010, Anderson signed with Spanish League club FC Barcelona, the 2009–10 EuroLeague champion. He was voted MVP of the 2010–11 Spanish King's Cup. Anderson was a key player in the final, chalking up 19 points in the win. He left after one season.

=== Toronto Raptors (2012–2013) ===
On March 26, 2012, Anderson signed a 10-day contract with the Toronto Raptors. On April 17, 2012, Anderson signed with the Toronto Raptors for the remainder of the 2011–12 season. While playing in Toronto he was able to win the trust of Dwane Casey and started over James Johnson. Out of his 17 games with the Toronto Raptors he started 12, averaging 9.6 points per game in 27.1 minutes. He re-signed with the Raptors on July 30, 2012. During his time with the Raptors, Anderson became a bit of a polarizing figure amongst fans. Some praised his defensive efforts, while others referred to him as a ball-hog, the latter was especially evident after his overtime performance against the Miami Heat on January 23, 2013. Upon making two baskets in overtime, Anderson proceeded to shoot on 6 of 8 offensive possessions afterwards, missing all of his next shots (5 of those attempts and misses were 3-point attempts). Despite the poor showing, he finished the season with the Raptors before becoming an unrestricted free agent.

=== Brooklyn Nets (2013–2015) ===
On July 30, 2013, Anderson signed with the Brooklyn Nets. On July 15, 2014, he re-signed with the Nets.

=== Washington Wizards (2015–2016) ===
On July 12, 2015, Anderson signed with the Washington Wizards. On October 13, 2015, he had successful surgery on his left ankle and was ruled out for the first half of the 2015–16 season. Anderson made his debut for the Wizards on February 24, 2016, scoring nine points in 16 minutes against the Chicago Bulls.

=== Los Angeles Clippers (2016–2017 ===
On August 3, 2016, Anderson signed with the Los Angeles Clippers.

=== Lakeland Magic (2018) ===
On February 10, 2018, Anderson was acquired off waivers by the Lakeland Magic of the NBA G League.

Anderson also played for the Triplets of the Big3.

== Career statistics ==
Legend
GP	Games played	GS	Games started	MPG	Minutes per game
FG%	Field-goal percentage	3P%	3-point field-goal percentage	FT%	Free-throw percentage
RPG	Rebounds per game	APG	Assists per game	SPG	Steals per game
BPG	Blocks per game	PPG	Points per game	PIR	Performance index rating
**Bold**	Career high

=== College ===
Year	Team	GP	GS	MPG	FG%	3P%	FT%	RPG	APG	SPG	BPG	PPG
2001–02	Michigan State	31	23	24.5	.450	**.500**	.770	4.2	1.6	.6	.1	6.5
2002–03	Michigan State	32	28	27.6	.503	.308	.842	3.7	**3.3**	.7	**.3**	9.8
2003–04	Michigan State	30	26	**28.7**	.467	.354	.805	3.1	3.2	1.0	.2	8.1
2004–05	Michigan State	**33**	**33**	26.6	**.556**	.385	**.877**	**5.6**	1.7	**1.0**	.2	**13.2**
Career		126	110	26.8	.503	.366	.831	4.2	2.4	.8	.2	9.5

=== NBA ===
==== Regular season ====
Year	Team	GP	GS	MPG	FG%	3P%	FT%	RPG	APG	SPG	BPG	PPG
2005–06	Charlotte	36	7	15.7	.414	**.414**	.805	1.9	.9	.3	.1	5.8
2006–07	Charlotte	17	0	15.1	**.457**	.250	.826	1.9	1.2	.4	.0	5.8
2011–12	Toronto	17	12	**27.1**	.387	.393	.853	2.0	1.5	.3	**.2**	9.6
2012–13	Toronto	65	2	23.0	.383	.333	**.857**	2.3	**1.6**	.7	.1	**10.7**
2013–14	Brooklyn	**78**	**26**	22.7	.400	.339	.780	2.2	1.0	.6	.1	7.2
2014–15	Brooklyn	74	19	23.6	.443	.348	.812	**2.8**	1.1	**.8**	.1	7.4
2015–16	Washington	13	0	14.8	.356	.324	.733	2.1	1.1	.3	.1	5.0
2016–17	L.A. Clippers	30	0	10.3	.375	.318	.750	.8	.4	.1	.0	2.9
Career		330	66	20.6	.405	.344	.816	2.2	1.1	.6	.1	7.3

==== Playoffs ====
Year	Team	GP	GS	MPG	FG%	3P%	FT%	RPG	APG	SPG	BPG	PPG
2014	Brooklyn	**12**	**2**	21.8	.403	.290	**.667**	2.7	**1.3**	**.8**	.0	5.9
2015	Brooklyn	6	0	**23.7**	**.610**	**.625**	**.667**	**3.5**	1.2	.7	**.2**	**11.0**
Career		18	2	22.4	.485	.404	.667	2.9	1.2	.8	.1	7.6

=== EuroLeague ===
Year	Team	GP	GS	MPG	FG%	3P%	FT%	RPG	APG	SPG	BPG	PPG	PIR
2007–08	Virtus Bologna	9	4	25.6	.398	.250	**.909**	3.0	1.1	1.1	.3	11.2	9.6
2008–09	Cibona	8	7	**31.4**	.383	.394	.841	**4.8**	2.0	**2.0**	**.5**	**15.3**	**14.8**
2009–10	Maccabi	**20**	**18**	28.4	.434	.339	.800	3.6	**2.3**	1.6	.2	13.7	13.1
2010–11	Barcelona	10	10	27.2	**.448**	**.455**	.844	3.1	1.5	.6	.2	11.4	10.6
Career		47	39	28.2	.420	.365	.832	3.6	1.8	1.4	.3	13.0	12.1

== Personal life ==
On February 10, 2023, Anderson was sentenced to 24 months in prison for his involvement in a health care fraud scheme. He was arrested in 2021 after he was accused of submitting fraudulent claims and recruiting other players to join the scheme.
