= Quincy Acy =

American basketball player (born 1990)

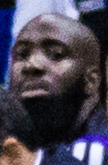
- Acy in 2013

Dallas Mavericks
- Title: Assistant coach
- League: NBA

Personal information
- Born: October 6, 1990 (age 36) Tyler, Texas, U.S.
- Listed height: 6 ft 7 in (2.01 m)
- Listed weight: 240 lb (109 kg)

Career information
- High school: John Horn (Mesquite, Texas)
- College: Baylor (2008–2012)
- NBA draft: 2012: 2nd round, 37th overall pick
- Drafted by: Toronto Raptors
- Playing career: 2012–2022
- Position: Power forward
- Number: 4, 5, 13, 1, 2
- Coaching career: 2023–present

Career history

Playing
- 2012–2013: Toronto Raptors
- 2012–2013: →Bakersfield Jam
- 2013–2014: Sacramento Kings
- 2014–2015: New York Knicks
- 2015–2016: Sacramento Kings
- 2016: Dallas Mavericks
- 2016–2017: Texas Legends
- 2017–2018: Brooklyn Nets
- 2019: Phoenix Suns
- 2019: Texas Legends
- 2019: Shenzhen Leopards
- 2019–2020: Maccabi Tel Aviv
- 2021–2022: Olympiacos

Coaching
- 2023–2025: Wichita State (assistant)
- 2026–present: Dallas Mavericks (assistant)

Career highlights
- Israeli League champion (2020); Greek League champion (2022); Greek Cup Winner (2022); Second-team All-Big 12 (2012); Big 12 All-Defensive Team (2012); Big 12 Sixth Man Award (2011)
- Stats at NBA.com
- Stats at Basketball Reference

Quincy Jyrome Acy (born October 6, 1990) is an American assistant basketball coach for the Dallas Mavericks of the National Basketball Association (NBA) and former professional player. He played college basketball for the Baylor Bears. Acy played seven seasons in the NBA for the Toronto Raptors, Sacramento Kings, New York Knicks, Dallas Mavericks, Brooklyn Nets, and Phoenix Suns. He also played in the NBA Development League and overseas in China, Israel and Greece.

== Early life ==
Acy was born in Tyler, Texas to parents who divorced when he was young. He was raised in Dallas by his mother, Renata King, who worked as an elementary school teacher.

== High school career ==
Acy attended John Horn High School in Mesquite, Texas. As a senior in 2007–08, he averaged 17.8 points and 7.8 rebounds per game. Considered a four-star recruit by Rivals.com, Acy was listed as the No. 25 power forward and the No. 84 player in the nation in 2008.

== College career ==
As a freshman at Baylor in 2008–09, Acy earned Big 12 All-Freshman team honors from the media and was named Big 12 Co-Rookie of the Week on November 24, 2008. He ranked sixth on the team in scoring (5.4) and fourth in rebounding (3.6), while leading Bears in blocked shots (34). He set Big 12 and Baylor records with 20 consecutive field goals made—he made his first 20 field goals of his career, starting on November 15 and ending on November 24.

As a sophomore in 2009–10, Acy averaged 9.3 points and 5.1 rebounds per game as Baylor's sixth man. He was subsequently named to the Big 12 All-Reserve team by the media.

As a junior in 2010–11, Acy averaged 12.4 points and 7.6 rebounds per game. In the first round of the Big 12 men's basketball tournament, Acy recorded a team-high 21 points and a career-high 15 rebounds in a loss to Oklahoma. Following the season, he earned the Big 12 Sixth Man Award and was named All-Big 12 Honorable Mention.

As a senior in 2011–12, Acy averaged 12.0 points and 7.4 rebounds per game. Following the season, he was named to the All-Big 12 second team and the Big 12 All-Defensive team.

== Professional career ==
=== Toronto Raptors (2012–2013) ===
On June 29, 2012, Acy was selected by the Toronto Raptors with the 37th overall pick in the 2012 NBA draft. On July 16, 2012, he signed a multi-year contract with the Raptors. He played sparingly for Toronto in 2012–13 and earned two assignments to the NBA Development League, where he played for the Bakersfield Jam. On April 6, 2013, Acy scored a season-high 13 points in the Raptors' 100–83 loss to the Milwaukee Bucks.

=== Sacramento Kings (2013–2014) ===
On December 9, 2013, Acy was traded, along Rudy Gay and Aaron Gray, to the Sacramento Kings in exchange for Greivis Vásquez, Patrick Patterson, John Salmons and Chuck Hayes. Six days later, he made his debut for the Kings in a 106–91 win over the Houston Rockets, recording four points, three rebounds and one block in 13 minutes off the bench.

=== New York Knicks (2014–2015) ===
On August 6, 2014, Acy was traded, along with Travis Outlaw, to the New York Knicks in exchange for Wayne Ellington and Jeremy Tyler. He made his debut for the Knicks in their season opener on October 29, 2014, recording six points, six rebounds, one assist and one block in 21 minutes off the bench in a 104–80 loss to the Chicago Bulls. On January 5, 2015, he recorded career highs of 19 points and 14 rebounds in a 105–83 loss to the Memphis Grizzlies. He had a career-best season in 2014–15, averaging career highs in points (5.9), rebounds (4.4), assists (1.0), minutes (18.9) and games played (68).

=== Return to Sacramento (2015–2016) ===
On July 22, 2015, Acy signed with the Sacramento Kings, returning to the franchise for a second stint. On January 7, 2016, he scored a season-high 18 points in a 118–115 win over the Los Angeles Lakers.

=== Dallas Mavericks (2016) ===
On July 20, 2016, Acy signed with his home team, the Dallas Mavericks. On November 18, 2016, he was waived by the Mavericks after appearing in six games.

=== Texas Legends (2016–2017) ===
On November 28, 2016, Acy was acquired by the Los Angeles D-Fenders of the NBA Development League and then immediately traded to the Texas Legends, the Mavericks' D-League affiliate. On December 1, 2016, he made his debut for the Legends in a 121–106 win over the Greensboro Swarm, recording 16 points, seven rebounds and two blocks in 17 minutes as a starter. In 12 games for the Legends, he averaged 17.3 points, 8.1 rebounds, 1.2 assists, 1.6 steals and 2.1 blocks in 31.9 minutes.

=== Brooklyn Nets (2017–2018) ===
On January 10, 2017, Acy signed a 10-day contract with the Brooklyn Nets. He went on to sign a second 10-day contract on January 20, and a multi-year contract on January 30. On March 3, 2017, he scored a season-high 18 points in a 112–97 loss to the Utah Jazz. On April 7, 2018, Acy had career highs with six 3-pointers and 21 points in a 124–96 win over the Chicago Bulls.

=== Phoenix Suns (2019) ===
On January 7, 2019, Acy signed a 10-day contract with the Phoenix Suns. On January 17, he signed a second 10-day contract with the Suns. On January 25, Acy recorded a season-high 10 rebounds in a blowout loss to the Denver Nuggets. Two days later, Quincy left the Phoenix Suns after his second 10-day contract expired.

=== Return to Texas (2019) ===
On February 24, 2019, the Texas Legends announced that Acy had returned to their team.

=== Shenzhen Leopards (2019) ===
On March 15, 2019, Acy agreed to a deal with the Shenzhen Leopards. On March 24, 2019, Acy was registered for the season, replacing Dwight Buycks. On March 26, 2019, after appearing in one game for Shenzhen, Acy was, in turn, replaced by Buycks.

=== Maccabi Tel Aviv (2019–2020) ===
On July 31, 2019, Acy signed with Maccabi Tel Aviv of the Israeli Premier League and the EuroLeague, signing a one-year deal with an option for another one. On November 16, 2019, Acy recorded a new career-high 22 points, shooting 9-of-12 from the field, along with six rebounds and six dunks in a 94–57 win over Maccabi Ashdod.

=== Olympiacos (2021–2022) ===
On November 3, 2021, Acy signed with Olympiacos of the Greek Basket League and the EuroLeague. In four EuroLeague games, he averaged 4.3 points, 3.1 rebounds, 4.4 PIR and 0.7 blocks in 10 minutes per game. He was let go by Olympiacos in mid-July 2022.

== Coaching career ==
In October 2022, Acy became a player development coach for the NBA G League's Texas Legends.

On April 10, 2023, Acy joined the Wichita State Shockers as an assistant coach. He departed in 2025 so that he could spend more time with his family.

On January 13, 2026, Acy announced on his Instagram page that he would be joining the Dallas Mavericks as an assistant coach.

== NBA career statistics ==
Legend
GP	Games played	GS	Games started	MPG	Minutes per game
FG%	Field goal percentage	3P%	3-point field goal percentage	FT%	Free throw percentage
RPG	Rebounds per game	APG	Assists per game	SPG	Steals per game
BPG	Blocks per game	PPG	Points per game	**Bold**	Career high

Year	Team	GP	GS	MPG	FG%	3P%	FT%	RPG	APG	SPG	BPG	PPG
2012–13	Toronto	29	0	11.8	**.560**	**.500**	.816	2.7	.4	.4	**.5**	4.0
2013–14	Toronto	7	0	8.7	.429	.400	.625	2.1	.6	**.6**	.4	2.7
2013–14	Sacramento	56	0	14.0	.472	.200	.667	3.6	.4	.3	.4	2.7
2014–15	New York	68	22	18.9	.459	.300	.784	**4.4**	**1.0**	.4	.3	5.9
2015–16	Sacramento	59	**29**	14.8	.556	.388	.735	3.2	.5	.5	.4	5.2
2016–17	Dallas	6	0	8.0	.294	.125	.667	1.3	.0	.0	.0	2.2
2016–17	Brooklyn	32	1	15.9	.425	.434	.754	3.3	.6	.4	**.5**	**6.5**
2017–18	Brooklyn	**70**	8	**19.4**	.356	.349	**.817**	3.7	.8	.5	.4	5.9
2018–19	Phoenix	10	0	12.3	.222	.133	.700	2.5	.8	.1	.4	1.7
Career		337	60	16.0	.444	.350	.759	3.5	.6	.4	.4	4.9

== Personal life ==
Acy married in 2017. He has three children with his wife.
