= 2010–11 Toronto Raptors season =

NBA professional basketball team season

- Head coach: Jay Triano
- General manager: Bryan Colangelo
- Owners: Maple Leaf Sports & Entertainment
- Arena: Air Canada Centre

Results
- Record: 22–60 (.268)
- Place: Division: 5th (Atlantic); Conference: 14th (Eastern)
- Playoff finish: Did not qualify
- Stats at Basketball Reference

Local media
- Television: NBA TV Canada; Rogers Sportsnet; Rogers Sportsnet One; TSN; TSN2
- Radio: CJCL

The 2010–11 Toronto Raptors season is the 16th season of the Toronto Raptors in the National Basketball Association (NBA). The Raptors did not have Chris Bosh for the first time since 2002-03, as he departed in free agency to the Miami Heat, teaming up with fellow NBA Superstars and 2003 draftees LeBron James and Dwyane Wade, and beginning the Heat's Big 3 era. Bosh's departure caused the Raptors to start rebuilding and began the DeMar DeRozan era, which would last for the next 8 years. They finished with a 22–60 record missing the playoffs for a third consecutive year.

== Roster ==
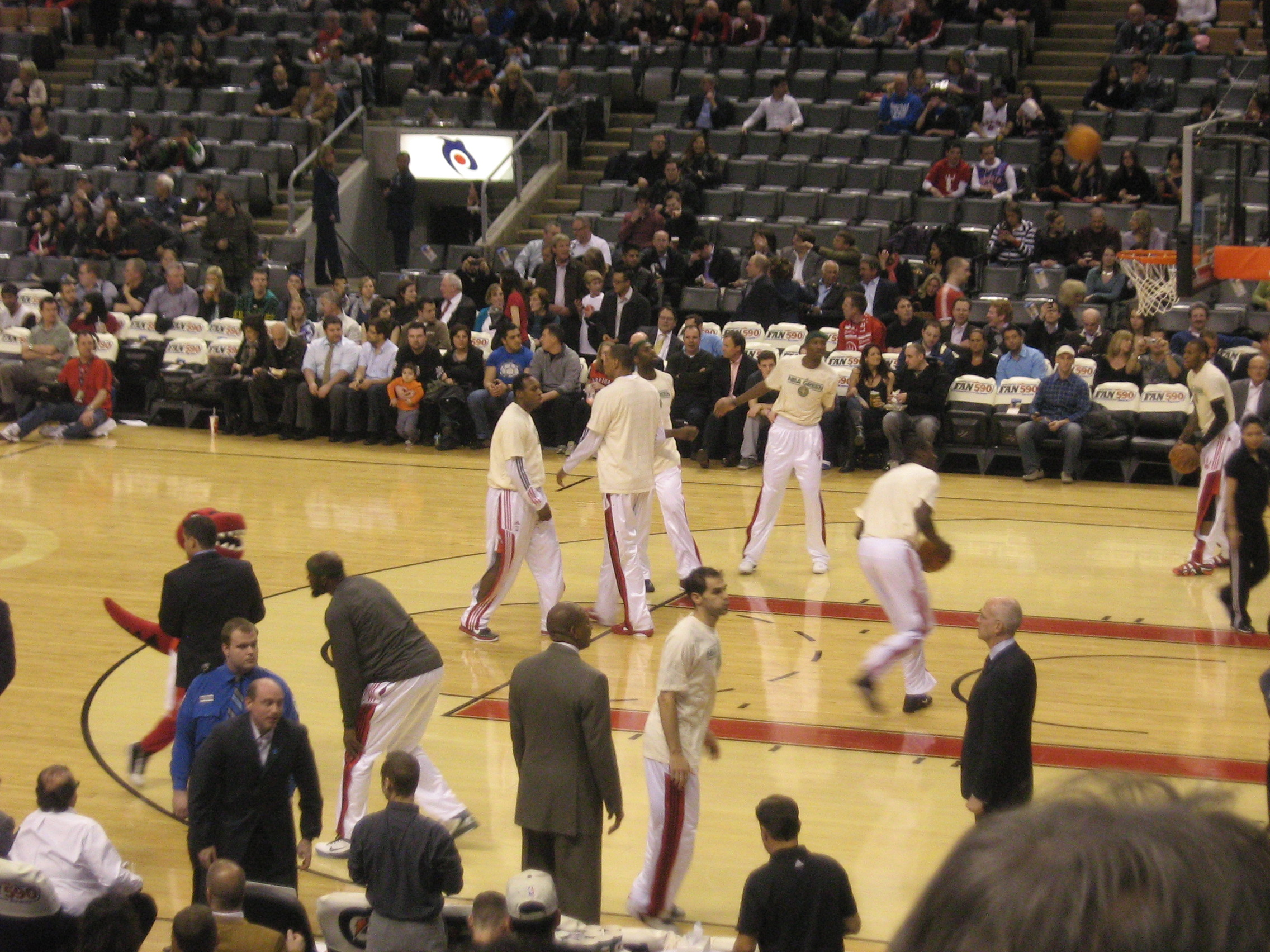
The 2010–11 Raptors warming up prior to a home game against the Cleveland Cavaliers at the Air Canada Centre

2010–11 Toronto Raptors roster
Players

Pos.	No.	Player	Height	Weight	DOB	From
C	42	Alexis Ajinça	7 ft 2 in (2.18 m)	248 lb (112 kg)	1988-05-06	France
C	50	Solomon Alabi	7 ft 1 in (2.16 m)	251 lb (114 kg)	1988-03-21	Florida State
G	20	Leandro Barbosa	6 ft 3 in (1.91 m)	194 lb (88 kg)	1982-11-28	Brazil
F/C	7	Andrea Bargnani	7 ft 0 in (2.13 m)	250 lb (113 kg)	1985-10-26	Italy
G	5	Jerryd Bayless	6 ft 3 in (1.91 m)	200 lb (91 kg)	1988-08-20	Arizona
G	8	José Calderón	6 ft 3 in (1.91 m)	200 lb (91 kg)	1981-09-28	Spain
F/C	32	Ed Davis	6 ft 10 in (2.08 m)	240 lb (109 kg)	1989-06-05	North Carolina
G/F	10	DeMar DeRozan	6 ft 7 in (2.01 m)	220 lb (100 kg)	1989-08-07	USC
F/C	9	Joey Dorsey	6 ft 8 in (2.03 m)	268 lb (122 kg)	1983-12-16	Memphis
F	30	Reggie Evans	6 ft 8 in (2.03 m)	245 lb (111 kg)	1980-05-18	Iowa
F	15	Amir Johnson	6 ft 10 in (2.08 m)	228 lb (103 kg)	1987-05-01	Westchester HS (CA)
F	0	James Johnson	6 ft 9 in (2.06 m)	250 lb (113 kg)	1987-02-20	Wake Forest
F	11	Linas Kleiza	6 ft 8 in (2.03 m)	245 lb (111 kg)	1985-01-03	Missouri
G	24	Sonny Weems	6 ft 6 in (1.98 m)	203 lb (92 kg)	1986-07-08	Arkansas
F	14	Julian Wright	6 ft 8 in (2.03 m)	225 lb (102 kg)	1987-05-20	Kansas

Coaches
Head coach
- Jay Triano
Assistant(s)
- Alex English
- Eric Hughes
- Micah Nori
- Alvin Williams

Legend
- (DP) Unsigned draft pick
- (FA) Free agent
- (S) Suspended
- Injured

=== Pre-season ===
Before the 2010–11 season began, there was much anticipation around the league over the fates of an elite pack of free agents, featuring the likes of Raptors franchise player Chris Bosh, Dwyane Wade, LeBron James, and Amar'e Stoudemire. Bosh and James eventually chose to converge in Miami with Wade, and the sign and trade transaction that ensued resulted in the Raptors receiving two first-round draft picks and a trade exception from Miami. Prior to this, Toronto had drafted Ed Davis, also a left-handed power forward like Bosh, acquired Solomon Alabi from the Dallas Mavericks, and picked up Joey Dorsey. Amir Johnson was signed to a new deal, and Linas Kleiza was made an offer sheet that Denver later refused to match. After Bosh left, General Manager Bryan Colangelo sought to trade Reggie Evans, José Calderón—the last remaining Raptor from the pre-Colangelo days—and the disenchanted Hedo Türkoğlu to the Charlotte Bobcats for Tyson Chandler, Boris Diaw, Leandro Barbosa and Dwayne Jones. Barbosa was drafted by Colangelo when the latter was still with the Phoenix Suns, and Diaw played there during Colangelo's tenure too. However, the trade involving Chandler/Diaw/Evans/Calderón fell apart at the last minute when Chandler was traded to Dallas instead. A sign-and-trade involving Orlando's Matt Barnes was also in the works, but ran into last-minute difficulties as well. In the coaching department, P. J. Carlesimo joined the team of assistant coaches, while Marc Iavaroni left for the Los Angeles Clippers.

=== Game log ===
2010 pre-season game log
Pre-season: 4–4 (home: 3–2; road: 1–2)

Game	Date	Team	Score	High points	High rebounds	High assists	Location Attendance	Record
1	October 6	@ Phoenix	W 129–78	Linas Kleiza (20)	Joey Dorsey (10)	Jarrett Jack (7)	Rogers Arena; 18,123	1–0
2	October 10	@ Boston	L 87–91	Jarrett Jack (18)	Reggie Evans, Jarrett Jack, Linas Kleiza (6)	José Calderón (6)	TD Garden; 18,624	1–1
3	October 12	@ Chicago	L 90–109	Leandro Barbosa (20)	Reggie Evans (5)	José Calderón (7)	United Center; 20,165	1–2
4	October 13	Philadelphia	W 119–116 (2OT)	Jarrett Jack (24)	Amir Johnson (9)	José Calderón (8)	Air Canada Centre; 12,078	2–2
5	October 15	Boston	L 112–117	Linas Kleiza, Andrea Bargnani (15)	Reggie Evans (8)	Sonny Weems (4)	Air Canada Centre; 13,763	2–3
6	October 17	Phoenix	W 121–100	Linas Kleiza (23)	Reggie Evans (12)	José Calderón (6)	Air Canada Centre; 12,902	3–3
7	October 20	Chicago	L 103–110	Leandro Barbosa (22)	Reggie Evans (16)	Jarrett Jack (6)	Air Canada Centre; 12,681	3–4
8	October 22	New York	W 108–103	Andrea Bargnani (15)	Reggie Evans (11)	José Calderón (6)	Bell Centre; 22,114	4–4

2010–11 season schedule

== Regular season ==
13 games into the season, the Raptors traded Jarrett Jack, David Andersen, and Marcus Banks to the New Orleans Hornets for Peja Stojaković and Jerryd Bayless. On 24 November, in a game against Boston Celtics, Reggie Evans—then Toronto's leading and the league's third-leading rebounder—was injured and ruled out for eight weeks. Toronto's leading scorer, Andrea Bargnani, had a spell on the sidelines due to injury not long after. Leading up to the All-Star break, Toronto went on a 13-game losing streak. The Raptors concluded the regular season with just 22 wins, and did not qualify for the 2011 NBA Playoffs.

=== Standings ===
Atlantic Division	W	L	PCT	GB	Home	Road	Div
y-Boston Celtics	56	26	.683	–	33–8	23–18	13–3
x-New York Knicks	42	40	.512	14	23–18	19–22	10–6
x-Philadelphia 76ers	41	41	.500	15	26–15	15–26	9–7
New Jersey Nets	24	58	.293	32	19–22	5–36	3–13
Toronto Raptors	22	60	.268	34	16–25	6–35	5–11

#	Eastern Conference				
#	Team	W	L	PCT	GB
1	z-Chicago Bulls	62	20	.756	–
2	y-Miami Heat	58	24	.707	4
3	y-Boston Celtics	56	26	.683	6
4	x-Orlando Magic	52	30	.634	10
5	x-Atlanta Hawks	44	38	.537	18
6	x-New York Knicks	42	40	.512	20
7	x-Philadelphia 76ers	41	41	.500	21
8	x-Indiana Pacers	37	45	.451	25
9	Milwaukee Bucks	35	47	.427	27
10	Charlotte Bobcats	34	48	.415	28
11	Detroit Pistons	30	52	.366	32
12	New Jersey Nets	24	58	.293	38
13	Washington Wizards	23	59	.280	39
14	Toronto Raptors	22	60	.268	40
15	Cleveland Cavaliers	19	63	.232	43

=== Game log ===
2010–11 game log
Total: 22–60 (Home: 16–25; Road: 6–35)
October: 1–1 (home: 1–1; road: 0–0)

Game	Date	Team	Score	High points	High rebounds	High assists	Location Attendance	Record
1	October 27	New York	L 93–98	Andrea Bargnani (22)	Reggie Evans (16)	José Calderón (7)	Air Canada Centre; 18,722	0–1
2	October 29	Cleveland	W 101–81	Andrea Bargnani (20)	Reggie Evans (14)	José Calderón (7)	Air Canada Centre; 15,711	1–1

November: 5–10 (home: 3–3; road: 2–7)

Game	Date	Team	Score	High points	High rebounds	High assists	Location Attendance	Record
3	November 1	@ Sacramento	L 108–111	Andrea Bargnani (28)	Reggie Evans (19)	José Calderón, Jarrett Jack (5)	ARCO Arena; 17,317	1–2
4	November 3	@ Utah	L 108–125	Andrea Bargnani (26)	Andrea Bargnani (9)	Jarrett Jack (4)	EnergySolutions Arena; 17,802	1–3
5	November 5	@ L.A. Lakers	L 103–108	Leandro Barbosa (17)	Amir Johnson (15)	José Calderón (8)	Staples Center; 18,997	1–4
6	November 6	@ Portland	L 84–97	Jarrett Jack (16)	Reggie Evans (9)	José Calderón (4)	Rose Garden Arena; 20,363	1–5
7	November 8	Golden State	L 102–109	Jarrett Jack (24)	Linas Kleiza (7)	Jarrett Jack (8)	Air Canada Centre; 14,127	1–6
8	November 10	Charlotte	L 96–101	Andrea Bargnani (23)	Reggie Evans (10)	José Calderón (9)	Air Canada Centre; 14,309	1–7
9	November 12	@ Orlando	W 110–106	Andrea Bargnani (27)	Reggie Evans (12)	José Calderón (7)	Amway Center; 18,846	2–7
10	November 13	@ Miami	L 100–109	Andrea Bargnani (22)	Joey Dorsey (11)	Sonny Weems (5)	American Airlines Arena; 19,600	2–8
11	November 16	@ Washington	L 94–109	Sonny Weems (16)	Reggie Evans (9)	Jarrett Jack (5)	Verizon Center; 11,513	2–9
12	November 17	@ Philadelphia	W 94–86	Andrea Bargnani (30)	Reggie Evans (14)	José Calderón (8)	Wells Fargo Center; 12,164	3–9
13	November 19	Houston	W 106–96	Andrea Bargnani (26)	Reggie Evans (9)	Jarrett Jack (8)	Air Canada Centre; 17,369	4–9
14	November 21	Boston	W 102–101	Andrea Bargnani (29)	Reggie Evans (16)	Leandro Barbosa (5)	Air Canada Centre; 17,707	5–9
15	November 24	Philadelphia	W 106–90	Andrea Bargnani (24)	Reggie Evans (22)	José Calderón (9)	Air Canada Centre; 15,012	6–9
16	November 26	@ Boston	L 101–110	Linas Kleiza (18)	Andrea Bargnani (8)	José Calderón (15)	TD Garden; 18,624	6–10
17	November 28	Atlanta	L 78–96	Andrea Bargnani (14)	Andrea Bargnani (7)	José Calderón (5)	Air Canada Centre; 17,302	6–11

December: 5–10 (home: 3–5; road: 2–5)

Game	Date	Team	Score	High points	High rebounds	High assists	Location Attendance	Record
18	December 1	Washington	W 127–108	DeMar DeRozan (20)	Andrea Bargnani, Joey Dorsey (8)	José Calderón (8)	Air Canada Centre; 15,209	7–11
19	December 3	Oklahoma City	W 111–99	Andrea Bargnani (26)	Andrea Bargnani (12)	José Calderón (15)	Air Canada Centre; 16,774	8–11
20	December 5	New York	L 99–116	Jerryd Bayless (23)	Amir Johnson (16)	Jerryd Bayless, José Calderón (6)	Air Canada Centre; 16,891	8–12
21	December 6	@ Indiana	L 100–124	José Calderón (21)	Amir Johnson (9)	José Calderón (4)	Conseco Fieldhouse; 11,930	8–13
22	December 8	@ New York	L 110–113	Andrea Bargnani (41)	Andrea Bargnani, Linas Kleiza (7)	José Calderón (7)	Madison Square Garden; 19,763	8–14
23	December 10	Denver	L 116–123	Linas Kleiza (26)	Linas Kleiza (12)	Jerryd Bayless (5)	Air Canada Centre; 14,715	8–15
24	December 11	@ Detroit	W 120–116	Jerryd Bayless (31)	Andrea Bargnani, Jerryd Bayless, Ed Davis, Amir Johnson (5)	Jerryd Bayless, Leandro Barbosa (7)	The Palace of Auburn Hills; 13,343	9–15
25	December 14	@ Charlotte	L 91–97	Jerryd Bayless (17)	Amir Johnson (12)	Jerryd Bayless (9)	Time Warner Cable Arena; 12,482	9–16
26	December 15	Chicago	L 93–110	Jerryd Bayless (20)	Joey Dorsey (13)	Sonny Weems (5)	Air Canada Centre; 17,750	9–17
27	December 17	New Jersey	W 98–92	Andrea Bargnani (32)	Linas Kleiza (12)	José Calderón (14)	Air Canada Centre; 14,623	10–17
28	December 19	L.A. Lakers	L 110–120	Linas Kleiza (26)	Linas Kleiza (10)	José Calderón (12)	Air Canada Centre; 19,935	10–18
29	December 22	Detroit	L 93–115	Leandro Barbosa (21)	Julian Wright (6)	José Calderón (13)	Air Canada Centre; 15,303	10–19
30	December 27	@ Memphis	L 85–96	Linas Kleiza (22)	Joey Dorsey (13)	José Calderón (9)	FedExForum; 14,971	10–20
31	December 28	@ Dallas	W 84–76	Ed Davis (17)	Ed Davis (12)	Jerryd Bayless (8)	American Airlines Center; 20,027	11–20
32	December 31	@ Houston	L 105–114	DeMar DeRozan (37)	Linas Kleiza (12)	José Calderón (11)	Toyota Center; 18,121	11–21

January: 2–15 (home: 1–6; road: 1–9)

Game	Date	Team	Score	High points	High rebounds	High assists	Location Attendance	Record
33	January 2	Boston	L 79–93	DeMar DeRozan (27)	Joey Dorsey (13)	José Calderón (10)	Air Canada Centre; 19,986	11–22
34	January 4	@ Chicago	L 91–111	Andrea Bargnani (23)	Andrea Bargnani (6)	Jerryd Bayless (8)	United Center; 21,290	11–23
35	January 5	@ Cleveland	W 120–105	Andrea Bargnani (25)	Julian Wright (9)	José Calderón (17)	Quicken Loans Arena; 20,562	12–23
36	January 7	@ Boston	L 102–122	DeMar DeRozan (20)	Joey Dorsey, Linas Kleiza (6)	José Calderón (9)	TD Garden; 18,624	12–24
37	January 9	Sacramento	W 118–112	Andrea Bargnani (30)	Amir Johnson (9)	José Calderón (9)	Air Canada Centre; 17,206	13–24
38	January 12	Atlanta	L 101–104	Leandro Barbosa, Andrea Bargnani (26)	Amir Johnson (7)	José Calderón (9)	Air Canada Centre; 14,186	13–25
39	January 14	Detroit	L 95–101	Andrea Bargnani (31)	Amir Johnson (10)	José Calderón (13)	Air Canada Centre; 16,924	13–26
40	January 15	@ Washington	L 95–98	Andrea Bargnani (25)	Amir Johnson (10)	José Calderón (15)	Verizon Center; 14,652	13–27
41	January 17	@ New Orleans	L 81–85	DeMar DeRozan (23)	Ed Davis (12)	José Calderón (13)	New Orleans Arena; 15,155	13–28
42	January 19	@ San Antonio	L 95–104	DeMar DeRozan (28)	Ed Davis (11)	José Calderón (8)	AT&T Center; 18,581	13–29
43	January 21	@ Orlando	L 72–112	DeMar DeRozan (16)	Julian Wright (10)	José Calderón (5)	Amway Center; 19,047	13–30
44	January 22	@ Miami	L 103–120	DeMar DeRozan (30)	Ed Davis (10)	José Calderón (13)	American Airlines Arena; 20,025	13–31
45	January 24	Memphis	L 98–100	Andrea Bargnani (29)	DeMar DeRozan, Julian Wright (9)	Jerryd Bayless (11)	Air Canada Centre; 14,127	13–32
46	January 26	Philadelphia	L 94–107	DeMar DeRozan (29)	Amir Johnson (6)	José Calderón (13)	Air Canada Centre; 14,552	13–33
47	January 28	Milwaukee	L 110–116 (OT)	Amir Johnson (24)	Amir Johnson (12)	José Calderón (10)	Air Canada Centre; 15,159	13–34
48	January 29	@ Minnesota	L 87–103	Andrea Bargnani, Ed Davis (15)	Ed Davis (11)	José Calderón, Trey Johnson (6)	Target Center; 14,991	13–35
49	January 31	@ Indiana	L 93–104	Amir Johnson (18)	Amir Johnson (8)	José Calderón (7)	Conseco Fieldhouse; 10,258	13–36

February: 3–8 (home: 3–5; road: 0–3)

Game	Date	Team	Score	High points	High rebounds	High assists	Location Attendance	Record
50	February 2	@ Atlanta	L 87–100	Amir Johnson (20)	Amir Johnson (14)	José Calderón (10)	Philips Arena; 14,025	13–37
51	February 4	Minnesota	W 111–100	Andrea Bargnani (30)	Amir Johnson (12)	José Calderón (19)	Air Canada Centre; 14,389	14–37
52	February 8	@ Milwaukee	L 74–92	Andrea Bargnani (23)	Amir Johnson (11)	José Calderón (7)	Bradley Center; 11,975	14–38
53	February 9	San Antonio	L 100–111	Andrea Bargnani (29)	Amir Johnson (13)	José Calderón (11)	Air Canada Centre; 15,867	14–39
54	February 11	Portland	L 96–102	Andrea Bargnani (29)	Ed Davis (13)	José Calderón (10)	Air Canada Centre; 15,625	14–40
55	February 13	L.A. Clippers	W 98–93	Andrea Bargnani (27)	Ed Davis (14)	José Calderón (11)	Air Canada Centre; 19,800	15–40
56	February 16	Miami	L 95–103	Andrea Bargnani (38)	Ed Davis (13)	José Calderón (14)	Air Canada Centre; 20,156	15–41
All-Star Break
57	February 22	@ Charlotte	L 101–114	Sonny Weems (19)	Andrea Bargnani (8)	José Calderón (11)	Time Warner Cable Arena; 12,976	15–42
58	February 23	Chicago	W 118–113	Andrea Bargnani, DeMar DeRozan (24)	Andrea Bargnani (8)	José Calderón (17)	Air Canada Centre; 18,105	16–42
59	February 25	Phoenix	L 92–110	Andrea Bargnani (26)	Jerryd Bayless, Ed Davis (5)	José Calderón (7)	Air Canada Centre; 19,004	16–43
60	February 27	Dallas	L 96–114	Amir Johnson (21)	José Calderón (8)	José Calderón (8)	Air Canada Centre; 16,827	16–44

March: 4–10 (home: 3–3; road: 1–7)

Game	Date	Team	Score	High points	High rebounds	High assists	Location Attendance	Record
61	March 1	New Orleans	W 96–90	José Calderón (22)	Amir Johnson (10)	José Calderón (16)	Air Canada Centre; 14,704	17–44
62	March 4	@ New Jersey	L 103–116	DeMar DeRozan (30)	Ed Davis (8)	José Calderón (12)	O2 Arena; 18,689	17–45
63	March 5	@ New Jersey	L 136–137 (3OT)	Andrea Bargnani (35)	Ed Davis (15)	José Calderón (9)	O2 Arena; 18,689	17–46
64	March 9	Utah	L 94–96	DeMar DeRozan (17)	Reggie Evans (11)	José Calderón (6)	Air Canada Centre; 14,425	17–47
65	March 11	Indiana	W 108–98	Leandro Barbosa (29)	Reggie Evans (16)	José Calderón (8)	Air Canada Centre; 14,726	18–47
66	March 13	Charlotte	L 90–95	Andrea Bargnani (17)	Reggie Evans (17)	José Calderón (7)	Air Canada Centre; 16,557	18–48
67	March 16	@ Detroit	L 93–107	Andrea Bargnani (20)	Reggie Evans (8)	José Calderón (6)	The Palace of Auburn Hills; 15,166	18–49
68	March 18	Washington	W 116–107	Andrea Bargnani (33)	Reggie Evans (15)	José Calderón (6)	Air Canada Centre; 18,017	19–49
69	March 20	@ Oklahoma City	W 95–93	Andrea Bargnani (23)	Reggie Evans (9)	José Calderón (9)	Oklahoma City Arena; 18,203	20–49
70	March 21	@ Denver	L 90–123	Andrea Bargnani (20)	Alexis Ajinça, Reggie Evans (9)	Jerryd Bayless (9)	Pepsi Center; 16,258	20–50
71	March 23	@ Phoenix	L 106–114	Andrea Bargnani (27)	Ed Davis (9)	José Calderón (13)	US Airways Center; 17,865	20–51
72	March 25	@ Golden State	L 100–138	Leandro Barbosa, DeMar DeRozan (19)	Ed Davis (11)	Andrea Bargnani, José Calderón, Sonny Weems (5)	Oracle Arena; 17,504	20–52
73	March 26	@ L.A. Clippers	L 90–94	Ed Davis (21)	Ed Davis (11)	Leandro Barbosa (6)	Staples Center; 19,060	20–53
74	March 30	Milwaukee	L 98–104	Andrea Bargnani (22)	James Johnson (10)	José Calderón (8)	Air Canada Centre; 15,906	20–54

April: 2–6 (home: 2–2; road: 0–4)

Game	Date	Team	Score	High points	High rebounds	High assists	Location Attendance	Record
75	April 2	@ Chicago	L 106–113	Jerryd Bayless, DeMar DeRozan (26)	Ed Davis (11)	Jerryd Bayless (8)	United Center; 22,228	20–55
76	April 3	Orlando	W 102–98	DeMar DeRozan (24)	Reggie Evans (17)	Jerryd Bayless (8)	Air Canada Centre; 19,800	21–55
77	April 5	@ New York	L 118–131	DeMar DeRozan (36)	Ed Davis (13)	Jerryd Bayless (5)	Madison Square Garden; 19,763	21–56
78	April 6	Cleveland	L 96–104	Jerryd Bayless (28)	Reggie Evans (13)	José Calderón (9)	Air Canada Centre; 14,886	21–57
79	April 8	@ Philadelphia	L 93–98	DeMar DeRozan (27)	Reggie Evans (15)	Jerryd Bayless (8)	Wells Fargo Center; 16,362	21–58
80	April 10	New Jersey	W 99–92	Jerryd Bayless (19)	Reggie Evans (15)	James Johnson (6)	Air Canada Centre; 17,755	22–58
81	April 11	@ Milwaukee	L 86–93	Jerryd Bayless (20)	Joey Dorsey (20)	Jerryd Bayless (5)	Bradley Center; 13,279	22–59
82	April 13	Miami	L 79–97	Jerryd Bayless (21)	Ed Davis (8)	James Johnson (6)	Air Canada Centre; 20,108	22–60

2010–11 season schedule

== Player statistics ==
=== Regular season ===
Player	POS	GP	GS	MP	REB	AST	STL	BLK	PTS	MPG	RPG	APG	SPG	BPG	PPG
DeMar DeRozan	SG	82	82	2,851	315	148	85	31	1,410	34.8	3.8	1.8	1.0	.4	17.2
Amir Johnson	PF	72	54	1,853	461	81	53	88	688	25.7	6.4	1.1	.7	1.2	9.6
José Calderón	PG	68	55	2,102	202	605	81	7	669	30.9	3.0	8.9	1.2	.1	9.8
Andrea Bargnani	C	66	66	2,353	343	119	34	46	1,414	35.7	5.2	1.8	.5	.7	21.4
Ed Davis	PF	65	17	1,602	462	40	39	67	501	24.6	7.1	.6	.6	1.0	7.7
Jerryd Bayless^{†}	PG	60	14	1,347	150	238	36	4	601	22.5	2.5	4.0	.6	.1	10.0
Sonny Weems	SF	59	28	1,413	153	104	34	2	545	23.9	2.6	1.8	.6	.0	9.2
Leandro Barbosa	SG	58	0	1,395	99	119	50	6	769	24.1	1.7	2.1	.9	.1	13.3
Julian Wright	SF	52	6	766	118	58	39	20	188	14.7	2.3	1.1	.8	.4	3.6
Joey Dorsey	C	43	9	522	190	27	24	17	135	12.1	4.4	.6	.6	.4	3.1
Linas Kleiza	SF	39	23	1,032	177	40	19	7	436	26.5	4.5	1.0	.5	.2	11.2
Reggie Evans	PF	30	18	798	345	38	29	6	132	26.6	11.5	1.3	1.0	.2	4.4
James Johnson^{†}	SF	25	25	699	118	75	25	28	229	28.0	4.7	3.0	1.0	1.1	9.2
Alexis Ajinça^{†}	C	24	0	265	61	8	8	14	114	11.0	2.5	.3	.3	.6	4.8
Jarrett Jack^{†}	PG	13	13	347	42	59	14	0	140	26.7	3.2	4.5	1.1	.0	10.8
Solomon Alabi	C	12	0	59	14	2	2	2	6	4.9	1.2	.2	.2	.2	.5
David Andersen^{†}	PF	11	0	150	34	7	3	3	56	13.6	3.1	.6	.3	.3	5.1
Trey Johnson^{†}	SG	7	0	81	7	11	1	1	28	11.6	1.0	1.6	.1	.1	4.0
Sundiata Gaines^{†}	PG	6	0	90	8	11	4	1	35	15.0	1.3	1.8	.7	.2	5.8
Marcus Banks	PG	3	0	22	1	3	1	0	6	7.3	.3	1.0	.3	.0	2.0
Ronald Dupree	SF	3	0	13	3	1	0	0	2	4.3	1.0	.3	.0	.0	.7
Peja Stojaković^{†}	SF	2	0	22	3	1	0	0	20	11.0	1.5	.5	.0	.0	10.0

- ^{†} Denotes player spent time with another team in the season. Stats reflect time with the Raptors only.

== Transactions ==
=== Trades ===
24 June 2010
To Dallas Mavericks----
- Future second-round pick
  Cash considerations
To Toronto Raptors----
- No. 50 pick (Solomon Alabi)
9 July 2010
To Toronto Raptors----
- Two first-round picks in 2011
  Trade exception
To Miami Heat----
- (United States) Chris Bosh (sign and trade)
14 July 2010
To Phoenix Suns----
- (Turkey) Hedo Türkoğlu
To Toronto Raptors----
- (Brazil) Leandro Barbosa
  (United States) Dwayne Jones
28 July 2010
To Houston Rockets----
- second-round pick in 2015
To Toronto Raptors----
- (Australia) David Andersen
11 August 2010
To New Orleans Hornets----
- (Italy) Marco Belinelli
To Toronto Raptors----
- (United States) Julian Wright
20 November 2010
To New Orleans Hornets----
- (Australia) David Andersen
  (United States) Marcus Banks
  (United States) Jarrett Jack
To Toronto Raptors----
- (United States) Jerryd Bayless
  (Serbia) Peja Stojaković
  Cash Considerations
24 January 2011
To Dallas Mavericks----
- rights to (Greece) Georgios Printezis
To Toronto Raptors----
- (France) Alexis Ajinça
  Future second-round pick
  cash considerations
22 February 2011
To Chicago Bulls----
- first-round pick in 2011 (from Miami Heat)
To Toronto Raptors----
- (United States) James Johnson

|

=== Free agents ===
==== Additions ====
Player	Signed	Former team
Amir Johnson	Signed 5-year contract for $34 million	Toronto Raptors
Linas Kleiza	Signed 4-year contract for $20 million	(Greece) Olympiacos

==== Subtractions ====
Player	Reason left	New team
Chris Bosh	Free agent	Miami Heat
Antoine Wright	Free agent	Sacramento Kings
