= Ed Davis (basketball) =

American basketball player (born 1989)

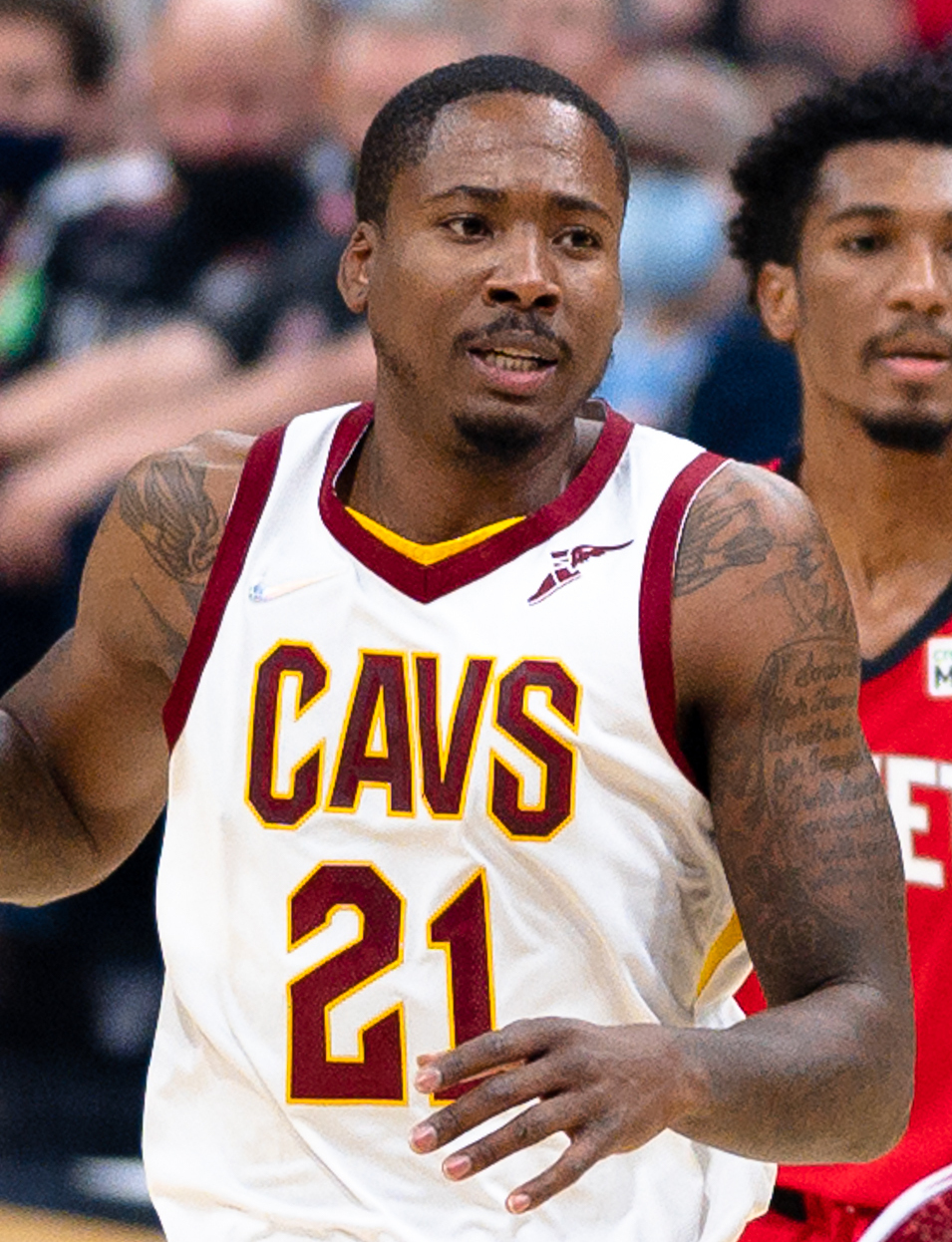
- Davis with the Cleveland Cavaliers in 2021

Personal information
- Born: June 5, 1989 (age 37) Washington, D.C., U.S.
- Listed height: 6 ft 9 in (2.06 m)
- Listed weight: 218 lb (99 kg)

Career information
- High school: Hanover (Mechanicsville, Virginia); Benedictine (Richmond, Virginia)
- College: North Carolina (2008–2010)
- NBA draft: 2010: 1st round, 13th overall pick
- Drafted by: Toronto Raptors
- Playing career: 2010–2024
- Position: Center / power forward
- Number: 32, 21, 17

Career history
- 2010–2013: Toronto Raptors
- 2010: →Erie BayHawks
- 2013–2014: Memphis Grizzlies
- 2014–2015: Los Angeles Lakers
- 2015–2018: Portland Trail Blazers
- 2018–2019: Brooklyn Nets
- 2019–2020: Utah Jazz
- 2020–2021: Minnesota Timberwolves
- 2021–2022: Cleveland Cavaliers
- 2023: Mets de Guaynabo
- 2023: Xinjiang Flying Tigers
- 2024: Cangrejeros de Santurce

Career highlights
- NCAA champion (2009); ACC All-Freshman Team (2009); McDonald's All-American (2008); Second-team Parade All-American (2008); Virginia Mr. Basketball (2008)
- Stats at NBA.com
- Stats at Basketball Reference

Edward Adam Davis (born June 5, 1989) is an American former professional basketball player. He played 12 seasons in the National Basketball Association (NBA). He played high school basketball at Benedictine High School in Richmond, Virginia. He is the son of former NBA player Terry Davis. He was selected with the 13th overall pick in the 2010 NBA draft by the Toronto Raptors.

== High school career ==
Davis spent his first two years of high school playing basketball at Hanover High School in Mechanicsville, Virginia before transferring to Benedictine High School in Richmond, Virginia. There, he led Benedictine to two state championships while averaging 22 points, 14 rebounds and 7 blocks as a senior. He accompanied future Tar Heel teammates Tyler Zeller and Larry Drew II in the McDonald's All-American Game and was selected to the Jordan Brand All-American Team. He was named Mr. Basketball of Virginia in 2008, which is given to Virginia's best high school basketball player. He also received recognition as the co-player of the year in 2007.

Considered a five-star recruit by Rivals.com, Davis was listed as the No. 4 power forward and the No. 15 player in the nation in 2008.

== College career ==
Davis played in every game during the 2008–09 season, while starting in two of them. He averaged 6.7 points, 7.0 rebounds, and 18.8 minutes per game in his first season with the Tar Heels. Davis also led the team with 65 blocks with an average of 1.7 per game. In North Carolina's six wins during the 2009 NCAA tournament, Davis averaged 8.2 points and 5.5 rebounds. In the 2009 NCAA championship game, Davis came off the bench to score 11 points and grab a team-high 8 rebounds, helping the Tar Heels to an 89–72 win over Michigan State. Davis was also named to the 2009 All-Freshman Team and was co-recipient of the team's Most Improved Player award.

In April 2009, Davis announced he would return to North Carolina after his freshman year instead of declaring for the NBA draft. In February 2010, he suffered a broken wrist in a loss to Duke, which effectively ended his season. In 2009–10, he played 23 games, averaging 13.4 points, 9.6 rebounds, 1.0 assists and 2.8 blocks per game. Davis was seen as a projected top three pick in the 2009 NBA draft had he declared .

In April 2010, Davis declared for the NBA draft, foregoing his final two years of college eligibility. He signed with sports agent Rob Pelinka.

== Professional career ==
=== Toronto Raptors (2010–2013) ===
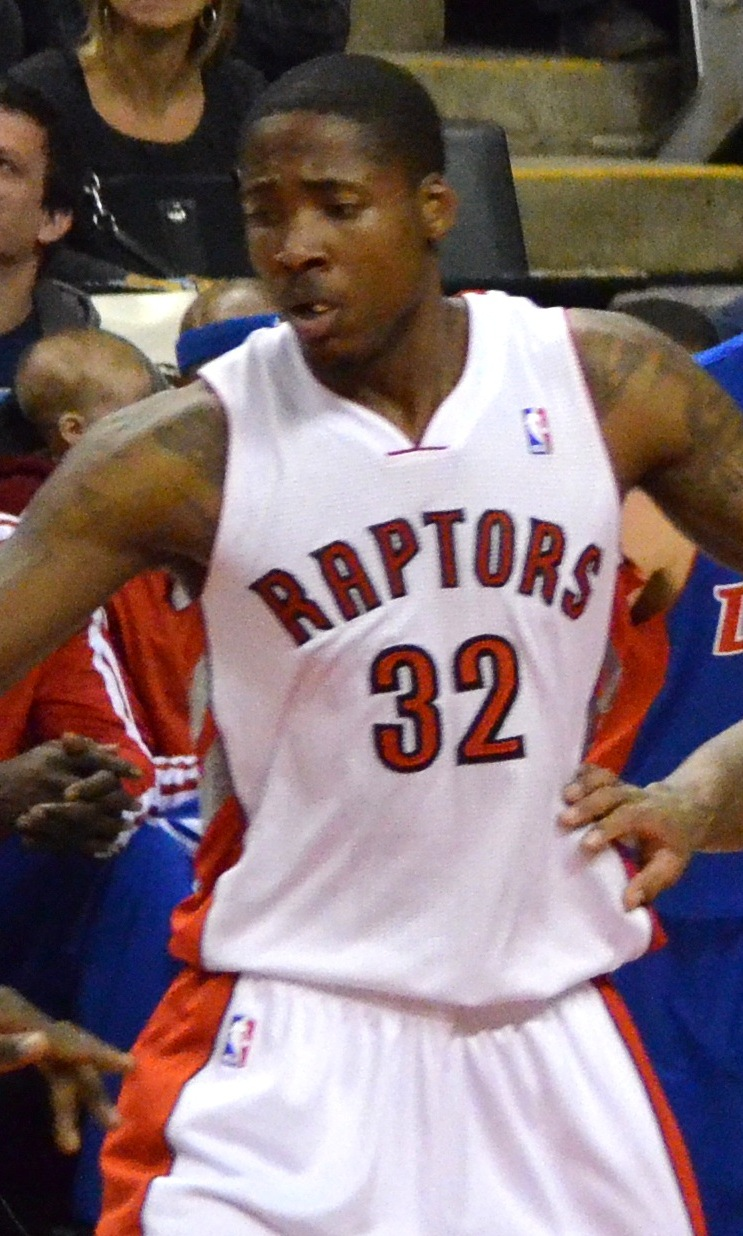
Davis with the Toronto Raptors in 2012

Davis in the 2009 NBA draft was seen as a projected top three pick . Davis was selected by the Toronto Raptors with the 13th overall pick in the 2010 NBA draft. On July 6, 2010, he signed with the Raptors. After a month with the Raptors, Davis was assigned to the Erie BayHawks. On November 29, 2010, Davis was recalled by the Raptors. On December 1, 2010, he made his NBA debut against the Washington Wizards, recording 11 points, 6 rebounds, and 2 blocks. On April 5, 2011, Davis recorded a career-high 22 points against the New York Knicks.

=== Memphis Grizzlies (2013–2014) ===
On January 30, 2013, Davis was traded to the Memphis Grizzlies, along with Tayshaun Prince and Austin Daye of the Detroit Pistons, in a three team deal that also sent teammate José Calderón to the Pistons, and Rudy Gay and Hamed Haddadi of the Grizzlies to the Raptors.

On June 30, 2014, the Grizzlies declined the opportunity to tender a qualifying offer to Davis, making him an unrestricted free agent.

=== Los Angeles Lakers (2014–2015) ===
On July 23, 2014, Davis signed a one year contract with the Los Angeles Lakers. He played 79 games during the season averaging 8.3 points, 7.6 rebounds, and 1.2 rebounds with a season high points of 20.

=== Portland Trail Blazers (2015–2018) ===
On July 9, 2015, Davis signed a three-year, $20 million contract with the Portland Trail Blazers. On November 20, 2015, he recorded 17 points and 15 rebounds in a 102–91 win over the Los Angeles Clippers. His 15 rebounds included a career-high 10 offensive rebounds, the most for a Blazer since Greg Oden had 10 in December 2009. He also became the first Blazers player to have at least 15 points and 15 rebounds off the bench since Travis Outlaw in 2006.

On March 1, 2017, Davis was ruled out for the rest of the 2016–17 season after requiring arthroscopic surgery on his left shoulder to repair an injured labrum.

=== Brooklyn Nets (2018–2019) ===
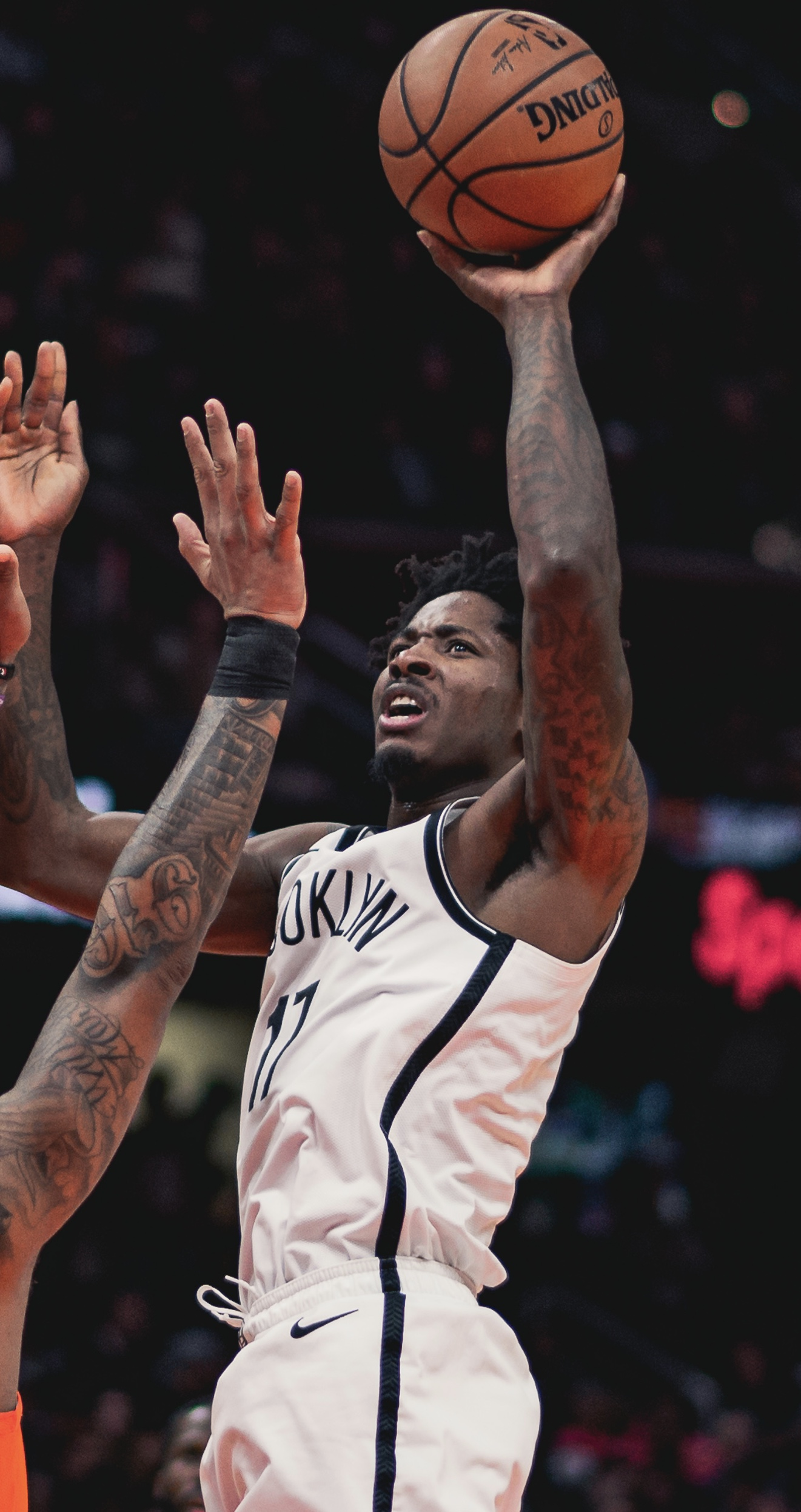
Davis takes a shot with the Brooklyn Nets in 2019

On July 23, 2018, Davis signed with the Brooklyn Nets. Davis only missed one game during the regular season, averaging 5.8 points and 8.6 rebounds. His season-high single-game point total was 17, and his rebounds were only one less with 16 .

=== Utah Jazz (2019–2020) ===
On July 20, 2019, Davis signed with the Utah Jazz. On November 2, 2019, the Utah Jazz announced that Davis had suffered a fractured left fibula vs. the Sacramento Kings and was expected to be sidelined for about four weeks.

=== Minnesota Timberwolves (2020–2021) ===
On November 23, 2020, Davis was traded to the New York Knicks, and on November 24 he was traded once again, this time to the Minnesota Timberwolves.

=== Cleveland Cavaliers (2021–2022) ===
On October 13, 2021, Davis signed with the Cleveland Cavaliers.

=== Mets de Guaynabo (2023) ===
On February 4, 2023, Davis signed with Mets de Guaynabo of the Baloncesto Superior Nacional (BSN). He was released by the team on April 10.

== Career statistics ==
Legend
GP	Games played	GS	Games started	MPG	Minutes per game
FG%	Field goal percentage	3P%	3-point field goal percentage	FT%	Free throw percentage
RPG	Rebounds per game	APG	Assists per game	SPG	Steals per game
BPG	Blocks per game	PPG	Points per game	**Bold**	Career high
*	Led the league

=== NBA ===
==== Regular season ====
Year	Team	GP	GS	MPG	FG%	3P%	FT%	RPG	APG	SPG	BPG	PPG
2010–11	Toronto	65	17	**24.6**	.576	—	.555	7.1	.6	.6	1.0	7.7
2011–12	Toronto	66*	9	23.2	.513	.000	.670	6.6	.9	.6	1.0	6.3
2012–13	Toronto	45	**24**	24.2	.549	—	.647	6.7	**1.2**	.6	.8	**9.7**
2012–13	Memphis	36	4	15.1	.517	—	.569	4.4	.2	.4	**1.3**	5.1
2013–14	Memphis	63	4	15.2	.534	—	.528	4.1	.4	.3	.7	5.7
2014–15	L.A. Lakers	79	**24**	23.3	.601	—	.487	7.6	**1.2**	.6	1.2	8.3
2015–16	Portland	**81**	0	20.8	.611	—	.559	7.4	1.1	**.7**	.9	6.5
2016–17	Portland	46	12	17.2	.528	—	.617	5.3	.6	.3	.5	4.3
2017–18	Portland	78	0	18.9	.582	.000	.667	7.4	.5	.4	.7	5.3
2018–19	Brooklyn	**81**	1	17.9	.616	.000	.617	**8.6**	.8	.4	.4	5.8
2019–20	Utah	28	1	10.8	.478	—	.500	3.8	.4	.4	.3	1.8
2020–21	Minnesota	23	7	13.0	.432	—	**.833**	5.0	.9	.6	.6	2.1
2021–22	Cleveland	31	3	6.5	**.688**	—	.429	2.1	.2	.1	.3	.9
Career		722	106	19.1	.567	.000	.583	6.4	.7	.5	.8	5.9

==== Playoffs ====
Year	Team	GP	GS	MPG	FG%	3P%	FT%	RPG	APG	SPG	BPG	PPG
2013	Memphis	8	0	6.0	.417	—	.750	1.4	.0	.0	.1	1.6
2014	Memphis	7	0	3.6	.300	—	.000	2.1	.0	.1	.4	.9
2016	Portland	**11**	0	**18.6**	.525	.000	.576	6.8	**1.3**	**.2**	**.6**	**5.5**
2018	Portland	4	0	17.8	.500	—	.250	**8.0**	.0	.0	.3	2.8
2019	Brooklyn	3	0	13.7	**.700**	—	**1.000**	6.3	.7	.0	.3	5.3
Career		33	0	11.8	.500	.000	.568	4.6	.5	.1	.4	3.2

=== College ===
Year	Team	GP	GS	MPG	FG%	3P%	FT%	RPG	APG	SPG	BPG	PPG
2008–09	North Carolina	**38**	2	18.8	.518	—	.573	6.6	.6	**.4**	1.7	6.7
2009–10	North Carolina	23	**23**	**27.9**	**.578**	—	**.659**	**9.6**	**1.0**	**.4**	**2.8**	**13.4**
Career		61	25	22.2	.548	—	.623	7.7	.7	.4	2.1	9.2

== Personal life ==
Davis is the son of Angela Jones and Terry Davis.

On June 29, 2026, Davis was indicted on sports gambling charges by federal prosecutors at the U.S. Attorney's Office for the Eastern District of New York.

== See also ==
- List of second-generation NBA players
