= Tom Sterner =

American basketball coach (born 1956)

Personal information
- Born: November 17, 1956 (age 69)
- Position: Assistant coach

Career history

Coaching
- 1987–1990: Franklin & Marshall (assistant)
- 1990–2002: Orlando Magic (assistant)
- 2002–2005: Golden State Warriors (assistant)
- 2005–2008: Orlando Magic (assistant)
- 2008–2010: Dallas Mavericks (assistant)
- 2011–2015: Toronto Raptors (assistant)

Thomas Sterner (born November 17, 1956) is an American basketball coach who was an assistant coach for the Toronto Raptors. In August 2015, Sterner joined the University of Central Florida staff as Director of Program Development.
