= EuroBasket 2007 =

International basketball event

Campeonato Europeo de Baloncesto Masculino de 2007

Tournament details
- Host country: Spain
- Dates: 3–16 September 2007
- Teams: 16
- Venues: 6 (in 5 host cities)

Final positions
- Champions: Russia (1st title)
- Runners-up: Spain
- Third place: Lithuania
- Fourth place: Greece

Tournament statistics
- Games played: 54
- MVP: (Russia) Andrei Kirilenko
- Top scorer: (Germany) Dirk Nowitzki (24.0 ppg)
- Top rebounds: (Israel) Yaniv Green (9.3 rpg)
- Top assists: (Lithuania) Šarūnas Jasikevičius (5.6 apg)
- PPG (Team): Spain (82.1 ppg)
- RPG (Team): Lithuania (39.8 rpg)
- APG (Team): Czech Republic (14.3 apg)

Official website
- www.fiba.basketball

The 2007 FIBA European Championship, commonly called FIBA EuroBasket 2007, was the 35th FIBA EuroBasket regional basketball championship held by FIBA Europe, which also served as Europe qualifier for the 2008 Summer Olympics, giving a berth to the champion and runner-up teams (or to the third-placed team in case Spain should reach the final). It was held in Spain between 3 September and 16 September 2007. Sixteen national teams entered the event under the auspices of FIBA Europe, the sport's regional governing body. The cities of Alicante, Granada, Madrid, Palma de Mallorca, and Seville hosted the tournament. Russia won its first EuroBasket title since the dissolution of the Soviet Union, by defeating hosts Spain, with a 60–59 score in the final. Russia's Andrei Kirilenko was voted the tournament's MVP.

== Venues ==
| Location | Picture | City | Arena | Capacity | Status | Round |
|---|---|---|---|---|---|---|
| EuroBasket 2007 is located in Spain | | Alicante | Centro de Tecnificación de Alicante | 5,425 | Opened in 1993 | Group D |
| EuroBasket 2007 is located in Spain | | Granada | Palacio Municipal de Deportes de Granada | 7,500 | Opened in 1991 | Group A |
| EuroBasket 2007 is located in Spain | | Madrid | Madrid Arena | 10,500 | Opened in 2002 | Second round |
| EuroBasket 2007 is located in Spain | | Madrid | Palacio de Deportes de la Comunidad de Madrid | 15,500 | Opened in 1960; Re-opened in 2005 | Knockout stages and final |
| EuroBasket 2007 is located in Spain | | Palma de Mallorca | Palma Arena | 6,000 | Opened in 2007 | Group C |
| EuroBasket 2007 is located in Spain | | Seville | Palacio Municipal de Deportes San Pablo | 10,000 | Opened in 1988 | Group B |

== Qualification ==
Map of participating countries

Of the sixteen teams that participated in EuroBasket 2005, hosts Spain plus the eight European teams that participated in the 2006 FIBA World Championship qualified directly. The other seven teams earned their berths via a qualifying tournament. The draw for the FIBA EuroBasket 2007 was held in Madrid on 19 October 2006.

| Competition | Date | Vacancies | Qualified |
|---|---|---|---|
| Host nation | – | 1 | Spain |
| Participant of 2006 FIBA World Championship | 19 August – 3 September 2006 | 8 | France; Germany; Greece; Italy; Lithuania; Serbia; Slovenia; Turkey |
| Qualified through Qualifying Round | 31 August – 16 September 2006 | 6 | Croatia; Czech Republic; Latvia; Poland; Portugal; Russia |
| Qualified through Additional Qualifying Round | 8 August – 31 August 2007 | 1 | Israel |

| Group A | Group B | Group C | Group D |
|---|---|---|---|
| Greece; Russia; Serbia; Israel | Spain; Croatia; Latvia; Portugal | Germany; Lithuania; Turkey; Czech Republic | France; Slovenia; Italy; Poland |

== Format ==
- The top three teams from each group advance to the qualifying round, in which they are separated into two groups (A1, A2, A3, B1, B2, B3 on Group E; C1, C2, C3, D1, D2, D3 on Group F).
- Results and standings among teams within the same group are carried over.
- The top four teams at the qualifying round advance to the knockout quarterfinals (E1 vs. F4, E2 vs. F3, and so on).
- The winners in the knockout semifinals advance to the Final, where both are guaranteed of berths in the 2008 Olympics. The losers figure in a third-place playoff. Before the tournament, the semifinal losers and the teams participating in the 5th-place playoff were assured of berths to the FIBA World Olympic Qualifying Tournament 2008.
  - Spain, which lost in the final to Russia, had already qualified for the Olympics as reigning world champions. Since they occupied what would otherwise be a qualifying place, third-place Lithuania received a direct Olympic berth, and seventh-place Slovenia advanced to the FIBA World Olympic Qualifying Tournament 2008.

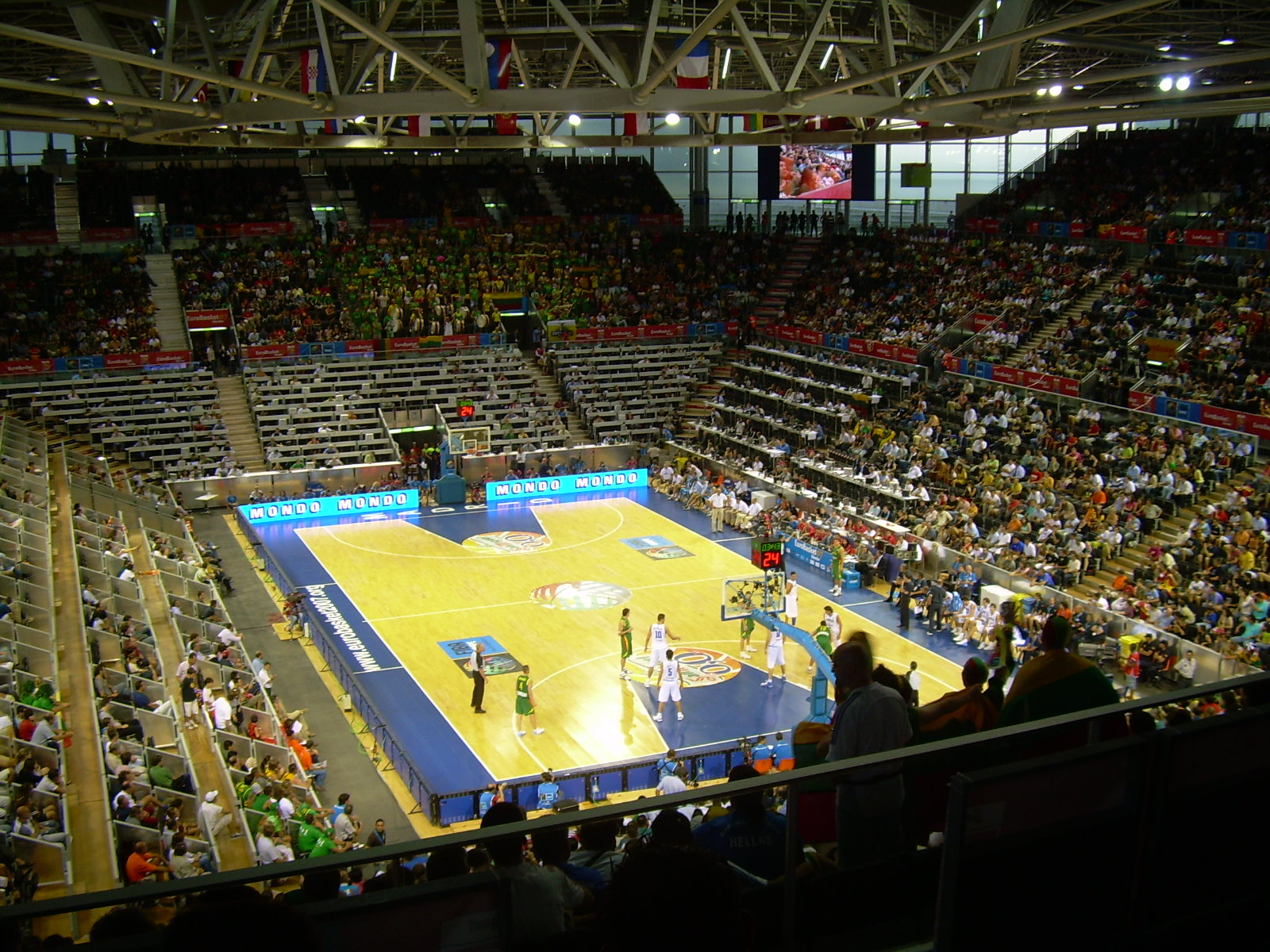
Match between Lithuania and Italy in the Madrid Arena

=== Tie-breaking criteria ===
Ties are broken via the following criteria, with the first option used first, all the way down to the last option:

1. Head to head results
2. Goal average (not the goal difference) in the games between the tied teams
3. Goal average in all games in its group

== Squads ==
At the start of tournament, all 16 participating countries had 12 players on their roster.

== Preliminary round ==
| Qualified for the second round |

Times given below are in Central European Summer Time (UTC+2).

=== Group A ===
| Team | Pld | W | L | PF | PA | PD | Pts |
|---|---|---|---|---|---|---|---|
| Russia | 3 | 3 | 0 | 224 | 174 | +50 | 6 |
| Greece | 3 | 2 | 1 | 197 | 194 | +3 | 5 |
| Israel | 3 | 1 | 2 | 209 | 249 | −40 | 4 |
| Serbia | 3 | 0 | 3 | 215 | 228 | −13 | 3 |

3 September
18:00

Boxscore

| Serbia | 65–73 | Russia |
Scoring by quarter: 13–21, 17–17, 18–16, 17–19
| Pts: Gurović 24; Rebs: Miličić 9 Asts: Jarić, Teodosić 3 | | Pts: Kirilenko 24; Rebs: Kirilenko 12; Asts: Holden 4 |

Palacio Municipal de Deportes de Granada, Granada
Attendance: 6,000
Referees: Fabio Facchini (ITA), Ivo Dolinek (CZE), Stelian Banica (ROU)

3 September
20:00

Boxscore

| Israel | 66–76 | Greece |
Scoring by quarter: 16–19, 15–12, 17–21, 18–24
| Pts: Halperin 20; Rebs: Tapiro 8 Asts: Halperin, Tapiro 6 | | Pts: Spanoulis 19; Rebs: Dikoudis 6 Asts: Tsartsaris 3 |

Palacio Municipal de Deportes de Granada, Granada
Attendance: 4,000
Referees: Saša Pukl (SLO), Virginijus Dovidavičius (LTU), Borys Ryzhyk (UKR)

4 September
18:00

Boxscore

| Russia | 90–56 | Israel |
Scoring by quarter: 17–15, 23–13, 26–13, 24–15
| Pts: Holden 18; Rebs: Kirilenko 13; Asts: Khryapa, Kirilenko5 | | Pts: Eliyahu 17; Rebs: Green 8 Asts: Pnini 2 |

Palacio Municipal de Deportes de Granada, Granada
Attendance: 4,350
Referees: Saša Pukl (SLO), Borys Ryzhyk (UKR), Eddie Viator (FRA)

4 September
20:30

Boxscore

| Greece | 68–67 (OT) | Serbia |
Scoring by quarter: 12–11, 19–20, 9–7, 16–18, Overtime: 12–11
| Pts: Dikoudis 20; Rebs: Dikoudis 8 Asts: Spanoulis 3 | | Pts: Jarić 18; Rebs: Erceg 12; Asts: Miličić 3 |

Palacio Municipal de Deportes de Granada, Granada
Attendance: 4,500
Referees: Fabio Facchini (ITA), Virginijus Dovidavičius (LTU), Stelian Banica (ROU)

5 September
18:00

Boxscore

| Israel | 87–83 | Serbia |
Scoring by quarter: 16–23, 20–22, 25–15, 26–23
| Pts: Green 26; Rebs: Green 12; Asts: Tapiro 4 | | Pts: Gurović 19; Rebs: Miličić 13; Asts: Jarić 6 |

Palacio Municipal de Deportes de Granada, Granada
Attendance: 3,500
Referees: Saša Pukl (SLO), Borys Ryzhyk (UKR), Eddie Viator (FRA)

5 September
20:30

Boxscore

| Russia | 61–53 | Greece |
Scoring by quarter: 15–8, 10–14, 19–16, 17–15
| Pts: Holden 17; Rebs: Kirilenko 17; Asts: 3 Players 2 | | Pts: Spanoulis 12; Rebs: Tsartsaris 7 Asts: Diamantidis 2 |

Palacio Municipal de Deportes de Granada, Granada
Attendance: 5,214
Referees: Fabio Facchini (ITA), Ivo Dolinek (CZE), Stelian Banica (ROU)

=== Group B ===
| Team | Pld | W | L | PF | PA | PD | Pts | Tie |
|---|---|---|---|---|---|---|---|---|
| Croatia | 3 | 2 | 1 | 252 | 237 | +15 | 5 | 1–0 |
| Spain | 3 | 2 | 1 | 259 | 218 | +41 | 5 | 0–1 |
| Portugal | 3 | 1 | 2 | 201 | 239 | −38 | 4 | 1–0 |
| Latvia | 3 | 1 | 2 | 229 | 247 | −18 | 4 | 0–1 |

3 September
19:00

Boxscore

| Latvia | 85–77 | Croatia |
Scoring by quarter: 18–18, 18–18, 20–15, 29–26
| Pts: Šķēle 17; Rebs: Biedriņš 7 Asts: Šķēle 5 | | Pts: Kasun 18; Rebs: Markota 7 Asts: Kus 6 |

Palacio Municipal de Deportes San Pablo, Seville
Attendance: 5,000
Referees: Luigi Lamonica (ITA), Mehmet Keseratar (TUR), Anibal Castaño (FRA)

3 September
21:30

Boxscore

| Portugal | 56–82 | Spain |
Scoring by quarter: 13–23, 8–23, 14–18, 21–18
| Pts: Cunha, Santos 9 Rebs: da Silva 5 Asts: Miranda 3 | | Pts: P. Gasol 19; Rebs: M. Gasol 7 Asts: 4 Players 3 |

Palacio Municipal de Deportes San Pablo, Seville
Attendance: 10,000
Referees: Kestutis Pilipauskas (LTU), Shay Shtriks (BUL), Oliver Krause (GER)

4 September
19:00

Boxscore

| Croatia | 90–68 | Portugal |
Scoring by quarter: 19–19, 23–17, 33–14, 15–18
| Pts: Popović 14; Rebs: Prkačin 5 Asts: Prkačin, Ukić 3 | | Pts: Gomes 17; Rebs: Santos 9 Asts: Miranda 4 |

Palacio Municipal de Deportes San Pablo, Seville
Attendance: 6,000
Referees: Kestutis Pilipauskas (LTU), Shay Shtriks (BUL), Mehmet Keseratar (TUR)

4 September
21:30

Boxscore

| Spain | 93–77 | Latvia |
Scoring by quarter: 25–20, 16–16, 29–19, 23–22
| Pts: P. Gasol 26; Rebs: P. Gasol 9 Asts: 3 Players 3 | | Pts: Biedriņš 17; Rebs: Biedriņš 5 Asts: 3 Players 3 |

Palacio Municipal de Deportes San Pablo, Seville
Attendance: 10,000
Referees: Grzegorz Ziemblicki (POL), Anibal Castaño (FRA), Oliver Krause (GER)

5 September
18:00

Boxscore

| Portugal | 77–67 | Latvia |
Scoring by quarter: 17–9, 11–15, 27–20, 22–23
| Pts: Gil Fernandes, Santos 14; Rebs: Santos 8 Asts: Gil Fernandes, Gomes 3 | | Pts: Janičenoks 21; Rebs: Biedriņš 18; Asts: Šķēle 4 |

Palacio Municipal de Deportes San Pablo, Seville
Attendance: 5,500
Referees: Luigi Lamonica (ITA), Oliver Krause (GER), Mehmet Keseratar (TUR)

5 September
21:30

Boxscore

| Croatia | 85–84 | Spain |
Scoring by quarter: 21–28, 19–22, 27–15, 18–19
| Pts: Popović 18; Rebs: Banić 9 Asts: Tomas 4 | | Pts: P. Gasol 26; Rebs: Reyes 10; Asts: Calderón 3 |

Palacio Municipal de Deportes San Pablo, Seville
Attendance: 10,000
Referees: Kestutis Pilipauskas (LTU), Grzegorz Ziemblicki (POL), Anibal Castaño (FRA)

=== Group C ===
| Team | Pld | W | L | PF | PA | PD | Pts |
|---|---|---|---|---|---|---|---|
| Lithuania | 3 | 3 | 0 | 265 | 224 | +41 | 6 |
| Germany | 3 | 2 | 1 | 242 | 211 | +31 | 5 |
| Turkey | 3 | 1 | 2 | 198 | 237 | −39 | 4 |
| Czech Republic | 3 | 0 | 3 | 225 | 258 | −33 | 3 |

3 September
18:00

Boxscore

| Czech Republic | 78–83 (OT) | Germany |
Scoring by quarter: 14–12, 17–13, 13–21, 30–28, Overtime: 4–9
| Pts: Welsch 22; Rebs: Bartoň 10; Asts: Bartoň, Whitfield 4 | | Pts: Nowitzki 35; Rebs: Nowitzki, Okulaja 11; Asts: Demirel 2 |

Palma Arena, Palma de Mallorca
Attendance: 5,843
Referees: Nikolaos Zavlanos (GRE), Antonio Coelho (POR), Oļegs Latiševs (LAT)

3 September
20:30

Boxscore

| Turkey | 69–86 | Lithuania |
Scoring by quarter: 16–19, 20–25, 12–19, 21–23
| Pts: Türkoğlu 18; Rebs: Okur 10; Asts: 3 Players 2 | | Pts: Jasikevičius 18; Rebs: Jasikevičius, K. Lavrinovič 8 Asts: Jasikevičius 7 |

Palma Arena, Palma de Mallorca
Attendance: 3,620
Referees: Dubravko Muhvić (CRO), Ilija Belošević (SRB), Zoran Šutulović (MNE)

4 September
18:00

Boxscore

| Lithuania | 95–75 | Czech Republic |
Scoring by quarter: 32–15, 22–16, 18–24, 23–20
| Pts: K. Lavrinovič 22; Rebs: 3 Players 5 Asts: Kaukėnas 5 | | Pts: Welsch 18; Rebs: Bartoň 8 Asts: Welsch, Whitfield 6 |

Palma Arena, Palma de Mallorca
Attendance: 5,423
Referees: Dubravko Muhvić (CRO), Zoran Šutulović (MNE), Oļegs Latiševs (LAT)

4 September
20:30

Boxscore

| Germany | 79–49 | Turkey |
Scoring by quarter: 16–11, 24–16, 18–12, 21–10
| Pts: Nowitzki 24; Rebs: Okulaja 9 Asts: 4 Players 2 | | Pts: Türkoğlu 15; Rebs: İlyasova 6 Asts: Akyol, Erden 1 |

Palma Arena, Palma de Mallorca
Attendance: 5,843
Referees: Juan Arteaga (ESP), Antonio Coelho (POR), Ilija Belošević (SRB)

5 September
18:00

Boxscore

| Lithuania | 84–80 | Germany |
Scoring by quarter: 30–17, 19–15, 19–25, 16–23
| Pts: D. Lavrinovič 18; Rebs: Kaukėnas 9 Asts: Jasikevičius 10 | | Pts: Nowitzki 28; Rebs: Nowitzki 9 Asts: Nowitzki 2 |

Palma Arena, Palma de Mallorca
Attendance: 5,983
Referees: Nikolaos Zavlanos (GRE), Juan Arteaga (ESP), Ilija Belošević (SRB)

5 September
20:30

Boxscore

| Czech Republic | 72–80 | Turkey |
Scoring by quarter: 15–28, 16–18, 18–13, 23–21
| Pts: Bartoň 22; Rebs: Necas, Welsch 5 Asts: Bartoň 4 | | Pts: Türkoğlu 22; Rebs: Okur 10; Asts: Atsür 4 |

Palma Arena, Palma de Mallorca
Attendance: 3,820
Referees: Dubravko Muhvić (CRO), Antonio Coelho (POR), Zoran Šutulović (MNE)

=== Group D ===
| Team | Pld | W | L | PF | PA | PD | Pts |
|---|---|---|---|---|---|---|---|
| Slovenia | 3 | 3 | 0 | 206 | 186 | +20 | 6 |
| France | 3 | 2 | 1 | 209 | 195 | +14 | 5 |
| Italy | 3 | 1 | 2 | 209 | 208 | +1 | 4 |
| Poland | 3 | 0 | 3 | 188 | 223 | −35 | 3 |

3 September
19:00

Boxscore

| Poland | 66–74 | France |
Scoring by quarter: 18–22, 14–13, 21–25, 13–14
| Pts: Wójcik 19; Rebs: Dylewicz 8 Asts: Dylewicz 4 | | Pts: Parker 16; Rebs: 4 Players 4 Asts: Gomis, Parker 4 |

Centro de Tecnificación de Alicante, Alicante
Attendance: 3,000
Referees: Volodymyr Drabikovskyi (UKR), Sreten Radović (CRO), Sergey Bulanov (RUS)

3 September
21:30

Boxscore

| Italy | 68–69 | Slovenia |
Scoring by quarter: 14–21, 11–17, 20–18, 23–13
| Pts: Bulleri 20; Rebs: Basile 7 Asts: Bulleri 3 | | Pts: Smodiš 27; Rebs: Nesterović 6 Asts: Lakovič, Smodiš 3 |

Centro de Tecnificación de Alicante, Alicante
Attendance: 2,500
Referees: Lazaros Voreadis (GRE), Vicente Bulto (ESP), Oliver Lefwerth (SWE)

4 September
19:00

Boxscore

| France | 69–62 | Italy |
Scoring by quarter: 17–20, 14–16, 20–11, 18–15
| Pts: Parker 36; Rebs: Weis 8 Asts: Parker 2 | | Pts: Bargnani 16; Rebs: Gigli 9 Asts: Soragna 4 |

Centro de Tecnificación de Alicante, Alicante
Attendance: 3,000
Referees: Lazaros Voreadis (GRE), Sreten Radović (CRO), Milivoje Jovčić (SRB)

4 September
21:30

Boxscore

| Slovenia | 70–52 | Poland |
Scoring by quarter: 13–19, 21–7, 12–7, 24–19
| Pts: Lorbek 16; Rebs: Nesterović 12; Asts: Lakovič 5 | | Pts: Pluta 12; Rebs: Dylewicz 9 Asts: Skibniewski 2 |

Centro de Tecnificación de Alicante, Alicante
Attendance: 2,400
Referees: Vicente Bulto (ESP), Sergey Bulanov (RUS), Oscar Lefwerth (SWE)

5 September
19:00

Boxscore

| Slovenia | 67–66 | France |
Scoring by quarter: 16–18, 15–21, 21–17, 15–10
| Pts: Lorbek, Smodiš 15; Rebs: Smodiš 6 Asts: Dragić, Lakovič 4 | | Pts: Parker 25; Rebs: 3 Players 5 Asts: 3 Players 1 |

Centro de Tecnificación de Alicante, Alicante
Attendance: 2,700
Referees: Lazaros Voreadis (GRE), Volodymyr Drabikovskyi (UKR), Milivoje Jovčić (SRB)

5 September
21:30

Boxscore

| Poland | 70–79 | Italy |
Scoring by quarter: 16–14, 19–27, 22–23, 13–15
| Pts: Pluta 15; Rebs: Dylewicz 7 Asts: Koszarek 11 | | Pts: Belinelli 20; Rebs: Bargnani 7 Asts: Bulleri 8 |

Centro de Tecnificación de Alicante, Alicante
Attendance: 3,000
Referees: Sreten Radović (CRO), Vicente Bulto (ESP), Oscar Lefwerth (SWE)

== Second round ==
| Advanced to the knockout round |

=== Group E ===
| Team | Pld | W | L | PF | PA | PD | Pts |
|---|---|---|---|---|---|---|---|
| Spain | 5 | 4 | 1 | 422 | 341 | +81 | 9 |
| Russia | 5 | 4 | 1 | 381 | 325 | +56 | 9 |
| Greece | 5 | 3 | 2 | 353 | 348 | +5 | 8 |
| Croatia | 5 | 2 | 3 | 398 | 396 | +2 | 7 |
| Portugal | 5 | 1 | 4 | 350 | 420 | −70 | 6 |
| Israel | 5 | 1 | 4 | 360 | 434 | −74 | 6 |

7 September
16:30

Boxscore

| Portugal | 65–78 | Russia |
Scoring by quarter: 13–16, 17–28, 19–24, 16–10
| Pts: Coelho 11; Rebs: Évora 6 Asts: Gil Fernandes, Miranda 2 | | Pts: Kirilenko 16; Rebs: Khryapa 11; Asts: Kirilenko 3 |

Madrid Arena, Madrid
Referees: Grzegorz Ziemblicki (POL), Mehmet Keresatar (TUR), Oliver Krause (GER)

7 September
19:00

Boxscore

| Israel | 80–75 | Croatia |
Scoring by quarter: 14–17, 19–18, 20–16, 27–24
| Pts: Green 17; Rebs: Green 16; Asts: Tapiro 7 | | Pts: Kasun 18; Rebs: Kasun, Markota 7 Asts: Kus 4 |

Madrid Arena, Madrid
Attendance: 3,500
Referees: Fabio Facchini (ITA), Zoran Šutulović (MNE), Oliver Lefwerth (SWE)

7 September
21:30

Boxscore

| Spain | 76–58 | Greece |
Scoring by quarter: 23–15, 22–9, 11–15, 20–19
| Pts: Fernández 20; Rebs: Reyes 8 Asts: P. Gasol 5 | | Pts: Bourousis 10; Rebs: Bourousis, Tsartsaris 5 Asts: Papaloukas 5 |

Madrid Arena, Madrid
Attendance: 10,000
Referees: Luigi Lamonica (ITA), Ilija Belošević (SRB), Borys Ryzhyk (UKR)

9 September
16:30

Boxscore

| Portugal | 94–85 | Israel |
Scoring by quarter: 28–14, 18–20, 19–14, 29–37
| Pts: Gomes 23; Rebs: Gomes 11; Asts: da Silva 9 | | Pts: Eliyahu 29; Rebs: Eliyahu 9 Asts: Tapiro 6 |

Madrid Arena, Madrid
Attendance: 4,500
Referees: Kestutis Pilipauskas (LTU), Anibal Castaño (FRA), Oļegs Latiševs (LAT)

9 September
19:00

Boxscore

| Greece | 81–78 | Croatia |
Scoring by quarter: 20–19, 13–21, 25–14, 23–24
| Pts: Diamantidis 23; Rebs: Diamantidis, Papadopoulos 6 Asts: Diamantidis, Spanoulis 3 | | Pts: Kasun 15; Rebs: Kasun 6 Asts: Popović 4 |

Madrid Arena, Madrid
Attendance: 6,000
Referees: Fabio Facchini (ITA), Grzegorz Ziemblicki (POL), Ivo Dolinek (CZE)

9 September
21:30

Boxscore

| Russia | 69–81 | Spain |
Scoring by quarter: 23–20, 12–20, 16–23, 18–18
| Pts: Kirilenko 21; Rebs: Khryapa 11; Asts: Holden 4 | | Pts: Calderón 17; Rebs: P. Gasol 9 Asts: Calderón 4 |

Madrid Arena, Madrid
Attendance: 10,000
Referees: Saša Pukl (SLO), Zoran Šutulović (MNE), Oscar Lefwerth (SWE)

11 September
16:30

Boxscore

| Croatia | 70–83 | Russia |
Scoring by quarter: 21–19, 21–22, 14–19, 14–23
| Pts: Kus 17; Rebs: 3 Players 5 Asts: Planinić 4 | | Pts: Kirilenko 20; Rebs: Khryapa, Kirilenko 8 Asts: Padius 5 |

Madrid Arena, Madrid
Attendance: 5,500
Referees: Luigi Lamonica (ITA), Kestutis Pilipauskas (LTU), Mehmet Keseratar (TUR)

11 September
19:00

Boxscore

| Greece | 85–67 | Portugal |
Scoring by quarter: 16–17, 29–17, 19–13, 21–20
| Pts: Dikoudis 17; Rebs: Dikoudis 9 Asts: Papaloukas 4 | | Pts: Santos 17; Rebs: Évora 6 Asts: da Silva 5 |

Madrid Arena, Madrid
Attendance: 6,000
Referees: Ilija Belošević (SRB), Stelian Banica (ROU), Virginijus Dovidavičius (LTU)

11 September
21:30

Boxscore

| Spain | 99–73 | Israel |
Scoring by quarter: 19–29, 28–19, 27–20, 25–5
| Pts: P. Gasol 26; Rebs: Jiménez 7 Asts: 3 Players 3 | | Pts: 3 Players 15; Rebs: Green 10; Asts: Tapiro 7 |

Madrid Arena, Madrid
Attendance: 9,500
Referees: Volodymyr Drabikovskyi (UKR), Milivoje Jovčić (SRB), Eddie Viator (FRA)

=== Group F ===
| Team | Pld | W | L | PF | PA | PD | Pts |
|---|---|---|---|---|---|---|---|
| Lithuania | 5 | 5 | 0 | 417 | 357 | +60 | 10 |
| Slovenia | 5 | 4 | 1 | 340 | 312 | +28 | 9 |
| France | 5 | 3 | 2 | 371 | 347 | +24 | 8 |
| Germany | 5 | 2 | 3 | 339 | 346 | −7 | 7 |
| Italy | 5 | 1 | 4 | 346 | 359 | −13 | 6 |
| Turkey | 5 | 0 | 5 | 308 | 400 | −92 | 5 |

8 September
16:30

Boxscore

| France | 78–66 | Germany |
Scoring by quarter: 26–20, 21–19, 15–10, 16–17
| Pts: Parker 23; Rebs: Diaw 10; Asts: Diawara, Parker 3 | | Pts: Nowitzki 28; Rebs: Okulaja 9 Asts: Roller 2 |

Madrid Arena, Madrid
Referees: Dubravko Muhvić (CRO), Vicente Bulto (ESP), Antonio Coelho (POR)

8 September
19:00

Boxscore

| Italy | 74–79 | Lithuania |
Scoring by quarter: 13–21, 26–19, 22–22, 13–17
| Pts: Bargnani 15; Rebs: Bargnani 7 Asts: Marconato 2 | | Pts: Kaukėnas 22; Rebs: Kleiza 9 Asts: Jasikevičius 4 |

Madrid Arena, Madrid
Attendance: 5,500
Referees: Nikolaos Zavlanos (GRE), Volodymyr Drabikovskyi (UKR), Milivoje Jovčić (SRB)

8 September
21:30

Boxscore

| Turkey | 51–66 | Slovenia |
Scoring by quarter: 15–20, 14–11, 11–15, 11–20
| Pts: Türkoğlu 17; Rebs: Gönlüm 9 Asts: Atsür 2 | | Pts: Nesterović 13; Rebs: Jagodnik 8 Asts: 3 Players 3 |

Madrid Arena, Madrid
Attendance: 7,000
Referees: Juan Arteaga (ESP), Ivo Dolinek (CZE), Sreten Radović (CRO)

10 September
16:30

Boxscore

| Italy | 84–75 (OT) | Turkey |
Scoring by quarter: 15–29, 19–14, 24–11, 12–16, Overtime: 14–5
| Pts: Belinelli, Gigli 17; Rebs: Gigli 10; Asts: Belinelli, Bulleri 4 | | Pts: Türkoğlu 34; Rebs: Okur 9 Asts: Türkoğlu 4 |

Madrid Arena, Madrid
Referees: Dubravko Muhvić (CRO), Lazaros Voreadis (GRE), Sergey Bulanov (RUS)

10 September
19:00

Boxscore

| Lithuania | 88–73 | France |
Scoring by quarter: 19–18, 29–14, 20–28, 20–13
| Pts: Šiškauskas 19; Rebs: Songaila 7 Asts: Jasikevičius 7 | | Pts: Piétrus 13; Rebs: Diaw 7 Asts: Parker 6 |

Madrid Arena, Madrid
Referees: Nikolaos Zavlanos (GRE), Sreten Radović (CRO), Vicente Bulto (ESP)

10 September
21:30

Boxscore

| Germany | 47–77 | Slovenia |
Scoring by quarter: 9–30, 13–15, 12–18, 13–14
| Pts: Nowitzki 16; Rebs: Nowitzki 8 Asts: 4 Players 1 | | Pts: Smodiš 22; Rebs: Dragić, Nesterović 7 Asts: Lakovič 5 |

Madrid Arena, Madrid
Referees: Juan Arteaga (ESP), Milivoje Jovčić (SRB), Shay Shtriks (BUL)

12 September
16:30

Boxscore

| Germany | 67–58 | Italy |
Scoring by quarter: 12–18, 15–9, 19–10, 21–21
| Pts: Herber, Nowitzki 15; Rebs: Jagla, Nowitzki 10; Asts: Nowitzki 3 | | Pts: Belinelli 25; Rebs: 3 Players 6 Asts: Bulleri 3 |

Madrid Arena, Madrid
Attendance: 4,000
Referees: Dubravko Muhvić (CRO), Grzegorz Ziemblicki (POL), Ivo Dolinek (CZE)

12 September
19:00

Boxscore

| France | 85–64 | Turkey |
Scoring by quarter: 20–22, 23–13, 13–8, 29–21
| Pts: Diaw 18; Rebs: Diaw 6 Asts: 3 Players 2 | | Pts: Peker 19; Rebs: Okur 6 Asts: Arslan 4 |

Madrid Arena, Madrid
Attendance: 7,500
Referees: Juan Arteaga (ESP), Oscar Lefwerth (SWE), Oļegs Latiševs (LAT)

12 September
21:30

Boxscore

| Slovenia | 61–80 | Lithuania |
Scoring by quarter: 18–26, 23–18, 8–19, 12–17
| Pts: Lakovič 15; Rebs: Nesterović 5 Asts: Lakovič 3 | | Pts: Šiškauskas 21; Rebs: Kleiza 7 Asts: Kaukėnas 4 |

Madrid Arena, Madrid
Attendance: 6,500
Referees: Zoran Šutulović (MNE), Vicente Bulto (ESP), Borys Ryzhyk (UKR)

== Knockout stage ==
=== Championship bracket ===
Quarter-finals
13 September – 21:30
Spain | 83
Germany | 55
14 September – 21:30
Slovenia | 62
Greece | 63
13 September – 19:00
Russia | 75
France | 71
14 September – 19:00
Lithuania | 74
Croatia | 72

Semi-finals
15 September – 19:00
Spain | 82
Greece | 77
15 September – 21:30
Russia | 86
Lithuania | 74

Final
16 September – 21:30
Spain | 59
Russia | 60
Third place
16 September – 19:00
Greece | 69
Lithuania | 78

==== Quarterfinals ====
13 September
17:30

Boxscore

| Russia | 75–71 | France |
Scoring by quarter: 21–23, 18–19, 14–14, 22–15
| Pts: Khryapa 20; Rebs: Khryapa 16; Asts: Khryapa 2 | | Pts: Diaw 23; Rebs: Turiaf 11; Asts: Parker 3 |

Palacio de Deportes de la Comunidad de Madrid, Madrid
Referees: Nikolaos Zavlanos (GRE), Ilija Belošević (SRB), Gzregorz Ziemblicki (POL)

13 September
21:30

Boxscore

| Spain | 83–55 | Germany |
Scoring by quarter: 18–14, 22–13, 26–16, 17–12
| Pts: Calderón 17; Rebs: 3 Players 5 Asts: Jiménez, Mumbrú 2 | | Pts: Nowitzki 11; Rebs: Jagla 7 Asts: Hamann 6 |

Palacio de Deportes de la Comunidad de Madrid, Madrid
Referees: Luigi Lamonica (ITA), Kestutis Pilipauskas (LTU), Anibal Castaño (FRA)

14 September
19:00

Boxscore

| Lithuania | 74–72 | Croatia |
Scoring by quarter: 17–19, 21–16, 15–20, 21–17
| Pts: Songaila 20; Rebs: Kleiza 9 Asts: Jasikevičius 8 | | Pts: Planinić 16; Rebs: Barać 6 Asts: Planinić 5 |

Palacio de Deportes de la Comunidad de Madrid, Madrid
Referees: Lazaros Voreadis (GRE), Saša Pukl (SLO), Oliver Krause (GER)

14 September
21:30

Boxscore

| Slovenia | 62–63 | Greece |
Scoring by quarter: 17–14, 17–14, 17–12, 11–23
| Pts: Nesterović 16; Rebs: Nesterović 11; Asts: 4 Players 3 | | Pts: Papaloukas 17; Rebs: Diamantidis 6 Asts: Diamantidis 3 |

Palacio de Deportes de la Comunidad de Madrid, Madrid
Referees: Fabio Facchini (ITA), Dubravko Muhvić (CRO), Ivo Dolinek (CZE)

==== Semifinals ====
15 September
19:00

Boxscore

| Spain | 82–77 | Greece |
Scoring by quarter: 24–18, 17–21, 18–21, 23–17
| Pts: P. Gasol, Navarro 23; Rebs: P. Gasol 6 Asts: Garbajosa 4 | | Pts: Spanoulis 24; Rebs: Diamantidis 9 Asts: Spanoulis 5 |

Palacio de Deportes de la Comunidad de Madrid, Madrid
Referees: Volodymyr Drabikovskyi (UKR), Milivoje Jovčić (SRB), Grzegorz Ziemblicki (POL)

15 September
21:30

Boxscore

| Russia | 86–74 | Lithuania |
Scoring by quarter: 25–12, 15–21, 25–25, 21–16
| Pts: Kirilenko 29; Rebs: Kirilenko 8 Asts: Khryapa 4 | | Pts: Šiškauskas 30; Rebs: Songaila 6 Asts: Šiškauskas 4 |

Palacio de Deportes de la Comunidad de Madrid, Madrid
Referees: Luigi Lamonica (ITA), Dubravko Muhvić (CRO), Zoran Šutulović (MNE)

==== Third place ====
16 September
19:00

Boxscore

| Greece | 69–78 | Lithuania |
Scoring by quarter: 19–20, 15–21, 20–21, 15–16
| Pts: Zisis 23; Rebs: Diamantidis 7 Asts: Diamantidis 4 | | Pts: K. Lavrinovič 19; Rebs: Kleiza 8 Asts: K. Lavrinovič, Šiškauskas 5 |

Palacio de Deportes de la Comunidad de Madrid, Madrid
Referees: Fabio Facchini (ITA), Dubravko Muhvić (CRO), Saša Pukl (SLO)

==== Final ====
16 September
21:30

Boxscore

| Spain | 59–60 | Russia |
Scoring by quarter: 22–11, 12–20, 15–15, 10–14
| Pts: Calderón 15; Rebs: P. Gasol 14; Asts: P. Gasol 3 | | Pts: Kirilenko 17; Rebs: Khryapa 12; Asts: Khryapa 4 |

Palacio de Deportes de la Comunidad de Madrid, Madrid
Attendance: 15,500
Referees: Nikolaos Zavlanos (GRE), Ilija Belošević (SRB), Zoran Šutulović (MNE)

Game Statistics

Spain

| # | Player | Min played | Pts | FT | 2-FG | 3-FG | Rebs | Assists |
|---|---|---|---|---|---|---|---|---|
| 4 | Pau Gasol | 33 | 14 | 5/12 | 3/12 | 1/1 | 14 | 3 |
| 5 | Rudy Fernández | 24 | 5 | 2/2 | 0/2 | 1/3 | 2 | 1 |
| 6 | Carlos Cabezas | 10 | 2 | - | 1/2 | 0/1 | – | 1 |
| 7 | Juan Carlos Navarro | 17 | – | - | 0/3 | 0/2 | – | 1 |
| 8 | José Calderón | 28 | 15 | - | 0/2 | 5/7 | 4 | 2 |
| 9 | Felipe Reyes | 21 | 5 | 1/2 | 2/9 | – | 8 | – |
| 10 | Carlos Jiménez | 28 | 5 | 2/4 | 0/2 | 1/4 | 5 | 2 |
| 11 | Sergio Rodríguez | 2 | – | - | – | 0/1 | – | – |
| 12 | Berni Rodríguez | 1 | – | – | – | – | – | – |
| 13 | Marc Gasol | 6 | 5 | 5/6 | 0/1 | – | – | – |
| 14 | Álex Mumbrú | 12 | – | - | 0/1 | – | 1 | – |
| 15 | Jorge Garbajosa | 18 | 8 | - | 1/1 | 2/5 | – | – |
| | TOTALS (Team) | 200 | 59 | 15/26 | 7/35 | 10/24 | 43 | 11 |

Head Coach: (Spain) Pepu Hernández

Russia

| # | Player | Min played | Pts | FT | 2-FG | 3-FG | Rebs | Assists |
|---|---|---|---|---|---|---|---|---|
| 4 | Nikita Shabalkin | – | – | – | – | – | – | – |
| 5 | Jon Robert Holden | 39 | 8 | - | 4/9 | 0/4 | 1 | 1 |
| 6 | Sergei Bykov | – | – | – | – | – | – | – |
| 7 | Andrei Kirilenko | 30 | 17 | 6/7 | 4/6 | 1/4 | 5 | 2 |
| 8 | Nikita Morgunov | 9 | 4 | - | 2/5 | 0/1 | 2 | – |
| 9 | Petr Samoylenko | 16 | – | - | 0/2 | – | 2 | 1 |
| 10 | Victor Khryapa | 35 | 7 | - | 2/2 | 1/6 | 12 | 4 |
| 11 | Zakhar Pashutin | 18 | 3 | - | 0/2 | 1/2 | 3 | 1 |
| 12 | Sergei Monia | 9 | 3 | - | – | 1/2 | 1 | 1 |
| 13 | Anton Ponkrashov | 18 | 8 | 3/4 | 1/1 | 1/1 | 3 | 2 |
| 14 | Aleksey Savrasenko | 24 | 10 | 2/4 | 4/8 | – | 1 | 1 |
| 15 | Nikolay Padius | 4 | – | – | – | – | – | – |
| | TOTALS (Team) | 200 | 60 | 11/15 | 17/35 | 5/20 | 38 | 13 |

Head Coach: (United States) David Blatt

Legend: PTS = points, FT = free-throws (made/attempts), 2-FG = 2-point field goals (made/attempts), 3-PG = 3-point field goals (made/attempts), Rebs = Rebounds

=== 5th to 8th place ===
Classification round
15 September – 14:00
France | 69
Croatia | 86
15 September – 16:30
Germany | 69
Slovenia | 65

Fifth place
16 September – 16:30
Croatia | 71
Germany | 80
Seventh place
16 September – 14:00
France | 74
Slovenia | 88

14 September
14:00

Boxscore

| France | 69–86 | Croatia |
Scoring by quarter: 13–21, 18–26, 19–14, 19–25
| Pts: Parker 18; Rebs: Kirksay 6 Asts: Diaw 5 | | Pts: Planinić, Popović 15; Rebs: Barać 7 Asts: Planinić, Ukić 3 |

Palacio de Deportes de la Comunidad de Madrid, Madrid
Referees: Fabio Facchini (ITA), Milivoje Jovčić (SRB), Borys Ryzhyk (UKR)

15 September
16:30

Boxscore

| Germany | 69–65 | Slovenia |
Scoring by quarter: 18–16, 14–15, 14–23, 23–11
| Pts: Nowitzki 28; Rebs: Nowitzki 10; Asts: Hamann 4 | | Pts: Lakovič 17; Rebs: Nesterović 9 Asts: Lakovič 6 |

Palacio de Deportes de la Comunidad de Madrid, Madrid
Referees: Juan Arteaga (ESP), Lazaros Voreadis (GRE), Oscar Lefwerth (SWE)

16 September
14:00

Boxscore

| France | 74–88 | Slovenia |
Scoring by quarter: 17–18, 23–18, 17–15, 17–37
| Pts: Parker 31; Rebs: Turiaf 8 Asts: Parker 4 | | Pts: Lakovič 26; Rebs: Nesterović 8 Asts: Lakovič 7 |

Palacio de Deportes de la Comunidad de Madrid, Madrid
Referees: Luigi Lamonica (ITA), Kestutis Pilipauskas (LTU), Sreten Radović (CRO)

16 September
16:30

Boxscore

| Croatia | 71–80 | Germany |
Scoring by quarter: 25–16, 19–20, 13–22, 14–22
| Pts: Banić 16; Rebs: Kasun 6 Asts: Planinić 4 | | Pts: Nowitzki 31; Rebs: Nowitzki 12; Asts: Garrett, Nowitzki 4 |

Palacio de Deportes de la Comunidad de Madrid, Madrid
Referees: Juan Arteaga (ESP), Shay Shtriks (BUL), Antonio Coelho (POR)

== Statistical leaders ==
=== Individual Tournament Highs ===
Points

| Pos. | Name | PPG |
|---|---|---|
| 1 | (Germany) Dirk Nowitzki | 24.0 |
| 2 | (France) Tony Parker | 20.1 |
| 3 | (Turkey) Hedo Türkoğlu | 19.2 |
| 4 | (Spain) Pau Gasol | 18.8 |
| 5 | (Russia) Andrei Kirilenko | 18.0 |
| 6 | (Italy) Marco Belinelli | 15.5 |
| 7 | (Israel) Yotam Halperin | 14.0 |
| 8 | (Lithuania) Ramūnas Šiškauskas | 13.8 |
| 9 | (Slovenia) Matjaž Smodiš | 13.4 |
| 10 | (Croatia) Marko Popović | 13.1 |

Rebounds

| Pos. | Name | RPG |
|---|---|---|
| 1 | (Israel) Yaniv Green | 9.3 |
| 2 | (Germany) Dirk Nowitzki | 8.7 |
| 3 | (Russia) Andrei Kirilenko | 8.6 |
| 4 | (Russia) Victor Khryapa | 7.8 |
| 5 | (Turkey) Mehmet Okur | 7.7 |
| 6 | (Slovenia) Radoslav Nesterović | 7.6 |
| 7 | (Spain) Pau Gasol | 7.0 |
| 8 | (Germany) Ademola Okulaja | 6.9 |
| 9 | (Italy) Angelo Gigli | 6.0 |
| 10 | (Spain) Felipe Reyes | 5.9 |

Assists

| Pos. | Name | APG |
|---|---|---|
| 1 | (Lithuania) Šarūnas Jasikevičius | 5.6 |
| 2 | (Israel) Meir Tapiro | 5.0 |
| 3 | (Slovenia) Jaka Lakovič | 4.3 |
| 3 | (Italy) Massimo Bulleri | 4.0 |
| 4 | (Russia) Victor Khryapa | 3.2 |
| 4 | (Portugal) Filipe da Silva | 3.2 |
| 7 | (France) Tony Parker | 2.8 |
| 7 | (Croatia) Zoran Planinić | 2.8 |
| 7 | (Israel) Yotam Halperin | 2.8 |
| 10 | (Spain) José Calderón | 2.6 |
| 10 | (Lithuania) Ramūnas Šiškauskas | 2.6 |

Steals

| Pos. | Name | SPG |
|---|---|---|
| 1 | (Russia) Andrei Kirilenko | 2.2 |
| 2 | (Russia) Victor Khryapa | 2.1 |
| 2 | (Croatia) Zoran Planinić | 1.6 |
| 4 | (Italy) Angelo Gigli | 1.5 |
| 4 | (Israel) Meir Tapiro | 1.5 |
| 6 | (France) Tariq Kirksay | 1.4 |
| 6 | (Slovenia) Jaka Lakovič | 1.4 |
| 6 | (Lithuania) Ramūnas Šiškauskas | 1.4 |
| 9 | (Greece) Dimitris Diamantidis | 1.3 |
| 9 | (Spain) Rudy Fernández | 1.3 |
| 9 | (Italy) Matteo Soragna | 1.3 |

Blocks

| Pos. | Name | BPG |
|---|---|---|
| 1 | (Slovenia) Radoslav Nesterović | 1.9 |
| 2 | (Spain) Pau Gasol | 1.8 |
| 2 | (Russia) Andrei Kirilenko | 1.8 |
| 4 | (Israel) Yaniv Green | 1.5 |
| 5 | (Italy) Angelo Gigli | 1.2 |
| 6 | (France) Ronny Turiaf | 1.1 |
| 6 | (Greece) Dimitris Diamantidis | 1.0 |
| 8 | (Germany) Dirk Nowitzki | 0.9 |
| 9 | (Lithuania) Darjuš Lavrinovič | 0.8 |
| 9 | (Turkey) Kaya Peker | 0.8 |

Minutes

| Pos. | Name | MPG |
|---|---|---|
| 1 | (Russia) Jon Robert Holden | 35.3 |
| 2 | (Slovenia) Jaka Lakovič | 34.3 |
| 3 | (Germany) Dirk Nowitzki | 33.9 |
| 4 | (Lithuania) Ramūnas Šiškauskas | 33.0 |
| 5 | (Greece) Dimitris Diamantidis | 32.8 |
| 6 | (Russia) Andrei Kirilenko | 32.4 |
| 7 | (Israel) Yotam Halperin | 31.5 |
| 8 | (France) Tony Parker | 30.9 |
| 9 | (Russia) Victor Khryapa | 30.6 |
| 10 | (Turkey) Hedo Türkoğlu | 30.2 |

=== Individual Game Highs ===
| Department | Name | Total | Opponent |
|---|---|---|---|
| Points | (France) Tony Parker | 36 | Italy |
| Rebounds | (Latvia) Andris Biedriņš | 18 | Portugal |
| Assists | (Poland) Łukasz Koszarek | 11 | Italy |
| Steals | (Russia) Andrei Kirilenko (Croatia) Zoran Planinić | 7 | France; Lithuania |
| Blocks | (Slovenia) Radoslav Nesterović | 5 | Greece |
| Turnovers | (Lithuania) Šarūnas Jasikevičius (Lithuania) Rimantas Kaukėnas | 7 | Italy; Czech Republic |

=== Team Tournament Highs ===
Offensive PPG

| Pos. | Name | PPG |
|---|---|---|
| 1 | Spain | 82.1 |
| 2 | Lithuania | 82.0 |
| 3 | Croatia | 78.2 |
| 4 | Latvia | 76.3 |
| 5 | Czech Republic | 75.0 |
| 5 | Russia | 75.0 |

Rebounds

| Pos. | Name | RPG |
|---|---|---|
| 1 | Lithuania | 39.8 |
| 2 | Serbia | 39.7 |
| 3 | Germany | 37.9 |
| 4 | Turkey | 37.0 |
| 5 | Spain | 35.2 |

Assists

| Pos. | Name | APG |
|---|---|---|
| 1 | Czech Republic | 14.3 |
| 2 | Russia | 14.1 |
| 3 | Israel | 13.7 |
| 4 | Lithuania | 13.4 |
| 5 | Croatia | 13.2 |
| 5 | Spain | 13.2 |

Steals

| Pos. | Name | SPG |
|---|---|---|
| 1 | Russia | 8.4 |
| 2 | Czech Republic | 8.0 |
| 3 | Greece | 7.9 |
| 4 | Spain | 7.8 |
| 5 | Serbia | 7.7 |

Blocks

| Pos. | Name | BPG |
|---|---|---|
| 1 | Serbia | 4.3 |
| 2 | Russia | 3.8 |
| 3 | Poland | 3.3 |
| 3 | Slovenia | 3.1 |
| 5 | Greece | 2.9 |
| 5 | Spain | 2.9 |

=== Team Game highs ===
| Department | Name | Total | Opponent |
|---|---|---|---|
| Points | Spain | 99 | Israel |
| Rebounds | Germany | 52 | Italy |
| Assists | Russia | 23 | Croatia |
| Steals | Spain | 13 | Portugal |
| Blocks | Spain | 8 | Germany |
| Field goal percentage | Lithuania | 62.5% (35/56) | Czech Republic |
| 3-point field goal percentage | Lithuania | 61.9% (13/21) | Czech Republic |
| Free throw percentage | Portugal | 100% (3/3) | Spain |
| Turnovers | Portugal | 24 | Spain |

== Awards ==
2007 FIBA EuroBasket champions

Russia
1st title

2007 FIBA EuroBasket MVP: Andrei Kirilenko ( Russia)

All-Tournament Team
(Spain) José Calderón
(Lithuania) Ramūnas Šiškauskas
(Russia) Andrei Kirilenko (MVP)
(Germany) Dirk Nowitzki
(Spain) Pau Gasol

== Final standings ==
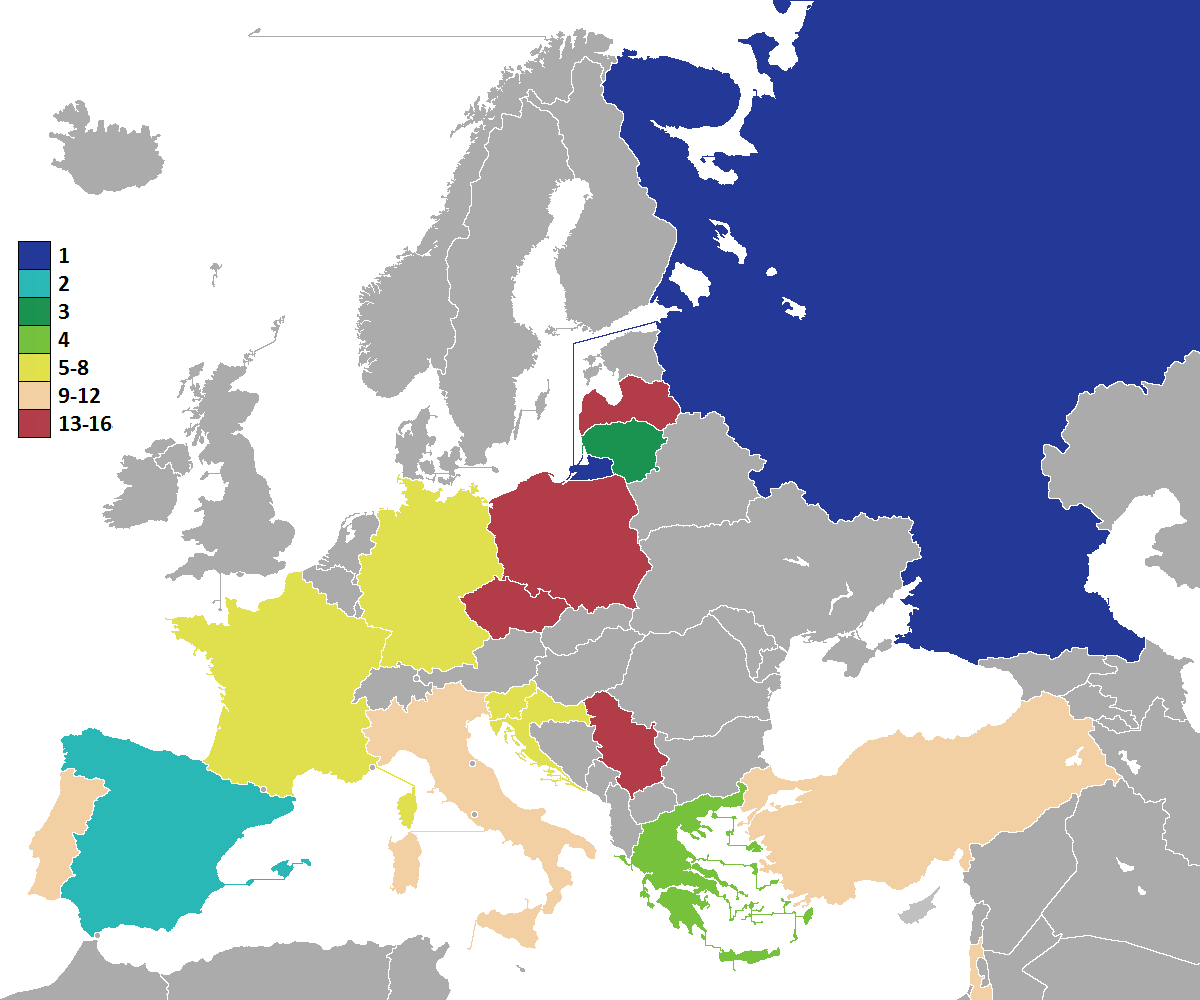
Results

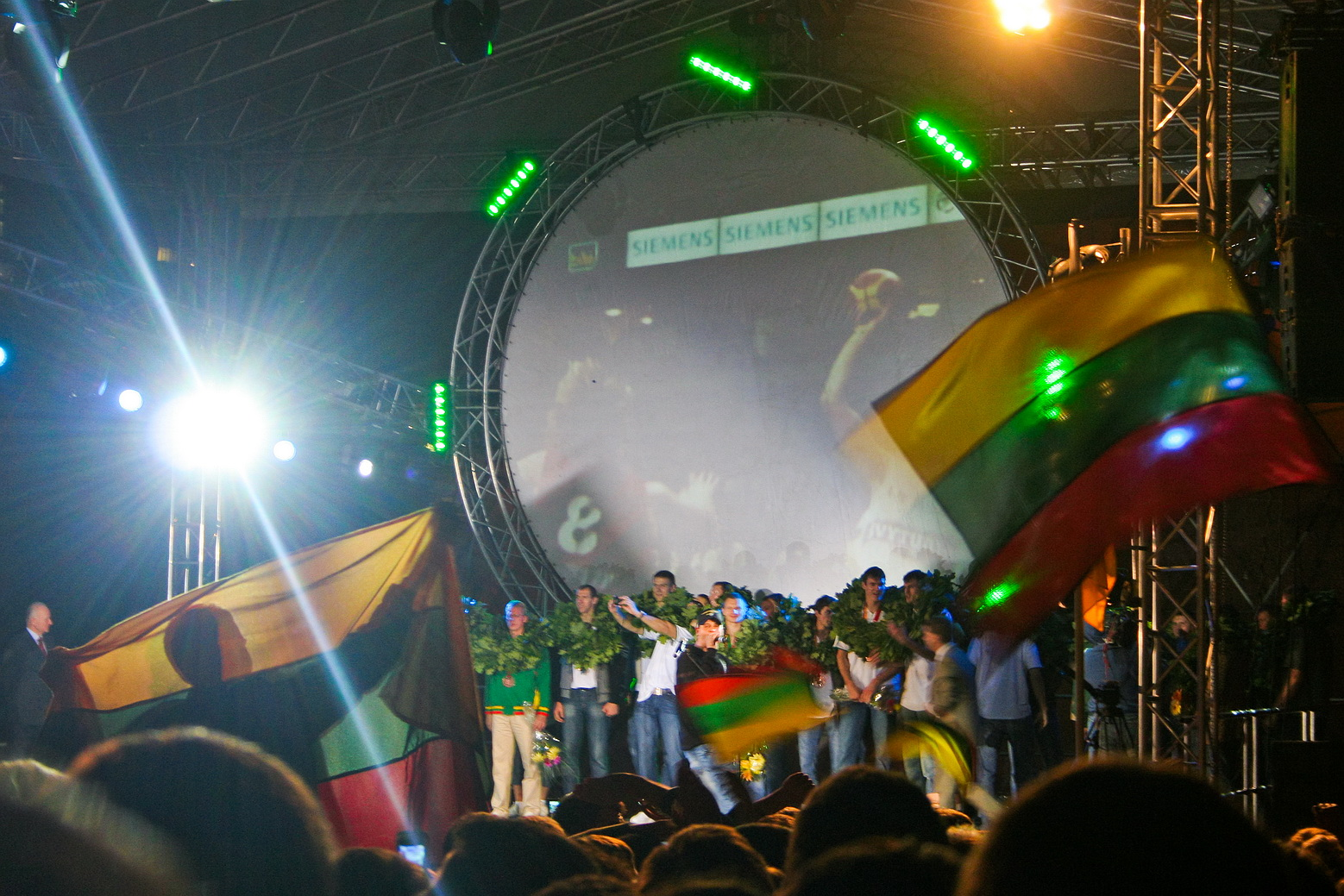
Lithuania celebrated the bronze

| Qualified for the 2008 Summer Olympics |
| Qualified for the 2008 Summer Olympics as World Champion |
| Qualified for the 2008 Olympic Qualifying Tournament |

| Rank | Team | Record |
|---|---|---|
| 1st place, gold medalist(s) | Russia | 8–1 |
| 2nd place, silver medalist(s) | Spain | 7–2 |
| 3rd place, bronze medalist(s) | Lithuania | 8–1 |
| 4 | Greece | 5–4 |
| 5 | Germany | 5–4 |
| 6 | Croatia | 3–6 |
| 7 | Slovenia | 6–3 |
| 8 | France | 4–5 |
| 9 | Italy | 2–4 |
| 9 | Portugal | 2–4 |
| 11 | Israel | 2–4 |
| 11 | Turkey | 1–5 |
| 13 | Czech Republic | 0–3 |
| 13 | Latvia | 1–2 |
| 13 | Poland | 0–3 |
| 13 | Serbia | 0–3 |

| 1st | 2nd | 3rd | 4th |
| Russia Nikita Shabalkin; Jon Robert Holden; Sergei Bykov; Andrei Kirilenko; Nikita Morgunov; Petr Samoylenko; Victor Khryapa; Zakhar Pashutin; Sergei Monia; Anton Ponkrashov; Aleksey Savrasenko; Nikolay Padius | Spain Pau Gasol; Rudy Fernández; Carlos Cabezas; Juan Carlos Navarro; José Calderón; Felipe Reyes; Carlos Jiménez; Sergio Rodríguez; Berni Rodríguez; Marc Gasol; Álex Mumbrú; Jorge Garbajosa | Lithuania Rimantas Kaukėnas; Giedrius Gustas; Jonas Mačiulis; Darjuš Lavrinovič; Ramūnas Šiškauskas; Darius Songaila; Simas Jasaitis; Linas Kleiza; Kšyštof Lavrinovič; Šarūnas Jasikevičius; Paulius Jankūnas; Robertas Javtokas | Greece Theo Papaloukas; Ioannis Bourousis; Nikos Zisis; Vassilis Spanoulis; Panagiotis Vasilopoulos; Michalis Pelekanos; Nikos Chatzivrettas; Dimos Dikoudis; Kostas Tsartsaris; Dimitris Diamantidis; Lazaros Papadopoulos; Michalis Kakiouzis |

== FIBA broadcasting rights ==
- Bosnia and Herzegovina: BHRT
- Bulgaria: BNT
- Croatia: HRT
- Cyprus: RIK 2
- Czech Republic: Czech Television
- France: Sport+ / Canal+
- Germany: DSF
- Greece: ERT
- Israel: Sport 5/Channel 10
- Italy: RAI
- Latvia: TV3 Latvia
- Lithuania: TV3 Lithuania
- Philippines: Basketball TV
- Poland: Polsat
- Portugal: RTP
- Russia: RTR Sport
- Romania: Sport.ro
- Serbia: RTS
- Spain: LaSexta
- Slovenia: RTV Slovenija
- Turkey: NTV
- Ukraine: Megasport / Sport 1 Ukraine
