= José Calderón (basketball) =

Spanish basketball player (born 1981)

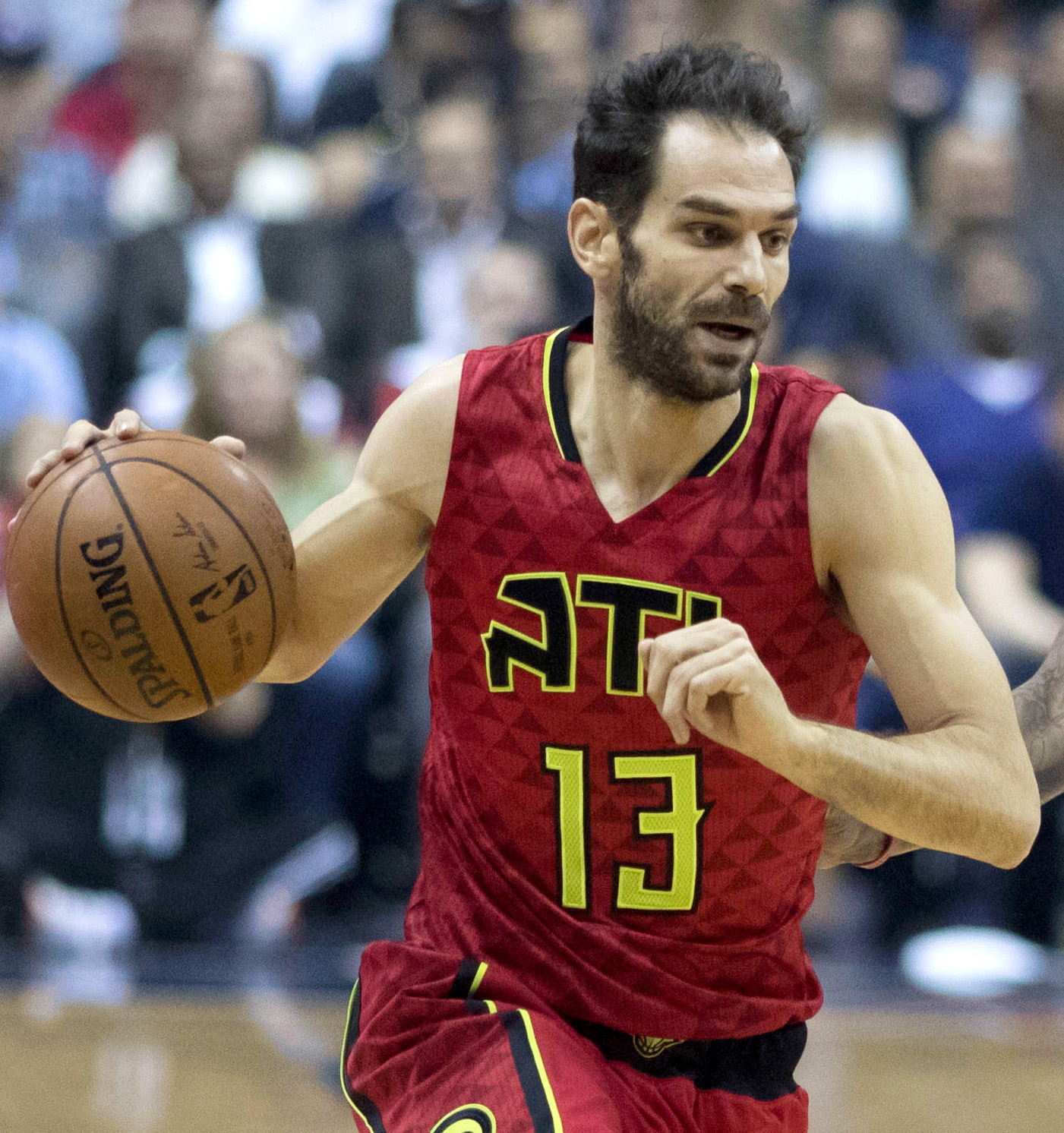
- Calderón with the Atlanta Hawks in 2017

Cleveland Cavaliers
- Title: Assistant general manager
- League: NBA

Personal information
- Born: September 28, 1981 (age 45) Villanueva de la Serena, Spain
- Listed height: 6 ft 3 in (1.91 m)
- Listed weight: 200 lb (91 kg)

Career information
- NBA draft: 2003: undrafted
- Playing career: 1998–2019
- Position: Point guard
- Number: 8, 3, 5, 13, 81

Career history
- 1998–1999: Diputación Foral Alava
- 1999–2001: Lucentum Alicante
- 2001–2002: Fuenlabrada
- 2002–2005: Tau Cerámica
- 2005–2013: Toronto Raptors
- 2013: Detroit Pistons
- 2013–2014: Dallas Mavericks
- 2014–2016: New York Knicks
- 2016–2017: Los Angeles Lakers
- 2017: Atlanta Hawks
- 2017–2018: Cleveland Cavaliers
- 2018–2019: Detroit Pistons

Career highlights
- Spanish King's Cup winner (2004); All-Spanish League Team (2005); LEB Oro champion (2000); NBA records: Highest free throw percentage in a season: 98.1%

Career NBA statistics
- Points: 7,921 (8.9 ppg)
- Rebounds: 2,148 (2.4 rpg)
- Assists: 5,148 (5.8 apg)
- Stats at NBA.com
- Stats at Basketball Reference
Medals
Men's basketball
Representing Spain
Olympic Games
Silver medal – second place	2008 Beijing	Team
Silver medal – second place	2012 London	Team
Bronze medal – third place	2016 Rio de Janeiro	Team
FIBA World Cup
Gold medal – first place	2006 Japan
EuroBasket
Gold medal – first place	2011 Lithuania
Silver medal – second place	2003 Sweden
Silver medal – second place	2007 Spain
Bronze medal – third place	2013 Slovenia
FIBA Under-19 Basketball World Cup
Gold medal – first place	1999 Portugal	U19 Team
FIBA Europe Under-20 Championship
Bronze medal – third place	2000 Macedonia	U20 Team
FIBA Europe Under-18 Championship
Gold medal – first place	1998 Bulgaria	U18 Team

José Manuel Calderón Borrallo (Spanish pronunciation: [xoˈse kaldeˈɾon]; born September 28, 1981) is a Spanish basketball executive and former player who currently serves as an assistant general manager for the Cleveland Cavaliers of the National Basketball Association (NBA). He played professionally for 21 years including 14 seasons in the NBA, primarily with the Toronto Raptors with whom he set an NBA record for the highest free throw percentage in a season (98.1% in 2008-09). With the Spain national team, he won a FIBA World Cup title in 2006, two Olympic silver medals in 2008 and 2012, as well as a bronze medal at the 2016 Summer Olympics. He also won a EuroBasket title in 2011, two silver medals in 2003 and 2007 as well as a bronze in 2013. Calderón earned an All-EuroBasket Team selection in 2007.

== Early life and European career ==
José Calderón was born and raised in the town of Villanueva de la Serena, in Spain. His main inspiration for basketball came from his father, who used to play basketball for his hometown's team, Doncel La Serena. Calderón received an offer to play professional basketball after he won a junior team championship.

After playing for Diputación Foral Alava, Calderón joined Lucentum Alicante (Spanish Second Division) in 1999, and he led his team to the ACB (Spanish First Division). The team had to return to the second division because of fierce competition. This helped Calderón adapt to the competition, and catalyzed an improvement to his game.

In 2001, Calderón joined ACB team Fuenlabrada. He averaged 9.7 points, and 1.7 assists in 18.6 minutes per game, and shot 83.2% from the free throw line. By the end of the season, he joined the Spain national team. In 2002, he played for the senior Spain national team in the 2002 FIBA World Championship at Indianapolis, where his team ended up in fifth place.

After the summer, Calderón signed with TAU Vitoria. Calderon played three seasons with Tau Vitoria. His team won the Spanish Basketball King's Cup, and were also runners-up in both the Liga ACB (Spanish League) and the EuroLeague. In 2002–03, he averaged 7.5 points, 2.4 rebounds, 1.4 assists and 1.1 steals in the EuroLeague. In 2003–04, he averaged 7.2 points, 1.4 rebounds, 2.0 assists, and 1.1 steals in the EuroLeague. In 2004–05, he averaged 11.6 points, 3.4 rebounds, 2.6 assists and 1.5 steals in the EuroLeague.

== NBA career ==
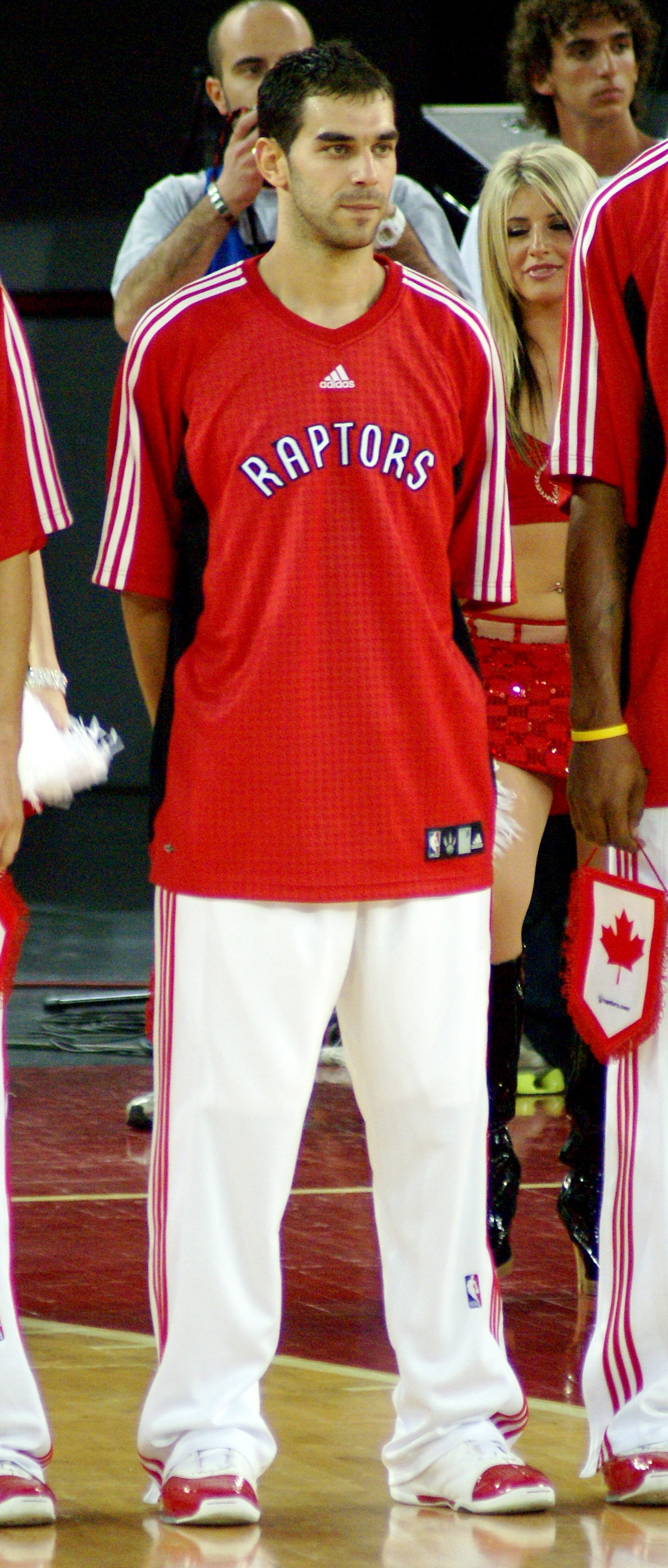
Calderón played mostly off the bench in his rookie season (2005–06) with the Raptors.

=== Toronto Raptors (2005–2013) ===
==== Rookie season ====
Calderón entered the NBA when former Raptors GM Rob Babcock persuaded the Spanish guard to sign with the Toronto Raptors on August 3, 2005. Known as a talented playmaker, he struggled with his shooting in his first year in the NBA. By the end of the 2005–06 season, he was ranked third among all rookies in assists with 4.5 per game. He finished the season with 64 played games, having started in 11 of them. He averaged 5.5 points, 4.5 assists, 2.2 rebounds and an assists-per-turnover ratio of 2.85.

==== 2006–07 season ====
Throughout the 2006–07 season, Calderón played primarily as backup to T. J. Ford, turning in solid numbers from the bench. As acknowledged by coach Sam Mitchell as well as his teammates, Calderón's form was instrumental to the Raptors' push for a playoff spot, and later, the Atlantic Division title. He ended his regular season with improved averages of 8.8 points and 5.1 assists per game and .525 in field goal percentage, even though he had less playing time compared to his rookie season. In the 2007 NBA Playoffs, Calderón played in all of Toronto's games in the series against the New Jersey Nets, but the Raptors were defeated 4–2. Calderón averaged 13.0 points and 5.3 assists per game in his first NBA playoff season.

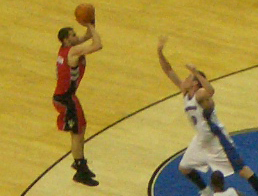
Calderón taking a jump shot in a 2006–07 game against the Washington Wizards

==== 2007–08 season ====
Toronto continued to deploy Ford and Calderón in tandem for the point guard position to good effect. Ford was injured for several games in November and December and the Spaniard stepped in with impressive performances. In three games against the Memphis Grizzlies, Cleveland Cavaliers and Chicago Bulls, Calderón provided 37 assists while committing only three turnovers. 14 games into the season, he was also leading the league in assist-to-turnover ratio with 5.67 to 1, but even so, he said: "But how I feel about the team right now is that we need T.J. Ford [for the next game]." 35 games into the season, the Spaniard increased the turnover ratio to 6.15 to 1, setting him on course to break an NBA record (he went to end the season as the league-leader with 5.38 to 1). He shot at least 50% on field goals, 40% on three-pointers, and 90% on free-throws, and is sometimes listed as a member of the NBA's 50–40–90 Club, even though he was sixteen free-throws shy of attaining the NBA league minimum number of makes in this category. By mid-season, he was touted as a possibility for making the All-Star reserve team. Even after Ford returned from injury for the final third of the campaign, Calderón was able to keep his place in the starting lineup. Ford had initially agreed to playing backup, but reportedly became frustrated at not being able to start. Calderón eventually asked the coaching staff to play Ford as starter instead, leading to widespread praise from the coaching staff, teammates, and fans. Given that he was going to become a free agent by the end of the campaign, there were even calls for Ford to be traded so that the team could be built around Calderón as point guard. By the end of the regular season, Calderón was fifth in the league for assists per game, and in the 2008 NBA Playoffs, Ford split the playing time with him about equally, with the two players combining for averages of 23.4 points and 13.6 assists per game. However, the Raptors were eliminated by the Orlando Magic in the first round four games to one.

==== 2008–09 season ====
On July 9, 2008, Calderón re-signed with the Raptors to a multi-year deal, reported to be worth $7.5 million to $8.5 million a season. With the departure of Ford to the Indiana Pacers, the Spaniard was slated to start the point guard position for the Raptors. At the same time, new acquisition Jermaine O'Neal formed the frontcourt with Bosh. However, 17 games into the season, Toronto fired head coach Sam Mitchell and the line-ups were constantly shuffled. By the end of 2008, the Raptors were 12–20, but with Calderón out for almost a month thereafter, the team slipped to 16–28. When Calderón returned to the Raptors lineup, he helped snap a seven-game losing streak with a 114–94 victory over Chicago, recording 23 points on 9-of-10 shooting and 10 assists. Not long after, he set the second-longest streak in NBA history for consecutive free throws made (87). On March 13, 2009, Calderón surpassed Alvin Williams' franchise record for career assists with 1795. On March 29, 2009, in a game against Chicago, he tied the franchise record for most assists in game with 19, and not long after, set an NBA record for highest free-throw percentage in a season, making 98.1% of his free throws in the season, missing only 3 of the 154 he took, overtaking Calvin Murphy’s record of 95.8% set in 1981. These records, however, were overshadowed by the Raptors rapidly falling out of the playoffs picture soon after the All-Star break, and the criticism Calderón faced for being unable to defend and play an up-tempo game. Toronto eventually finished with a 33–49 record, with the Spaniard leading the Eastern Conference in assists per game and the league in free throw percentage and assist-to-turnover ratio.

==== 2009–10 season ====
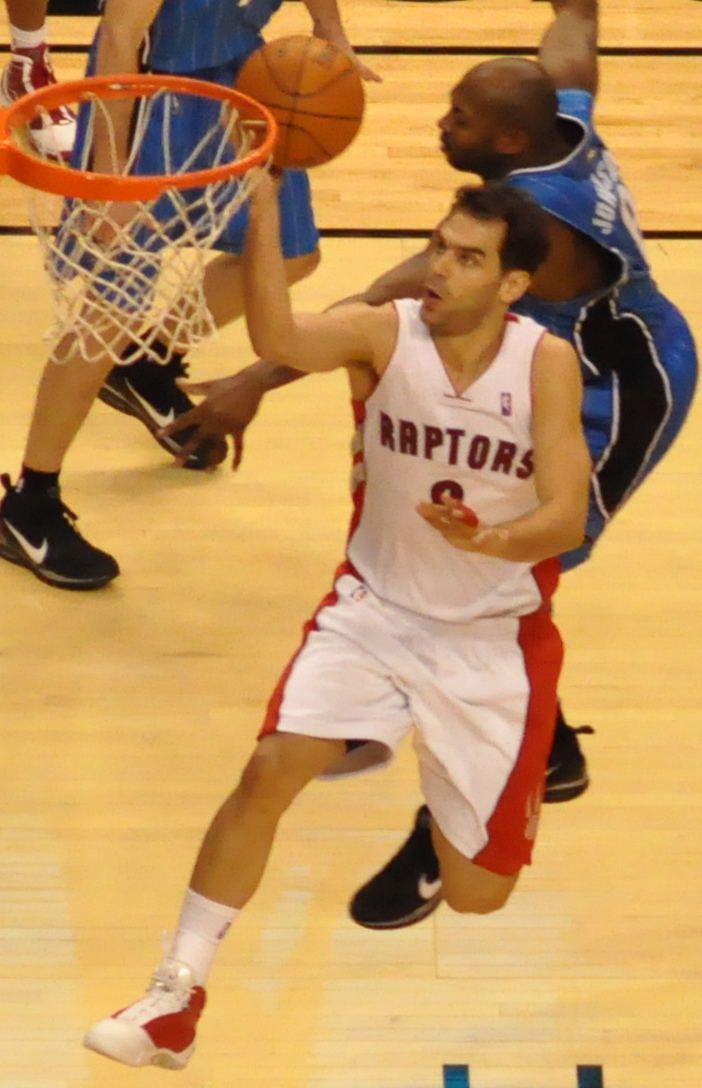
Going for a layup against the Orlando Magic in 2009

The Raptors underwent a significant roster overhaul in the preseason, such as bringing Jarrett Jack from Indiana to play as Calderón's back-up and point forward Hedo Türkoğlu to share in ball-handling duties. With a third of the season gone, the Spaniard picked up an injury that put him out for 12 games, resulting in Jack holding on to the starting spot even upon the former's return, paralleling the Ford-Calderón scenario in 2007–08. Still, the pair combined well and helped bring the Raptors to a 21–20 record at the mid-season mark.

During the early stages of the 2010 offseason, the Raptors had a deal in place to send Calderon and Reggie Evans to the Charlotte Bobcats for Tyson Chandler and Boris Diaw. However, Michael Jordan, the owner of the Bobcats, nixed the deal right before it was finalized, which allowed Calderon to remain with the Raptors.

==== 2010–11 season ====
Calderón was ranked fifth in assists per game (8.9) at the conclusion of the regular season.

==== 2011–12 season ====
On February 12, 2012, Calderón scored a career high 30 points in a 94–92 loss against the Lakers. Calderón led the league in assists per turnover (4.5) for the third time in five years at the conclusion of the regular season.

=== Detroit Pistons (2013) ===
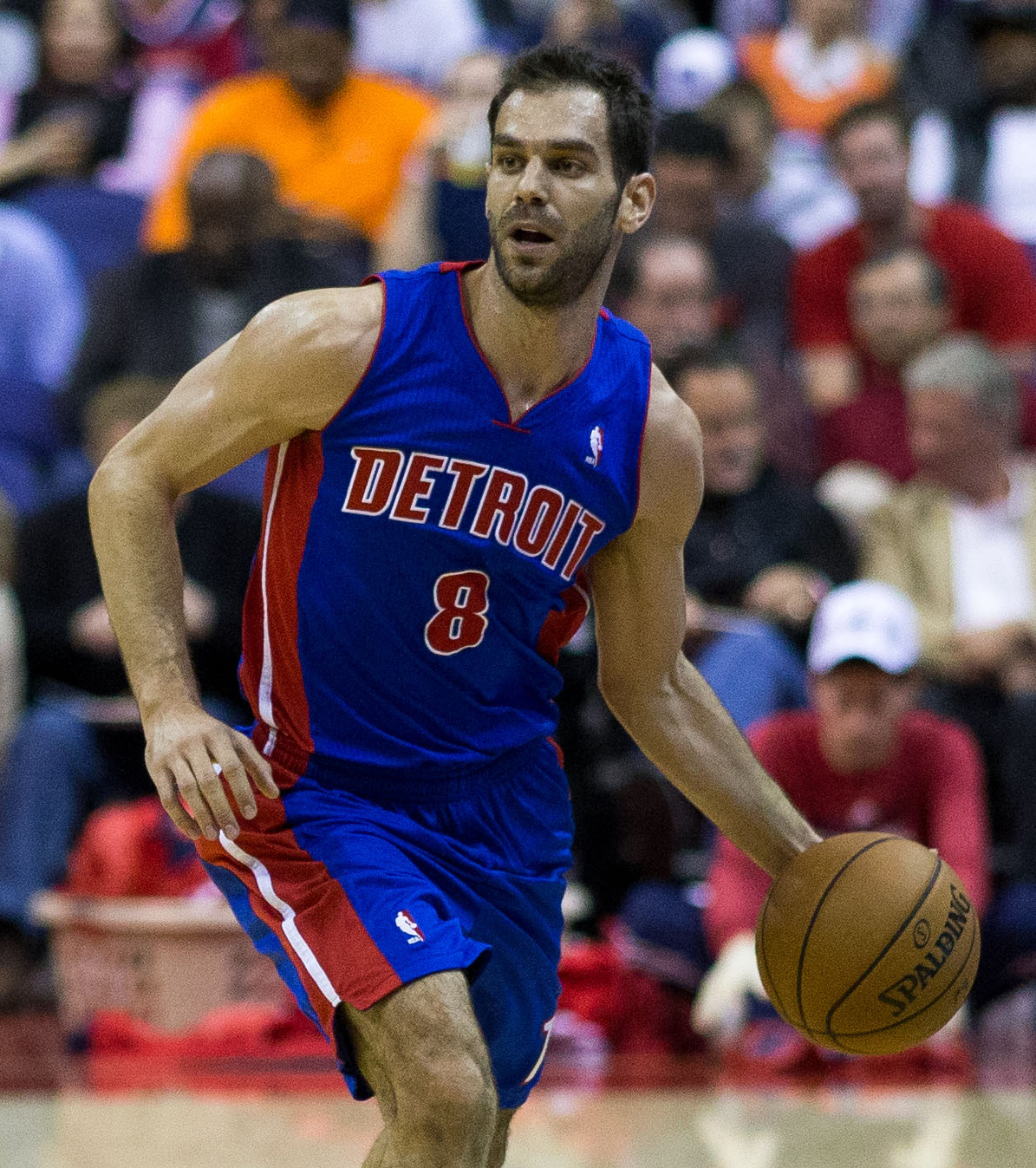
Calderón with the Pistons in 2013

On January 30, 2013, Calderón was traded to the Detroit Pistons in a three-team trade which sent Tayshaun Prince, Austin Daye, and Ed Davis to the Memphis Grizzlies and Rudy Gay and Hamed Haddadi to Toronto. He became the starting point guard for the Pistons, and in just his fourth game for the franchise, he recorded 23 points and 10 assists in the 105–100 win over the Milwaukee Bucks.

Calderón finished the season averaging 11.3 points and 7.1 assists per game. He also led the league in three-point shooting percentage (.461) and was second in assists per turnover (4.1).

=== Dallas Mavericks (2013–2014) ===
On July 11, 2013, Calderón signed with the Dallas Mavericks to a reported four-year, $28 million contract. He became the Mavericks lead point guard, starting in 81 games. He had his best game on December 20, 2013, against his former team, the Toronto Raptors, where he recorded 23 points and 9 assists. Calderón finished the season averaging 11.4 points and 4.7 assists per game.

=== New York Knicks (2014–2016) ===
On June 25, 2014, Calderón, along with Shane Larkin, Wayne Ellington, Samuel Dalembert and two 2014 second-round picks, was traded to the New York Knicks in exchange for Tyson Chandler and Raymond Felton. In the process, he re-joined former Raptor teammate Andrea Bargnani. After a preseason injury kept him on sidelines for the first 13 games of the season, he made his Knicks debut on November 22, 2014, as he recorded 3 points, 3 rebounds, 3 assists and 2 steals in the 91–83 win over the Philadelphia 76ers.

On March 23, 2015, Calderón was ruled out for the rest of the season after undergoing a procedure on his strained left Achilles tendon.

On March 13, 2016, he made a game-winning three-point shot with 0.2 seconds left on the clock to defeat the Los Angeles Lakers.

=== Los Angeles Lakers (2016–2017) ===
On June 22, 2016, Calderón was traded, along with Jerian Grant and Robin Lopez, to the Chicago Bulls in exchange for Derrick Rose, Justin Holiday and a 2017 second-round draft pick. On July 7, he was traded again, this time with two future second-round picks to the Los Angeles Lakers in exchange for the rights to Ater Majok. On December 5, 2016, he was ruled out for two to four weeks with a right hamstring strain. On February 27, 2017, he was waived by the Lakers.

After being waived by the Lakers, Calderón was set to join the Golden State Warriors. However, after Kevin Durant suffered a possible season-ending knee injury, the Warriors felt they needed a forward instead of a point guard to fill Durant's role. The Warriors still honored their agreement with Calderón, signing him on March 1, 2017 before waiving him later that day. While he was only with the team for two hours, the Warriors agreed to pay Calderón the $415,000 he would have earned if he had been on the team for the rest of the season.

=== Atlanta Hawks (2017) ===
On March 4, 2017, Calderón was claimed off waivers by the Atlanta Hawks.

=== Cleveland Cavaliers (2017–2018) ===
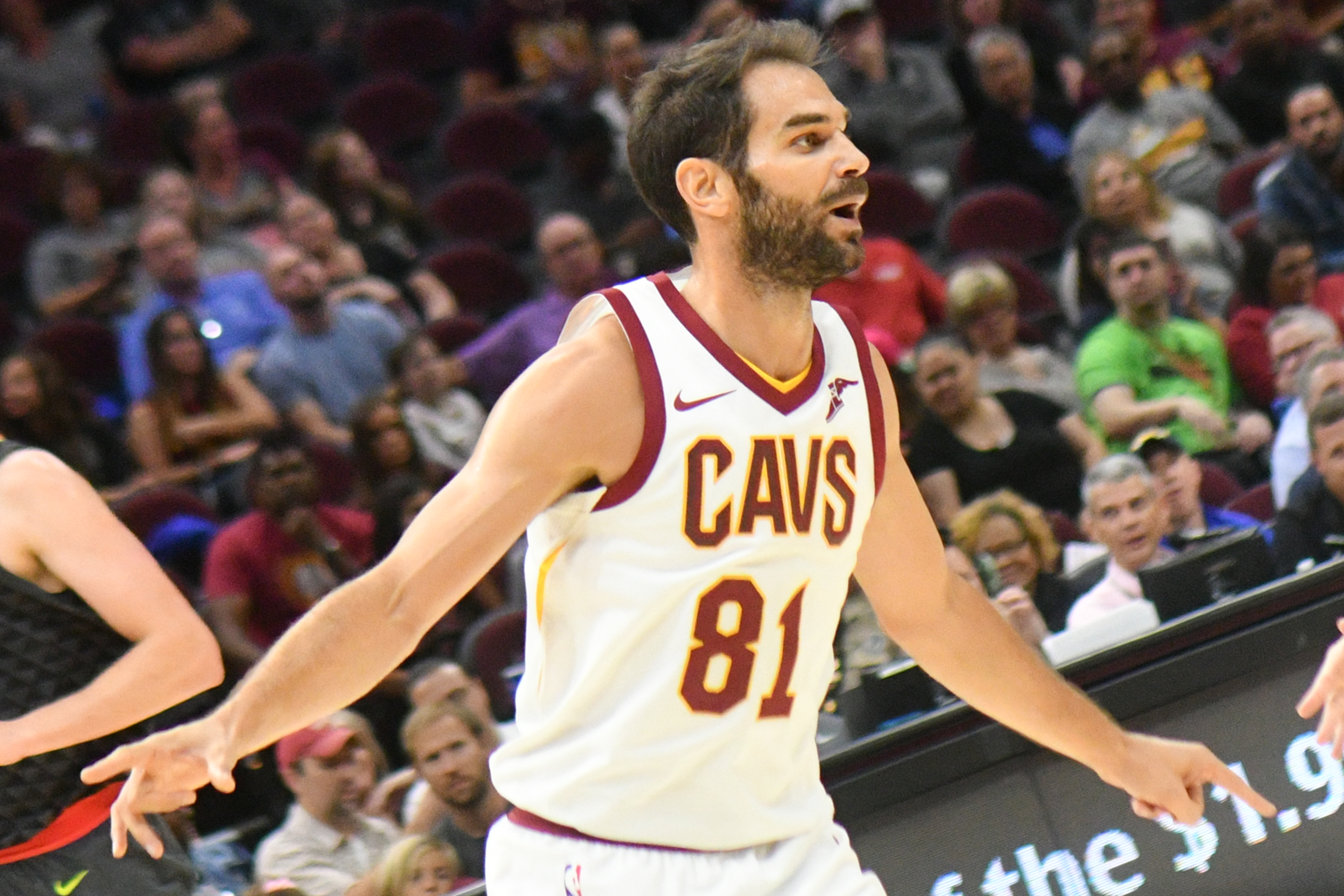
Calderón with the Cavaliers in 2017

On July 10, 2017, Calderón signed with the Cleveland Cavaliers. On April 3, 2018, Calderón scored a season-high 19 points, and recorded 4 assists and 4 rebounds, during a 112–106 win over the Toronto Raptors.

The Cavaliers eventually made it to the 2018 NBA Finals, before losing 4–0 to the Golden State Warriors.

=== Return to Detroit (2018–2019) ===
On July 7, 2018, Calderón signed with the Detroit Pistons.

== Executive career ==
On November 4, 2019, the National Basketball Players Association (NBPA) announced that Calderón had joined them as the special assistant to the executive director for the 2019–20 NBA season.

On January 14, 2022, Calderón was hired by the Cleveland Cavaliers as a special advisor to the front office.

On September 18, 2026, Calderón was promoted to the role of assistant general manager.

== National team career ==
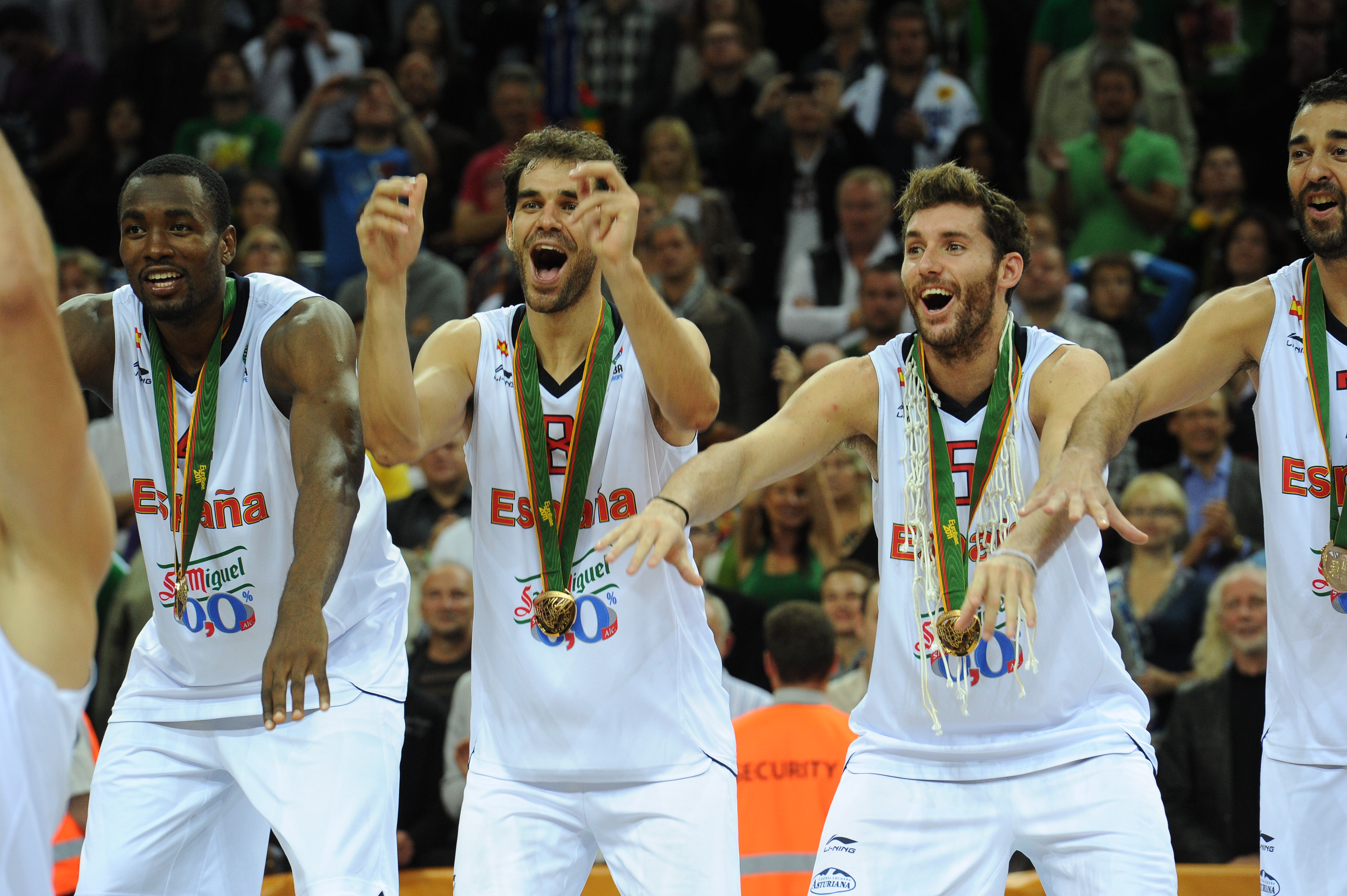
Calderón (second from left) with Spain at Eurobasket 2011, which Spain won

Calderón enjoyed a successful international career. When he played for Spain's national youth team, he won the gold medal at the 1998 FIBA Europe Under-18 Championship, as well as the bronze medal at the 2000 FIBA Europe Under-20 Championship. As his career advanced, the point guard began appearing for the Spain national team. Calderón was part of the Spain national team which finished fifth at the 2002 FIBA World Championship and second at the 2003 EuroBasket. He was later named the team captain during the 2004 Summer Olympics, and on September 3, 2006, Calderón and his Spanish squad defeated Greece, and won the 2006 FIBA World Championship, along with future Raptors teammate, Jorge Garbajosa. In 2007 EuroBasket, Calderón and Garbajosa again featured for the Spanish team. In the knockout stages, Calderón recorded a game-high 17 points as Spain defeated Germany 83–55 in the quarterfinals. In the semifinals, Calderón scored 18 points in Spain's defeat of Greece. The Spaniard led his team in points again in the final, but Spain lost 60–59 to Russia. In the 2008 Summer Olympics, Calderón was part of the squad that won the silver medal, but was injured and therefore could not play in the semifinal and the final games. He averaged 7.3 points per game in the tournament. Calderón won another silver medal at the 2012 Summer Olympics. He also made Spain's squad for the 2016 Summer Olympics, but played only sparingly.

At the end of the Olympics, he announced his retirement from the national team.

== Player profile ==
Calderón is one of the best free throw shooters in the NBA, having set an NBA record for free throw shooting (98.1%) in 2008–09 with 151 of 154 attempts. Known as a highly efficient player, Calderon's 2007–08 season would have made him one of eight players in NBA history to shoot at or over 50% on field goals, 40% on three-point field goals, and 90% on free throws for a full season, but he did not have enough free throws made to qualify.

== Career statistics ==
Legend
GP	Games played	GS	Games started	MPG	Minutes per game
FG%	Field-goal percentage	3P%	3-point field-goal percentage	FT%	Free-throw percentage
RPG	Rebounds per game	APG	Assists per game	SPG	Steals per game
BPG	Blocks per game	PPG	Points per game	PIR	Performance index rating
**Bold**	Career high

*	Led league
‡	NBA record

=== NBA ===
==== Regular season ====
Year	Team	GP	GS	MPG	FG%	3P%	FT%	RPG	APG	SPG	BPG	PPG
2005–06	Toronto	64	11	23.2	.423	.163	.848	2.2	4.5	0.7	0.1	5.5
2006–07	Toronto	77	11	21.0	.521	.333	.818	1.7	5.0	0.8	0.1	8.7
2007–08	Toronto	**82***	56	30.3	.519	.429	.908	2.9	8.3	1.1	0.1	11.2
2008–09	Toronto	68	68	**34.3**	.497	.406	.981‡	2.9	**8.9**	1.1	0.1	**12.8**
2009–10	Toronto	68	39	26.7	.482	.398	.798	2.1	5.9	0.7	0.1	10.3
2010–11	Toronto	68	55	30.9	.440	.365	.854	3.0	**8.9**	**1.2**	0.1	9.8
2011–12	Toronto	53	53	33.9	.457	.371	.882	3.0	8.8	0.9	0.1	10.5
2012–13	Toronto	45	30	28.3	.470	.429*	.904	2.4	7.4	0.6	0.1	11.1
2012–13	Detroit	28	28	31.7	**.527**	**.520***	.893	2.5	6.6	1.1	0.1	11.6
2013–14	Dallas	81	**81**	30.5	.456	.449	.825	2.4	4.7	0.9	0.1	11.4
2014–15	New York	42	42	30.2	.415	.415	.906	3.0	4.7	0.7	0.0	9.1
2015–16	New York	72	72	28.1	.459	.414	.875	**3.2**	4.1	0.9	0.1	7.6
2016–17	L.A. Lakers	24	11	12.2	.416	.353	**1.000**	1.7	2.1	0.3	0.0	3.3
2016–17	Atlanta	17	2	14.5	.404	.267	.875	1.9	2.2	0.2	0.0	3.6
2017–18	Cleveland	57	32	16.0	.503	.464	.800	1.5	2.1	0.5	0.0	4.5
2018–19	Detroit	49	0	12.9	.375	.246	.818	1.2	2.3	0.3	0.1	2.3
Career		895	591	26.4	.472	.407	.873	2.4	5.8	0.8	0.1	8.9

==== Playoffs ====
Year	Team	GP	GS	MPG	FG%	3P%	FT%	RPG	APG	SPG	BPG	PPG
2007	Toronto	6	1	24.3	**.507**	.250	.833	1.7	5.3	**0.8**	0.0	**13.0**
2008	Toronto	5	0	24.0	.440	.476	**1.000**	**3.6**	**7.0**	0.2	0.0	11.8
2014	Dallas	7	**7**	**27.3**	.462	**.478**	**1.000**	1.3	4.4	0.1	0.0	10.3
2017	Atlanta	6	0	12.5	.478	.333	-	1.3	2.2	0.3	**0.2**	4.3
2018	Cleveland	**13**	3	8.0	.346	.222	**1.000**	0.8	0.7	0.4	0.0	1.8
2019	Detroit	3	0	3.3	-	-	-	0.0	1.7	0.3	0.0	0.0
Career		40	11	16.2	.459	.372	.929	1.4	3.1	0.4	0.0	6.5

=== EuroLeague ===
Year	Team	GP	GS	MPG	FG%	3P%	FT%	RPG	APG	SPG	BPG	PPG	PIR
2002–03	Tau Cerámica	17	6	21.5	.477	.406	**.875**	2.4	1.4	1.1	0.0	7.5	8.2
2003–04	Tau Cerámica	19	10	21.6	.470	.405	.830	1.4	2.0	1.1	**0.2**	7.2	7.6
2004–05	Tau Cerámica	**22**	**17**	**26.8**	**.494**	**.421**	.841	**3.4**	**2.6**	**1.5**	0.0	**11.6**	**12.9**
Career		58	33	23.5	.484	.414	.844	2.5	2.1	1.2	0.1	9.0	9.8

== Personal life ==
On March 2, 2007, the Raptors announced that Calderón had been named a Right To Play Athlete Ambassador. Right To Play is an athlete-driven international humanitarian organization that uses sport and play as a tool for the development of children and youth in the most disadvantaged areas of the world. As part of the program, Calderón pledged $1000 for every assist he recorded in a home game against the Chicago Bulls on November 26, 2007. He ended the game with 14 assists.

Calderon is a co-owner of an organic pig farm.

He is married to Ana Hurtado. The couple welcomed their first child, Manuel, in Villanueva de la Serena on May 23, 2010.

== See also ==
- List of National Basketball Association career 3-point field goal percentage leaders
- Toronto Raptors accomplishments and records
- List of European basketball players in the United States
