= Jordan Stagmiller =

American soccer player (born 1992)

Personal information
- Full name: Jordan Theodore Stagmiller
- Date of birth: November 8, 1992 (age 33)
- Place of birth: Phoenix, Arizona, United States
- Height: 6 ft 0 in (1.83 m)
- Position: Goalkeeper

Youth career
- 2000–2011: Sereno Soccer Club

College career
| Years | Team | Apps | (Gls) |
| 2011–2015 | St. John's Red Storm | 34 | (0) |

Senior career*
| Years | Team | Apps | (Gls) |
| 2012-2013 | Jersey Express | 5 | (0) |
| 2014-2015 | Greek American AA | 10 | (0) |
| 2016-2018 | Arizona United | 6 | (0) |
| 2017-2019 | New York Pancyprian-Freedoms | 28 | (0) |
- * Club domestic league appearances and goals as of September 28, 2016

Jordan Theodore Stagmiller (born November 8, 1992) is an American soccer player from Phoenix, Arizona.

== Career ==
=== College and amateur ===
Stagmiller played youth soccer for Sereno Soccer Club in Phoenix, Arizona. He was named Sereno Soccer Club's Player of the Year in 2011. His club team, Sereno 93' White, won three Arizona State Cups as well as the San Diego Surf Cup in 2010. Stagmiller played high school soccer at North Canyon High School for one season between 2010 and 2011. While at North Canyon he was named Desert Valley Region Player of the Year as well as being named to the Arizona Republic's 1st Team All-Arizona and 1st Team All-5A. Stagmiller played college soccer at St. John's University between 2011 and 2015, including two red-shirted seasons in 2012 and 2013. While with the Red Storm Stagmiller earned Big East Conference Goalkeeper of the Week on three occasions and won ECAC Goalkeeper of the Week twice. He appeared for Premier Development League side Jersey Express in 2012, playing 1 season for the New Jersey side. In 2014 Stagmiller won the National Amateur Cup National Championship with the Greek American AA, defeating Guadalajara FC 4–2 in the final.

=== Professional ===
Stagmiller signed his first professional contract for United Soccer League side Arizona United on March 29, 2016. He made his professional debut on June 11, 2016, in a 2–0 win against Orange County Blues. Stagmiller finished his first professional season making 17 saves, obtaining 1 shutout, receiving 1 yellow card and accumulating a 2-2-2 record in 6 matches for United. After his USL career ended Stagmiller joined the New York Pancyprian-Freedoms for two seasons in the Cosmopolitan Soccer League, winning a league title in 2018–2019.

== Honors ==
St. John's Red Storm

- 2011 Big East Conference Men's Soccer Tournament: 2011
- John DaSilva Memorial Award: 2013

Greek Americans AA

- National Amateur Cup: 2014

== Personal life ==
Stagmiller was raised in Phoenix, Arizona to Ted and Shawna Stagmiller. He has 3 sisters. He attended North Canyon High School and St. John's University, where he graduated with a degree in Sports Management in 2015. He is married and has 2 kids.
