= Paradise Valley Unified School District =

School district in Maricopa County, Arizona

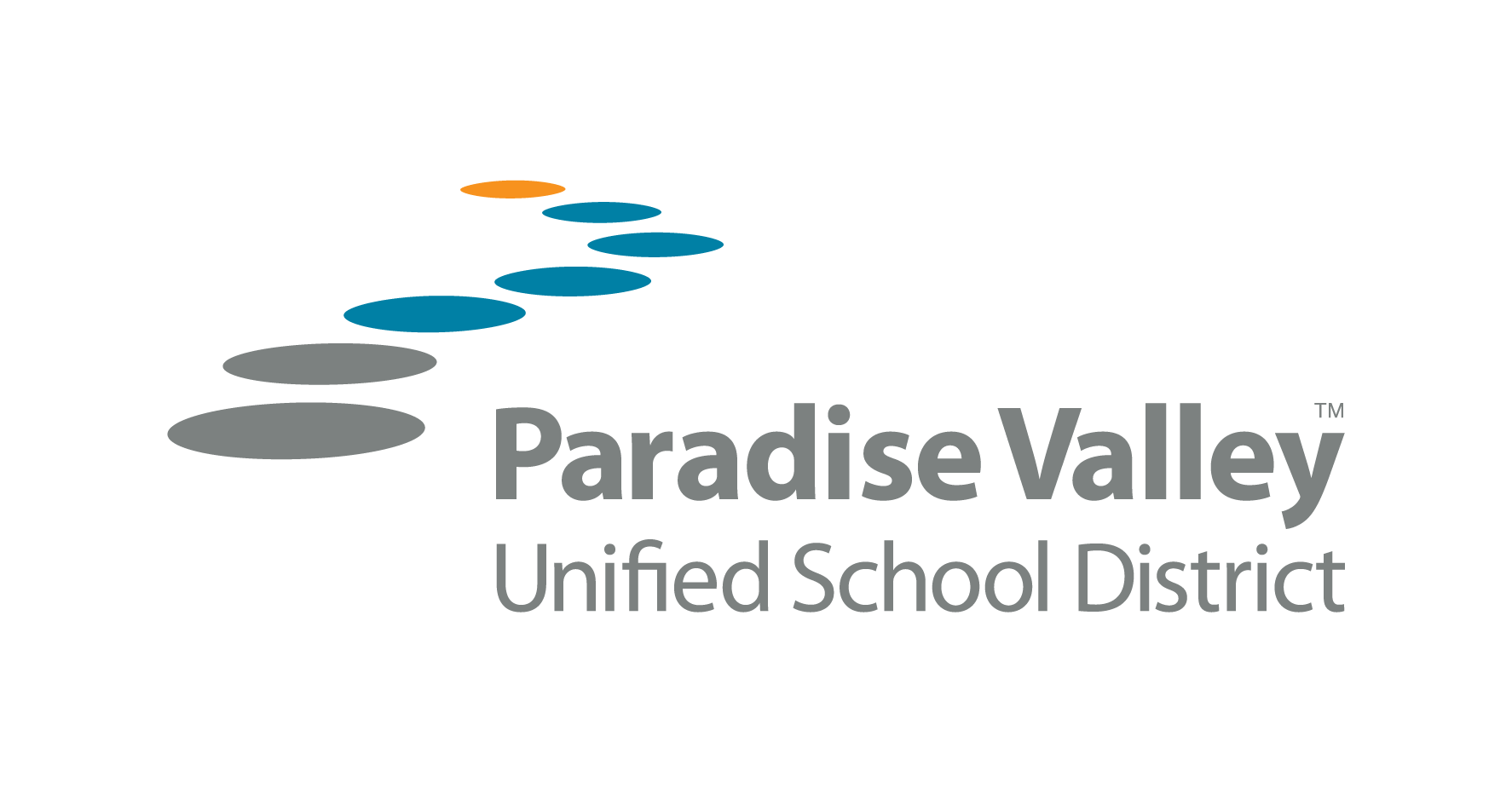

Address
- (District office) 15002 N 32nd Street Phoenix, Arizona; United States

District information
- Motto: A Journey of Excellence
- Established: 1913 (Unified 1976)
- Superintendent: Dr. C. Todd Cummings

Students and staff
- Students: 32,000

Other information
- Website: Official website

Paradise Valley Unified School District #69 (PVSchools) is a school district serving the northeast part of Phoenix, Arizona (including the Paradise Valley urban village), and Scottsdale, Arizona. The district serves students in kindergarten through grade 12 with 30 elementary schools (free, full-day kindergarten through grade six), one K-8 school, seven middle schools (grades seven and eight), five high schools (grades nine through 12), two alternative schools and a K-12 online school, PVOnline. The district offers a variety of education choice programs, including K-12 International Baccalaureate, AVID, Core Knowledge, S.T.E.M. (science, technology, engineering and mathematics), CREST (Center for Research, Engineering, Science and Technology), Digital Learning Center, fine arts, The North Valley Arts Academies, career & technical education, Advanced Placement, before- after-school programs, sports and extracurricular activities for all ages. The district also provides gifted and special education programs.

The district is located in 98-square miles of northeast Phoenix and a portion of north Scottsdale. This area extends from 7th Avenue to Pima Road and is generally bordered on the south by Northern Avenue and the north by Jomax Road. With 32,000 students, it is the seventh-largest school district in Arizona.

== History ==
In 1913, local residents opened Sunnyside School on Cactus Road east of 32nd Street. The one-room schoolhouse, which served 21 girls and 13 boys its first year, was the predecessor to the Paradise Valley School District. In 1918, the school moved to a barn located at 32nd Street and Greenway. The building had a wood-burning stove and no indoor plumbing but had an outdoor facility. Due to failure to secure irrigation rights, many families left the area in the 1920s, resulting in no record of school from 1920 to 1923. In 1930, Edwin Nesbet donated land for a new campus for Sunnyside. Sunnyside continued to be the solo school for the district until the late 1940s, when electricity was made available in the area. Paradise Valley High School was constructed in 1957, which eliminated the need for 10th grade students to attend the Phoenix Union High School. That same year, Paradise Valley High School District was formed. To prepare for growth, the district constructed four new schools in the 1960s, thirteen in the 1970s, eleven in the 1980s, ten in the 1990s and nine more since 2000 as of 2020. In July 1976, the separate high school and elementary school districts combined to form the Paradise Valley Unified School District. In 1991, the 1930s Sunnyside campus, which had been expanded in the 1950s, was replaced with Greenway Middle School.

=== 2026 antisemitism complaint ===
In October 2026, the Anti-Defamation League (ADL) and law firm Reed Smith filed a federal civil rights complaint with the U.S. Department of Education's Office for Civil Rights, alleging that Paradise Valley Unified School District failed to adequately address antisemitic harassment of a Jewish student at Desert Shadows Middle School in Scottsdale. The complaint alleged that, between April and May 2026, the 14-year-old student was subjected to antisemitic slurs, Nazi salutes and threats by fellow students, and was physically assaulted near the end of the school year. It further alleged that school administrators minimized reports of the harassment and failed to take adequate disciplinary action.

The district disputed the allegations of inaction, stating that each reported incident had been immediately investigated and addressed, and that disciplinary action had been taken in accordance with district policy. It also said that Desert Shadows students had participated in presentations about antisemitism and respectful behavior, and that additional educational efforts would continue.

The complaint requested a federal investigation and remedies including mandatory antisemitism training and independent oversight of the district's civil rights policies. The student subsequently transferred to another school district. The filing was an administrative civil rights complaint, not a lawsuit; as of October 30, 2026, the Department of Education had not confirmed whether it had opened an investigation.

== Elementary schools ==
- Boulder Creek Est. 1996
- Cactus View Est. 1992
- Campo Bello Est. 1960 (reconstructed 2019)
- Copper Canyon Est. 1993
- Desert Cove Est. 1964 (reconstructed 2007)
- Desert Shadows Est. 1972
- Desert Trails Est. 1996
- Eagle Ridge Est. 1984
- Echo Mountain Primary (Pre-K-3) Est. 1980 (originally Echo Mountain Elementary K-6)
  - The U.S. Department of Education gave the school the recognition award for the 1989-1990 school year.
- Echo Mountain Intermediate (4-6) Est. 2002 (constructed 1987 as expansion building for Echo Mountain Elementary)
- Fireside Est. 2012
- Grayhawk Est. 1998
- Hidden Hills Est. 1988
- Indian Bend Est. 1972
- Larkspur Est. 1960s (reconstructed 2012)
- Liberty Est. 1977 (reconstructed 2002-03)
- Mercury Mine Est. 1976
- North Ranch Est. 1987
- Palomino Primary (Pre-K-3) Est. 1970s (reconstructed 1987)
  - The U.S. Department of Education gave Palomino School the recognition award for the 1989-1990 school year.
- Palomino Intermediate (4-6) Est. 2002
- Pinnacle Peak Preparatory (K-8) Est. 2002
- Quail Run Est. 1988
- Roadrunner Est. 1991
- Sandpiper Est. 1979
- Sky Crossing Est. 2021
- Sonoran Sky Est. 1994
- Whispering Wind Est. 1995
- Wildfire Est. 2006

== K-8 ==
- Pinnacle Peak Preparatory

== Middle schools ==
- Desert Shadows Est. 1974
- Explorer Est. 1997
- Greenway Est. 1930 as Sunnyside School, current campus built in 1991
- Mountain Trail Est. 2002
- Shea Est. 1970 (reconstructed 1992)
- Sunrise Est. 1981

== High schools ==
- Horizon High School Est. 1980
- North Canyon High School Est. 1991
- Paradise Valley High School Est. 1957
- Pinnacle High School Est. 2000
- Shadow Mountain High School Est. 1974

== Alternative schools ==
- Roadrunner Est. 1960s as Roadrunner Elementary School
- Sweetwater Community School Est. 1979 as Sweetwater Elementary School

== K-12 Online school ==
- PVOnline

== Former schools ==
- Aire Libre Elementary Est. 1979 (closed 2019)
- Arrowhead Elementary Est. 1975 (closed 2019)
- Foothills Elementary Est. 1987 (closed 2014)
- Gold Dust Elementary (closed 2005) reopened as Cholla Complex
- Village Vista Elementary Est. 1980 (closed 2013)
- Vista Verde Est. 1989 (closed 2024)

== District site ==
- Paradise Valley Unified School District
