= North Canyon High School =

Public high school in Arizona, United States

Location
- 1700 E. Union Hills Drive; Phoenix, AZ; 33°39′24″N 112°02′36″W

Information
- Type: Public high school
- Established: 1991
- School district: Paradise Valley Unified School District
- Principal: Jorge Ontiveros
- Staff: 81.40 (FTE)
- Grades: 9–12
- Enrollment: 1,560 (2024–2025)
- Student to teacher ratio: 19.16
- Colors: Black and Purple
- Nickname: Rattlers
- Feeder schools: Vista Verde Middle School (partial), Mountain Trail Middle School (partial), Greenway Middle School (partial)
- Website: Official website

North Canyon High School (NCHS) is a nationally recognized public high school located in north central Phoenix, Arizona. It features an International Baccalaureate (IB) program.

Construction started in 1989, the campus was designed by Hickman, Schafer & Turley Architects Ltd. of Mesa. The campus opened in the 1991–1992 school year as Paradise Valley High School before PVHS moved into their remodeled school. It became North Canyon starting in the 1993–1994 school year. The first graduating class was the class of 1994.

The school's athletics teams are known as the Rattlers, and the school colors are purple and black.

== Academics ==
North Canyon features special programs in academics. In addition to its IB Diploma program, NCHS offers a variety of Advanced Placement classes, and many of its highest-ranking students have grade point averages above 4.0. Students have won a vast array of academic awards spanning from the sciences to literary honors. In the class of 2009, there were ten National Merit semi-finalists at North Canyon. North Canyon's Academic Decathlon team won the State Championship in 1995 and 1999, and placed fourth and fifth respectively in the national competition. In 2007, North Canyon was on Newsweek's list of top schools in the country, placing 837th out of thousands of schools.

== Athletics ==
The North Canyon Rattlers have won several athletics competitions.

- The Rattlers won the 5A-2 State football title in the 2005/2006 season.
- In 2016, the Rattler girls cross country team won first place at their Sectionals cross country meet, earning them a spot in the Arizona State championship meet.
- In 2016–2017, the Rattlers soccer team won the 5A Arizona state championship.
- In 2017, the Rattlers track and field team brought home two state titles for the girls and boys team, winning the DII Arizona State Championship for Track & Field.
- In 2018 the Rattlers girls track team brought home a 2nd straight girls track and field team state title.
- in 2019 the Rattlers girls track team brought home a 3rd straight team state title.

== Instrumental music ==
=== Marching band ===
The North Canyon High School Marching Band is known as the "Marching Rattlers". When the school first opened as North Canyon, the name of the ensemble was "The Stars of the North". The marching band's name was changed in 2013 to align with the school's mascot. Averaging around 40 members, the marching band serves two distinct, but related functions: presenting popular music (stand tunes) in performance at assemblies, at athletic events, and around the community; and advancing the art of the field performance, through the exploration of movement, and a blend of classical and modern music. The Marching Rattlers have been featured at the Bully Patrol Squad Assembly at Cactus View Elementary School.

== Notable alumni ==
- Jordan Stagmiller, professional soccer player
- Nick Sundberg, professional football player
- Austin Jackson, professional football player
- Athena Salman, Arizona House of Representatives Minority Whip
