= Nick Sundberg =

American football player (born 1987)

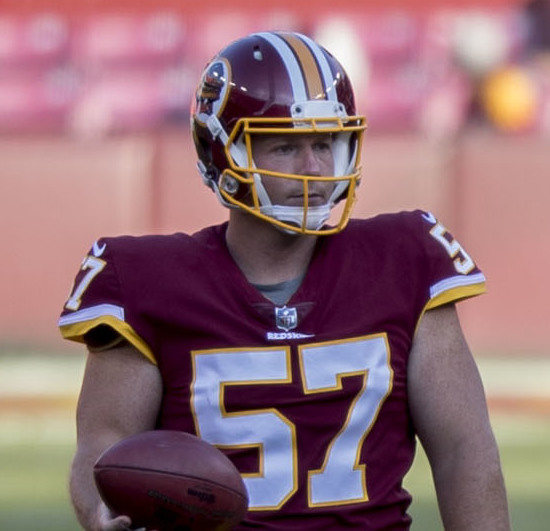
- Sundberg with the Washington Redskins in 2017

No. 57, 59
- Position: Long snapper

Personal information
- Born: July 29, 1987 (age 39); Phoenix, Arizona, U.S.
- Listed height: 6 ft 1 in (1.85 m)
- Listed weight: 254 lb (115 kg)

Career information
- High school: North Canyon (Phoenix)
- College: California
- NFL draft: 2009: undrafted

Career history
- Carolina Panthers (2009)*; Baltimore Ravens (2009)*; California Redwoods (2009); Washington Redskins / Football Team (2010–2020)
- * Offseason or practice squad member only

Career NFL statistics
- Games played: 152
- Total tackles: 18
- Stats at Pro Football Reference

Nick Sundberg (born July 29, 1987) is an American former professional football player who was a long snapper in the National Football League (NFL). He played college football for the California Golden Bears before signing with the Carolina Panthers of the National Football League (NFL) as an undrafted free agent in 2009. He was also a member of the Baltimore Ravens and Washington Redskins / Football Team of the NFL and the California Redwoods of the United Football League (UFL).

== Early life ==
Sundberg was born in Phoenix, Arizona and played high school football at North Canyon High School. He played left tackle until his junior season, when the coaches moved him to center. Since the previous long snapper had graduated, his coaches also made him the long snapper that season. It was at this point, that Sundberg began training with Ben Bernard. Ben Bernard was Sundberg's offensive and defensive line coach at North Canyon. Sundberg also trained under him to become a better long snapper. They trained 5–6 days a week including lifting weights after Sundberg's senior season. Under Bernard's tutelage, Nick was able to earn a full scholarship to the University of California Berkeley. Sundberg continues to train with Bernard every off-season in Phoenix and now assists him in the training of younger long snappers.

During his senior year, Sundberg was the team's captain and was named All-region honorable mention.

Sundberg also participated in wrestling and track and field at North Canyon.

== College career ==
Sundberg attended the University of California, Berkeley, where he played in 52 consecutive games and served as the long snapper for his entire four-year college career wit the Golden Bears. He won the starting job in preseason as a true freshman and served as the long snapper on field goals and punts in all 13 games all four years at Cal.

Sundberg graduated with a degree in legal studies in three-and-a-half years.

== Professional career ==
Pre-draft measurables
Height	Weight
6 ft 0 1/4 in (1.84 m)	246 lb (112 kg)
Values from Pro Day

=== Carolina Panthers ===
Sundberg was signed as an undrafted free agent by the Carolina Panthers on April 28, 2009. He was waived by the Panthers on August 7, 2009.

=== Baltimore Ravens ===
Sundberg was signed to the practice squad of the Baltimore Ravens on December 23, 2009.

=== Washington Redskins / Football Team ===
On January 29, 2010, Sundberg signed a future deal with the Washington Redskins. By the start of the 2010 season, he replaced Pro Bowl long snapper Ethan Albright, who was not resigned after the 2009 season. Washington signed veteran free agent, James Dearth, after Week 1 of the pre-season who Sundberg subsequently beat out for the team's long snapper position.

In the 2012 season opener win against the New Orleans Saints, Sundberg broke his left arm late in the first half of the game and continued to play throughout the second half. On September 11, 2012, he was placed on the injured reserve list, but was designated to return and the Redskins signed Justin Snow to replace him. On November 6, the Redskins activated Sundberg from injured reserve list.

Originally set to become a restricted free agent for the 2013 season, Sundberg agreed to a four-year contract to stay with the Redskins on March 10, 2013. In the Week 6 game against the Dallas Cowboys in 2013, he tore the meniscus in his right knee and was placed on injured reserve the next day.

On January 23, 2017, Sundberg signed a four-year contract extension with the Redskins.

On December 15, 2018, Sundberg was placed on injured reserve with a back injury.

In 2019, after recovering from a back surgery Sundberg played in all 16 games and helped punter Tress Way reach the Pro Bowl.

In the 2021 offseason, Sundberg announced that head coach Ron Rivera informed him that Washington would not sign him to a contract extension.

== Personal life ==
Sundberg resides in his hometown of Phoenix, Arizona during the offseason. Sundberg, with the Redskins Charitable Foundation, helped fund and start the Loads of Love program in the DC, Maryland, and Virginia area. The program aims to boost school attendance by installing washers and dryers in schools and homeless shelters that focus on families with young children. Sundberg was the Redskins nominee for the Walter Payton Man of the Year Award in 2017. As of 2019, the Loads of Love program has awarded over $750,000 for 91 local schools and non profits. Sundberg was nominated for the Walter Payton Man of the Year award for a second time in 2019.
