= Rob Babcock =

American basketball executive (1953–2019)

- Born: 1953; Phoenix, Arizona, U.S.
- Died: May 15, 2019 (aged 65–66); Minneapolis, Minnesota, U.S.
- Occupation: Former general manager of the Toronto Raptors

Robert Babcock (1953 – May 15, 2019) was an American basketball executive. He served as a Vice President of Basketball Operations with the Minnesota Timberwolves of the NBA, and also as general manager of the Toronto Raptors from 2004 to 2006.

== Education ==
Babcock was born in Phoenix, Arizona in 1953. He earned his master's degree in secondary education and psychology from Arizona State University in 1977. He received an undergraduate degree in 1974 from Grand Canyon University with a Bachelor of Arts degree in education and social studies. He then taught briefly at Paradise Valley High School in Phoenix, where he also coached the freshman basketball team.

== Career ==
Babcock was head coach at Phoenix College, where his teams advanced to the ACCAC playoffs twice and were the regional runners-up in 1986. He has "23 years of NBA management experience". In 2011, the Bleacher Report named Rob Babcock as one of the "10 Worst NBA GMs in League history".

=== NBA scout ===
He joined the NBA in 1987 as the director of scouting for the Denver Nuggets. He also held part-time scouting positions with the Detroit Pistons, Cleveland Cavaliers, San Diego Clippers and Indiana Pacers before joining the Nuggets staff.

=== Minnesota Timberwolves ===
Babcock then worked with the Minnesota Timberwolves for 12 seasons. The last two as the team's vice-president of player personnel. He served as the director of player personnel from 1994 to 2002 and two seasons (1992–94) as a full-time scout.

=== Toronto Raptors ===
On June 7, 2004, Babcock was named as the head of the Raptors' basketball operations. Raptors star Vince Carter had preferred Julius Erving as General Manager instead. Despite Carter's personal friendship with MLSE Chairman Larry Tanenbaum, the Raptors decided to hire Babcock instead.

==== 2004-2005 season ====
Babcock's first move as GM was drafting center Rafael Araujo 8th overall in the 2004 NBA draft, a widely criticized move from the onset, considering highly touted swingman Andre Iguodala was drafted with the next pick. Araujo's disappointing play fuelled criticism of Babcock. As well, prior to the 2004-05 season, Babcock signed mercurial point guard Rafer Alston to a 5-year deal. The move backfired, with Alston reportedly threatening to retire after repeated altercations with rookie head coach Sam Mitchell.

In the summer of 2005, Babcock signed Spanish point guard Jose Calderon. During the 2007-08 season, Calderon was the second most consistent player for the Raptors next to Chris Bosh, averaging over 8 assists and leading the league in assist/turnover ratio. Babcock also signed center Matt Bonner.

==== Vince Carter trade ====
Following trade rumours all season long, on December 17, 2004, Babcock traded star Vince Carter to the New Jersey Nets in exchange for Alonzo Mourning, Aaron Williams, Eric Williams and two first-round draft picks. Carter's production had been declining for the Raptors since the 2000–2001 season.

Mourning would never play a game for the Raptors, and shortly after the trade he was bought out by the Raptors, supposedly due to a career-threatening injury. Mourning would later sign with the Miami Heat and subsequently played a major role in their NBA Championship in 2006. The two Williams players played limited minutes for the Raptors prior to being traded in separate deals in 2006.

==== Other draft moves ====
Another Babcock pick, Joey Graham, who was drafted with one of the picks acquired from the trade with New Jersey, had a minor role on the Raptors as a bench player before leaving the team to join the Denver Nuggets in 2009. Roko Ukic was picked in the second round of the same year, and served as the primary backup behind Jose Calderon in 2008-2009.

Wayne Embry had originally been hired for the 2004–05 season as the Senior Basketball Advisor to Babcock. With MLSE citing a lack of confidence in Babcock's abilities, Embry was elevated to Senior Advisor to MLSE President and CEO Richard Peddie, bypassing Babcock in the chain of command.

In the 2005 NBA draft, Babcock again defied experts by drafting Charlie Villanueva with the 7th overall pick, a move criticized by some basketball analysts. Villanueva earned NBA Rookie of the Month honors in December 2005, scored a rookie-season-high 48 points in March 2006 against the Milwaukee Bucks, and finished as runner-up in the rookie of the year award. After being traded to the Bucks, Villanueva averaged 16.7 ppg and 6.9 rpg with the Bucks in the 2008–2009 season.

Babcock traded Rafer Alston to the Houston Rockets for point guard Mike James on October 4, 2005.

The Raptors began the 2005–06 season losing their first 9 games and 15 out of their first 16. The team improved in December, but continued to struggle in January.

==== Firing from the Toronto Raptors ====
On January 26, 2006, just a year and a half after being hired, Babcock was fired as the General Manager of the team by Maple Leafs Sports & Entertainment President and CEO Richard Peddie. In 2014, the Toronto Star has referred to Babcock's tenure as "the franchise's darkest days" Babcock later explained that, " A lot of people thought I was too college-ish, too much of a college guy trying to establish a college atmosphere...". Wayne Embry was named GM for the interim, and Bryan Colangelo, the ex-GM of the Phoenix Suns, was later appointed as Babcock's permanent successor.

=== Return to Timberwolves ===
Shortly afterwards, Babcock returned to the Minnesota Timberwolves organization as a consultant. On September 14, 2006, Babcock along with Fred Hoiberg were both hired as assistant general managers for the Timberwolves.

=== Firing from the Minnesota Timberwolves ===
On May 20, 2016, Babcock was fired as the Vice President of Basketball Operations of the team as Tom Thibodeau took over as coach and president of basketball operations and began to shake up the organization. Babcock is quoted as saying "nobody likes to be let go, but that’s part of this business," in reaction to the news.

== Personal life and death ==
Babcock's oldest son Chris is the Assistant Director of Player Development for the Philadelphia 76ers, and his youngest son Nate is the Video Coordinator for the Brooklyn Nets. Babcock's brothers Pete and Dave are also employed by the NBA.

On May 15, 2019, Babcock died of pancreatic cancer.
