= Angelo Gigli =

Italian basketball player (born 1983)

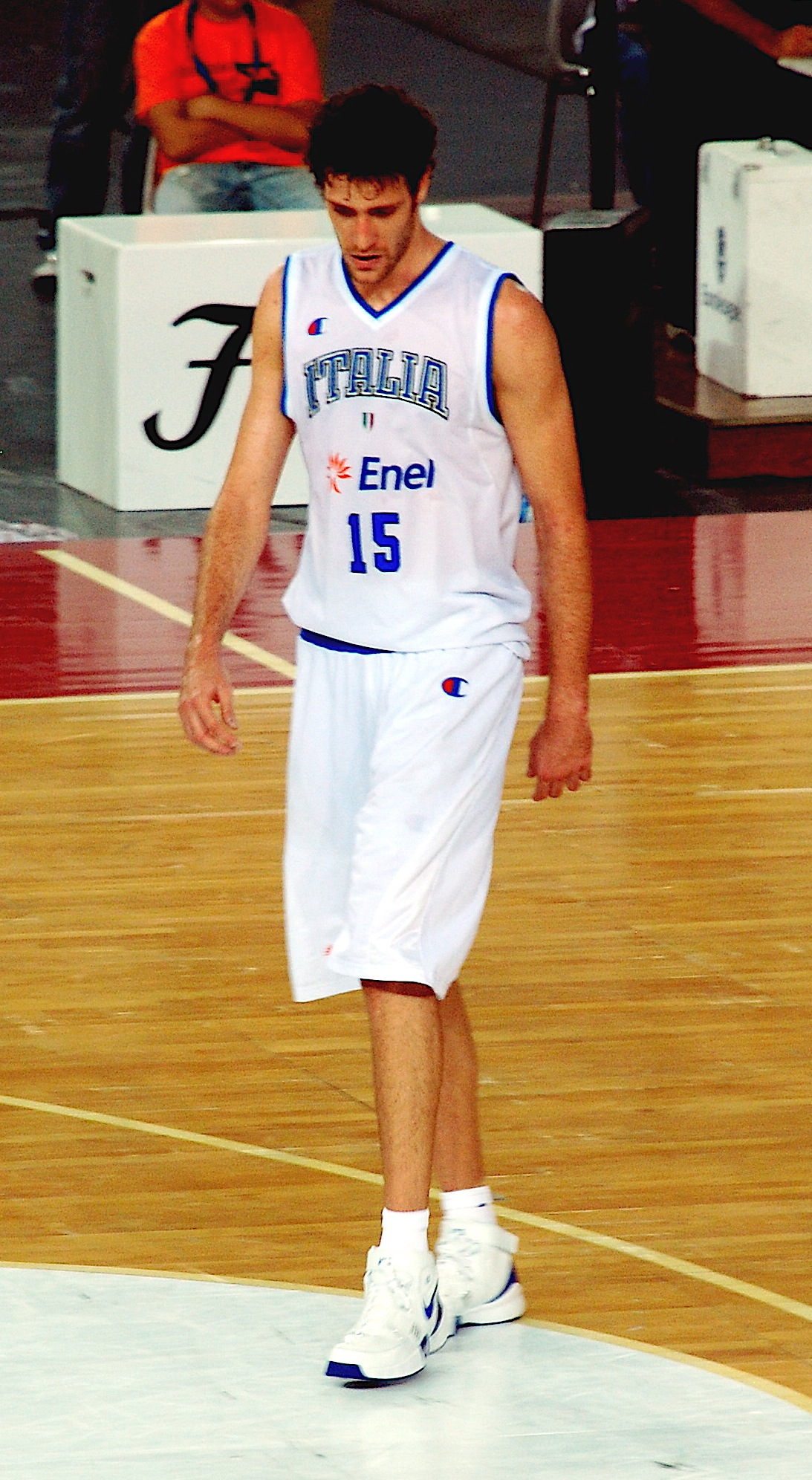

Basket Ferentino
- Position: Power forward / center
- League: Serie A2 Basket

Personal information
- Born: 4 June 1983 (age 43) Pietermaritzburg, South Africa
- Listed height: 6 ft 10.25 in (2.09 m)
- Listed weight: 230 lb (104 kg)

Career information
- NBA draft: 2005: undrafted
- Playing career: 2001–2019

Career history
- 2001–2002: Fortitudo Roma
- 2003–2006: Reggiana
- 2006–2008: Benetton Treviso
- 2008–2011: Virtus Roma
- 2011–2013: Virtus Bologna
- 2013–2015: Olimpia Milano
- 2014: → Reggiana
- 2015–2017: Ferentino
- 2017–2019: NPC Rieti
- 2019: Libertas Ghepard

Career highlights
- EuroChallenge champion (2014); Italian Cup champion (2007); Italian Supercup champion (2006)

Angelo Gigli (born 4 June 1983) is an Italian former professional basketball player. He has also represented the Italian national team internationally. Standing at 2.09 m (6 ft 10 1/2 in), he was a left-handed power forward and center.

== Early life ==
Gigli was born in South Africa, where his father worked. He moved to Italy when he was two years old.

== Professional career ==
He began his career with Fortitudo Roma. He then played for Reggio Emilia, Pallacanestro Treviso, and Lottomatica Roma. In July 2011 he signed with Virtus Bologna.

On 5 August 2013 Gigli signed a two-year contract with Emporio Armani Milano. In February 2014, he was loaned to Pallacanestro Reggiana for the remainder of the season. In August 2014, he returned to Emporio Armani.

Gigli sign with the Serie A2 club Basket Ferentino on 29 July 2015.

== Italian national team ==
Gigli was a member of the senior men's Italian national basketball team from 2005 to 2012 playing in EuroBasket 2005, 2006 FIBA World Championship and EuroBasket 2007.
