= Disappearance of Alissa Turney =

2001 unexplained disappearance

Alissa Marie Turney
- Born: April 3, 1984
- Disappeared: May 17, 2001 (aged 17); Phoenix, Arizona, U.S.
- Status: Missing for 25 years, 4 months and 8 days

Alissa Turney (born April 3, 1984) was an American girl who was last seen aged 17 in the Phoenix, Arizona, area on May 17, 2001.

== Background ==
Alissa Marie Turney of Phoenix, Arizona, was born in 1984 to parents Barbara Farner and Stephen Strahm. Alissa's parents divorced when she was three years old, and her mother, Barbara, married a man named Michael Turney. Michael, who had three children from a previous relationship, adopted Alissa and her older brother John. Shortly after they married, Michael and Barbara had a child of their own, Sarah. Barbara died of cancer when Alissa was nine years old, leaving Michael to raise all six children as a single parent.

At the time of her disappearance, Alissa lived with her adoptive father, Michael Turney, and half-sister Sarah Turney. The other children were adults and no longer lived at home. She worked at the fast-food restaurant Jack in the Box, and had a boyfriend.

== Disappearance ==
May 17, 2001, was the last day of Alissa's junior year at Paradise Valley High School. According to her adoptive father, he dropped her off in the morning as usual, then picked her up around lunchtime. Allegedly, they had an argument and she stormed off. Later, he and Sarah found a note in her bedroom, written by Alissa, claiming that she was running away to California. However, she had left her cell phone and other personal items behind. That night, Alissa had plans to go to a party, but did not attend.

On May 24, 2001, Michael Turney claimed that he received a phone call from a California number during which Alissa swore at him before hanging up.

In 2008, Michael claimed that Alissa was killed by two "assassins" from the International Brotherhood of Electrical Workers and that she was buried in Desert Center, California.

== Investigation ==
Turney filed a missing person's report on May 17, 2001, but in the immediate days following Alissa's disappearance, police did not suspect foul play, and no police investigation took place.

In 2006, self-proclaimed serial killer Thomas Albert Hymer told a prison guard that he had killed Alissa. He had been in prison since 2003 for an unrelated murder. However, when Phoenix police questioned Hymer, they ultimately determined that he had not had any contact with Alissa, and he admitted he might have confused her with a different victim.

In 2008, the case was reopened. In December 2008, detectives told Sarah that her father was their main suspect. Simultaneously, authorities were raiding the Turney home where they seized more than two dozen improvised explosive devices, 19 firearms, two homemade silencers, and a van full of gasoline. They also found a manifesto outlining his plans for a rampage against the International Brotherhood of Electrical Workers building in Phoenix. Michael Turney was arrested, prosecuted, and sentenced to 10 years in jail. He was released in August 2017.

== In the media ==
=== Television ===
Alissa's case was featured in two episodes of 20/20. In October 2014, it was the subject of "What Happened to Alissa?" (Season 3, Episode 57). In September 2023, it was the subject of "Since You've Been Gone" (Season 45, Episode 37). In both episodes, Michael Turney repeatedly asserted his innocence.

Dateline NBC showcased the recent developments in Alissa's case in December 2023 with an episode entitled, "The Day Alissa Disappeared." Michael Turney was interviewed as part of the episode and again declared he had nothing to do with Alissa's disappearance.

=== Podcasts ===
==== Missing Alissa ====
From July 2017 to January 2019, Phoenix resident and freelance journalist Ottavia Zappala released a podcast called Missing Alissa that explored the case, and interviewed some of Alissa's friends and family.

==== Voices for Justice ====
In June 2019, Alissa's half-sister Sarah Turney, who was 12 in 2001, began a podcast called Voices for Justice that explored Alissa's disappearance and the subsequent police investigation. She drew upon over 3,000 pages of publicly released notes and case documents from the Phoenix Police Department. In April 2020, Sarah began posting about the case on TikTok, garnering millions of views.

After over 30 episodes about Alissa's case, in January 2021 the podcast instead began covering other murders and missing persons cases in order not to jeopardize the ongoing investigation into Alissa's case.

== Arrest ==
In August 2020, Michael Turney was arrested in Mesa, Arizona. He was indicted and charged by a Maricopa County grand jury on second-degree murder charges in the death of Alissa.

== Aftermath ==
All charges against Michael Turney were dismissed in July 2023. As of 2026, Alissa's body had not yet been found.
