= Austin Jackson (American football) =

American football player (born 1999)

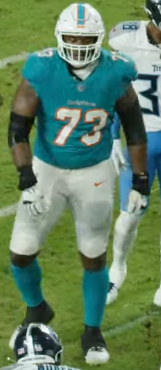
- Jackson with the Miami Dolphins in 2024

No. 73 – Miami Dolphins
- Position: Offensive tackle
- Roster status: Active

Personal information
- Born: August 11, 1999 (age 27); Sacramento, California, U.S.
- Listed height: 6 ft 5 in (1.96 m)
- Listed weight: 305 lb (138 kg)

Career information
- High school: North Canyon (Phoenix, Arizona)
- College: USC (2017–2019)
- NFL draft: 2020: 1st round, 18th overall pick

Career history
- Miami Dolphins (2020–present)

Awards and highlights
- First-team All-Pac-12 (2019)

Career NFL statistics as of Week 5, 2026
- Games played: 67
- Games started: 65
- Stats at Pro Football Reference

Austin Jackson (born August 11, 1999) is an American professional football offensive tackle for the Miami Dolphins of the National Football League (NFL). He played college football for the USC Trojans and was selected by the Dolphins in the first round of the 2020 NFL draft.

== Early life ==
Jackson grew up in Phoenix, Arizona and attended North Canyon High School, where he played defensive and offensive line on the school's football team and also was a member of the basketball and track and field teams. Jackson was rated a five-star recruit and the best collegiate prospect in Arizona as a senior and committed to play college football at the University of Southern California over offers from Washington and Arizona State.

== College career ==
Jackson played in all 14 of the Trojans games as a true freshman, appearing as a reserve offensive lineman and playing special teams on the field goal unit where he played on both sides and blocked a kick against Colorado. He was named USC's starting left tackle going into his sophomore year and started all 12 of the team's games.

Jackson missed part of the summer practices going into his junior season due having surgery to donate bone marrow to his sister, who has Diamond–Blackfan anemia. He returned to practice in early August and worked his way back to playing shape in time to begin the season as the Trojans starting left tackle. Jackson was named the Pac-12 Conference Offensive Lineman of the Week for Week 2 after his performance, which included blocking a 43-yard field goal attempt, in a 45–20 win over #23 Stanford on September 7, 2019. He was named first-team All-Pac-12 at the end of his junior year. Following the 2019 season, Jackson announced that he would forgo his senior year and declared for the 2020 NFL draft. Jackson played in all 39 of USC's games during his collegiate career with 25 starts.

== Professional career ==
Pre-draft measurables
Height	Weight	Arm length	Hand span	Wingspan	40-yard dash	10-yard split	20-yard split	Three-cone drill	Vertical jump	Broad jump	Bench press	Wonderlic
6 ft 4 7/8 in (1.95 m)	322 lb (146 kg)	34 1/8 in (0.87 m)	10 1/4 in (0.26 m)	6 ft 10 in (2.08 m)	5.07 s	1.73 s	2.92 s	7.95 s	31.0 in (0.79 m)	9 ft 7 in (2.92 m)	27 reps	25
All values from NFL Combine

Jackson was selected by the Miami Dolphins with the 18th overall pick in the first round of the 2020 NFL draft. The Dolphins previously traded defensive back Minkah Fitzpatrick to the Pittsburgh Steelers to acquire the pick. Jackson made his NFL debut on September 13, 2020, in the season opener against the New England Patriots, starting at left tackle and playing all of the team's offensive snaps. Jackson was placed on injured reserve on October 9 after suffering a foot injury in Week 4 against the Seattle Seahawks. He was activated on November 7.

Jackson entered the 2022 season as the Dolphins' starting right tackle. On September 16, 2022, Jackson was placed on short-term injured reserve with an ankle injury he suffered in Week 1. Miami activated Jackson on November 1. He was placed back on injured reserve on December 5.

Jackson returned as the Dolphins' right tackle in 2023. After starting every game protecting the blindside of Tua Tagovailoa, he signed a three-year, $36 million contract extension with $20.7 million guaranteed.

Jackson started 8 games for the Dolphins in 2024, and logged one fumble recovery. On November 12, 2024, it was announced that Jackson would miss the remainder of the season after undergoing knee surgery.

Jackson started the 2025 season as Miami's starting right tackle. In the team's season opener against the Indianapolis Colts, Jackson suffered a toe injury that caused him to be placed on injured reserve on September 13, 2025. He was activated on November 29, ahead of the team's Week 13 matchup against the New Orleans Saints.

== Personal life ==
Jackson's grandfather, Melvin Jackson, also played offensive line at USC and played in the NFL for the Green Bay Packers. In the summer of 2019, Jackson donated bone marrow to his younger sister Autumn, who had a rare form of anemia.

He is currently dating McKayla Rain whom he shares one son with, born in 2023.
