= Paradise Valley High School =

Public school in Arizona

Location
- 3950 E. Bell Road; Phoenix, AZ
- Coordinates: 33°38′31″N 111°59′53″W

Information
- Type: Public
- Motto: Prepare. Respect. Initiate. Do. Excel. (PRIDE)
- Established: 1957
- School district: Paradise Valley Unified School District
- Superintendent: Dr. C. Todd Cummings (district)
- Principal: Ian Deonise
- Staff: 99.18 (FTE)
- Grades: 9–12
- Enrollment: 1,886 (2023–2024)
- Student to teacher ratio: 19.02
- Colors: Black, red, white and gray
- Athletics conference: 5A Northeast Valley
- Nickname: Trojans
- Feeder schools: Greenway Middle School (partial) Sunrise Middle School (partial), Vista Verde Middle School (partial)
- Website: Official website

Paradise Valley High School (PVHS) is a high school located in Phoenix, Arizona and was the first of five high schools built in the Paradise Valley Unified School District. Paradise Valley High School opened in 1957. The school's athletic teams are referred to as the Trojans. Featuring a Block Schedule, Paradise Valley teaches a wide selection of courses in not only core academics but also technology and the arts. The football program at PVHS installed one of the first artificial turfs in the state, the only Sprinturf installation in Arizona, as its main football, soccer, and track field at a cost of $1 million.

== History ==
Paradise Valley opened in 1957 at Bell Road and 40th street, which at the time was on the outskirts of Phoenix. The campus was designed by local architect Mel Ensign, and built by H. A. Kramer Construction Co. The original campus consisted of an administration building, several small classroom buildings, and a small gymnasium and athletic fields located to the north of the classroom buildings. In the 1960s, a library, cafeteria, shop building and three larger classroom buildings were added to the campus. The gymnasium was also expanded in the 1960s. In the early 1970s a new building called the 700 building was constructed. Between 1976 and 1979 several new buildings were designed by the Tempe architecture office of Michael & Kemper Goodwin Ltd. The plan included a new vocational education building and an additional physical education building. In 1982, the remaining 1957 classroom buildings were demolished to make way for a larger classroom building. The new building was nearly complete when the 1983–1984 school year began. At that time the 1960s buildings were updated. In 1983 the 700 building was demolished to make way for a new 1,200 seat auditorium and associated fine arts building. The auditorium and fine arts building were completed in 1984. In 1990, it was decided that Paradise Valley would close its original campus and move to a new campus being constructed at Union Hills Drive and 16th Street. The new campus opened for the 1991–1992 school year. During this time the film Showdown was filmed with the campus used as the setting for much of the plot. It was then decided that the original campus would be renovated and reopened. The original gymnasium as well as the administration building were demolished and rebuilt and the campus was thoroughly spruced up. The updated school reopened for the 1993–1994 school year. The new campus on Union Hills was then renamed North Canyon High School. The CREST STEM program was established in 2010 offering students classes in bioscience, computer science, and engineering. In 2013 the three 1960s classroom buildings were demolished to make way for two new twin story buildings housing the science department and CTE classes. In 2013 the auditorium was also completely renovated. The 2013 projects were completed by McCarthy Construction.

When the school was established, the Paradise Valley High School District was created. In July 1976, the high school district unified with the elementary district to form the Paradise Valley Unified School District.

== Notable people ==
Alumni

- Alissa Turney, unsolved missing person
- Steve Bush, professional football player
- Matt Clapp, football player
- Joel Filani, football player
- Matt Dallas, actor
- Ryan Finley, football player
- Paul Watson, basketball player
- Jordan Brown, football player

Faculty

- Rob Babcock, basketball coach and teacher
- Dennis Van Roekel, math teacher
