= Filipe da Silva =

Portuguese-French basketball player

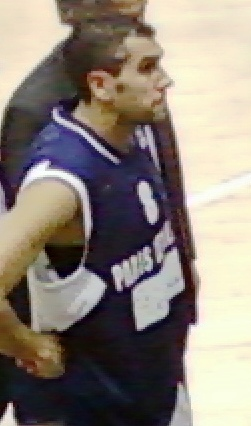
- da Silva in 2011

Saint-Quentin
- Position: Head coach
- League: LNB Pro A

Personal information
- Born: 30 November 1979 (age 46) Guimarães
- Listed height: 6 ft 4 in (1.93 m)
- Listed weight: 198 lb (90 kg)

Career information
- Playing career: 1997–2016
- Coaching career: 2016–present

Career history

Playing
- 1997–1998: Paris BR
- 1998–1999: Aix-Maurienne
- 1999–2001: Poissy-Yvelines
- 2001–2003: CAB Madeira
- 2003–2005: Oliveirense
- 2005–2007: CAB Madeira
- 2007–2008: CB Villa de los Barrios
- 2008: Boulazac
- 2009-2011: Évreux
- 2011-2012: Paris-Levallois
- 2012-2014: Rouen
- 2014-2016: Caen

Coaching
- 2016-2018: Cergy-Pontoise
- 2018–2024: Nanterre 92 (assistant)
- 2024–2025: Nanterre 92
- 2025–present: Saint-Quentin

Career highlights
- French 2nd Division French Player's MVP (2011)

Filipe da Silva (born 30 November 1979 in Guimarães) is a Portuguese-French professional basketball coach and former player.

== Professional career ==
In his pro career, he played with the Spanish club CB Villa de los Barrios.
