= 2013–14 Detroit Pistons season =

NBA team season

- Head coach: Maurice Cheeks (fired on February 9); John Loyer (interim)
- President: Joe Dumars
- General manager: Joe Dumars
- Owner: Tom Gores
- Arena: The Palace of Auburn Hills

Results
- Record: 29–53 (.354)
- Place: Division: 4th (Central); Conference: 11th (Eastern)
- Playoff finish: Did not qualify
- Stats at Basketball Reference

Local media
- Television: Fox Sports Detroit
- Radio: WWJ; WXYT (AM)/FM

The 2013–14 Detroit Pistons season was the 73rd season of the franchise, the 66th in the National Basketball Association (NBA), and the 57th in the Detroit area.

In the off-season, the Pistons hired former player Maurice Cheeks as their head coach as well re-acquiring former Finals MVP Chauncey Billups. John Loyer replaced Cheeks mid-season.

Following the season, Billups retired and Joe Dumars left his position as General Manager after 15 seasons.

== Key dates ==
- June 27: The 2013 NBA draft took place at the Barclays Center in Brooklyn, New York.
- July 1: 2013 NBA Free Agency begins.

== Draft picks ==
Round	Pick	Player	Position	Nationality	College/Team
1	8	Kentavious Caldwell-Pope	SG	United States	Georgia
2	37	Tony Mitchell	PF	United States	North Texas
2	56	Peyton Siva ^{[a]}	PG	United States	Louisville

^{a} Pick acquired from the Los Angeles Clippers on February 16, 2009, in exchange for Detroit's 2011 second round pick and Alex Acker.

== Roster ==
2013–14 Detroit Pistons roster
Players

Pos.	No.	Player	Height	Weight	DOB	From
SG	1	Chauncey Billups	6 ft 3 in (1.91 m)	210 lb (95 kg)	1976-09-25	Colorado
PG	12	Will Bynum	6 ft 0 in (1.83 m)	185 lb (84 kg)	1983-01-04	Georgia Tech
SG	5	Kentavious Caldwell-Pope	6 ft 5 in (1.96 m)	205 lb (93 kg)	1993-02-18	Georgia
SF	13	Luigi Datome	6 ft 8 in (2.03 m)	215 lb (98 kg)	1987-11-27	Italy
C	0	Andre Drummond	6 ft 10 in (2.08 m)	270 lb (122 kg)	1993-08-10	Connecticut
C	55	Josh Harrellson	6 ft 10 in (2.08 m)	275 lb (125 kg)	1989-02-12	Kentucky
PG	7	Brandon Jennings	6 ft 1 in (1.85 m)	169 lb (77 kg)	1989-09-23	Oak Hill Academy (VA)
PF	33	Jonas Jerebko	6 ft 10 in (2.08 m)	231 lb (105 kg)	1987-03-02	Sweden
PF	9	Tony Mitchell (DL)	6 ft 8 in (2.03 m)	235 lb (107 kg)	1992-04-07	North Texas
PF	10	Greg Monroe	6 ft 11 in (2.11 m)	250 lb (113 kg)	1990-06-04	Georgetown
SF	25	Kyle Singler	6 ft 8 in (2.03 m)	230 lb (104 kg)	1988-05-04	Duke
SG	34	Peyton Siva (DL)	6 ft 0 in (1.83 m)	185 lb (84 kg)	1990-10-24	Louisville
SF	6	Josh Smith	6 ft 9 in (2.06 m)	225 lb (102 kg)	1985-12-05	Oak Hill Academy (VA)
SG	3	Rodney Stuckey	6 ft 5 in (1.96 m)	205 lb (93 kg)	1986-04-21	Eastern Washington
PF	31	Charlie Villanueva	6 ft 11 in (2.11 m)	232 lb (105 kg)	1984-08-24	Connecticut

Coaches
Head coach
- Maurice Cheeks (fired)
- John Loyer (interim)
Assistant(s)
- John Loyer
- Maz Trakh
- Bernard Smith
- Rasheed Wallace
- Arnie Kander (strength and conditioning)
- Mike Abdenour (trainer)

Legend
- (DP) Unsigned draft pick
- (FA) Free agent
- (S) Suspended
- (DL) On assignment to D-League affiliate
- Injured

Roster
Updated: February 9, 2014

== Pre-season ==
2013 pre-season game log
Total: 4–4 (Home: 3–1; Road: 1–3)
Pre-season: 4–4 (home: 3–1; road: 1–3)

Game	Date	Team	Score	High points	High rebounds	High assists	Location Attendance	Record
1	October 8	Maccabi Haifa	W 91–69	Andre Drummond (17)	Andre Drummond (9)	Greg Monroe (4)	Palace of Auburn Hills; 7,513	1–0
2	October 10	Miami	L 107–112	Will Bynum (28)	Jonas Jerebko (12)	Will Bynum (6)	Palace of Auburn Hills; 17,219	1–1
3	October 12	@ Brooklyn	W 99–88	Andre Drummond (15)	Tony Mitchell (10)	Will Bynum (11)	Barclays Center; 16,331	2–1
4	October 16	@ Chicago	L 81–96	Kentavious Caldwell-Pope (18)	Andre Drummond (10)	Peyton Siva (9)	United Center; 21,405	2–2
5	October 17	@ Cleveland	L 84–96	Greg Monroe (16)	Andre Drummond (11)	Peyton Siva (5)	Quicken Loans Arena; 12,679	2–3
6	October 20	@ Orlando	L 86–87	Greg Monroe (19)	Andre Drummond (15)	Peyton Siva (7)	Amway Center; 12,967	2–4
7	October 22	Washington	W 99–96	Greg Monroe (18)	Andre Drummond (14)	Will Bynum (9)	Palace of Auburn Hills; 9,219	3–4
8	October 24	Minnesota	W 99–98	Josh Smith (20)	Andre Drummond (20)	Will Bynum (9)	Palace of Auburn Hills; 10,107	4–4

2013–14 season schedule

== Regular season ==
=== Game log ===
2013–14 game log
Total: 29–53 (Home: 17–24; Road: 12–29)
October: 1–0 (home: 1–0; road: 0–0)

Game	Date	Team	Score	High points	High rebounds	High assists	Location Attendance	Record
1	October 30	Washington	W 113–102	Greg Monroe (24)	Greg Monroe (16)	Smith, Billups, Bynum (5)	Palace of Auburn Hills; 19,258	1–0

November : 5–10 (home: 3–5; road: 2–5)

Game	Date	Team	Score	High points	High rebounds	High assists	Location Attendance	Record
2	November 1	@ Memphis	L 108–111 (OT)	Smith & Stuckey (19)	Andre Drummond (16)	Billups & Bynum (6)	FedExForum; 18,119	1–1
3	November 3	Boston	W 87–77	Smith, Monroe, Drummond (15)	Andre Drummond (12)	Bynum & Jennings (4)	Palace of Auburn Hills; 14,978	2–1
4	November 5	Indiana	L 91–99	Brandon Jennings (17)	Greg Monroe (10)	Brandon Jennings (6)	Palace of Auburn Hills; 13,401	2–2
5	November 8	Oklahoma City	L 110–119	Josh Smith (25)	Greg Monroe (15)	Brandon Jennings (11)	Palace of Auburn Hills; 15,624	2–3
6	November 11	@ Portland	L 103–109	Brandon Jennings (28)	Andre Drummond (16)	Will Bynum (6)	Moda Center; 18,834	2–4
7	November 12	@ Golden State	L 95–113	Andre Drummond (16)	Andre Drummond (14)	Will Bynum (4)	Oracle Arena; 19,596	2–5
8	November 15	@ Sacramento	W 97–90	Josh Smith (21)	Andre Drummond (18)	Brandon Jennings (9)	Sleep Train Arena; 17,317	3–5
9	November 17	@ L.A. Lakers	L 99–114	Brandon Jennings (23)	Andre Drummond (13)	Brandon Jennings (14)	Staples Center; 18,997	3–6
10	November 19	New York	W 92–86	Rodney Stuckey (21)	Drummond & Monroe (11)	Brandon Jennings (7)	Palace of Auburn Hills; 13,213	4–6
11	November 20	@ Atlanta	L 85–93	Brandon Jennings (21)	Andre Drummond (12)	Brandon Jennings (6)	Philips Arena; 13,167	4–7
12	November 22	Atlanta	L 89–96	Kyle Singler (22)	Andre Drummond (16)	Brandon Jennings (14)	Palace of Auburn Hills; 13,467	4–8
13	November 24	@ Brooklyn	W 109–97	Rodney Stuckey (27)	Greg Monroe (11)	Brandon Jennings (10)	Barclays Center; 17,732	5–8
14	November 25	Milwaukee	W 113–94	Rodney Stuckey (17)	Andre Drummond (8)	Brandon Jennings (13)	Palace of Auburn Hills; 12,150	6–8
15	November 27	Chicago	L 79–99	Rodney Stuckey (25)	Drummond & Smith (11)	Brandon Jennings (4)	Palace of Auburn Hills; 14,228	6–9
16	November 29	L.A. Lakers	L 102–106	Rodney Stuckey (22)	Josh Smith (19)	Josh Smith (8)	Palace of Auburn Hills; 15,202	6–10

December : 8–9 (home: 2–6; road: 6–3)

Game	Date	Team	Score	High points	High rebounds	High assists	Location Attendance	Record
17	December 1	Philadelphia	W 115–100	Andre Drummond (31)	Andre Drummond (19)	Brandon Jennings (12)	Palace of Auburn Hills; 14,107	7–10
18	December 3	@ Miami	W 107–97	Kyle Singler (18)	Andre Drummond (18)	Monroe & Jennings (5)	American Airlines Arena; 19,741	8–10
19	December 4	@ Milwaukee	W 105–98	Andre Drummond (24)	Andre Drummond (19)	Brandon Jennings (11)	BMO Harris Bradley Center; 12,835	9–10
20	December 7	@ Chicago	W 92–75	Brandon Jennings (33)	Andre Drummond (14)	Brandon Jennings (5)	United Center; 21,737	10–10
21	December 8	Miami	L 95–110	Drummond & Jennings (19)	Andre Drummond (14)	Brandon Jennings (6)	Palace of Auburn Hills; 18,034	10–11
22	December 10	Minnesota	L 94–121	Brandon Jennings (20)	Andre Drummond (8)	Brandon Jennings (7)	Palace of Auburn Hills; 11,251	10–12
23	December 11	@ New Orleans	L 106–111 (OT)	Greg Monroe (28)	Andre Drummond (11)	Jennings & Stuckey (4)	New Orleans Arena; 14,517	10–13
24	December 13	Brooklyn	W 103–99	Monroe & Drummond (22)	Andre Drummond (13)	Josh Smith (6)	Palace of Auburn Hills; 15,159	11–13
25	December 15	Portland	L 109–111 (OT)	Josh Smith (31)	Andre Drummond (14)	Brandon Jennings (10)	Palace of Auburn Hills; 13,003	11–14
26	December 16	@ Indiana	W 101–96	Josh Smith (30)	Greg Monroe (12)	Brandon Jennings (8)	Bankers Life Fieldhouse; 15,443	12–14
27	December 18	@ Boston	W 107–106	Brandon Jennings (28)	Andre Drummond (16)	Brandon Jennings (14)	TD Garden; 17,101	13–14
28	December 20	Charlotte	L 106–116	Brandon Jennings (26)	Andre Drummond (15)	Brandon Jennings (5)	Palace of Auburn Hills; 12,453	13–15
29	December 21	Houston	L 97–114	Josh Smith (19)	Greg Monroe (11)	Brandon Jennings (10)	Palace of Auburn Hills; 14,606	13–16
30	December 23	@ Cleveland	W 115–92	Josh Smith (25)	Monroe & Drummond (11)	Brandon Jennings (13)	Quicken Loans Arena; 19,215	14–16
31	December 27	@ Orlando	L 92–109	Brandon Jennings (21)	Andre Drummond (11)	Brandon Jennings (8)	Amway Center; 16,464	14–17
32	December 28	@ Washington	L 82–106	Greg Monroe (14)	Monroe & Drummond (7)	Brandon Jennings (6)	Verizon Center; 19,336	14–18
33	December 30	Washington	L 99–106	Greg Monroe (22)	Andre Drummond (16)	Brandon Jennings (14)	Palace of Auburn Hills; 15,050	14–19

January : 4–8 (home: 2–4; road: 2–4)

Game	Date	Team	Score	High points	High rebounds	High assists	Location Attendance	Record
34	January 5	Memphis	L 84–112	Greg Monroe (19)	Andre Drummond (14)	Brandon Jennings (11)	Palace of Auburn Hills; 14,134	14–20
35	January 7	@ New York	L 85–89	Josh Smith (21)	Andre Drummond (17)	Jennings & Smith (5)	Madison Square Garden; 19,812	14–21
36	January 8	@ Toronto	L 91–112	Brandon Jennings (22)	Andre Drummond (16)	Brandon Jennings (9)	Air Canada Centre; 16,194	14–22
37	January 10	@ Philadelphia	W 114–104	Josh Smith (22)	Josh Smith (13)	Josh Smith (7)	Wells Fargo Center; 13,742	15–22
38	January 11	Phoenix	W 110–108	Josh Smith (25)	Andre Drummond (13)	Brandon Jennings (18)	Palace of Auburn Hills; 15,224	16–22
39	January 17	Utah	L 89–110	Rodney Stuckey (21)	Andre Drummond (13)	Brandon Jennings (6)	Palace of Auburn Hills; 18,528	16–23
40	January 18	@ Washington	W 104–98	Josh Smith (22)	Andre Drummond (13)	Brandon Jennings (8)	Verizon Center; 17,039	17–23
41	January 20	L.A. Clippers	L 103–112	Rodney Stuckey (29)	Andre Drummond (11)	Brandon Jennings (6)	Palace of Auburn Hills; 17,417	17–24
42	January 22	@ Milwaukee	L 101–104	Brandon Jennings (30)	Andre Drummond (12)	Josh Smith (6)	BMO Harris Bradley Center; 11,266	17–25
43	January 24	New Orleans	L 101–103	Brandon Jennings (28)	Andre Drummond (20)	Brandon Jennings (7)	Palace of Auburn Hills; 14,107	17–26
44	January 26	@ Dallas	L 106–116	Brandon Jennings (26)	Greg Monroe (9)	Brandon Jennings (7)	American Airlines Center; 19,662	17–27
45	January 28	Orlando	W 103–87	Brandon Jennings (20)	Andre Drummond (17)	Brandon Jennings (8)	Palace of Auburn Hills; 11,534	18–27
–	January 29	@ Atlanta	Game postponed due to severe weather conditions.					

February : 5–8 (home: 5–4; road: 0–4)

Game	Date	Team	Score	High points	High rebounds	High assists	Location Attendance	Record
46	February 1	Philadelphia	W 113–96	Andre Drummond (22)	Andre Drummond (14)	Josh Smith (7)	Palace of Auburn Hills; 16,649	19–27
47	February 3	@ Miami	L 96–102	Brandon Jennings (26)	Andre Drummond (12)	Brandon Jennings (7)	American Airlines Arena; 19,802	19–28
48	February 5	@ Orlando	L 98–112	Josh Smith (25)	Andre Drummond (14)	Brandon Jennings (10)	Amway Center; 15,166	19–29
49	February 7	Brooklyn	W 111–95	Brandon Jennings (26)	Andre Drummond (22)	Brandon Jennings (9)	Palace of Auburn Hills; 13,727	20–29
50	February 8	Denver	W 126–109	Brandon Jennings (35)	Andre Drummond (15)	Brandon Jennings (12)	Palace of Auburn Hills; 15,870	21–29
51	February 10	San Antonio	W 109–100	Brandon Jennings (21)	Greg Monroe (10)	Brandon Jennings (6)	Palace of Auburn Hills; 13,628	22–29
52	February 12	Cleveland	L 89–93	Josh Smith (18)	Andre Drummond (17)	Jennings & Monroe (5)	Palace of Auburn Hills; 13,184	22–30
All-Star Break
53	February 18	Charlotte	L 96–108	Brandon Jennings (24)	Andre Drummond (22)	Brandon Jennings (7)	Palace of Auburn Hills; 11,285	22–31
54	February 19	@ Charlotte	L 98–116	Brandon Jennings (20)	Greg Monroe (7)	Will Bynum (8)	Time Warner Cable Arena; 14,400	22–32
55	February 21	Atlanta	W 115–107	Greg Monroe (22)	Greg Monroe (15)	Brandon Jennings (14)	Palace of Auburn Hills; 18,053	23–32
56	February 22	Dallas	L 102–113	Josh Smith (32)	Greg Monroe (17)	Will Bynum (8)	Palace of Auburn Hills; 15,213	23–33
57	February 24	Golden State	L 96–104	Greg Monroe (23)	Josh Smith (11)	Brandon Jennings (10)	Palace of Auburn Hills; 14,071	23–34
58	February 26	@ San Antonio	L 110–120	Josh Smith (24)	Andre Drummond (17)	Will Bynum (9)	AT&T Center; 18,581	23–35

March : 4–12 (home: 3–4; road: 1–8)

Game	Date	Team	Score	High points	High rebounds	High assists	Location Attendance	Record
59	March 1	@ Houston	L 110–118	Rodney Stuckey (23)	Andre Drummond (17)	Brandon Jennings (8)	Toyota Center; 18,330	23–36
60	March 3	New York	W 96–85	Andre Drummond (17)	Andre Drummond (26)	Brandon Jennings (11)	Palace of Auburn Hills; 14,742	24–36
61	March 5	Chicago	L 94–105	Greg Monroe (27)	Josh Smith (9)	Brandon Jennings (9)	Palace of Auburn Hills; 14,007	24–37
62	March 7	@ Minnesota	L 101–114	Greg Monroe (20)	Greg Monroe (15)	Brandon Jennings (5)	Target Center; 16,242	24–38
63	March 9	@ Boston	L 111–118	Josh Smith (28)	Andre Drummond (22)	Brandon Jennings (7)	TD Garden; 18,624	24–39
64	March 11	Sacramento	W 99–89	Josh Smith (24)	Greg Monroe (12)	Will Bynum (7)	Palace of Auburn Hills; 15,234	25–39
65	March 12	@ Toronto	L 87–101	Brandon Jennings (24)	Greg Monroe (10)	Will Bynum (7)	Air Canada Centre; 18,247	25–40
66	March 15	Indiana	L 104–112 (OT)	Josh Smith (23)	Greg Monroe (13)	Brandon Jennings (12)	Palace of Auburn Hills; 17,440	25–41
67	March 19	@ Denver	L 109–118	Greg Monroe (22)	Kentavious Caldwell-Pope (10)	Will Bynum (10)	Pepsi Center; 16,671	25–42
68	March 21	@ Phoenix	L 92–98	Rodney Stuckey (23)	Andre Drummond (16)	Will Bynum (9)	US Airways Center; 18,422	25–43
69	March 22	@ L.A. Clippers	L 103–112	Jonas Jerebko (22)	Andre Drummond (12)	Will Bynum (10)	Staples Center; 19,214	25–44
70	March 24	@ Utah	W 114–94	Drummond & Stuckey (19)	Andre Drummond (14)	Will Bynum (9)	EnergySolutions Arena; 17,595	26–44
71	March 26	Cleveland	L 96–97	Josh Smith (24)	Andre Drummond (11)	Brandon Jennings (13)	Palace of Auburn Hills; 15,979	26–45
72	March 28	Miami	L 78–110	Monroe & Bynum (12)	Andre Drummond (14)	Brandon Jennings (7)	Palace of Auburn Hills; 21,231	26–46
73	March 29	@ Philadelphia	L 98–123	Greg Monroe (20)	Greg Monroe (10)	Stuckey & Siva (4)	Wells Fargo Center; 17,438	26–47
74	March 31	Milwaukee	W 116–111	Greg Monroe (28)	Andre Drummond (16)	Brandon Jennings (13)	Palace of Auburn Hills; 13,062	27–47

April : 2–6 (home: 1–1; road: 1–5)

Game	Date	Team	Score	High points	High rebounds	High assists	Location Attendance	Record
75	April 2	@ Indiana	L 94–101	Josh Smith (24)	Greg Monroe (16)	Brandon Jennings (9)	Bankers Life Fieldhouse; 18,165	27–48
76	April 4	@ Brooklyn	L 104–116	Andre Drummond (23)	Andre Drummond (18)	Brandon Jennings (5)	Barclays Center; 16,754	27–49
77	April 5	Boston	W 115–111	Rodney Stuckey (26)	Andre Drummond (20)	Peyton Siva (5)	Palace of Auburn Hills; 19,558	28–49
78	April 8	@ Atlanta	W 102–95	Rodney Stuckey (29)	Andre Drummond (17)	Brandon Jennings (6)	Philips Arena; 10,587	29–49
79	April 9	@ Cleveland	L 100–122	Jennings & Jerebko (17)	Andre Drummond (14)	Brandon Jennings (7)	Quicken Loans Arena; 15,979	29–50
80	April 11	@ Chicago	L 98–106	Andre Drummond (26)	Andre Drummond (26)	Monroe, Jennings & Jerebko (3)	United Center; 22,219	29–51
81	April 13	Toronto	L 107–116	Greg Monroe (23)	Andre Drummond (17)	Brandon Jennings (7)	Palace of Auburn Hills; 16,944	29–52
82	April 16	@ Oklahoma City	L 111–112	Kentavious Caldwell-Pope (30)	Andre Drummond (13)	Greg Monroe (9)	Chesapeake Energy Arena; 18,203	29–53

2013–14 season schedule

=== Standings ===
Central Division	W	L	PCT	GB	Home	Road	Div	GP
c-Indiana Pacers	56	26	.683	–	35‍–‍6	21‍–‍20	12–4	82
x-Chicago Bulls	48	34	.585	8.0	27‍–‍14	21‍–‍20	11–5	82
Cleveland Cavaliers	33	49	.402	23.0	19‍–‍22	14‍–‍27	7–9	82
Detroit Pistons	29	53	.354	27.0	17‍–‍24	12‍–‍29	6–10	82
Milwaukee Bucks	15	67	.183	41.0	10‍–‍31	5‍–‍36	4–12	82

Eastern Conference
#	Team	W	L	PCT	GB	GP
1	c-Indiana Pacers *	56	26	.683	–	82
2	y-Miami Heat *	54	28	.659	2.0	82
3	y-Toronto Raptors *	48	34	.585	8.0	82
4	x-Chicago Bulls	48	34	.585	8.0	82
5	x-Washington Wizards	44	38	.537	12.0	82
6	x-Brooklyn Nets	44	38	.537	12.0	82
7	x-Charlotte Bobcats	43	39	.524	13.0	82
8	x-Atlanta Hawks	38	44	.463	18.0	82
9	New York Knicks	37	45	.451	19.0	82
10	Cleveland Cavaliers	33	49	.402	23.0	82
11	Detroit Pistons	29	53	.354	27.0	82
12	Boston Celtics	25	57	.305	31.0	82
13	Orlando Magic	23	59	.280	33.0	82
14	Philadelphia 76ers	19	63	.232	37.0	82
15	Milwaukee Bucks	15	67	.183	41.0	82

== Player statistics ==
Legend
GP	Games played	GS	Games started	MPG	Minutes per game
FG%	Field-goal percentage	3P%	3-point field-goal percentage	FT%	Free-throw percentage
RPG	Rebounds per game	APG	Assists per game	SPG	Steals per game
BPG	Blocks per game	PPG	Points per game

=== Season ===
Player	GP	GS	MPG	FG%	3P%	FT%	RPG	APG	SPG	BPG	PPG
Josh Smith	77	76	35.5	.419	.264	.532	6.8	3.3	1.36	1.43	16.4
Brandon Jennings	80	79	34.1	.373	.337	.751	3.1	7.6	1.26	.10	15.5
Greg Monroe	82	82	32.8	.497	.000	.657	9.3	2.1	1.11	.57	15.2
Rodney Stuckey	73	5	26.7	.436	.273	.836	2.3	2.1	.74	.14	13.9
Andre Drummond	81	81	32.3	.623	.000	.418	13.2	.4	1.25	1.62	13.5
Kyle Singler	82	36	28.5	.447	.382	.826	3.7	.9	.74	.46	9.6
Will Bynum	56	3	18.8	.428	.323	.802	1.8	3.9	.70	.13	8.7
Kentavious Caldwell-Pope	80	41	19.8	.396	.319	.770	2.0	.7	.94	.15	5.9
Charlie Villanueva	20	0	9.0	.380	.250	.571	1.7	.3	.20	.25	4.6
Jonas Jerebko	64	0	11.6	.471	.419	.729	2.7	.6	.33	.09	4.2
Chauncey Billups	19	7	16.3	.304	.292	.833	1.5	2.2	.42	.05	3.8
Josh Harrellson	32	0	9.9	.463	.387	.714	2.4	.5	.19	.47	2.9
Luigi Datome	34	0	7.0	.351	.179	.800	1.4	.3	.18	.03	2.4
Peyton Siva	24	0	9.3	.316	.280	.733	.60	1.4	.38	.04	2.3
Tony Mitchell	21	0	3.8	.417	1.000	.579	1.20	.1	.29	.14	1.0

== Transactions ==
=== Overview ===
Players Added

Via draft

- Kentavious Caldwell-Pope
- Tony Mitchell
- Peyton Siva

Via trade

- Brandon Jennings

Via free agency

- Josh Smith
- Chauncey Billups
- Luigi Datome
- Josh Harrellson
Players Lost

Via trade

- Brandon Knight
- Viacheslav Kravtsov
- Khris Middleton

Via free agency

- José Calderón
- Jason Maxiell

=== Trades ===
July 31, 2013	To Detroit Pistons Brandon Jennings (sign and trade)	To Milwaukee Bucks Brandon Knight; Viacheslav Kravtsov; Khris Middleton

=== Free agents ===
Additions
Player	Date signed	Former team
Josh Smith	July 10	Atlanta Hawks
Chauncey Billups	July 16	Los Angeles Clippers
Will Bynum	July 16	Re-signed
Luigi Datome	July 16	Virtus Roma (Italy)
Josh Harrellson	August 21	Chongqing Fly Dragon (NBL China)

Subtractions
Player	Reason Left	Date left	New team
Kim English	Waived	July 11	Montepaschi Siena
José Calderón	Free Agency	July 11	Dallas Mavericks
Jason Maxiell	Free Agency	July 18	Orlando Magic
