= 2011–12 Detroit Pistons season =

NBA team season

- Head coach: Lawrence Frank
- President: Joe Dumars
- General manager: Joe Dumars
- Owner: Tom Gores
- Arena: The Palace of Auburn Hills

Results
- Record: 25–41 (.379)
- Place: Division: 4th (Central); Conference: 10th (Eastern)
- Playoff finish: Did not qualify
- Stats at Basketball Reference

Local media
- Television: Fox Sports Detroit
- Radio: WWJ; WXYT-AM; FM

The 2011–12 Detroit Pistons season was the 71st season of the franchise, the 64th in the National Basketball Association (NBA), and the 55th in the Detroit area. In their first season under head coach Lawrence Frank the team finished with a 25–41 record and in 10th place in the Eastern Conference. In February, center Ben Wallace announced his retirement after 16 seasons, 9 of them spent with the Pistons.

This was also the Pistons' first season since 2001-02 without Richard Hamilton on the roster as he signed with the Chicago Bulls on December 14, 2011.

== Draft picks ==
Round	Pick	Player	Position	Nationality	College/Team
1	8	Brandon Knight	G	United States	Kentucky
2	33	Kyle Singler	F	United States	Duke
2	52	Vernon Macklin	F	United States	Florida

== Roster ==
2011–12 Detroit Pistons roster
Players

Pos.	No.	Player	Height	Weight	DOB	From
PG	12	Will Bynum	6 ft 0 in (1.83 m)	185 lb (84 kg)	1983-01-04	Georgia Tech
SF	5	Austin Daye	6 ft 11 in (2.11 m)	200 lb (91 kg)	1988-06-05	Gonzaga
SG	8	Ben Gordon	6 ft 3 in (1.91 m)	200 lb (91 kg)	1983-04-04	Connecticut
PF	33	Jonas Jerebko	6 ft 10 in (2.08 m)	231 lb (105 kg)	1987-03-02	Sweden
PG	7	Brandon Knight	6 ft 3 in (1.91 m)	185 lb (84 kg)	1991-12-02	Kentucky
C	20	Vernon Macklin (DL)	6 ft 10 in (2.08 m)	240 lb (109 kg)	1986-09-20	Florida
PF	54	Jason Maxiell	6 ft 7 in (2.01 m)	260 lb (118 kg)	1983-02-18	Cincinnati
C	10	Greg Monroe	6 ft 11 in (2.11 m)	250 lb (113 kg)	1990-06-04	Georgetown
SF	22	Tayshaun Prince	6 ft 9 in (2.06 m)	215 lb (98 kg)	1980-02-28	Kentucky
PG	23	Walker Russell	6 ft 0 in (1.83 m)	175 lb (79 kg)	1982-10-06	Jacksonville State
SG	3	Rodney Stuckey	6 ft 5 in (1.96 m)	205 lb (93 kg)	1986-04-21	Eastern Washington
PF	31	Charlie Villanueva	6 ft 11 in (2.11 m)	232 lb (105 kg)	1984-08-24	Connecticut
C	6	Ben Wallace	6 ft 9 in (2.06 m)	240 lb (109 kg)	1974-09-10	Virginia Union
SF	9	Damien Wilkins	6 ft 6 in (1.98 m)	225 lb (102 kg)	1980-01-11	Georgia

Coaches
Head coach
- Lawrence Frank
Assistant(s)
- Dee Brown
- Brian Hill
- Charles Klask
- John Loyer
- Bill Pope
- Roy Rogers
- Steve Hetzel
- Mike Abdenour (trainer)

Legend
- (DP) Unsigned draft pick
- (FA) Free agent
- (S) Suspended
- (DL) On assignment to D-League affiliate
- Injured

Roster
Updated: April 9, 2012

== Pre-season ==
2011 pre-season game log
Pre-season: 1–1 (home: 0–1; road: 1–0)

Game	Date	Team	Score	High points	High rebounds	High assists	Location Attendance	Record
1	December 16	Cleveland	L 87–91	Austin Daye (18)	Greg Monroe (13)	Brandon Knight (4)	The Palace of Auburn Hills; 7,927	0–1
2	December 20	@ Cleveland	W 90–89	Austin Daye (19)	Greg Monroe; Jonas Jerebko (7)	Brandon Knight (6)	Quicken Loans Arena; 9,853	1–1

2011–12 season schedule

== Regular season ==
=== Standings ===
Central Division	W	L	PCT	GB	Home	Road	Div	GP
z-Chicago Bulls	50	16	.758	–	26–7	24–9	13–1	66
x-Indiana Pacers	42	24	.636	8	23–10	19–14	9–4	66
Milwaukee Bucks	31	35	.470	19	17–16	14–19	7–8	66
Detroit Pistons	25	41	.379	25	18–15	7–26	4–11	66
Cleveland Cavaliers	21	45	.318	29	11–22	10–23	3–12	66

Eastern Conference
#	Team	W	L	PCT	GB	GP
1	z-Chicago Bulls	50	16	.758	–	66
2	y-Miami Heat *	46	20	.697	4.0	66
3	x-Indiana Pacers *	42	24	.636	8.0	66
4	y-Boston Celtics	39	27	.591	11.0	66
5	x-Atlanta Hawks	40	26	.606	10.0	66
6	x-Orlando Magic	37	29	.561	13.0	66
7	x-New York Knicks	36	30	.545	14.0	66
8	x-Philadelphia 76ers	35	31	.530	15.0	66
9	Milwaukee Bucks	31	35	.470	19.0	66
10	Detroit Pistons	25	41	.379	25.0	66
11	Toronto Raptors	23	43	.348	27.0	66
12	New Jersey Nets	22	44	.333	28.0	66
13	Cleveland Cavaliers	21	45	.318	29.0	66
14	Washington Wizards	20	46	.303	30.0	66
15	Charlotte Bobcats	7	59	.106	43.0	66

=== Game log ===
2011–12 game log
Total: 25–41 (Home: 18–15; Road: 7–26)
December: 1–3 (home: 1–1; road: 0–2)

Game	Date	Team	Score	High points	High rebounds	High assists	Location Attendance	Record
1	December 26	@ Indiana	L 79–91	Rodney Stuckey (17)	Three players (7)	Rodney Stuckey (6)	Bankers Life Fieldhouse; 18,165	0–1
2	December 28	Cleveland	L 89–105	Ben Gordon (25)	Greg Monroe (7)	Brandon Knight (6)	The Palace of Auburn Hills; 22,076	0–2
3	December 30	@ Boston	L 85–96	Greg Monroe (22)	Greg Monroe (9)	Rodney Stuckey (7)	TD Garden; 18,624	0–3
4	December 31	Indiana	W 96–88	Jonas Jerebko (20)	Jonas Jerebko (12)	Brandon Knight (6)	The Palace of Auburn Hills; 8,824	1–3

January : 3–16 (home: 2–7; road: 1–9)

Game	Date	Team	Score	High points	High rebounds	High assists	Location Attendance	Record
5	January 2	Orlando	W 89–78	Ben Gordon (26)	Jonas Jerebko (11)	Ben Gordon (6)	The Palace of Auburn Hills; 8,120	2–3
6	January 4	Chicago	L 83–99	Greg Monroe (19)	Greg Monroe (13)	Greg Monroe (5)	The Palace of Auburn Hills; 9,125	2–4
7	January 6	@ Philadelphia	L 73–96	Greg Monroe (22)	Jonas Jerebko; Brandon Knight (9)	Brandon Knight (4)	Wells Fargo Center; 19,408	2–5
8	January 7	New York	L 80–103	Brandon Knight (19)	Three players (6)	Brandon Knight (6)	The Palace of Auburn Hills; 12,044	2–6
9	January 9	@ Chicago	L 68–92	Greg Monroe (14)	Greg Monroe (10)	Greg Monroe (6)	United Center; 21,530	2–7
10	January 10	Dallas	L 86–100	Will Bynum (20)	Greg Monroe (7)	Austin Daye (4)	The Palace of Auburn Hills; 10,073	2–8
11	January 12	@ Milwaukee	L 93–102	Greg Monroe (32)	Greg Monroe (16)	Three players (4)	Bradley Center; 11,465	2–9
12	January 13	@ Charlotte	W 98–81	Jonas Jerebko (22)	Brandon Knight (10)	Two players (5)	Time Warner Cable Arena; 18,043	3–9
13	January 15	Golden State	L 91–99	Greg Monroe (25)	Greg Monroe (8)	Two players (6)	The Palace of Auburn Hills; 11,774	3–10
14	January 17	@ Houston	L 80–97	Tayshaun Prince (20)	Greg Monroe (11)	Greg Monroe (6)	Toyota Center; 9,318	3–11
15	January 18	@ Minnesota	L 85–93	Tayshaun Prince (29)	Greg Monroe (12)	Brandon Knight (6)	Target Center; 15,598	3–12
16	January 20	Memphis	L 81–98	Brandon Knight (22)	Greg Monroe (13)	Greg Monroe (4)	The Palace of Auburn Hills; 10,255	3–13
17	January 21	Portland	W 94–91	Rodney Stuckey (28)	Greg Monroe (8)	Rodney Stuckey (5)	The Palace of Auburn Hills; 14,456	4–13
18	January 23	@ Oklahoma City	L 79–99	Brandon Knight (13)	Two players (7)	Two players (3)	Chesapeake Energy Arena; 18,023	4–14
19	January 25	Miami	L 98–101	Austin Daye (28)	Greg Monroe (10)	Rodney Stuckey (6)	The Palace of Auburn Hills; 18,058	4–15
20	January 27	Atlanta	L 101–107	Greg Monroe (22)	Greg Monroe (11)	Brandon Knight (8)	The Palace of Auburn Hills; 14,010	4–16
21	January 28	@ Philadelphia	L 74–95	Greg Monroe (16)	Greg Monroe (10)	Walker Russel (5)	Wells Fargo Center; 18,710	4–17
22	January 30	@ Milwaukee	L 82–103	Rodney Stuckey (19)	Greg Monroe (10)	Two players (6)	Bradley Center; 13,103	4–18
23	January 31	@ New York	L 86–113	Jonas Jerebko (15)	Greg Monroe (12)	Two players (3)	Madison Square Garden; 19,763	4–19

February : 8–6 (home: 6–3; road: 2–3)

Game	Date	Team	Score	High points	High rebounds	High assists	Location Attendance	Record
24	February 1	@ New Jersey	L 96–98	Two players (21)	Greg Monroe (8)	Three players (4)	Prudential Center; 10,504	4–20
25	February 3	Milwaukee	W 88–80	Brandon Knight (26)	Jason Maxiell (12)	Brandon Knight (7)	The Palace of Auburn Hills; 13,181	5–20
26	February 4	New Orleans	W 89–87	Greg Monroe (24)	Greg Monroe (16)	Tayshaun Prince (5)	The Palace of Auburn Hills; 13,174	6–20
27	February 8	@ New Jersey	W 99–92	Greg Monroe (20)	Greg Monroe (12)	Rodney Stuckey (6)	Prudential Center; 10,145	7–20
28	February 10	New Jersey	W 109–92	Jonas Jerebko (20)	Greg Monroe (11)	Three players (5)	The Palace of Auburn Hills; 14,320	8–20
29	February 12	Washington	L 77–98	Greg Monroe (27)	Ben Wallace (7)	Walker Russell (4)	The Palace of Auburn Hills; 12,654	8–21
30	February 14	San Antonio	L 95–99	Rodney Stuckey (23)	Jason Maxiell (9)	Rodney Stuckey (8)	The Palace of Auburn Hills; 11,533	8–22
31	February 15	@ Boston	W 98–88	Rodney Stuckey (25)	Ben Wallace (11)	Rodney Stuckey (4)	TD Garden; 18,624	9–22
32	February 17	Sacramento	W 114–108	Rodney Stuckey (36)	Tayshaun Prince (10)	Brandon Knight (10)	The Palace of Auburn Hills; 14,686	10–22
33	February 19	Boston	W 96–81	Greg Monroe (17)	Two players (10)	Three players (3)	The Palace of Auburn Hills; 22,076	11–22
34	February 21	@ Cleveland	L 100–101	Brandon Knight (24)	Greg Monroe (11)	Greg Monroe (7)	Quicken Loans Arena; 13,459	11–23
35	February 22	@ Toronto	L 93–103	Greg Monroe (30)	Greg Monroe (14)	Walker Russell (4)	Air Canada Centre; 17,125	11–24
36	February 28	Philadelphia	L 68–97	Greg Monroe (20)	Two players (8)	Greg Monroe (3)	The Palace of Auburn Hills; 11,916	11–25
37	February 29	Charlotte	W 109–94	Rodney Stuckey (29)	Greg Monroe (20)	Brandon Knight (5)	The Palace of Auburn Hills; 14,534	12–25

March : 7–8 (home: 4–1; road: 3–7)

Game	Date	Team	Score	High points	High rebounds	High assists	Location Attendance	Record
38	March 3	@ Memphis	L 83–100	Rodney Stuckey (20)	Greg Monroe (11)	Two players (4)	FedEx Forum; 17,659	12–26
39	March 6	L. A. Lakers	W 88–85	Rodney Stuckey (34)	Greg Monroe (15)	Ben Gordon(5)	The Palace of Auburn Hills; 22,076	13–26
40	March 9	Atlanta	W 86–85	Greg Monroe (20)	Jason Maxiell (12)	Rodney Stuckey (7)	The Palace of Auburn Hills; 15,503	14–26
41	March 10	Toronto	W 105–86	Rodney Stuckey (20)	Ben Wallace (8)	Rodney Stuckey (8)	The Palace of Auburn Hills; 16,090	15–26
42	March 12	@ Utah	L 90–105	Rodney Stuckey (29)	Two players (5)	Rodney Stuckey (7)	EnergySolutions Arena; 19,393	15–27
43	March 14	@ Sacramento	W 124–112	Rodney Stuckey (35)	Greg Monroe (11)	Brandon Knight (11)	Power Balance Pavilion; 12,173	16–27
44	March 16	@ Phoenix	L 101–109	Rodney Stuckey (23)	Greg Monroe (9)	Rodney Stuckey (8)	US Airways Center; 17,148	16–28
45	March 18	@ L. A. Clippers	L 83–87	Greg Monroe (23)	Greg Monroe (15)	Two players (5)	Staples Center; 19,060	16–29
46	March 21	@ Denver	L 115–116	Ben Gordon (45)	Greg Monroe (11)	Ben Gordon (8)	Pepsi Center; 16,681	16–30
47	March 23	Miami	L 73–88	Brandon Knight (18)	Jason Maxiell (7)	Will Bynum (6)	The Palace of Auburn Hills; 22,076	16–31
48	March 24	@ New York	L 79–101	Ben Gordon (20)	Ben Wallace (7)	Walker Russell (4)	Madison Square Garden; 19,763	16–32
49	March 26	@ Washington	W 79–77	Rodney Stuckey (24)	Jonas Jerebko (12)	Brandon Knight (7)	Verizon Center; 15,911	17–32
50	March 28	@ Cleveland	W 87–75	Tayshaun Prince (29)	Greg Monroe (10)	Brandon Knight (5)	Quicken Loans Arena; 14,486	18–32
51	March 30	@ Chicago	L 71–83	Brandon Knight (16)	Greg Monroe (10)	Tayshaun Prince (6)	United Center; 22,385	18–33
52	March 31	Charlotte	W 110–107	Tayshaun Prince (24)	Two players (9)	Brandon Knight (6)	The Palace of Auburn Hills; 17,082	19–33

April : 6–8 (home: 5–3; road: 1–5)

Game	Date	Team	Score	High points	High rebounds	High assists	Location Attendance	Record
53	April 3	Orlando	W 102–95	Greg Monroe (22)	Greg Monroe (11)	Ben Gordon (7)	The Palace of Auburn Hills; 16,741	20–33
54	April 5	Washington	W 99–94	Greg Monroe (18)	Jason Maxiell (11)	Three players (3)	The Palace of Auburn Hills; 12,681	21–33
55	April 6	@ Atlanta	L 96–101	Rodney Stuckey (27)	Greg Monroe (8)	Greg Monroe (4)	Philips Arena; 15,143	21–34
56	April 8	@ Miami	L 75–98	Brandon Knight (16)	Two players (7)	Ben Gordon (2)	American Airlines Arena; 20,017	21–35
57	April 9	@ Orlando	L 89–119	Tayshaun Prince (21)	Tayshaun Prince (8)	Will Bynum (5)	Amway Center; 18,998	21–36
58	April 12	@ Charlotte	W 109–85	Greg Monroe (25)	Greg Monroe (11)	Two players (7)	Time Warner Cable Arena; 10,828	22–36
59	April 13	Milwaukee	L 97–113	Brandon Knight (25)	Greg Monroe (10)	Brandon Knight (8)	The Palace of Auburn Hills; 15,255	22–37
60	April 15	Chicago	L 94–100	Rodney Stuckey (32)	Jason Maxiell (9)	Brandon Knight (7)	The Palace of Auburn Hills; 17,450	22–38
61	April 17	Cleveland	W 116–77	Brandon Knight (28)	Greg Monroe (13)	Brandon Knight (7)	The Palace of Auburn Hills; 11,595	23–38
62	April 18	@ Atlanta	L 84–116	Greg Monroe (17)	Vernon Macklin (9)	Two players (3)	Philips Arena; 14,392	23–39
63	April 19	Minnesota	L 80–91	Tayshaun Prince (18)	Charlie Villanueva (12)	Three players (3)	The Palace of Auburn Hills; 12,458	23–40
64	April 22	Toronto	W 76–73	Two players (19)	Greg Monroe (17)	Rodney Stuckey (6)	The Palace of Auburn Hills; 14,370	24–40
65	April 23	@Indiana	L 97–103	Greg Monroe (18)	Greg Monroe (12)	Will Bynum (5)	Bankers Life Fieldhouse; 13,584	24–41
66	April 26	Philadelphia	W 108–86	Ben Gordon (26)	Ben Wallace (12)	Brandon Knight (7)	The Palace of Auburn Hills; 15,372	25–41

2011–12 season schedule

== Player statistics ==
Legend
GP	Games played	GS	Games started	MPG	Minutes per game
FG%	Field-goal percentage	3P%	3-point field-goal percentage	FT%	Free-throw percentage
RPG	Rebounds per game	APG	Assists per game	SPG	Steals per game
BPG	Blocks per game	PPG	Points per game

=== Season ===
Player	GP	GS	MPG	FG%	3P%	FT%	RPG	APG	SPG	BPG	PPG
Greg Monroe	66	66	31.5	.521	.000	.739	9.7	2.3	1.3	.7	15.4
Rodney Stuckey	55	48	29.9	.429	.317	.834	2.6	3.8	.8	.2	14.8
Brandon Knight	66	60	32.3	.415	.380	.759	3.2	3.8	.7	.2	12.8
Tayshaun Prince	63	63	33.1	.421	.356	.774	4.5	2.4	.4	.5	12.7
Ben Gordon	52	21	26.9	.442	.429	.860	2.3	2.4	.7	.2	12.5
Jonas Jerebko	64	13	22.9	.468	.302	.806	4.8	.7	.6	.3	8.7
Charlie Villanueva	13	0	13.8	.385	.333	.857	3.7	.5	.5	.4	7.0
Jason Maxiell	65	42	22.6	.478	.000	.547	5.1	.6	.5	.8	6.5
Will Bynum	36	0	14.3	.381	.241	.766	1.6	1.8	.6	.1	5.7
Austin Daye	41	4	14.7	.322	.210	.814	2.2	.8	.5	.5	4.7
Damien Wilkins	60	2	15.4	.394	.304	.630	1.7	.7	.5	.2	3.2
Walker Russell, Jr.	28	0	12.8	.347	.308	.636	.9	2.1	.6	.0	3.0
Vernon Macklin	23	0	5.9	.543		.571	1.5	.2	.2	.2	2.0
Ben Wallace	62	11	15.8	.395	.250	.340	4.3	.7	.8	.8	1.4

== Disciplinary actions ==
- Charlie Villanueva missed the first four games of the regular season following a suspension after a scuffle during a game against the Cleveland Cavaliers with Cavs center Ryan Hollins.

== Awards ==
- Brandon Knight was selected for the NBA All-Rookie First Team.

== Transactions ==
=== Overview ===
Players Added

Via draft

- Brandon Knight
- Vernon Macklin

Via free agency

- Damien Wilkins
- Walker Russell, Jr.
Players Lost

Via free agency

- Tracy McGrady
- DaJuan Summers
- Chris Wilcox

Waived

- Richard Hamilton
- Terrico White

=== Free agents ===
Additions
Player	Date signed	Former team
Jonas Jerebko	December 9	Re-signed
Tayshaun Prince	December 9	Re-signed
Damien Wilkins	December 9	Atlanta Hawks
Rodney Stuckey	December 17	Re-signed
Walker Russell, Jr.	January 20	Fort Wayne Mad Ants (from D-League)

Subtractions
Player	Date signed	New team
Tracy McGrady	December 9	Atlanta Hawks
Chris Wilcox	December 9	Boston Celtics
DaJuan Summers	December 9	New Orleans Hornets
Terrico White	December 9	New Orleans Hornets

Many players signed with teams from other leagues due to the 2011 NBA lockout. FIBA allows players under NBA contracts to sign and play for teams from other leagues if the contracts have opt-out clauses that allow the players to return to the NBA if the lockout ends. The Chinese Basketball Association, however, only allows its clubs to sign foreign free agents who could play for at least the entire season.

Played in other leagues during lockout
Player	Date signed	New team	Opt-out clause
DaJuan Summers	July 3	Montepaschi Siena (Italy)	No
Austin Daye	September 23	BC Khimki (Russia)	Yes

== See also ==
2011–12 NBA season
