= 2009–10 Detroit Pistons season =

NBA team season

- Head coach: John Kuester
- President: Joe Dumars
- General manager: Joe Dumars
- Owner: Karen Davidson
- Arena: The Palace of Auburn Hills

Results
- Record: 27–55 (.329)
- Place: Division: 5th (Central); Conference: 13th (Eastern)
- Playoff finish: Did not qualify
- Stats at Basketball Reference

Local media
- Television: Fox Sports Detroit
- Radio: WWJ; WXYT-AM; FM

The 2009–10 Detroit Pistons season was the 69th season of the franchise, the 62nd in the National Basketball Association (NBA), and the 53rd in the Detroit area.

The Pistons missed the playoffs for the first time since the 2000–01 NBA season. The Pistons finished with their most disappointing record since 1994–95 when they finished 28–54. Prior to the season, Allen Iverson signed with the Memphis Grizzlies, citing his displeasure at being a bench player. However, he would leave the Grizzlies 2 months after signing with the team for the same reason.

== Draft picks ==
- Austin Daye
- DaJuan Summers
- Jonas Jerebko
- Chase Budinger

== Roster ==
2009–10 Detroit Pistons roster
Players

Pos.	No.	Player	Height	Weight	DOB	From
PG	17	Chucky Atkins	5 ft 11 in (1.80 m)	185 lb (84 kg)	1974-08-14	South Florida
C	38	Kwame Brown	6 ft 11 in (2.11 m)	270 lb (122 kg)	1982-03-10	Glynn Academy (GA)
PG	12	Will Bynum	6 ft 0 in (1.83 m)	185 lb (84 kg)	1983-01-04	Georgia Tech
SF	5	Austin Daye	6 ft 10 in (2.08 m)	200 lb (91 kg)	1988-06-05	Gonzaga
SG	7	Ben Gordon	6 ft 3 in (1.91 m)	200 lb (91 kg)	1983-04-04	Connecticut
SG	32	Richard Hamilton	6 ft 7 in (2.01 m)	193 lb (88 kg)	1978-02-14	Connecticut
PF	33	Jonas Jerebko	6 ft 10 in (2.08 m)	231 lb (105 kg)	1987-03-02	Sweden
C	54	Jason Maxiell	6 ft 7 in (2.01 m)	260 lb (118 kg)	1983-02-18	Cincinnati
SF	22	Tayshaun Prince	6 ft 9 in (2.06 m)	215 lb (98 kg)	1980-02-28	Kentucky
PG	3	Rodney Stuckey	6 ft 5 in (1.96 m)	205 lb (93 kg)	1986-04-21	Eastern Washington
SF	35	DaJuan Summers	6 ft 8 in (2.03 m)	240 lb (109 kg)	1988-01-24	Georgetown
PF	31	Charlie Villanueva	6 ft 11 in (2.11 m)	232 lb (105 kg)	1984-08-24	Connecticut
C	6	Ben Wallace	6 ft 9 in (2.06 m)	240 lb (109 kg)	1974-09-10	Virginia Union
PF	9	Chris Wilcox	6 ft 10 in (2.08 m)	235 lb (107 kg)	1982-09-03	Maryland

Coaches
Head coach
- John Kuester
Assistant(s)
- Brian Hill
- Bill Pope
- Pat Sullivan
- Darrell Walker
- Mike Abdenour (trainer)

Legend
- (DP) Unsigned draft pick
- (FA) Free agent
- (S) Suspended
- Injured

Roster
Updated: September 28, 2009

== Regular season ==
=== Standings ===
Central Division	W	L	PCT	GB	Home	Road	Div
z-Cleveland Cavaliers	61	21	.744	–	35–6	26–15	12–4
x-Milwaukee Bucks	46	36	.561	15	28–13	18–23	10–6
x-Chicago Bulls	41	41	.500	20	24–17	17–24	10–6
Indiana Pacers	32	50	.390	29	23–18	9–32	6–10
Detroit Pistons	27	55	.329	34	17–24	10–31	2–14

#	Eastern Conference				
#	Team	W	L	PCT	GB
1	z-Cleveland Cavaliers	61	21	.744	–
2	y-Orlando Magic	59	23	.720	2
3	x-Atlanta Hawks	53	29	.646	8
4	y-Boston Celtics	50	32	.610	11
5	x-Miami Heat	47	35	.573	14
6	x-Milwaukee Bucks	46	36	.561	15
7	x-Charlotte Bobcats	44	38	.537	17
8	x-Chicago Bulls	41	41	.500	20
9	Toronto Raptors	40	42	.488	21
10	Indiana Pacers	32	50	.390	29
11	New York Knicks	29	53	.354	32
12	Philadelphia 76ers	27	55	.329	34
13	Detroit Pistons	27	55	.329	34
14	Washington Wizards	26	56	.317	35
15	New Jersey Nets	12	70	.146	49

=== Game log ===
2009–10 game log
Total: 27–55 (Home: 17–24; Road: 10–31)
October: 1–2 (home: 0–1; road: 1–1)

Game	Date	Team	Score	High points	High rebounds	High assists	Location Attendance	Record
1	October 28	@ Memphis	W 96–74	Richard Hamilton (25)	Ben Wallace (9)	Will Bynum (7)	FedExForum; 17,212	1–0
2	October 30	Oklahoma City	L 83–91	Ben Gordon (25)	Ben Wallace (12)	Ben Gordon (4)	The Palace of Auburn Hills; 22,076	1–1
3	October 31	@ Milwaukee	L 85–96	Ben Gordon (26)	Ben Wallace (10)	Rodney Stuckey (8)	Bradley Center; 15,095	1–2

November : 5–9 (home: 4–3; road: 1–6)

Game	Date	Team	Score	High points	High rebounds	High assists	Location Attendance	Record
4	November 3	Orlando	W 85–80	Ben Gordon (23)	Ben Wallace (10)	Ben Gordon, Rodney Stuckey (3)	The Palace of Auburn Hills; 15,487	2-2
5	November 4	@ Toronto	L 99–110	Ben Gordon (30)	Rodney Stuckey (10)	Will Bynum (6)	Air Canada Centre; 17,915	2–3
6	November 6	@ Orlando	L 103–110	Charlie Villanueva (28)	Jonas Jerebko (6)	Ben Gordon (5)	Amway Arena; 17,461	2–4
7	November 8	Philadelphia	W 88–81	Ben Gordon (23)	Ben Wallace (16)	Will Bynum (8)	The Palace of Auburn Hills; 17,187	3–4
8	November 11	Charlotte	W 98–75	Charlie Villanueva (30)	Ben Wallace (9)	Ben Gordon (8)	The Palace of Auburn Hills; 15,417	4-4
9	November 14	@ Washington	W 106–103	Ben Gordon (29)	Rodney Stuckey (9)	Will Bynum (6)	Verizon Center; 20,173	5–4
10	November 15	Dallas	L 90–95	Rodney Stuckey (28)	Charlie Villanueva, Ben Wallace (10)	Will Bynum (3)	The Palace of Auburn Hills; 18,215	5-5
11	November 17	@ LA Lakers	L 93–106	Will Bynum (24)	Jason Maxiell (7)	Will Bynum (6)	Staples Center; 18,997	5–6
12	November 18	@ Portland	L 81–87	Rodney Stuckey (21)	Ben Wallace (12)	Rodney Stuckey (5)	Rose Garden Arena; 20,391	5–7
13	November 21	@ Utah	L 97–100 (OT)	Ben Gordon (25)	Ben Wallace (9)	Rodney Stuckey (6)	EnergySolutions Arena; 18,355	5–8
14	November 22	@ Phoenix	L 91–117	DaJuan Summers, Charlie Villanueva (13)	Jason Maxiell (7)	Rodney Stuckey (5)	US Airways Center; 18,422	5–9
15	November 25	Cleveland	L 88–98	Rodney Stuckey (25)	Ben Wallace (9)	Will Bynum (5)	The Palace of Auburn Hills; 22,076	5–10
16	November 27	LA Clippers	L 96–104	Jonas Jerebko (22)	Ben Wallace (16)	Will Bynum (9)	The Palace of Auburn Hills; 18,594	5–11
17	November 29	Atlanta	W 94–88	Rodney Stuckey (23)	Ben Wallace (18)	Rodney Stuckey (8)	The Palace of Auburn Hills; 15,273	6–11

December : 5–10 (home: 4–4; road: 1–6)

Game	Date	Team	Score	High points	High rebounds	High assists	Location Attendance	Record
18	December 2	@ Chicago	L 85–92	Ben Gordon (18)	Rodney Stuckey (9)	Will Bynum (7)	United Center; 21,523	6–12
19	December 4	Milwaukee	W 105–96	Rodney Stuckey (19)	Ben Wallace (11)	Rodney Stuckey (9)	The Palace of Auburn Hills; 16,557	7–12
20	December 6	Washington	W 98–94	Rodney Stuckey (25)	Jonas Jerebko (11)	Charlie Villanueva, Ben Wallace, Chucky Atkins (5)	The Palace of Auburn Hills; 14,123	8–12
21	December 9	@ Philadelphia	W 90–86	Rodney Stuckey (27)	Ben Wallace (12)	Rodney Stuckey (8)	Wachovia Center; 12,136	9–12
22	December 10	Denver	W 101–99	Charlie Villanueva (27)	Ben Wallace (16)	Charlie Villanueva (5)	The Palace of Auburn Hills; 17,176	10–12
23	December 12	Golden State	W 104–95	Rodney Stuckey (29)	Charlie Villanueva, Ben Wallace (9)	Rodney Stuckey (7)	The Palace of Auburn Hills; 16,952	11–12
24	December 15	@ Houston	L 96–107	Richard Hamilton (21)	Ben Wallace (8)	Chucky Atkins (9)	Toyota Center; 14,899	11–13
25	December 16	@ New Orleans	L 87–95	Rodney Stuckey (26)	Charlie Villanueva (8)	Will Bynum (9)	New Orleans Arena; 13,196	11–14
26	December 18	@ Oklahoma City	L 98–109	Rodney Stuckey (31)	Ben Wallace (8)	Will Bynum (6)	Ford Center; 17,774	11–15
27	December 20	L.A. Lakers	L 81–93	Rodney Stuckey (16)	Ben Wallace (10)	Chucky Atkins, Will Bynum (4)	The Palace of Auburn Hills; 22,076	11–16
28	December 22	@ Charlotte	L 76–88	Rodney Stuckey (20)	Ben Wallace (8)	Will Bynum (4)	Time Warner Cable Arena; 16,864	11–17
29	December 23	Toronto	L 64–94	Will Bynum (12)	Ben Wallace (10)	Will Bynum, Rodney Stuckey (3)	The Palace of Auburn Hills; 19,396	11–18
30	December 27	@ Toronto	L 95–102	Richard Hamilton, Ben Gordon (15)	Ben Wallace (9)	Rodney Stuckey (5)	Air Canada Centre; 19,800	11–19
31	December 29	New York	L 87–104	Ben Gordon (17)	Rodney Stuckey, Ben Wallace (8)	Rodney Stuckey (5)	The Palace of Auburn Hills; 22,076	11–20
32	December 31	Chicago	L 87–98	Rodney Stuckey (22)	Ben Wallace (9)	Rodney Stuckey (6)	The Palace of Auburn Hills; 22,076	11–21

January : 4–10 (home: 3–6; road: 1–4)

Game	Date	Team	Score	High points	High rebounds	High assists	Location Attendance	Record
33	January 5	@ Dallas	L 93–98	Richard Hamilton (20)	Ben Wallace (12)	Rodney Stuckey (6)	American Airlines Center; 19,799	11–22
34	January 6	@ San Antonio	L 92–112	Richard Hamilton (29)	Chris Wilcox (9)	Tayshaun Prince (6)	Conseco Fieldhouse; 17,337	11–23
35	January 9	Philadelphia	L 94–104	Ben Gordon (20)	Austin Daye (7)	Richard Hamilton (7)	The Palace of Auburn Hills; 19,784	11–24
36	January 11	@ Chicago	L 87–120	Richard Hamilton (17)	Jonas Jerebko (9)	Rodney Stuckey (5)	United Center; 21,014	11–25
37	January 12	@ Washington	W 99–90	Charlie Villanueva (23)	Charlie Villanueva (9)	Rodney Stuckey (11)	Verizon Center; 13,544	12–25
38	January 15	New Orleans	W 110–104 (OT)	Richard Hamilton (32)	Ben Wallace (21)	Richard Hamilton (10)	The Palace of Auburn Hills; 17,446	13–25
39	January 16	New York	W 94–90	Rodney Stuckey (20)	Charlie Villanueva, Chris Wilcox (10)	Richard Hamilton (5)	The Palace of Auburn Hills; 19,185	14–25
40	January 18	@ New York	L 91–99	Rodney Stuckey (22)	Ben Wallace (17)	Rodney Stuckey (4)	Madison Square Garden; 19,302	14–26
41	January 20	Boston	W 92–86	Rodney Stuckey (27)	Rodney Stuckey (11)	Richard Hamilton (8)	The Palace of Auburn Hills; 17,375	15–26
42	January 22	Indiana	L 93–105	Richard Hamilton (27)	Jonas Jerebko (7)	Rodney Stuckey (5)	The Palace of Auburn Hills; 15,388	15–27
43	January 23	Portland	L 93–97	Richard Hamilton (25)	Ben Wallace, Chris Wilcox (8)	Richard Hamilton (9)	The Palace of Auburn Hills; 19,114	15–28
44	January 27	Memphis	L 93–99	Rodney Stuckey (17)	Ben Wallace (9)	Rodney Stuckey (11)	The Palace of Auburn Hills; 14,886	15–29
45	January 29	Miami	L 65–92	Charlie Villanueva (15)	Richard Hamilton, Tayshaun Prince, Charlie Villanueva, Ben Wallace, Chris Wilcox (4)	Richard Hamilton (5)	The Palace of Auburn Hills; 20,669	15–30
46	January 31	Orlando	L 86–91	Rodney Stuckey (18)	Jonas Jerebko, Tayshaun Prince, Ben Wallace (9)	Rodney Stuckey (7)	The Palace of Auburn Hills; 19,107	15–31

February : 6–7 (home: 3–2; road: 3–5)

Game	Date	Team	Score	High points	High rebounds	High assists	Location Attendance	Record
47	February 2	@ New Jersey	W 97–93	Richard Hamilton (22)	Tayshaun Prince (8)	Rodney Stuckey (9)	Izod Center; 9,417	16–31
48	February 5	@ Indiana	L 83–107	Ben Gordon (26)	Jonas Jerebko (10)	Will Bynum (7)	Conseco Fieldhouse; 14,832	16–32
49	February 6	New Jersey	W 99–92	Jonas Jerebko (20)	Ben Wallace (10)	Rodney Stuckey (11)	The Palace of Auburn Hills; 20,176	17–32
50	February 9	@ Milwaukee	W 93–81	Ben Gordon, Tayshaun Prince, Rodney Stuckey (18)	Jonas Jerebko (13)	Rodney Stuckey (7)	Bradley Center; 12,017	18–32
51	February 10	Sacramento	L 97–103	Tayshaun Prince (23)	Ben Wallace (13)	Rodney Stuckey (9)	The Palace of Auburn Hills; 14,152	18–33
52	February 16	Minnesota	W 108–85	Jonas Jerebko (21)	Jason Maxiell (10)	Will Bynum (14)	The Palace of Auburn Hills; 14,449	19–33
53	February 17	@ Orlando	L 91–116	Richard Hamilton (36)	Tayshaun Prince (8)	Rodney Stuckey (7)	Amway Arena; 17,461	19–34
54	February 19	Milwaukee	L 85–91	Richard Hamilton (29)	Ben Wallace (12)	Tayshaun Prince (7)	The Palace of Auburn Hills; 18,701	19–35
55	February 21	San Antonio	W 109–101 (OT)	Richard Hamilton (27)	Jonas Jerebko (10)	Rodney Stuckey (6)	The Palace of Auburn Hills; 20,153	20–35
56	February 23	@ Sacramento	W 101–89	Richard Hamilton (30)	Rodney Stuckey (8)	Rodney Stuckey (7)	ARCO Arena; 11,557	21–35
57	February 24	@ LA Clippers	L 91–97	Richard Hamilton (21)	Tayshaun Prince, Ben Wallace (10)	Will Bynum, Tayshaun Prince, Rodney Stuckey (4)	Staples Center; 16,095	21–36
58	February 26	@ Denver	L 102–107	Richard Hamilton (20)	Ben Wallace (10)	Rodney Stuckey (6)	Pepsi Center; 19,845	21–37
59	February 27	@ Golden State	L 88–95	Tayshaun Prince (18)	Ben Wallace (13)	Tayshaun Prince (8)	Oracle Arena; 17,223	21–38

March : 2–13 (home: 2–6; road: 0–7)

Game	Date	Team	Score	High points	High rebounds	High assists	Location Attendance	Record
60	March 2	Boston	L 100–105	Jonas Jerebko (16)	Ben Wallace (12)	Richard Hamilton (7)	The Palace of Auburn Hills; 17,956	21–39
61	March 3	@ New York	L 104–128	Tayshaun Prince, Rodney Stuckey (16)	Jonas Jerebko (13)	Rodney Stuckey (6)	Madison Square Garden; 19,341	21–40
62	March 5	@ Cleveland	L 92–99	Tayshaun Prince (23)	Jonas Jerebko (12)	Rodney Stuckey (10)	Quicken Loans Arena; 20,562	21–41
63	March 7	Houston	W 110–107 (OT)	Tayshaun Prince (29)	Jason Maxiell (16)	Will Bynum (11)	The Palace of Auburn Hills; 18,422	22–41
64	March 10	Utah	L 104–115	Charlie Villanueva (19)	Jason Maxiell (11)	Richard Hamilton (7)	The Palace of Auburn Hills; 16,908	22–42
65	March 12	Washington	W 101–87	Jonas Jerebko, Tayshaun Prince (18)	Jason Maxiell (10)	Will Bynum (20)	The Palace of Auburn Hills; 20,273	23–42
66	March 13	@ Atlanta	L 99–112	Jason Maxiell (19)	Jason Maxiell (12)	Will Bynum (7)	Philips Arena; 18,214	23–43
67	March 15	@ Boston	L 93–119	Will Bynum (16)	Jason Maxiell (10)	Will Bynum (6)	TD Garden; 18,624	23–44
68	March 16	Cleveland	L 101–113	Richard Hamilton (24)	Jason Maxiell (15)	Tayshaun Prince (8)	The Palace of Auburn Hills; 22,076	23–45
69	March 19	@ Indiana	L 102–106	Rodney Stuckey (25)	Ben Gordon, Ben Wallace (7)	Ben Gordon (6)	Conseco Fieldhouse; 13,583	23–46
70	March 21	@ Cleveland	L 79–104	Jason Maxiell (16)	Jason Maxiell (9)	Will Bynum, Ben Gordon (5)	Quicken Loans Arena; 20,562	23–47
71	March 23	Indiana	L 83–98	Tayshaun Prince (14)	Kwame Brown (15)	Tayshaun Prince (6)	The Palace of Auburn Hills; 17,109	23–48
72	March 26	@ New Jersey	L 110–118	Tayshaun Prince (27)	Jason Maxiell (11)	Tayshaun Prince, Rodney Stuckey (7)	Izod Center; 13,469	23–49
73	March 28	Chicago	L 103–110	Richard Hamilton (29)	Jason Maxiell (10)	Tayshaun Prince (6)	The Palace of Auburn Hills; 22,076	23–50
74	March 31	Miami	L 81–98	Rodney Stuckey (18)	Jonas Jerebko, Tayshaun Prince, Ben Wallace (6)	Tayshaun Prince (6)	The Palace of Auburn Hills; 22,076	23–51

April : 4–4 (home: 1–2; road: 3–2)

Game	Date	Team	Score	High points	High rebounds	High assists	Location Attendance	Record
75	April 2	Phoenix	L 94–109	Ben Gordon (21)	Jonas Jerebko (10)	Will Bynum (6)	The Palace of Auburn Hills; 22,076	23–52
76	April 3	@ Atlanta	L 85–91	Rodney Stuckey (22)	Jonas Jerebko (9)	Ben Gordon, Tayshaun Prince (4)	Philips Arena; 18729	23–53
77	April 6	@ Philadelphia	W 124–103	Charlie Villanueva (25)	Austin Daye (9)	Will Bynum (6)	Wachovia Center; 13,832	24–53
78	April 7	Atlanta	W 90–88	Ben Gordon (22)	Austin Daye (10)	Ben Gordon (7)	The Palace of Auburn Hills; 22,076	25–53
79	April 9	@ Miami	W 106–99	Ben Gordon (39)	Jason Maxiell (7)	Tayshaun Prince (5)	American Airlines Arena; 19,600	26–53
80	April 10	@ Charlotte	L 95–99	Ben Gordon (21)	Ben Wallace (10)	Ben Gordon (7)	Time Warner Cable Arena; 19,328	26–54
81	April 12	Toronto	L 97–111	Ben Gordon (24)	Ben Gordon, Charlie Villanueva (6)	Will Bynum (8)	The Palace of Auburn Hills; 22,076	26–55
82	April 14	@ Minnesota	W 103–98	Tayshaun Prince (20)	Jonas Jerebko (13)	Chucky Atkins (5)	Target Center; 15,790	27–55

2009–10 season schedule

== Player statistics ==
=== Season ===
Player	GP	GS	MPG	FG%	3P%	FT%	RPG	APG	SPG	BPG	PPG
Chucky Atkins	40	11	16.1	.363	.301	.926	.7	2.3	.4	.0	4.0
Kwame Brown	48	1	13.8	.500	.000	.337	3.7	.5	.3	.2	3.3
Will Bynum	63	20	26.5	.444	.218	.798	2.3	4.5	.9	.1	10.0
Austin Daye	69	4	13.3	.464	.305	.821	2.5	.5	.4	.4	5.1
Ben Gordon	62	17	27.9	.416	.321	.861	1.9	2.7	.8	.1	13.8
Richard Hamilton	46	46	33.7	.409	.297	.846	2.7	4.4	.6	.1	18.1
Jonas Jerebko	80	73	27.9	.481	.313	.710	6.0	.7	1.0	.4	9.3
Jason Maxiell	76	29	20.4	.511	.000	.574	5.3	.5	.5	.5	6.8
Tayshaun Prince	49	49	34.0	.486	.370	.714	5.1	3.3	.7	.4	13.5
Rodney Stuckey	73	67	34.2	.405	.228	.833	3.8	4.8	1.4	.2	16.6
DaJuan Summers	44	0	9.2	.354	.357	.711	1.0	.4	.2	.2	3.0
Charlie Villanueva	78	16	23.7	.439	.351	.815	4.7	.7	.6	.7	11.9
Ben Wallace	69	67	28.6	.541	.000	.406	8.7	1.5	1.2	1.2	5.5
Chris Wilcox	34	10	13.0	.525	.000	.500	3.4	.4	.4	.4	4.5

== Transactions ==
Detroit Pistons

Players Added

Via Draft

- Austin Daye
- DaJuan Summers
- Jonas Jerebko

Via Free Agency

- Ben Gordon (From Bulls)
- Charlie Villanueva (From Bucks)
- Chris Wilcox (From Knicks)
Players Lost

Via Free Agency

- Antonio McDyess (To Spurs)
- Rasheed Wallace (To Celtics)
- Wálter Herrmann (To Spain)

Via Trade

- Arron Afflalo (To Nuggets)
- Walter Sharpe (To Nuggets)
- Amir Johnson (To Bucks)

Waived

- Fabricio Oberto

== Awards and records ==
- Jonas Jerebko, NBA All-Rookie Second Team
