= Vernon Macklin =

American basketball player (born 1986)

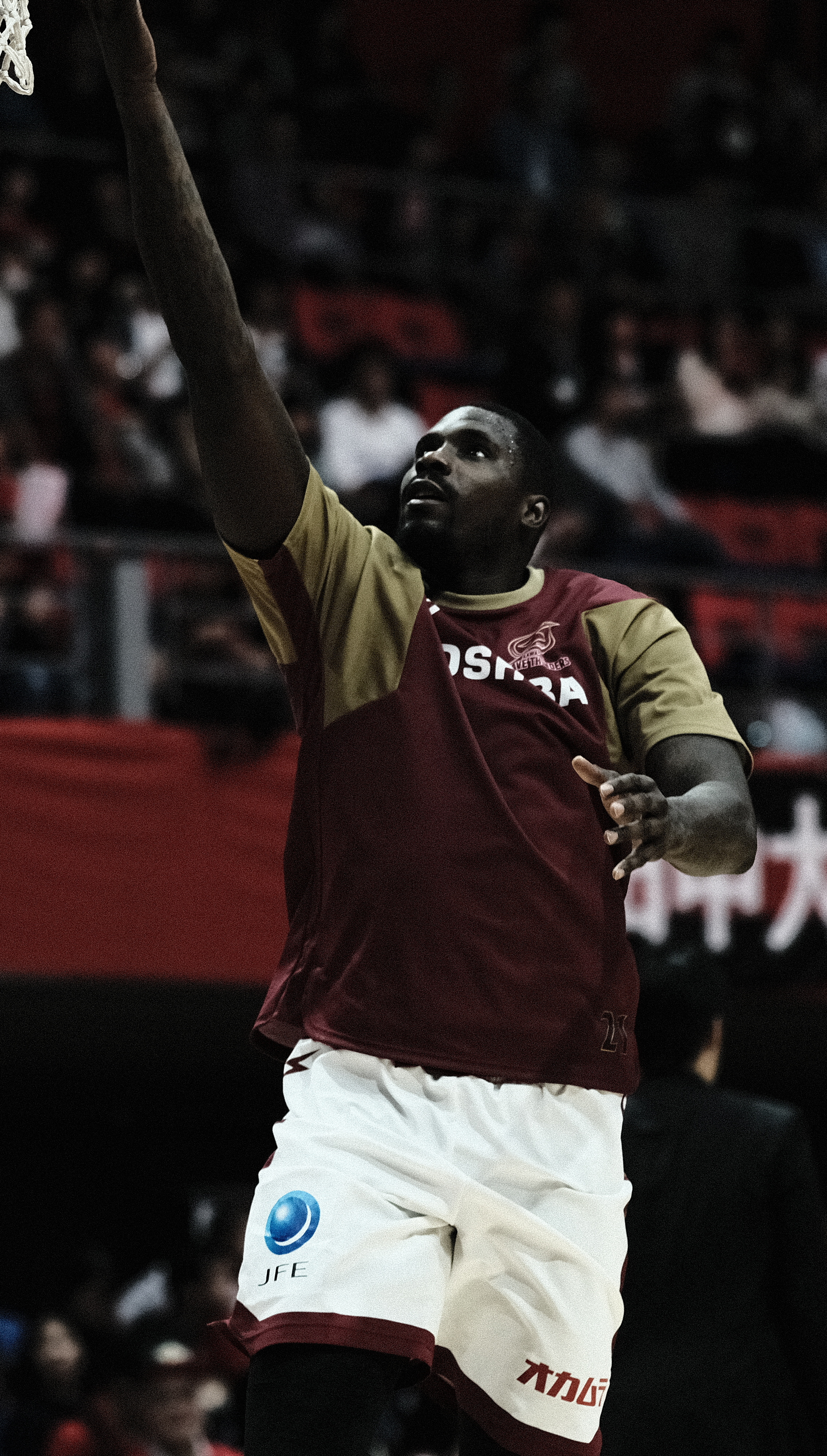

Ulsan Hyundai Mobis Phoebus
- Title: Assistant coach
- League: Korean Basketball League

Personal information
- Born: September 25, 1986 (age 40) Portsmouth, Virginia, U.S.
- Listed height: 6 ft 10 in (2.08 m)
- Listed weight: 227 lb (103 kg)

Career information
- High school: I. C. Norcom (Portsmouth, Virginia); Hargrave Military Academy (Chatham, Virginia)
- College: Georgetown (2006–2008); Florida (2009–2011)
- NBA draft: 2011: 2nd round, 52nd overall pick
- Drafted by: Detroit Pistons
- Playing career: 2011–2021
- Position: Center / power forward
- Coaching career: 2022–present

Career history

Playing
- 2011–2012: Detroit Pistons
- 2012: →Fort Wayne Mad Ants
- 2012: Royal Halı Gaziantep
- 2012–2013: Rio Grande Valley Vipers
- 2013: Barangay Ginebra Kings
- 2013: Liaoning Flying Leopards
- 2014–2017: Al Jaysh
- 2017: Brujos de Guayama
- 2017–2018: Goyang Orion Orions
- 2018: Magnolia Hotshots
- 2018: Wuhan Dangdai
- 2018–2019: Kawasaki Brave Thunders
- 2019: Changwon LG Sakers
- 2021: Ulsan Hyundai Mobis Phoebus

Coaching
- 2022–present: Ulsan Hyundai Mobis Phoebus (assistant)

Career highlights
- Second-team Parade All-American (2006); McDonald's All-American (2006); Virginia Mr. Basketball (2006)
- Stats at NBA.com
- Stats at Basketball Reference

Vernon Leon Macklin (born September 25, 1986) is an American basketball coach and former professional basketball player. He is an assistant coach of the Ulsan Hyundai Mobis in the Korean Basketball League (KBL). Macklin played college basketball for the University of Florida before being drafted was by the Detroit Pistons in the second round of the 2011 NBA draft.

== Early years ==
Macklin was born in Portsmouth, Virginia. He attended I. C. Norcom High School in Portsmouth, where he played for the Norcom Greyhounds high school basketball team for three years. Macklin finished his prep career at Hargrave Military Academy in Chatham, Virginia, while helping the Hargrave Tigers to a 28–2 season and averaging twenty points and fifteen rebounds per game. Following his senior season, he was named a McDonald's All-American. At six feet, ten inches tall, and 210 pounds, Macklin was a five-star recruit at the power forward position. Rivals.com ranked him as the twelfth best overall player and the third best forward in the high school class of 2006. In addition, Macklin was one of only ten players selected for the 2006 USA Basketball Junior National Select Team, which participated in the Nike Hoop Summit.

College recruiting
Name	Hometown	School	Height	Weight	Commit date
Vernon Macklin; PF	Portsmouth, Virginia	Hargrave Military Academy (VA)	6 ft 10 in (2.08 m)	210 lb (95 kg)	Aug 24, 2005
Vernon Macklin; PF	Recruit ratings: Scout: Rivals:				
Overall recruit ranking:
Note: In many cases, Scout, Rivals, 247Sports, On3, and ESPN may conflict in their listings of height and weight.; In these cases, the average was taken. ESPN grades are on a 100-point scale.; Sources: "2006 Team Ranking". Rivals.

== College career ==
Macklin first attended Georgetown University in Washington, D.C., and began his college career as a member of the Georgetown Hoyas men's basketball team. During his two seasons with the Hoyas, he played behind future NBA players Jeff Green and Roy Hibbert. After his sophomore season, he transferred to the University of Florida in Gainesville, Florida, where he played for coach Billy Donovan's Florida Gators men's basketball team. After sitting out the 2008–09 season as required by NCAA transfer rules, he played for the Gators during the 2009–10 and 2010–11 seasons, and started 71 consecutive games. During his senior season, Macklin led the Gators in field goal completion percentage and blocks, and averaged 11.6 points and 5.4 rebounds per game; the Gators won the Southeastern Conference (SEC) regular season championship and advanced to NCAA Tournament Elite Eight.

Macklin graduated from the University of Florida with a bachelor's degree in sociology in 2011.

=== College statistics ===
Year	Team	GP	GS	MPG	FG%	3P%	FT%	RPG	APG	SPG	BPG	PPG
2006–07	Georgetown	31	0	9.8	.741	.000	.435	1.5	.5	.0	.1	2.9
2007–08	Georgetown	34	0	12.8	.598	.000	.250	2.1	.6	.2	.7	3.4
2009–10	Florida	34	34	25.3	.607	.000	.588	5.5	.8	.6	.9	10.6
2010–11	Florida	37	37	24.5	.593	.000	.451	5.4	.8	.4	.7	11.6

== Professional career ==
=== 2011–12 season ===
Macklin was selected with the 52nd overall pick in 2011 NBA draft by the Detroit Pistons. On March 11, 2012, he was assigned to the Fort Wayne Mad Ants of the NBA D-League. On April 9, 2012, he was recalled by the Pistons.

=== 2012–13 season ===
In July 2012, Macklin joined the Pistons for the 2012 NBA Summer League. On August 19, 2012, he signed a one-year deal with Royal Halı Gaziantep of the Turkish Basketball League in August 2012. In November 2012, he was released by Gaziantep after just five games.

On December 18, 2012, Macklin was acquired by the Rio Grande Valley Vipers of the NBA D-League.

On February 14, 2013, he signed with Barangay Ginebra San Miguel as their import for the 2013 Commissioner's Cup. He helped the team reach the Commissioner's Cup final, where they fell 3–0 in a best of 5 series.

=== 2013–14 season ===
In July 2013, Macklin joined the Los Angeles Clippers for the 2013 NBA Summer League.

On December 5, 2013, he signed with Liaoning of the Chinese Basketball Association. Later that month, he left after just seven games.

=== 2014–15 season ===
In July 2014, Macklin joined the Orlando Magic for the 2014 NBA Summer League. On September 26, 2014, he signed with the New Orleans Pelicans. However, he was later waived by the Pelicans on October 9, 2014.

On November 22, 2014, he signed with Al Jaysh of Qatar.

=== 38th William Jones Cup ===
In July 2016, Macklin represented the Philippine club Mighty Sports PH in the 38th William Jones Cup, and later on winning the gold medal for the club with an unbeaten record of 8–0.

=== 2017–18 season ===
In March 2018, Macklin signed with the Magnolia Hotshots of the Philippine Basketball Association as their import for the 2018 PBA Commissioner's Cup.

== Coaching career ==
On July 6, 2022, Macklin announced his retirement from playing basketball on his Instagram account. He became an assistant coach for Ulsan Hyundai Mobis Phoebus in the Korean Basketball League (KBL) starting that year.

== NBA career statistics ==
Legend
GP	Games played	GS	Games started	MPG	Minutes per game
FG%	Field goal percentage	3P%	3-point field goal percentage	FT%	Free throw percentage
RPG	Rebounds per game	APG	Assists per game	SPG	Steals per game
BPG	Blocks per game	PPG	Points per game	**Bold**	Career high

=== Regular season ===
Year	Team	GP	GS	MPG	FG%	3P%	FT%	RPG	APG	SPG	BPG	PPG
2011–12	Detroit	23	0	5.9	.543	.000	.571	1.5	.2	.2	.2	2.0
Career		23	0	5.9	.543	.000	.571	1.5	.2	.2	.2	2.0

== See also ==
- 2006 high school boys basketball All-Americans
- List of Florida Gators in the NBA
