= Rodney Stuckey =

American basketball player (born 1986)

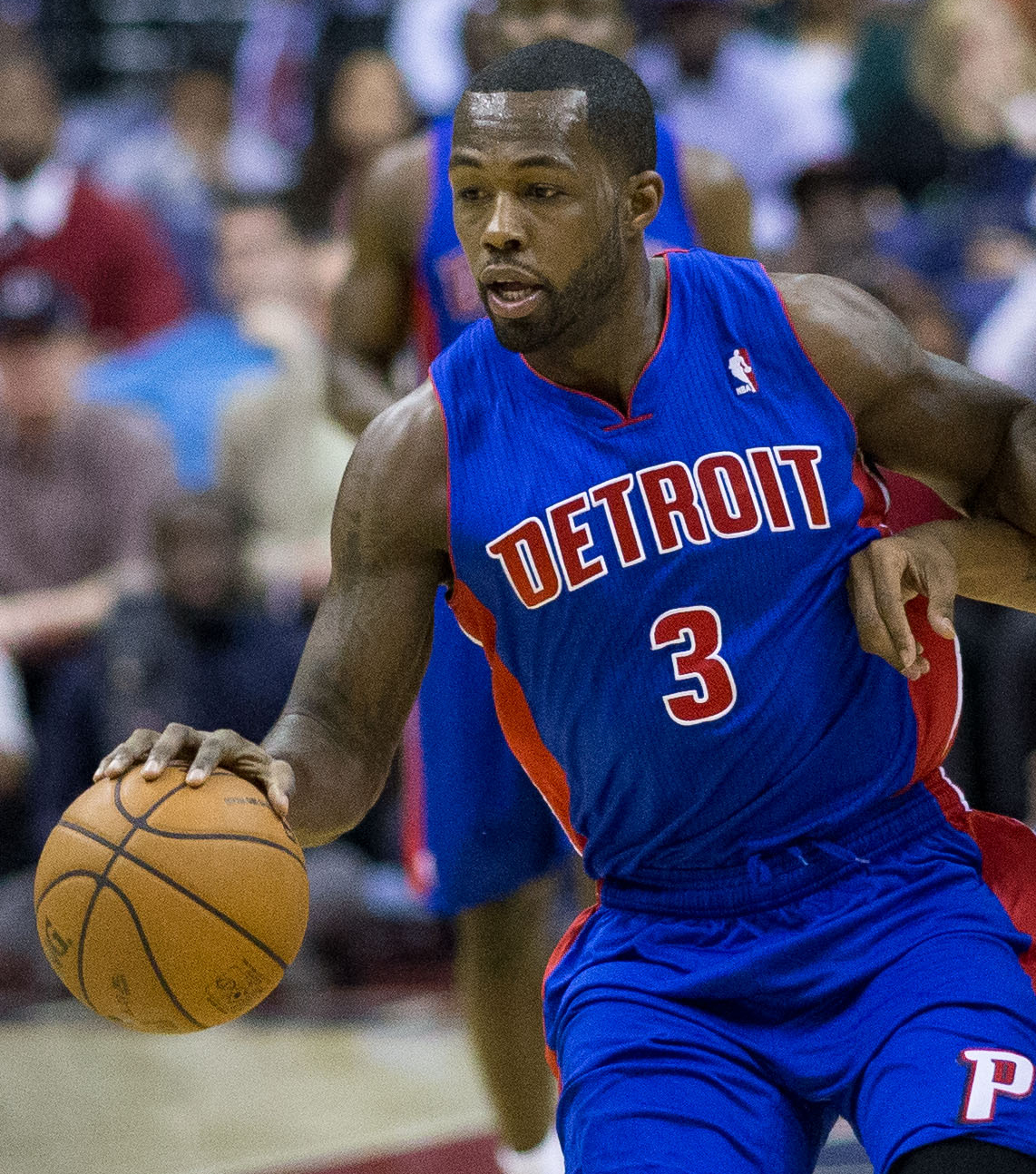
- Stuckey with the Detroit Pistons in 2013

Personal information
- Born: April 21, 1986 (age 40) Seattle, Washington, U.S.
- Listed height: 6 ft 5 in (1.96 m)
- Listed weight: 205 lb (93 kg)

Career information
- High school: Kentwood (Covington, Washington)
- College: Eastern Washington (2005–2007)
- NBA draft: 2007: 1st round, 15th overall pick
- Drafted by: Detroit Pistons
- Playing career: 2007–2017
- Position: Shooting guard / point guard
- Number: 3, 2

Career history
- 2007–2014: Detroit Pistons
- 2014–2017: Indiana Pacers

Career highlights
- NBA All-Rookie Second Team (2008); Big Sky Player of the Year (2006); Big Sky Freshman of the Year (2005); 2× First-team All-Big Sky (2005, 2006); No. 3 retired by Eastern Washington Eagles
- Stats at NBA.com
- Stats at Basketball Reference

Rodney Norvell Stuckey (born April 21, 1986) is an American former professional basketball player. He played seven seasons for the Detroit Pistons and three seasons for the Indiana Pacers and played college basketball for the Eastern Washington Eagles.

== Early life and education ==
Stuckey was born in Seattle and raised in the suburb of Kent. Stuckey prepped at Kentwood High School in Covington, Washington, where he led the Conquerors to a 4A State Title in 2004.

== College career ==
Despite being a highly valued recruit, Stuckey did not academically qualify to play at a premier school, including the University of Washington. Stuckey committed to Eastern Washington University and had to redshirt during his freshman season in order to become academically eligible. As a redshirt freshman, Stuckey averaged 24.2 points (8th in the nation), 4.1 assists, and 2.2 steals per game for the Eagles. As a sophomore, Stuckey averaged 24.6 points (7th in the nation), 5.5 assists, 4.7 rebounds, and 2.4 steals per game. Against Portland State, he scored a season high 36 points. He had nine 30-point games and three 10-assist games. He had a career high 7 steals against Idaho.

In just two seasons, he scored 1,438 points, made 98 3-point field goals, collected 279 rebounds, dished out 283 assists, and collected 145 steals.

On January 11, 2009, Stuckey's No. 3 jersey was retired at half time.

=== College statistics ===
Year	Team	GP	GS	MPG	FG%	3P%	FT%	RPG	APG	SPG	BPG	PPG
2005–06	Eastern Washington	30	30	33.0	.490	.372	.760	4.8	4.1	2.2	0.3	24.2
2006–07	Eastern Washington	29	29	33.3	.453	.267	.846	4.7	5.5	2.4	0.3	24.6

== Professional career ==
=== Detroit Pistons (2007–2014) ===
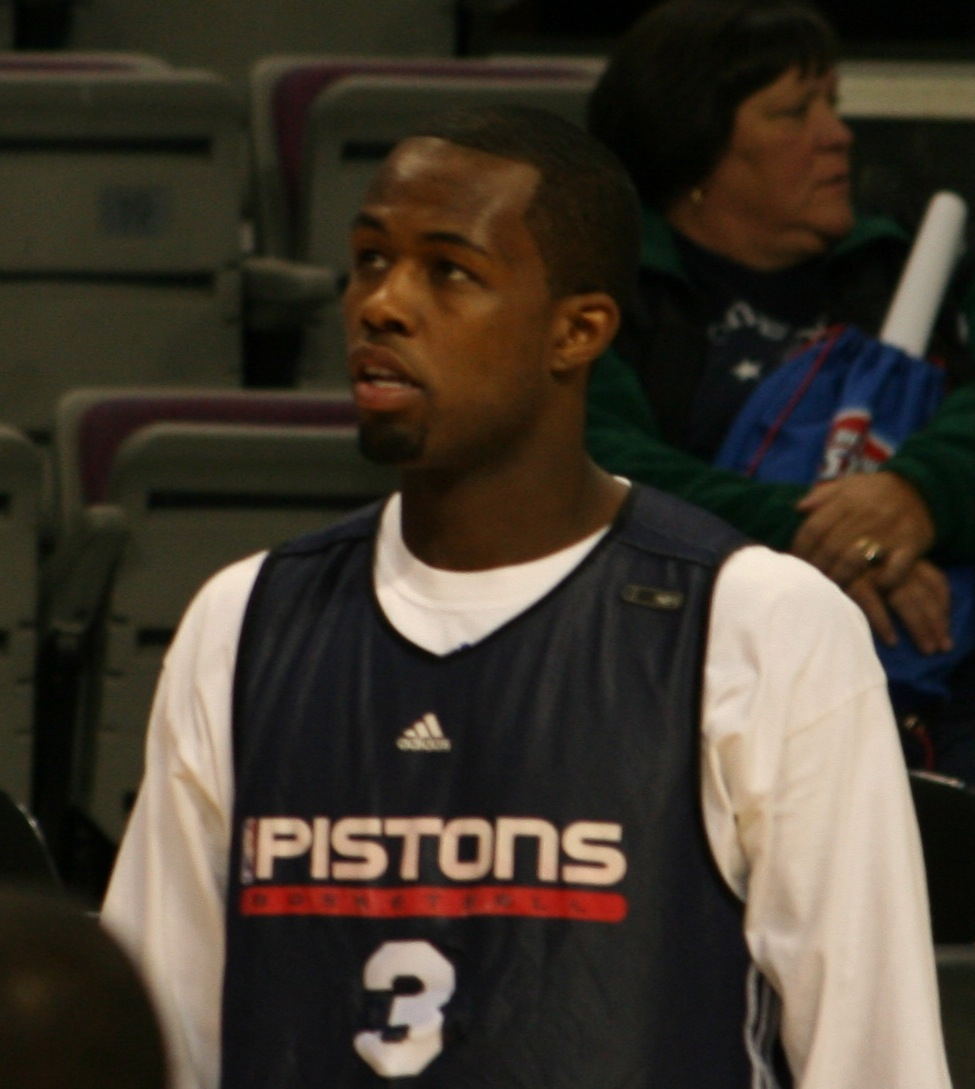
Stuckey with the Detroit Pistons

On June 28, 2007, Stuckey was taken 15th overall in the 2007 NBA draft by the Detroit Pistons. Stuckey got off to a quick start with strong play in summer league and averaged 16.1 PPG, 4.8 RPG and 3 APG in pre-season play before breaking his hand in the final pre-season game. He had left-hand surgery prior to the regular season and was expected to miss 6–8 weeks before making his NBA debut. Stuckey was cleared December 20 to practice and play again, nearly two months after undergoing surgery. He made his professional debut December 21, 2007 against the Memphis Grizzlies and scored 11 points in 6 minutes off the bench.

On May 13, 2008, Stuckey was elected to the NBA NBA All-Rookie Second Team, with 22 ballot votes, including six first-team votes.

During the 2008 NBA Playoffs, Boston Celtics forward Paul Pierce said of Stuckey's performance in game 2, "I thought Stuckey really gave us problems, I think he was the X factor in the game." That night Stuckey came off the bench to score 13 points in 17 minutes helping the Pistons win game 2 in Boston.

Stuckey in action

On December 23, 2008, Stuckey scored a career high 40 points in a win over the Chicago Bulls. He also recorded a career high field goal attempts and made field goals. He also scored 38 points in a win against the Sacramento Kings. He also played in the 2009 Rookie Challenge contest with the sophomore team during All-Star weekend.

On December 13, 2009, Stuckey was named the Eastern Conference Player of the Week for the second time in his career.

=== Indiana Pacers (2014–2017) ===
On July 21, 2014, Stuckey signed with the Indiana Pacers. On March 10, 2015, he scored a season-high 34 points against the Orlando Magic.

On July 21, 2015, Stuckey re-signed with the Pacers to a three-year, $21 million contract. Stuckey missed most of January and February of the 2015–16 season due to a bone bruise in his right foot.

On March 28, 2017, Stuckey was ruled out for four to six weeks with a left patellar tendon strain. He was subsequently waived by the Pacers the following day.

== NBA career statistics ==
Legend
GP	Games played	GS	Games started	MPG	Minutes per game
FG%	Field goal percentage	3P%	3-point field goal percentage	FT%	Free throw percentage
RPG	Rebounds per game	APG	Assists per game	SPG	Steals per game
BPG	Blocks per game	PPG	Points per game	**Bold**	Career high

=== Regular season ===
Year	Team	GP	GS	MPG	FG%	3P%	FT%	RPG	APG	SPG	BPG	PPG
2007–08	Detroit	57	2	19.0	.401	.188	.814	2.3	2.8	.9	.1	7.6
2008–09	Detroit	**79**	65	31.9	.439	.295	.803	3.5	4.9	1.0	.1	13.4
2009–10	Detroit	73	**67**	**34.2**	.405	.228	.833	**3.8**	4.8	**1.4**	**.2**	**16.6**
2010–11	Detroit	70	54	31.2	.439	.289	**.866**	3.1	**5.2**	1.1	.1	15.5
2011–12	Detroit	55	48	29.9	.429	.317	.834	2.6	3.8	.8	**.2**	14.8
2012–13	Detroit	76	24	28.6	.406	.302	.783	2.8	3.6	.7	**.2**	11.5
2013–14	Detroit	73	5	26.7	.436	.273	.836	2.3	2.1	.7	.1	13.9
2014–15	Indiana	71	36	26.4	**.440**	**.390**	.819	3.5	3.1	.8	.1	12.6
2015–16	Indiana	58	1	22.0	.413	.241	.829	2.7	2.4	.7	.1	8.9
2016–17	Indiana	39	0	17.8	.373	.317	.748	2.2	2.2	.4	.0	7.2
Career		612	302	28.1	.425	.298	.827	3.0	3.7	.9	.2	12.9

=== Playoffs ===
Year	Team	GP	GS	MPG	FG%	3P%	FT%	RPG	APG	SPG	BPG	PPG
2008	Detroit	**17**	2	22.4	.371	.286	**.879**	1.9	3.4	**1.1**	**.1**	8.2
2009	Detroit	4	**4**	**32.0**	.393	.000	.857	**2.3**	**5.3**	.0	.0	**15.0**
2016	Indiana	7	0	17.9	**.395**	**.500**	.556	2.1	2.0	.6	**.1**	6.3
Career		28	6	22.6	.382	.280	.840	2.0	3.3	.8	.1	8.7

== Personal life ==
In May 2014, Stuckey became engaged to Cassandra Ferguson, a contestant on the 18th season of The Bachelor. The couple have a son named Trey.
