= 2010–11 Detroit Pistons season =

NBA team season

- Head coach: John Kuester
- President: Joe Dumars
- General manager: Joe Dumars
- Owner: Karen Davidson
- Arena: The Palace of Auburn Hills

Results
- Record: 30–52 (.366)
- Place: Division: 4th (Central); Conference: 11th (Eastern)
- Playoff finish: Did not qualify
- Stats at Basketball Reference

Local media
- Television: Fox Sports Detroit
- Radio: WWJ; WXYT-AM; FM

The 2010–11 Detroit Pistons season was the 70th season of the franchise, the 63rd in the National Basketball Association (NBA), and the 54th in the Detroit area.

== Draft picks ==
Round	Pick	Player	Position	Nationality	College/Team
1	7	Greg Monroe	F/C	United States	Georgetown
2	36	Terrico White	G	United States	Ole Miss

== Roster ==
2010–11 Detroit Pistons roster
Players

Pos.	No.	Player	Height	Weight	DOB	From
PG	12	Will Bynum	6 ft 0 in (1.83 m)	185 lb (84 kg)	1983-01-04	Georgia Tech
SF	5	Austin Daye	6 ft 11 in (2.11 m)	200 lb (91 kg)	1988-06-05	Gonzaga
SG	7	Ben Gordon	6 ft 3 in (1.91 m)	200 lb (91 kg)	1983-04-04	Connecticut
SG	32	Richard Hamilton	6 ft 7 in (2.01 m)	193 lb (88 kg)	1978-02-14	Connecticut
PF	33	Jonas Jerebko (injured)	6 ft 10 in (2.08 m)	231 lb (105 kg)	1987-03-02	Sweden
PF	54	Jason Maxiell	6 ft 7 in (2.01 m)	260 lb (118 kg)	1983-02-18	Cincinnati
SG	1	Tracy McGrady	6 ft 8 in (2.03 m)	223 lb (101 kg)	1979-05-24	Mt. Zion Christian Academy
C	10	Greg Monroe	6 ft 11 in (2.11 m)	250 lb (113 kg)	1990-06-04	Georgetown
SF	22	Tayshaun Prince	6 ft 9 in (2.06 m)	215 lb (98 kg)	1980-02-28	Kentucky
PG	3	Rodney Stuckey	6 ft 5 in (1.96 m)	205 lb (93 kg)	1986-04-21	Eastern Washington
SF	35	DaJuan Summers	6 ft 8 in (2.03 m)	240 lb (109 kg)	1988-01-24	Georgetown
PF	31	Charlie Villanueva	6 ft 11 in (2.11 m)	232 lb (105 kg)	1984-08-24	Connecticut
C	6	Ben Wallace	6 ft 9 in (2.06 m)	240 lb (109 kg)	1974-09-10	Virginia Union
PF	9	Chris Wilcox	6 ft 10 in (2.08 m)	235 lb (107 kg)	1982-09-03	Maryland

Coaches
Head coach
- John Kuester
Assistant(s)
- Brian Hill
- Bill Pope
- Pat Sullivan
- Darrell Walker
- Mike Abdenour (trainer)

Legend
- (DP) Unsigned draft pick
- (FA) Free agent
- (S) Suspended
- Injured

Roster
Updated: August 16, 2010

== Pre-season ==
=== Game log ===
2010 pre-season game log
Pre-season: 3–5 (home: 3–2; road: 0–3)

Game	Date	Team	Score	High points	High rebounds	High assists	Location Attendance	Record
1	October 5	@ Miami	L 89–105	Ben Gordon (17)	Ben Gordon, Charlie Villanueva (5)	Rodney Stuckey (5)	American Airlines Arena; 19,600	0–1
2	October 8	Milwaukee	W 115–110 (OT)	Austin Daye (21)	Austin Daye (7)	Will Bynum (9)	The Palace of Auburn Hills; 12,821	1–1
3	October 11	Atlanta	W 94–85	Rodney Stuckey (16)	Greg Monroe (7)	Richard Hamilton (7)	The Palace of Auburn Hills; 10,591	2–1
4	October 13	Dallas	L 96–101	Austin Daye (16)	Ben Wallace, Jason Maxiell (8)	Rodney Stuckey (6)	Van Andel Arena; 10,207	2–2
5	October 15	@ Minnesota	L 88–99	Austin Daye (18)	Austin Daye (11)	Will Bynum (5)	Carrier Dome; 11,747	2–3
6	October 16	@ Charlotte	L 94–97	Rodney Stuckey (25)	Greg Monroe (8)	Rodney Stuckey, Will Bynum (5)	Colonial Life Arena; 6,847	2–4
7	October 19	Washington	W 98–92	Rodney Stuckey (34)	Ben Wallace (11)	Rodney Stuckey (7)	Huntington Center; 6,424	3–4
8	October 22	Memphis	L 103–106	Austin Daye (22)	Ben Wallace (8)	Rodney Stuckey (7)	The Palace of Auburn Hills; 18,528	3–5

2010–11 season schedule

== Regular season ==
=== Standings ===
Central Division	W	L	PCT	GB	Home	Road	Div
z-Chicago Bulls	62	20	.756	–	36–5	26–15	15–1
x-Indiana Pacers	37	45	.451	25	24–17	13–28	9–7
Milwaukee Bucks	35	47	.427	27	22–19	13–28	6–10
Detroit Pistons	30	52	.366	32	21–20	9–32	7–9
Cleveland Cavaliers	19	63	.232	43	12–29	7–34	3–13

#	Eastern Conference				
#	Team	W	L	PCT	GB
1	z-Chicago Bulls	62	20	.756	–
2	y-Miami Heat	58	24	.707	4
3	y-Boston Celtics	56	26	.683	6
4	x-Orlando Magic	52	30	.634	10
5	x-Atlanta Hawks	44	38	.537	18
6	x-New York Knicks	42	40	.512	20
7	x-Philadelphia 76ers	41	41	.500	21
8	x-Indiana Pacers	37	45	.451	25
9	Milwaukee Bucks	35	47	.427	27
10	Charlotte Bobcats	34	48	.415	28
11	Detroit Pistons	30	52	.366	32
12	New Jersey Nets	24	58	.293	38
13	Washington Wizards	23	59	.280	39
14	Toronto Raptors	22	60	.268	40
15	Cleveland Cavaliers	19	63	.232	43

=== Game log ===
2010–11 game log
Total: 30–52 (Home: 21–20; Road: 9–32)
October: 0–3 (home: 0–1; road: 0–2)

Game	Date	Team	Score	High points	High rebounds	High assists	Location Attendance	Record
1	October 27	@ New Jersey	L 98–101	Tayshaun Prince, Rodney Stuckey, Charlie Villanueva (14)	Ben Wallace (10)	Rodney Stuckey (7)	Prudential Center; 15,178	0–1
2	October 29	Oklahoma City	L 104–105	Ben Gordon (32)	Ben Wallace (8)	Rodney Stuckey (9)	The Palace of Auburn Hills; 22,076	0–2
3	October 30	@ Chicago	L 91–101	Ben Gordon (21)	Ben Wallace (13)	Rodney Stuckey (7)	United Center; 21,038	0–3

November: 6–9 (home: 4–3; road: 2–6)

Game	Date	Team	Score	High points	High rebounds	High assists	Location Attendance	Record
4	November 2	Boston	L 86–109	Charlie Villanueva (17)	Ben Wallace (8)	Ben Gordon (4)	The Palace of Auburn Hills; 15,313	0–4
5	November 3	@ Atlanta	L 85–94	Ben Gordon (22)	Greg Monroe (8)	Ben Gordon (4)	Philips Arena; 13,003	0–5
6	November 5	Charlotte	W 97–90	Ben Gordon (20)	Ben Wallace, Greg Monroe (6)	Ben Wallace (4)	The Palace of Auburn Hills; 13,291	1–5
7	November 7	Golden State	W 102–97	Richard Hamilton (27)	Charlie Villanueva (10)	Rodney Stuckey (9)	The Palace of Auburn Hills; 12,813	2–5
8	November 9	@ Portland	L 78–100	Rodney Stuckey (17)	Austin Daye (8)	Richard Hamilton (4)	Rose Garden; 20,556	2–6
9	November 12	@ L.A. Clippers	W 113–107	Charlie Villanueva (30)	Tayshaun Prince (8)	Rodney Stuckey (6)	Staples Center; 16,960	3–6
10	November 14	@ Sacramento	W 100–94	Rodney Stuckey (17)	Ben Wallace (10)	Rodney Stuckey (7)	ARCO Arena; 12,377	4–6
11	November 15	@ Golden State	L 97–101	Charlie Villanueva (18)	Rodney Stuckey, Charlie Villanueva (8)	Rodney Stuckey (6)	Oracle Arena; 19,123	4–7
12	November 17	L.A. Lakers	L 90–103	Rodney Stuckey (18)	Ben Wallace (8)	Ben Gordon (7)	The Palace of Auburn Hills; 20,284	4–8
13	November 21	Washington	W 115–110 (OT)	Richard Hamilton (27)	Charlie Villanueva (11)	Rodney Stuckey (7)	The Palace of Auburn Hills; 13,241	5–8
14	November 23	@ Dallas	L 84–88	Tayshaun Prince, Rodney Stuckey (19)	Greg Monroe (8)	Tracy McGrady (4)	American Airlines Center; 19,734	5–9
15	November 24	@ Memphis	L 84–105	Rodney Stuckey (17)	Greg Monroe (8)	Tracy McGrady (4)	FedExForum; 11,283	5–10
16	November 26	Milwaukee	W 103–89	Rodney Stuckey (18)	Charlie Villanueva, Ben Wallace (8)	Richard Hamilton (9)	The Palace of Auburn Hills; 17,133	6–10
17	November 28	New York	L 116–125 (2OT)	Tayshaun Prince (31)	Tayshaun Prince (8)	Tayshaun Prince (7)	The Palace of Auburn Hills; 16,015	6–11
18	November 30	@ Orlando	L 79–90	Tayshaun Prince (16)	Ben Wallace (9)	Rodney Stuckey (5)	Amway Center; 18,846	6–12

December: 5–9 (home: 4–3; road: 1–6)

Game	Date	Team	Score	High points	High rebounds	High assists	Location Attendance	Record
19	December 1	@ Miami	L 72–97	Greg Monroe (15)	Greg Monroe (8)	Will Bynum, Ben Gordon, Richard Hamilton, Tayshaun Prince (2)	American Airlines Arena; 19,600	6–13
20	December 3	Orlando	L 91–104	Tayshaun Prince (30)	Ben Gordon (9)	Rodney Stuckey (7)	The Palace of Auburn Hills; 18,433	6–14
21	December 5	Cleveland	W 102–92	Richard Hamilton (27)	Ben Wallace (9)	Rodney Stuckey (11)	The Palace of Auburn Hills; 13,081	7–14
22	December 7	@ Houston	L 83–97	Rodney Stuckey (18)	Tayshaun Prince, Ben Wallace (8)	Rodney Stuckey (5)	Toyota Center; 14,798	7–15
23	December 8	@ New Orleans	L 74–93	Ben Gordon (19)	Ben Wallace (7)	Tracy McGrady (3)	New Orleans Arena; 10,823	7–16
24	December 10	@ Minnesota	L 99–109	Richard Hamilton (26)	Greg Monroe (15)	Rodney Stuckey (6)	Target Center; 13,988	7–17
25	December 11	Toronto	L 116–120	Rodney Stuckey, Ben Wallace (23)	Ben Wallace (14)	Rodney Stuckey (12)	The Palace of Auburn Hills; 13,343	7–18
26	December 14	Atlanta	W 103–80	Richard Hamilton (24)	Charlie Villanueva (11)	Rodney Stuckey (10)	The Palace of Auburn Hills; 12,526	8–18
27	December 17	L.A. Clippers	L 88–109	Charlie Villanueva (18)	Charlie Villanueva (9)	Tracy McGrady (5)	The Palace of Auburn Hills; 16,046	8–19
28	December 19	New Orleans	W 111–108 (OT)	Tayshaun Prince (28)	Tayshaun Prince (12)	Will Bynum (9)	The Palace of Auburn Hills; 16,452	9–19
29	December 22	@ Toronto	W 115–93	Richard Hamilton (35)	Tracy McGrady (7)	Tracy McGrady (7)	Air Canada Centre; 15,303	10–19
30	December 26	Chicago	L 92–95 (OT)	Tayshaun Prince (17)	Charlie Villanueva (10)	Tayshaun Prince (6)	The Palace of Auburn Hills; 20,765	10–20
31	December 27	@ Charlotte	L 100–105	Charlie Villanueva (25)	Chris Wilcox (8)	Will Bynum (7)	Time Warner Cable Arena; 14,418	10–21
32	December 29	Boston	W 104–92	Tracy McGrady (21)	Chris Wilcox (8)	Tracy McGrady (8)	The Palace of Auburn Hills; 22,076	11–21
33	December 31	@ Phoenix	L 75–92	Ben Gordon (19)	Austin Daye (8)	Ben Gordon, Tayshaun Prince (3)	US Airways Center; 17,637	11–22

January: 6–9 (home: 4–2; road: 2–7)

Game	Date	Team	Score	High points	High rebounds	High assists	Location Attendance	Record
34	January 3	@ Utah	L 97–102	Tayshaun Prince (26)	Tracy McGrady (9)	Tracy McGrady (11)	EnergySolutions Arena; 19,911	11–23
35	January 4	@ L.A. Lakers	L 83–108	Tracy McGrady, Greg Monroe (14)	Greg Monroe (11)	Tracy McGrady (6)	Staples Center; 18,997	11–24
36	January 8	Philadelphia	W 112–109 (OT)	Tayshaun Prince (23)	Greg Monroe (13)	Tracy McGrady (7)	The Palace of Auburn Hills; 20,038	12–24
37	January 10	@ Chicago	L 82–95	Tayshaun Prince (15)	Greg Monroe (11)	Rodney Stuckey (4)	United Center; 21,407	12–25
38	January 12	Memphis	L 99–107	Ben Gordon (25)	Greg Monroe (11)	Rodney Stuckey (6)	The Palace of Auburn Hills; 13,068	12–26
39	January 14	@ Toronto	W 101–95	Tracy McGrady (22)	Chris Wilcox (12)	Tracy McGrady (5)	Air Canada Centre; 16,924	13–26
40	January 15	Sacramento	W 110–106	Tayshaun Prince (21)	Greg Monroe (7)	Will Bynum (7)	The Palace of Auburn Hills; 18,784	14–26
41	January 17	Dallas	W 103–89	Rodney Stuckey (20)	Greg Monroe (9)	Rodney Stuckey (6)	The Palace of Auburn Hills; 12,660	15–26
42	January 19	@ Boston	L 82–86	Rodney Stuckey (15)	Greg Monroe (9)	Tracy McGrady (7)	TD Garden; 18,624	15–27
43	January 21	@ New Jersey	L 74–89	Tayshaun Prince (16)	Greg Monroe (10)	Tracy McGrady (6)	Prudential Center; 13,316	15–28
44	January 22	Phoenix	W 75–74	Tayshaun Prince (17)	Tayshaun Prince (13)	Tayshaun Prince (5)	The Palace of Auburn Hills; 21,326	16–28
45	January 24	@ Orlando	W 103–96	Austin Daye, Tracy McGrady, Tayshaun Prince (20)	Ben Wallace (11)	Tayshaun Prince (6)	Amway Center; 19,098	17–28
46	January 26	Denver	L 100–109	Will Bynum (19)	Ben Wallace (10)	Tracy McGrady (8)	The Palace of Auburn Hills; 16,212	17–29
47	January 28	@ Miami	L 87–88	Ben Gordon (21)	Chris Wilcox (10)	Tracy McGrady (10)	American Airlines Arena; 19,805	17–30
48	January 30	@ New York	L 106–124	Ben Gordon (35)	Greg Monroe (17)	Chris Wilcox (4)	Madison Square Garden; 19,763	17–31

February: 5–8 (home: 3–6; road: 2–2)

Game	Date	Team	Score	High points	High rebounds	High assists	Location Attendance	Record
49	February 2	Charlotte	L 87–97	Ben Gordon (20)	Greg Monroe (8)	Tracy McGrady (8)	The Palace of Auburn Hills; 14,376	17–32
50	February 4	New Jersey	W 92–82	Tayshaun Prince (22)	Greg Monroe (11)	Ben Gordon, Tracy McGrady, Tayshaun Prince (4)	The Palace of Auburn Hills; 17,304	18–32
51	February 5	@ Milwaukee	W 89–78	Tracy McGrady (20)	Tayshaun Prince (11)	Will Bynum (4)	Bradley Center; 15,791	19–32
52	February 8	San Antonio	L 89–100	Will Bynum (21)	Greg Monroe (13)	Tracy McGrady, Rodney Stuckey (3)	The Palace of Auburn Hills; 16,132	19–33
53	February 9	@ Cleveland	W 103–94	Rodney Stuckey (22)	Ben Wallace (9)	Will Bynum (7)	Quicken Loans Arena; 19,475	20–33
54	February 11	Miami	L 92–106	Austin Daye (18)	Ben Gordon (7)	Will Bynum (5)	The Palace of Auburn Hills; 22,076	20–34
55	February 13	Portland	L 100–105	Ben Gordon (18)	Ben Wallace (8)	Rodney Stuckey (7)	The Palace of Auburn Hills; 15,257	20–35
56	February 14	Atlanta	L 79–94	Tracy McGrady (14)	Ben Wallace (7)	Will Bynum (7)	The Palace of Auburn Hills; 11,844	20–36
57	February 16	Indiana	W 115–109 (OT)	Tayshaun Prince (25)	Tayshaun Prince (11)	Will Bynum (7)	The Palace of Auburn Hills; 12,551	21–36
All-Star Break
58	February 22	Houston	L 100–108	Will Bynum (21)	Greg Monroe (12)	Will Bynum (6)	The Palace of Auburn Hills; 12,353	21–37
59	February 23	@ Indiana	L 101–102	Greg Monroe (27)	Greg Monroe (12)	Tracy McGrady (12)	Conseco Fieldhouse; 12,214	21–38
60	February 25	@ Philadelphia	L 94–110	Will Bynum (29)	Greg Monroe (11)	Will Bynum (6)	Wells Fargo Center; 15,105	21–39
61	February 26	Utah	W 120–116	Rodney Stuckey (28)	Greg Monroe (16)	Will Bynum, Rodney Stuckey (8)	The Palace of Auburn Hills; 18,564	22–39

March: 4–9 (home: 4–2; road: 0–7)

Game	Date	Team	Score	High points	High rebounds	High assists	Location Attendance	Record
62	March 1	@ Milwaukee	L 90–92	Rodney Stuckey (25)	Greg Monroe, Charlie Villanueva (9)	Rodney Stuckey (5)	Bradley Center; 11,364	22–40
63	March 2	Minnesota	L 105–116	Austin Daye (22)	Greg Monroe (11)	Rodney Stuckey (10)	The Palace of Auburn Hills; 13,122	22–41
64	March 6	Washington	W 113–102	Tayshaun Prince (20)	Greg Monroe, Rodney Stuckey (7)	Rodney Stuckey (9)	The Palace of Auburn Hills; 17,506	23–41
65	March 9	@ San Antonio	L 104–111	Richard Hamilton (20)	Greg Monroe (10)	Tracy McGrady (9)	AT&T Center; 18,581	23–42
66	March 11	@ Oklahoma City	L 94–104	Richard Hamilton (20)	Greg Monroe (10)	Greg Monroe, Rodney Stuckey (6)	Oklahoma City Arena; 18,203	23–43
67	March 12	@ Denver	L 101–131	Chris Wilcox (21)	Austin Daye, Ben Gordon, Greg Monroe (6)	Will Bynum (10)	Pepsi Center; 19,155	23–44
68	March 16	Toronto	W 107–93	Richard Hamilton (24)	Greg Monroe (10)	Rodney Stuckey (14)	The Palace of Auburn Hills; 15,166	24–44
69	March 18	New York	W 99–95	Tayshaun Prince (16)	Chris Wilcox (12)	Will Bynum (5)	The Palace of Auburn Hills; 22,076	25–44
70	March 20	@ Atlanta	L 96–104	Rodney Stuckey (22)	Greg Monroe (10)	Rodney Stuckey (8)	Philips Arena; 17,580	25–45
71	March 23	Miami	L 94–100	Richard Hamilton (27)	Greg Monroe (12)	Rodney Stuckey (6)	The Palace of Auburn Hills; 22,076	25–46
72	March 25	@ Cleveland	L 91–97	Richard Hamilton, Tayshaun Prince (15)	Chris Wilcox, Greg Monroe (8)	Rodney Stuckey (4)	Quicken Loans Arena; 19,907	25–47
73	March 26	Indiana	W 100–88	Richard Hamilton (23)	Greg Monroe (13)	Richard Hamilton, Rodney Stuckey (6)	The Palace of Auburn Hills; 19,216	26–47
74	March 30	@ Indiana	L 101–111	Rodney Stuckey (24)	Greg Monroe (9)	Rodney Stuckey (9)	Conseco Fieldhouse; 9,390	26–48

April: 4–4 (home: 2–2; road: 2–2)

Game	Date	Team	Score	High points	High rebounds	High assists	Location Attendance	Record
75	April 1	Chicago	L 96–101	Richard Hamilton (30)	Greg Monroe (9)	Tayshaun Prince (6)	The Palace of Auburn Hills; 22,076	26–49
76	April 3	@ Boston	L 90–101	Will Bynum (20)	Greg Monroe, Charlie Villanueva, Chris Wilcox (5)	Richard Hamilton, Greg Monroe (5)	TD Garden; 18,624	26–50
77	April 5	@ Washington	L 105–107	Greg Monroe (22)	Greg Monroe (14)	Tracy McGrady (6)	Verizon Center; 18,131	26–51
78	April 6	New Jersey	W 116–109	Richard Hamilton (25)	Greg Monroe (10)	Rodney Stuckey (10)	The Palace of Auburn Hills; 14,554	27–51
79	April 8	Milwaukee	W 110–100	Chris Wilcox (27)	Chris Wilcox (13)	Richard Hamilton (6)	The Palace of Auburn Hills; 16,266	28–51
80	April 10	@ Charlotte	W 112–101	Rodney Stuckey (24)	Greg Monroe (9)	Rodney Stuckey (11)	Time Warner Cable Arena; 16,234	29–51
81	April 11	Cleveland	L 101–110	Rodney Stuckey (29)	Jason Maxiell (14)	Rodney Stuckey (14)	The Palace of Auburn Hills; 15,589	29–52
82	April 13	@ Philadelphia	W 104–100	Rodney Stuckey (29)	Greg Monroe (13)	Rodney Stuckey (8)	Wells Fargo Center; 13,760	30–52

2010–11 season schedule

== Player statistics ==
Legend
GP	Games played	GS	Games started	MPG	Minutes per game
FG%	Field-goal percentage	3P%	3-point field-goal percentage	FT%	Free-throw percentage
RPG	Rebounds per game	APG	Assists per game	SPG	Steals per game
BPG	Blocks per game	PPG	Points per game

=== Season ===
Player	GP	GS	MPG	FG%	3P%	FT%	RPG	APG	SPG	BPG	PPG
Will Bynum	61	5	18.4	.448	.320	.836	1.2	3.2	0.9	0.1	7.9
Austin Daye	72	16	20.1	.410	.401	.759	3.8	1.1	0.5	0.5	7.5
Ben Gordon	82	27	26.0	.440	.402	.850	2.4	2.1	0.6	0.2	11.2
Richard Hamilton	55	39	27.2	.429	.382	.849	2.3	3.1	0.7	0.1	14.1
Jason Maxiell	57	14	16.3	.492	.0	.515	3.0	0.3	0.4	0.4	4.2
Tracy McGrady	72	39	23.4	.442	.341	.698	3.5	3.5	0.9	0.5	8.0
Greg Monroe	80	48	27.8	.551	.0	.622	7.5	1.3	1.2	0.6	9.4
Tayshaun Prince	78	78	32.8	.473	.347	.702	4.2	2.8	0.4	0.5	14.1
Rodney Stuckey	70	54	31.2	.439	.289	.866	3.1	5.2	1.1	0.1	15.5
DaJuan Summers	22	1	9.0	.406	.429	.450	0.5	0.1	0.1	.0	3.4
Charlie Villanueva	76	11	21.9	.442	.387	.767	3.9	0.6	0.6	0.6	11.1
Ben Wallace	54	49	22.9	.450	.500	.333	6.5	1.3	1.0	1.0	2.9
Chris Wilcox	57	29	17.5	.581	.000	.562	4.8	0.8	0.5	0.3	7.4

==== Additions ====
Player	Signed	Former Team
Will Bynum	Signed 3 Year Contract For $10.5 Million	Detroit Pistons
Ben Wallace	Signed 2 Year Contract For $3.8 Million	Detroit Pistons
Tracy McGrady	Signed 1 Year Contract For $1.35 Million	New York Knicks

==== Subtractions ====
Player	Reason Left	New Team
Kwame Brown	Free Agent	Charlotte Bobcats
