= Walker Russell Jr. =

American basketball player (born 1982)

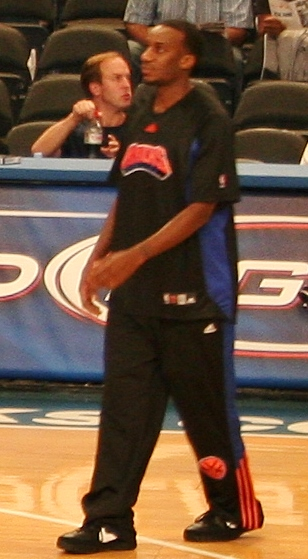
- Russell in 2007

Personal information
- Born: October 6, 1982 (age 43) Pontiac, Michigan, U.S.
- Listed height: 6 ft 0 in (1.83 m)
- Listed weight: 175 lb (79 kg)

Career information
- High school: Rochester (Rochester, Michigan)
- College: Chipola (2002–2003); Jacksonville State (2003–2006)
- NBA draft: 2006: undrafted
- Playing career: 2006–2016
- Position: Point guard
- Number: 23

Career history
- 2006–2007: ČEZ Nymburk
- 2007: Fort Worth Flyers
- 2007–2009: Fort Wayne Mad Ants
- 2008: Estudiantes
- 2009–2010: Lukoil Academic
- 2010: Piratas de Quebradillas
- 2010–2012: Fort Wayne Mad Ants
- 2011: Zhejiang Lions
- 2011: Leones de Santo Domingo
- 2012: Detroit Pistons
- 2012–2014: Reno Bighorns
- 2013: Cocodrilos de Caracas
- 2013–2015: Leones de Santo Domingo
- 2014: Apollon Limassol
- 2014–2015: Westchester Knicks
- 2016: Vaqueros de Bayamón

Career highlights
- LNB champion (2011); 3× NBA D-League All-Star (2009, 2011, 2012); First-team All-OVC (2006); Second-team All-OVC (2005)
- Stats at NBA.com
- Stats at Basketball Reference

Walker Dwayne Russell Jr. (born October 6, 1982) is an American former professional basketball player who played as a point guard. A native of Pontiac, Michigan, he played college basketball for Chipola College and Jacksonville State University. He currently serves as an assistant coach for the Motor City Cruise of the NBA G League.

== Professional career ==
=== 2006–07 season ===
After going undrafted in the 2006 NBA draft, Russell joined the New York Knicks for the 2006 NBA Summer League. He later signed with ČEZ Nymburk of the Czech Republic for the 2006–07 season. In February 2007, he left Nymburk and joined the Fort Worth Flyers the following month.

=== 2007–08 season ===
In July 2007, Russell joined the Detroit Pistons for the 2007 NBA Summer League. On October 1, 2007, he signed with the New York Knicks but he was later waived on October 25. In November 2007, he joined the Fort Wayne Mad Ants where he played 17 games before leaving the club in January 2008 to sign with MMT Estudiantes Madrid of Spain for the rest of the season.

=== 2008–09 season ===
In November 2008, Russell returned to the Fort Wayne Mad Ants where he went on to average 16.1 points and 10.8 assists per game in 2008–09.

=== 2009–10 season ===
In July 2009, Russell joined the NBA D-League Select team for the 2009 NBA Summer League. He later signed with Lukoil Academic of Bulgaria for the 2009–10 season but was later released in January 2010 after appearing in 10 games.

In February 2010, he joined Piratas de Quebradillas for the 2010 BSN season but was released by the club in March after just seven games.

=== 2010–11 season ===
On August 6, 2010, Russell signed with the Gießen 46ers of Germany for the 2010–11 season. He was later released by the club before appearing in a game for them.

On October 30, 2010, he was reacquired by the Fort Wayne Mad Ants and went on to play 37 games for the club in 2010–11. On February 28, 2011, he terminated his contract with Fort Wayne and signed with the Zhejiang Lions for the 2011 CBA playoffs.

=== 2011–12 season ===
In July 2011, Russell joined Leones de Santo Domingo for the 2011 LNB season. He went on to help Leones win the 2011 championship.

After starting the 2011–12 season with the Fort Wayne Mad Ants, Russell signed with the Detroit Pistons on December 12 following the conclusion of the NBA lockout. However, he was later waived by the Pistons on December 21 and returned to Fort Wayne. Then, on January 20, Russell re-signed with the Pistons for the rest of the season.

=== 2012–13 season ===
In July 2012, Russell joined the New York Knicks for the 2012 NBA Summer League. On October 1, 2012, he signed with the Oklahoma City Thunder. However, he was later waived by the Thunder on October 22, 2012. In November 2012, he was once again reacquired by the Mad Ants. On December 27, 2012, he was traded to the Reno Bighorns. On April 19, 2013, he signed with Cocodrilos de Caracas of Venezuela.

=== 2013–14 season ===
In July 2013, Russell re-joined Leones de Santo Domingo of the Liga Nacional de Baloncesto.

On September 1, 2013, he signed a one-month contract with Galatasaray of the Turkish Basketball League. He left the club following his contract's expiration before playing in a game for them. On February 27, 2014, he was reacquired by the Reno Bighorns.

In May 2014, he signed with Leones de Santo Domingo for the 2014 season, returning to the club for a third stint.

=== 2014–15 season ===
On October 2, 2014, Russell signed with Apollon Limassol of the Cyprus Basketball Division 1. After appearing in just one game on November 2, he left Apollon and returned to the United States. On December 23, he was acquired by the Westchester Knicks. In May, 2015, he returned with Leones de Santo Domingo.

== Coaching career ==
On October 11, 2025, Russell joined the Motor City Cruise of the NBA G League as an assistant coach.

== Personal life ==
Russell is the son of former NBA player, Walker Russell Sr., who played six seasons in the NBA during the 1980s. Both father and son started their NBA career with the Pistons. Russell Jr.'s first son, Aiden Jake, was born on February 25, 2012.

== Career statistics ==
Legend
GP	Games played	GS	Games started	MPG	Minutes per game
FG%	Field goal percentage	3P%	3-point field goal percentage	FT%	Free throw percentage
RPG	Rebounds per game	APG	Assists per game	SPG	Steals per game
BPG	Blocks per game	PPG	Points per game	**Bold**	Career high

=== NBA ===
Year	Team	GP	GS	MPG	FG%	3P%	FT%	RPG	APG	SPG	BPG	PPG
2011–12	Detroit	28	0	12.8	.347	.308	.636	.9	2.1	.6	.0	3.0
Career		28	0	12.8	.347	.308	.636	.9	2.1	.6	.0	3.0
