= Chris Wilcox =

American basketball player (born 1982)

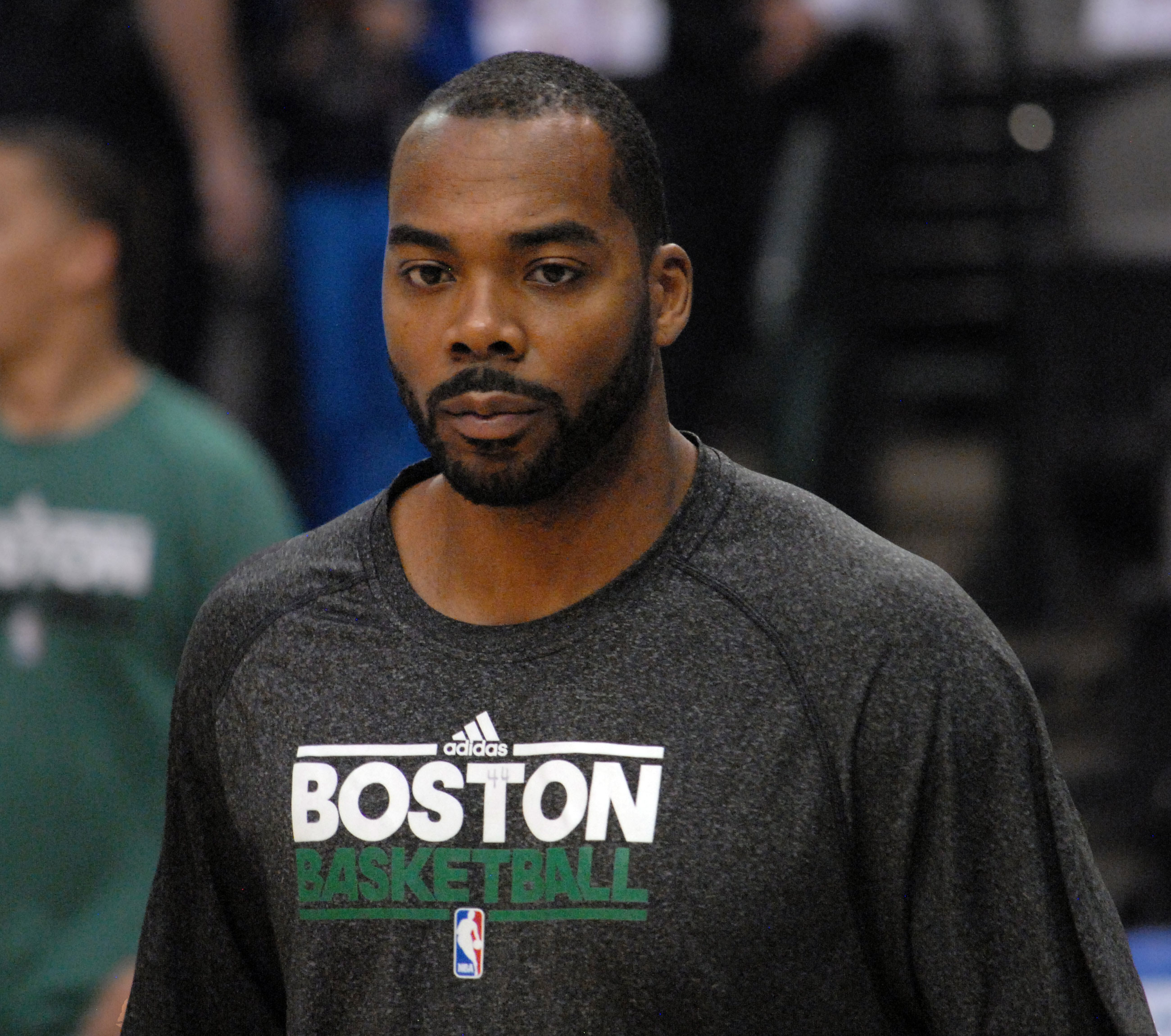
- Wilcox with the Boston Celtics in 2012

Personal information
- Born: September 3, 1982 (age 44) Raleigh, North Carolina, U.S.
- Listed height: 6 ft 10 in (2.08 m)
- Listed weight: 235 lb (107 kg)

Career information
- High school: Whiteville (Whiteville, North Carolina); William G. Enloe (Raleigh, North Carolina)
- College: Maryland (2000–2002)
- NBA draft: 2002: 1st round, 8th overall pick
- Drafted by: Los Angeles Clippers
- Playing career: 2002–2013
- Position: Power forward / center
- Number: 54, 9, 44

Career history
- 2002–2006: Los Angeles Clippers
- 2006–2009: Seattle SuperSonics / Oklahoma City Thunder
- 2009: New York Knicks
- 2009–2011: Detroit Pistons
- 2011–2013: Boston Celtics

Career highlights
- NCAA champion (2002); Third-team All-ACC (2002)
- Stats at NBA.com
- Stats at Basketball Reference

Chris Ray Wilcox (born September 3, 1982) is an American former professional basketball player. He played in the National Basketball Association (NBA) for the Los Angeles Clippers, Seattle SuperSonics / Oklahoma City Thunder, New York Knicks, and Detroit Pistons from 2002 to 2013.

== High School and College career ==
While at Whiteville High School in Whiteville, North Carolina, he led the basketball team to the 2A State Championship in 1999, before transferring to William G. Enloe High School in Raleigh, NC for his senior year. He then attended the University of Maryland, where he helped the Terrapins win their first NCAA championship in 2002.

== Professional career ==
=== Los Angeles Clippers (2002–2006) ===
Wilcox was drafted by the Los Angeles Clippers in 2002.

=== Seattle SuperSonics / Oklahoma City Thunder (2006–2009) ===
Wilcox was traded on February 14, 2006, to the Seattle SuperSonics in exchange for Vladimir Radmanović.

While playing for the Sonics in 2005–2006, Wilcox averaged 14.1 points per game and 8.2 rebounds per game. He was on the starting lineup for 23 of his 29 games with the Sonics that season.

On April 4, 2006, Wilcox recorded a career-high 24 rebounds in a win over the Houston Rockets. Wilcox's rebound total was the most by a Sonic player since Jack Sikma grabbed 25 at Utah on February 10, 1983.

=== New York Knicks (2009) ===
On February 19, 2009, Wilcox was traded to the New York Knicks for Malik Rose.

=== Detroit Pistons (2009–2011) ===
On July 22, 2009, Wilcox signed a multi-year contract with the Detroit Pistons.

=== Boston Celtics (2011–2013) ===
On December 9, 2011, Wilcox agreed to a contract with the Boston Celtics for the midlevel exception ($3 million). After being diagnosed with a heart irregularity, he was waived by the Celtics on March 23, 2012. However, Wilcox was later cleared to play, and he re-signed with the Celtics on July 14, 2012.

Wilcox's final NBA game was Game 4 of the 2013 Eastern Conference First Round against the New York Knicks on April 28, 2013. Boston would win Game 4 97–90, but go on to lose the series in 6 games. In his final game, Wilcox only played for 43 seconds (substituting at the end of the 3rd quarter for Kevin Garnett) and recorded no stats.

== NBA career statistics ==
Legend
GP	Games played	GS	Games started	MPG	Minutes per game
FG%	Field goal percentage	3P%	3-point field goal percentage	FT%	Free throw percentage
RPG	Rebounds per game	APG	Assists per game	SPG	Steals per game
BPG	Blocks per game	PPG	Points per game	**Bold**	Career high
*	Led the league

=== Regular season ===
Year	Team	GP	GS	MPG	FG%	3P%	FT%	RPG	APG	SPG	BPG	PPG
2002–03	L.A. Clippers	46	3	10.4	.521	.000	.500	2.3	.5	.2	.3	3.7
2003–04	L.A. Clippers	65	17	20.6	.521	.000	.700	4.7	.8	.4	.3	8.6
2004–05	L.A. Clippers	54	25	18.6	.514	.000	.611	4.2	.7	.5	.4	7.9
2005–06	L.A. Clippers	48	1	13.7	.536	.000	.644	3.6	.4	.3	.4	4.5
2005–06	Seattle	29	23	30.1	.592	.000	**.787**	**8.2**	**1.2**	.6	.4	**14.1**
2006–07	Seattle	**82***	**81**	**31.5**	.529	.000	.684	7.7	1.0	**.9**	.5	13.5
2007–08	Seattle	62	55	28.0	.524	.000	.645	7.0	**1.2**	.7	**.6**	13.4
2008–09	Oklahoma City	37	6	19.4	.485	.000	.598	5.3	.9	.5	.3	8.4
2008–09	New York	25	0	13.2	.529	.000	.509	3.3	.6	.3	.2	5.4
2009–10	Detroit	34	10	13.0	.525	.000	.500	3.4	.4	.4	.4	4.5
2010–11	Detroit	57	29	17.5	.581	.000	.562	4.8	.8	.5	.3	7.4
2011–12	Boston	28	4	17.2	.598	.000	.615	4.4	.4	.4	.3	5.4
2012–13	Boston	61	7	13.6	**.719**	.000	.672	3.0	.4	.5	.5	4.2
Career		628	261	19.9	.541	.000	.643	4.9	.7	.5	.4	8.2

=== Playoffs ===
Year	Team	GP	GS	MPG	FG%	3P%	FT%	RPG	APG	SPG	BPG	PPG
2013	Boston	2	0	3.0	.000	.000	.000	1.0	.0	.0	.0	.0
Career		2	0	3.0	.000	.000	.000	1.0	.0	.0	.0	.0

== See also ==
- List of NBA career field goal percentage leaders
