= Jason Maxiell =

American basketball player (born 1983)

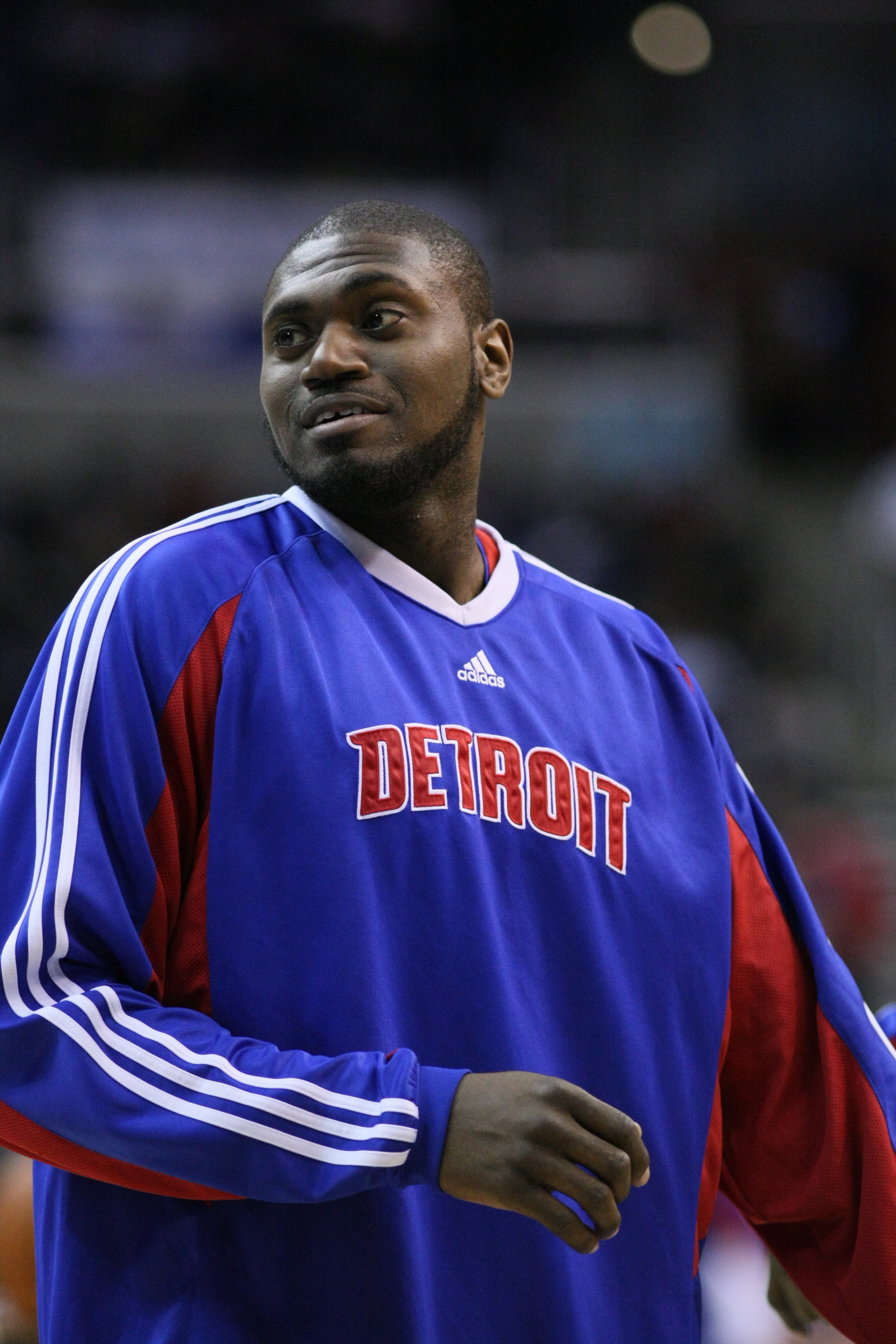
- Maxiell with the Detroit Pistons in 2008

Sacramento Kings
- Title: Assistant coach
- League: NBA

Personal information
- Born: February 18, 1983 (age 43) Chicago, Illinois, U.S.
- Listed height: 6 ft 7 in (2.01 m)
- Listed weight: 260 lb (118 kg)

Career information
- High school: Newman Smith (Carrollton, Texas)
- College: Cincinnati (2001–2005)
- NBA draft: 2005: 1st round, 26th overall pick
- Drafted by: Detroit Pistons
- Playing career: 2005–2017
- Position: Power forward / center
- Number: 54

Career history

Playing
- 2005–2013: Detroit Pistons
- 2013–2014: Orlando Magic
- 2014–2015: Charlotte Hornets
- 2015–2016: Tianjin Ronggang
- 2016–2017: Acıbadem Üniversitesi

Coaching
- 2025–2026: Stockton Kings (assistant)
- 2026–present: Sacramento Kings

Career highlights
- 2× Second-team All-Conference USA (2004, 2005); Conference USA Sixth Man of the Year (2002); Conference USA All-Freshmen Team (2002)
- Stats at NBA.com
- Stats at Basketball Reference

Jason Dior Maxiell (born February 18, 1983) is an American former professional basketball player best known for his tenure with the Detroit Pistons from 2005 to 2013. He currently serves as a player development assistant for the Sacramento Kings of the National Basketball Association (NBA). He played college basketball for the University of Cincinnati and professionally in the NBA, China, and Turkey before retiring on August 4, 2017.

== College career ==
After graduating from Newman Smith High School in 2001, Maxiell played college basketball for the University of Cincinnati from 2001 to 2005 where he was coached by Bob Huggins. After earning Conference USA Sixth Man and All-Freshmen team honors as a freshman, Maxiell earned All-Conference USA second team honors in both his junior and senior years. As a senior in 2004–05, he led Conference USA in blocked shots (2.8 bpg) and ranked 18th in the nation. His 91 blocks are the second-highest University of Cincinnati single-season total.

Maxiell finished 13th on Cincinnati's career scoring list with 1,566 points (13th in Conference USA history) and second on the UC career chart for blocked shots with 252 (4th in C-USA). He also played 129 consecutive games, the second-longest streak in Bearcats’ history, and started the last 77 contests.

== Professional career ==
=== NBA career ===
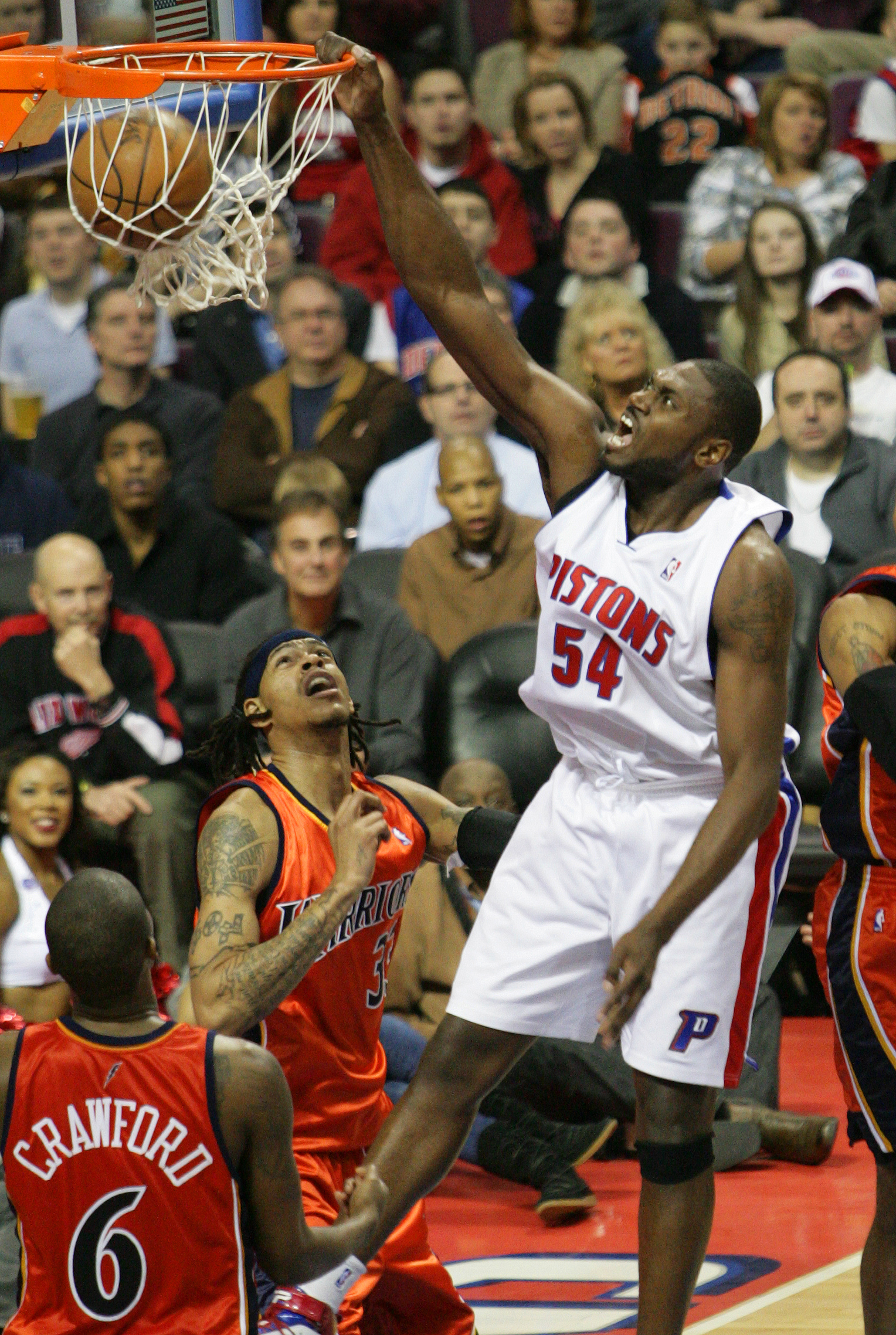
Maxiell slam dunking against the Golden State Warriors

Maxiell was selected by the Detroit Pistons with the 26th overall pick in the 2005 NBA draft. On July 5, 2005, he signed his rookie scale contract with the Pistons. On October 31, 2008, he signed a four-year contract extension with the Pistons worth $20 million, keeping him under contract with the franchise until the end of the 2012–13 season. On June 29, 2012, he exercised his $5 million player option, returning to the Pistons for the 2012–13 season.

On July 18, 2013, Maxiell signed with the Orlando Magic to a reported two-year, $5 million contract. On July 4, 2014, he was waived by the Magic.

On September 28, 2014, Maxiell signed with the Charlotte Hornets.

=== Overseas career ===
On August 10, 2015, Maxiell signed with Tianjin Ronggang of the Chinese Basketball Association.

In June 2016, Maxiell was signed by Tropang TNT of the Philippine Basketball Association to be the team's import for the 2016 PBA Governors' Cup. However, on June 17, 2016, Maxiell was declared ineligible for the 2016 Governors' Cup after failing to make the height limit of 6 feet 5 inches. Maxiell was officially measured at 6'5 11/16" (6 feet 5.6875 inches).

On January 30, 2017, Maxiell signed with the second-tier Turkish team Acıbadem Üniversitesi.

=== Retirement ===
On August 4, 2017, Maxiell signed a contract with the Detroit Pistons, which allowed him to retire as a member of the Pistons.

== Coaching career ==
On October 23, 2025, Maxiell was hired to serve as an assistant coach for the Stockton Kings of the NBA G League.

On September 14, 2026, the Sacramento Kings hired Maxiell to serve as a player development assistant under head coach Doug Christie.

== Career statistics ==
Legend
GP	Games played	GS	Games started	MPG	Minutes per game
FG%	Field goal percentage	3P%	3-point field goal percentage	FT%	Free throw percentage
RPG	Rebounds per game	APG	Assists per game	SPG	Steals per game
BPG	Blocks per game	PPG	Points per game	**Bold**	Career high
*	Led the league

=== College ===
Year	Team	GP	GS	MPG	FG%	3P%	FT%	RPG	APG	SPG	BPG	PPG
2001–02	Cincinnati	**35**	3	20.9	**.552**	–	.585	6.8	.1	.7	1.5	8.1
2002–03	Cincinnati	29	27	30.3	.445	.000	.672	6.7	.4	.4	1.5	11.9
2003–04	Cincinnati	32	32	28.6	.500	.000	**.681**	6.9	**1.3**	.7	2.1	13.6
2004–2005	Cincinnati	33	**33**	**31.4**	.543	**.400**	.645	**7.7**	.8	**1.0**	**2.7**	**15.3**
Career		129	95	27.6	.507	.286	.653	7.0	.7	.7	1.9	12.1

=== NBA ===
==== Regular season ====
Year	Team	GP	GS	MPG	FG%	3P%	FT%	RPG	APG	SPG	BPG	PPG
2005–06	Detroit	26	0	6.1	.426	.000	.333	1.1	.1	.2	.2	2.3
2006–07	Detroit	67	8	14.1	.500	.000	.526	2.8	.2	.4	.9	5.0
2007–08	Detroit	**82***	7	21.6	.538	.000	**.633**	5.3	.6	.3	1.1	**7.9**
2008–09	Detroit	78	4	18.1	**.575**	.000	.532	4.2	.3	.3	.8	5.8
2009–10	Detroit	76	29	20.4	.511	.000	.574	5.3	.5	**.5**	.5	6.8
2010–11	Detroit	57	14	16.3	.492	.000	.515	3.0	.3	.4	.4	4.2
2011–12	Detroit	65	42	22.6	.478	.000	.547	5.1	.6	**.5**	.8	6.5
2012–13	Detroit	72	**71**	**24.8**	.446	.000	.621	**5.7**	**.8**	.4	**1.3**	6.9
2013–14	Orlando	34	13	14.4	.448	.000	.484	2.5	.3	.2	.6	3.2
2014–15	Charlotte	61	0	14.4	.422	.000	.577	3.3	.3	.3	.7	3.3
Career		618	188	18.4	.495	.000	.564	4.2	.4	.4	.8	5.6

==== Playoffs ====
Year	Team	GP	GS	MPG	FG%	3P%	FT%	RPG	APG	SPG	BPG	PPG
2007	Detroit	14	0	10.4	**.667**	.000	.522	2.4	.1	.3	.6	4.0
2008	Detroit	**17**	**6**	**21.8**	.625	.000	.469	**4.0**	**.9**	**.9**	**1.3**	**5.6**
2009	Detroit	4	0	16.0	.500	.000	**.556**	3.3	.5	.3	.3	3.8
Career		35	6	16.6	.626	.000	.500	3.3	.6	.6	.9	4.7
