= Brandon Knight (basketball) =

American basketball player (born 1991)

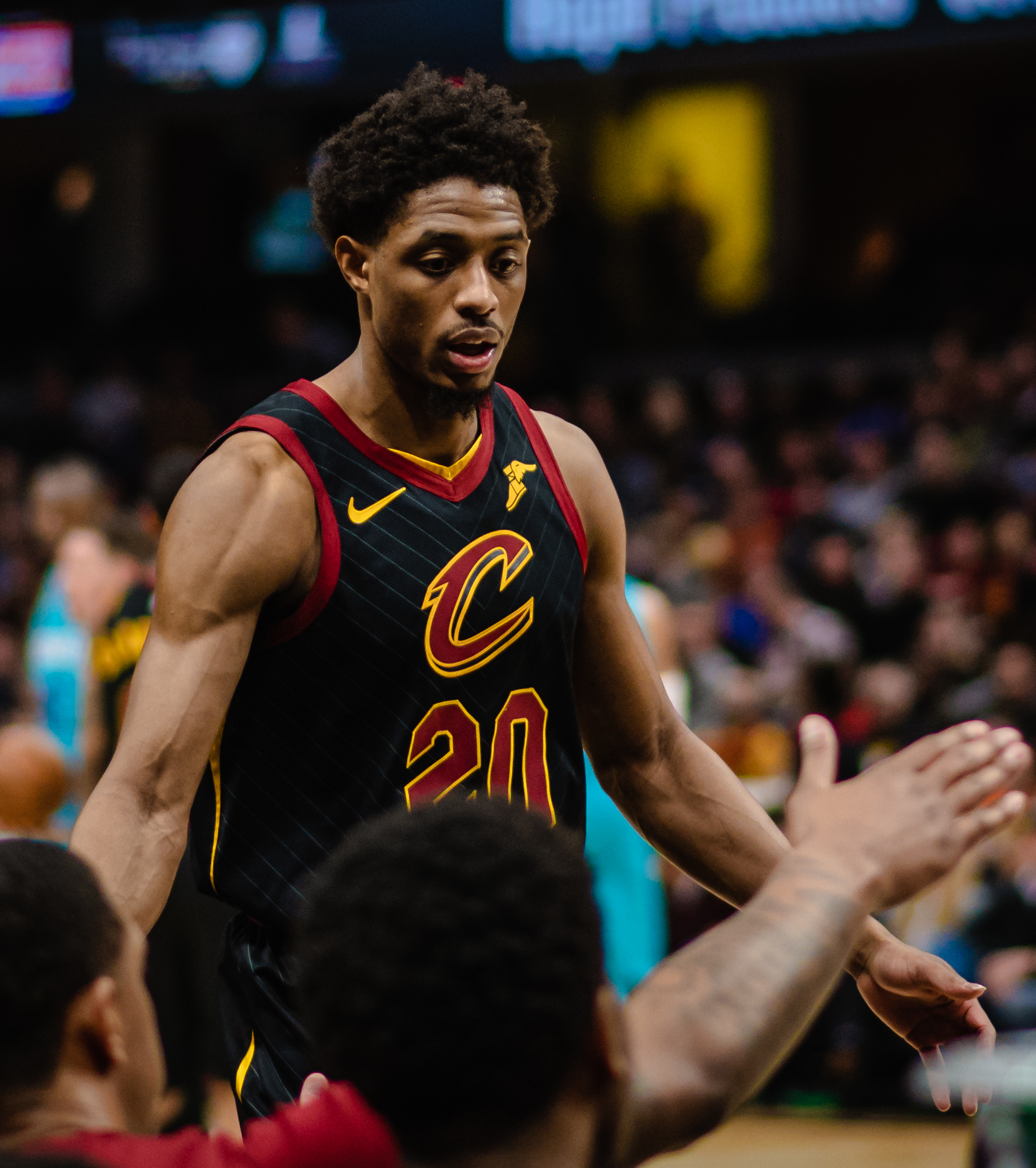
- Knight with the Cleveland Cavaliers in 2019

No. 17 – Perth Wildcats
- Position: Point guard / shooting guard
- League: NBL

Personal information
- Born: December 3, 1991 (age 34) Miami, Florida, U.S.
- Listed height: 6 ft 2 in (1.88 m)
- Listed weight: 182 lb (83 kg)

Career information
- High school: Pine Crest (Fort Lauderdale, Florida)
- College: Kentucky (2010–2011)
- NBA draft: 2011: 1st round, 8th overall pick
- Drafted by: Detroit Pistons
- Playing career: 2011–present

Career history
- 2011–2013: Detroit Pistons
- 2013–2015: Milwaukee Bucks
- 2015–2018: Phoenix Suns
- 2018–2019: Houston Rockets
- 2018: → Rio Grande Valley Vipers
- 2019–2020: Cleveland Cavaliers
- 2020: Detroit Pistons
- 2021–2022: Sioux Falls Skyforce
- 2021–2022: Dallas Mavericks
- 2023: Piratas de Quebradillas
- 2024: AEK Athens
- 2025: Capitanes de Arecibo
- 2026: Mets de Guaynabo
- 2026–present: Perth Wildcats

Career highlights
- NBA All-Rookie First Team (2012); BSN Most Valuable Player (2023); BSN scoring champion (2023); First-team All-SEC (2011); SEC All-Freshman Team (2011); Gatorade High School Athlete of the Year (2010); 2× Gatorade National Player of the Year (2009, 2010); First-team Parade All-American (2010); Second-team Parade All-American (2009); McDonald's All-American (2010); 2× Florida Mr. Basketball (2009, 2010)
- Stats at NBA.com
- Stats at Basketball Reference

Brandon Emmanuel Knight (born December 2, 1991) is an American professional basketball player for the Perth Wildcats of the Australian National Basketball League (NBL). A two-time Gatorade National Player of the Year, Knight played one season of college basketball for Kentucky before being selected by the Detroit Pistons in the 2011 NBA draft. After two seasons with the Pistons, he was traded to the Milwaukee Bucks. He spent a season and a half in Milwaukee before being traded to the Phoenix Suns in 2015. He also had stints with the Houston Rockets, Cleveland Cavaliers, and Dallas Mavericks.

== High school career ==
Born in Miami, Florida, Knight attended Pine Crest School in Fort Lauderdale, Florida. A student-athlete at Pine Crest, Knight held a 4.3 grade-point average. As a junior in 2008–09, he averaged 31.2 points, 8.2 rebounds, 5.6 assists and 3.2 steals. As a senior in 2009–10, he averaged 32.5 points, 8.6 rebounds and 4 assists. He was subsequently named Gatorade National Player of the Year both years, in addition to earning Gatorade High School Athlete of the Year in 2010. He led Pine Crest to four state title games, winning state championships in 2008 and 2009. He was also a four-time class 3A-1A Basketball Player of the Year (as named by the Miami Herald) and a two-time Florida Mr. Basketball. His 3,515 career points ranks second on the Florida high school basketball scoring list.

Following his senior season, Knight participated in the McDonald's All-American Game, Nike Hoop Summit and Jordan Brand Classic. In the 2010 McDonald's All-American Game, he hit a 3-pointer at the buzzer to give the West a 107–104 win.

Ranked as the No. 6 overall prospect of 2010 by Rivals.com, Knight made a verbal commitment to the University of Kentucky in April 2010. Knight did not sign a binding national letter of intent with Kentucky. He kept his options open by signing a financial-aid agreement, which indicated his intention to play for Kentucky, but left him free to go elsewhere amid speculation about coach John Calipari going to the NBA.

== College career ==
Knight averaged 17.3 points, 4.0 rebounds and 4.2 assists in 38 games as a freshman for the Kentucky Wildcats. He shot 42% from the field, 38% from three-point range and 80% from the free-throw line on the season. He set Kentucky freshman records in points scored (657), 3-pointers made (87) and most 20-point games in a season (14). He also led the team in SEC play with 17.2 points, 4.6 rebounds and 4.1 assists in 16 games to earn First-Team All-SEC honors by the coaches, Second-Team All-SEC by the media and an SEC All-Freshman team selection. Knight scored a career-high 30 points against West Virginia in the third round of the 2011 NCAA tournament. He then recorded 22 points, seven rebounds and four assists against North Carolina in the Elite Eight and was named the NCAA East Region All-Tournament Most Outstanding Player.

In April 2011, Knight declared for the NBA draft, forgoing his final three years of college eligibility.

== Professional career ==
=== Detroit Pistons (2011–2013) ===
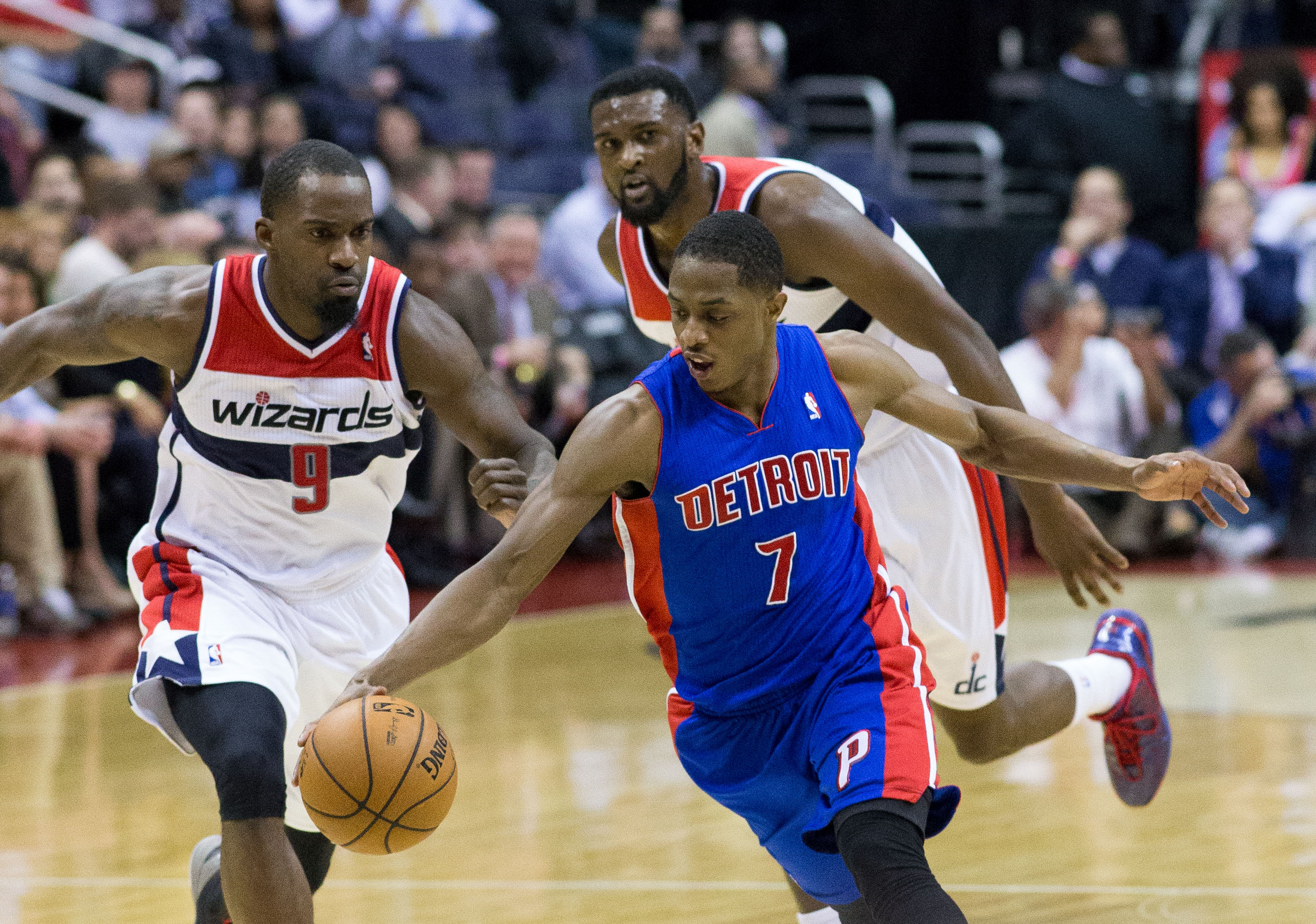
Knight with the Pistons in February 2013

Knight was selected by the Detroit Pistons with the eighth overall pick in the 2011 NBA draft. In May 2012, he earned NBA All-Rookie First Team honors, becoming the first Pistons' rookie since Grant Hill (1994–95) to be named to the NBA All-Rookie First Team. Knight's 847 points were the second-most by a Pistons' rookie since the 1985–86 season and his 12.8 points per game were the fourth-highest average by a Pistons' rookie since the 1980–81 season. In a game against the Los Angeles Clippers on March 10, 2013, DeAndre Jordan performed a poster dunk on Brandon Knight that went internet viral the next day.

Knight appeared in 141 games (135 starts) in two seasons with Detroit, averaging 13.1 points, 3.2 rebounds, and 3.9 assists while shooting 37.3 percent from beyond the arc. He scored in double figures 92 times with the Pistons, including three 30-point outings.

=== Milwaukee Bucks (2013–2015) ===
On July 31, 2013, Knight was traded, along with Khris Middleton and Viacheslav Kravtsov, to the Milwaukee Bucks in exchange for Brandon Jennings. Knight's first season with Milwaukee was hit early with a hamstring injury in the season opener on October 30, limiting him to two minutes that night and forcing him to miss eight of the next 10 games. On December 20, 2013, Knight scored 17 points, grabbed 14 rebounds, and recorded 8 assists in a 114–111 loss to the Cleveland Cavaliers. On December 31, Knight scored a career-high 37 points in a 94–79 win over the Los Angeles Lakers. He enjoyed the most productive season in his three years as a pro, becoming only the second player in the franchise's 46-year history to lead the team in scoring (1,291 points) and assists (352) during his first season with the team.

On November 19, 2014, Knight missed a wide-open fastbreak layup for the win in OT against the Brooklyn Nets. However, he was able to redeem himself by hitting a game-tying triple to force a third OT. The Bucks were able to win the game 122–118. On January 15, 2015, Knight scored 20 points, grabbed 5 rebounds, recorded 6 assists, and recorded a career-high 6 steals in a blowout win versus the New York Knicks. The 2014–15 season saw Knight enter the All-Star break as the team's leader in scoring and assists. In 52 games at the All-Star break, he averaged 17.8 points, a career-high 5.4 assists, a career-high 4.3 rebounds, and a career-high 1.6 steals, while shooting career-highs of 43.5 percent from the field and 40.9 percent from three-point range.

=== Phoenix Suns (2015–2018) ===
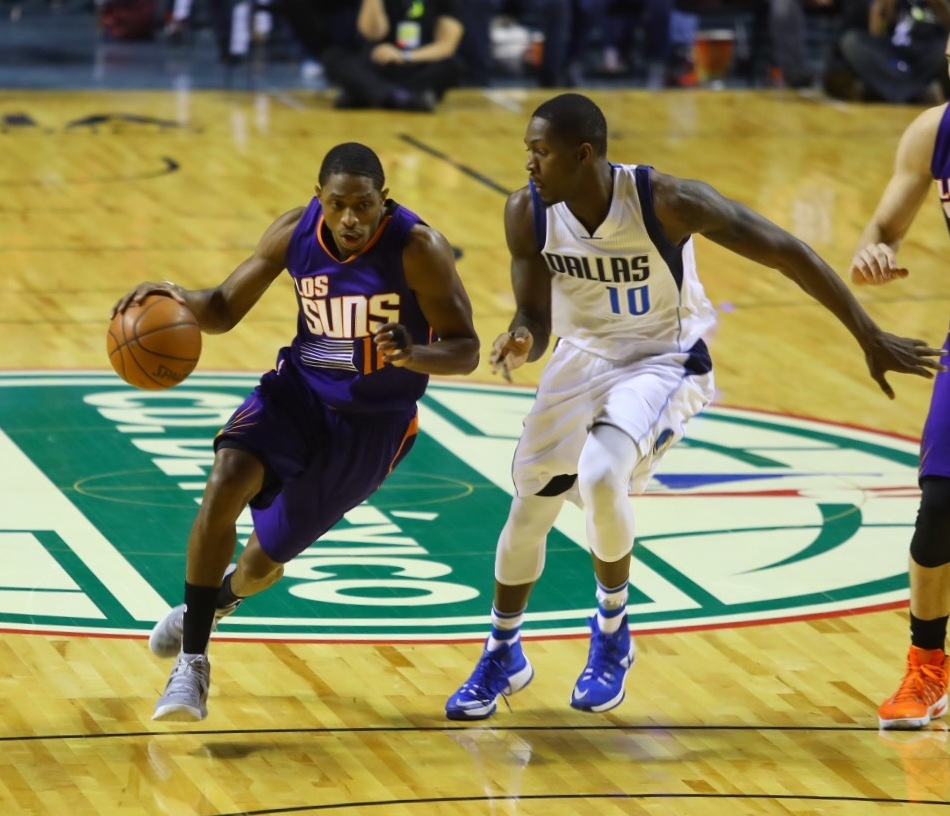
Knight guarded by Dorian Finney-Smith while with the Suns in January 2017

On February 19, 2015, Knight was traded, along with Kendall Marshall, to the Phoenix Suns in a three-team trade also involving the Philadelphia 76ers. He missed time in March with a left ankle injury, before missing the conclusion of the season with a left heel bone bruise that required surgery.

On July 17, 2015, Knight re-signed with the Suns to a five-year, $70 million contract. On November 12, he tied his career high with 37 points in a 118–104 win over the Los Angeles Clippers. Four days later, Knight recorded his first career triple-double posting 30 points, 10 rebounds and a career-high 15 assists in a 120–101 win over the Los Angeles Lakers. Knight became just the fourth player since steals became an official stat in the 1973–74 season to record a triple-double with a line of at least 30 points, 15 assists, 10 rebounds and four steals, joining Pete Maravich, Magic Johnson and Russell Westbrook, as well as the second player behind Magic Johnson to record such a line at 23 years old or younger. On November 20, Knight set a new career high with 38 points in a 114–107 victory over the Denver Nuggets. On December 13, he scored 25 points and hit a career-high seven 3-pointers in a 108–101 win over the Minnesota Timberwolves. Knight missed time between late January and early March with a left adductor strain. On March 12, he scored 30 points and hit a career high-tying seven 3-pointers in a 123–116 loss to the Golden State Warriors. On March 28, he again scored 30 points and tied a career high with seven 3-pointers in a 121–116 loss to the Minnesota Timberwolves, recording his fifth 30-point game of the season. On April 3, he was ruled out for the rest of the season with the same left adductor strain that kept him out for seven weeks earlier in the season. Five days later, he underwent successful surgery to treat the sports hernia.

The 2016–17 season saw Knight come off the bench during the first half of the season before being shut down despite being healthy over the second half of the season. He went on to miss the entire 2017–18 season after sustaining a torn ACL in his left knee in July 2017 that required surgery.

=== Houston Rockets (2018–2019) ===
On August 31, 2018, Knight was traded, alongside Marquese Chriss, to the Houston Rockets in exchange for Ryan Anderson and De'Anthony Melton. Despite looking to rehabilitate his career in 2018–19, Knight was ruled out indefinitely prior to the season after his surgery got infected during the offseason. On November 30, he was assigned to the Rio Grande Valley Vipers of the NBA G League on a rehab assignment. He played for the Vipers that night, recording 16 points and five assists in 22 minutes against the Salt Lake City Stars, before being recalled by the Rockets on December 1. On December 13, he made his debut for the Rockets, recording one assist and one rebound in four minutes in a 126–111 win over the Los Angeles Lakers, marking his first game since February 15, 2017. He played 12 games for the Rockets, with his final appearance coming on January 11 against the Cleveland Cavaliers. He was sidelined in January due to left knee soreness.

=== Cleveland Cavaliers (2019–2020) ===
On February 7, 2019, Knight was acquired by the Cleveland Cavaliers in a three-team trade involving the Rockets and the Sacramento Kings. He made his debut for the Cavaliers two days later, scoring nine points in just under 12 minutes off the bench in a 105–90 loss to the Indiana Pacers.

=== Return to Detroit (2020) ===
On February 6, 2020, the Cleveland Cavaliers traded Knight and John Henson, along with a 2023 second-round draft pick, to the Detroit Pistons for Andre Drummond.

=== Dallas Mavericks / Sioux Falls Skyforce (2021–2022) ===
After not playing during the 2020–21 season, Knight joined the Brooklyn Nets for the 2021 NBA Summer League. On October 16, he signed with the New York Knicks, but was waived the same day.

On October 23, 2021, Knight was selected sixth overall by the Sioux Falls Skyforce in the 2021 NBA G League draft. After averaging 21.3 points, 5.5 assists, and 4.6 rebounds in 11 games to start the 2021–22 NBA G League season, Knight signed a 10-day contract with the Dallas Mavericks on December 23, 2021. On January 14, 2022, he was reacquired by Sioux Falls after the 10-day deal expired. On March 29, he signed a second 10-day contract with the Mavericks.

=== Piratas de Quebradillas (2023) ===
On March 14, 2023, Knight signed with Piratas de Quebradillas of the Baloncesto Superior Nacional. For the 2023 BSN season, he was named league MVP and earned the scoring title with averages of 24.4 points, 5.2 assists, and 3.2 threes per game.

=== AEK Athens (2024) ===
In January 2024, Knight joined AEK Athens of the Greek Basketball League. In 11 league games to finish the 2023–24 season, he averaged 9.2 points, 1.9 rebounds and 3.1 assists per game. He also appeared in six BCL games, averaging 8.0 points, 1.7 rebounds and 3.2 assists per game.

=== Capitanes de Arecibo (2025) ===
In February 2025, Knight joined Capitanes de Arecibo for the 2025 Baloncesto Superior Nacional season. In 22 games, he averaged 19.0 points, 4.3 rebounds, 5.5 assists and 1.2 steals per game.

=== Mets de Guaynabo (2026) ===
Knight joined Mets de Guaynabo for the 2026 Baloncesto Superior Nacional season. In 19 games, he averaged 18.0 points, 3.8 rebounds, 6.4 assists and 1.1 steals per game.

=== Perth Wildcats (2026–present) ===
On September 14, 2026, Knight signed with the Perth Wildcats of the Australian National Basketball League (NBL) for the 2026–27 season. On October 23, he scored 20 points and made the game-winning midrange jumper with eight seconds remaining to lift the Wildcats to a 103–102 win over Melbourne United.

== Career statistics ==
Legend
GP	Games played	GS	Games started	MPG	Minutes per game
FG%	Field goal percentage	3P%	3-point field goal percentage	FT%	Free throw percentage
RPG	Rebounds per game	APG	Assists per game	SPG	Steals per game
BPG	Blocks per game	PPG	Points per game	**Bold**	Career high
*	Led the league

=== NBA ===
==== Regular season ====
Year	Team	GP	GS	MPG	FG%	3P%	FT%	RPG	APG	SPG	BPG	PPG
2011–12	Detroit	66*	60	32.3	.415	.380	.759	3.2	3.8	.7	.2	12.8
2012–13	Detroit	**75**	**75**	31.5	.407	.367	.733	3.3	4.0	.8	.1	13.3
2013–14	Milwaukee	72	69	33.3	.422	.325	.802	3.5	4.9	1.0	.2	17.9
2014–15	Milwaukee	52	52	32.5	**.435**	**.409**	.881	**4.3**	**5.4**	**1.6**	.2	17.8
2014–15	Phoenix	11	9	31.5	.357	.313	.828	2.1	4.5	.5	.1	13.4
2015–16	Phoenix	52	50	**36.0**	.415	.342	.852	3.9	5.1	1.2	**.4**	**19.6**
2016–17	Phoenix	54	5	21.1	.398	.324	.857	2.2	2.4	.5	.1	11.0
2018–19	Houston	12	0	9.8	.234	.156	.818	.8	.8	.2	.0	3.0
2018–19	Cleveland	27	26	22.9	.413	.371	.783	1.9	2.3	.7	.1	8.5
2019–20	Cleveland	16	0	15.1	.326	.297	.308	1.3	1.9	.3	.1	4.9
2019–20	Detroit	9	3	24.6	.383	.238	.762	2.3	4.2	.6	.1	11.6
2021–22	Dallas	5	0	13.0	.400	.235	**1.000**	1.6	1.6	.2	.0	6.4
Career		451	349	29.3	.411	.352	.807	3.1	3.9	.9	.2	14.0

=== College ===
Year	Team	GP	GS	MPG	FG%	3P%	FT%	RPG	APG	SPG	BPG	PPG
2010–11	Kentucky	38	38	35.9	.423	.377	.795	4.0	4.2	.7	.2	17.3

== Personal life ==
Knight is the son of Efrem and Tonya Knight.

Knight is a Christian.
