= 2013–14 Milwaukee Bucks season =

NBA professional basketball team season

- Head coach: Larry Drew
- General manager: John Hammond
- Owners: Herb Kohl
- Arena: Bradley Center

Results
- Record: 15–67 (.183)
- Place: Division: 5th (Central); Conference: 15th (Eastern)
- Playoff finish: Did not qualify
- Stats at Basketball Reference

The 2013–14 Milwaukee Bucks season was the Bucks' 46th season in the NBA. They finished with 15 wins and 67 losses, the worst record in the NBA. It was the Bucks' worst season record in franchise history, five fewer wins than their previous low-mark in 1993–94.

== Key dates ==
- June 27: The 2013 NBA draft took place at the Barclays Center in Brooklyn, New York.
- July 1: 2013 NBA Free Agency begins.

== Draft picks ==
Round	Pick	Player	Position	Nationality	College/Club
1	15	Giannis Antetokounmpo	G/F	Greece	Filathlitikos B.C.
2	38	Nate Wolters	G	United States	South Dakota State (Sr.)

== Roster ==
2013-14 Milwaukee Bucks roster
Players

Pos.	No.	Player	Height	Weight	DOB	From
F	12	Jeff Adrien	6 ft 7 in (2.01 m)	245 lb (111 kg)	1986–02–10	Connecticut
G/F	34	Giannis Antetokounmpo	6 ft 9 in (2.06 m)	205 lb (93 kg)	1994–12–06	Greece
G/F	10	Carlos Delfino (injured)	6 ft 6 in (1.98 m)	230 lb (104 kg)	1982–08–29	Argentina
F/C	31	John Henson	6 ft 11 in (2.11 m)	220 lb (100 kg)	1990–12–28	North Carolina
F	7	Ersan İlyasova	6 ft 10 in (2.08 m)	235 lb (107 kg)	1987–05–15	Turkey
G	11	Brandon Knight	6 ft 3 in (1.91 m)	189 lb (86 kg)	1991–12–02	Kentucky
G	00	O. J. Mayo	6 ft 4 in (1.93 m)	210 lb (95 kg)	1987–11–05	USC
F	22	Khris Middleton	6 ft 8 in (2.03 m)	217 lb (98 kg)	1991–12–08	Texas A&M
F/C	27	Zaza Pachulia	6 ft 11 in (2.11 m)	275 lb (125 kg)	1984–10–02	Georgia
C	9	Miroslav Raduljica	7 ft 0 in (2.13 m)	250 lb (113 kg)	1988–01–05	Serbia
F/C	8	Larry Sanders (injured)	6 ft 11 in (2.11 m)	235 lb (107 kg)	1988–11–21	VCU
G	13	Ramon Sessions	6 ft 3 in (1.91 m)	190 lb (86 kg)	1986–04–11	Nevada
F/C	5	Ekpe Udoh	6 ft 10 in (2.08 m)	245 lb (111 kg)	1987–05–20	Baylor
G	6	Nate Wolters	6 ft 4 in (1.93 m)	190 lb (86 kg)	1991–05–15	South Dakota State

Coaches
Head coach
- Larry Drew
Assistant(s)
- Jim Cleamons
- Bob Bender
- Nick Van Exel
- Scott Williams
- Josh Oppenheimer

Legend
- (DP) Unsigned draft pick
- (FA) Free agent
- (S) Suspended
- (DL) On assignment to D-League affiliate
- Injured

Roster
Updated: 2014–04–15

=== Overview ===
Players Added

Via draft

- Giannis Antetokounmpo

Via trade

- Brandon Knight
- Khris Middleton
- Luke Ridnour
- Caron Butler
- Nate Wolters
- Ramon Sessions
- Jeff Adrien

Via free agency

- O. J. Mayo
- Carlos Delfino
- Gary Neal
- Zaza Pachulia
- Miroslav Raduljica
Players Lost

Via trade

- Brandon Jennings
- JJ Redick
- Luc Mbah a Moute
- Ish Smith
- Luke Ridnour
- Gary Neal

Via free agency

- Monta Ellis
- Gustavo Ayon
- Samuel Dalembert
- Marquis Daniels
- Mike Dunleavy Jr.
- Drew Gooden
- Joel Przybilla

== Pre-season ==
2013 pre-season game log
Total: 2–5 (Home: 2–1; Road: 0–4)
Pre-season: 2–5 (home: 2–1; road: 0–4)

Game	Date	Team	Score	High points	High rebounds	High assists	Location Attendance	Record
1	October 8	@ Cleveland	L 87–99	Stephen Graham (15)	Sanders & Ridnour (5)	Nate Wolters (3)	Quicken Loans Arena; 9,022	0–1
2	October 10	@ Minnesota	L 89–98	John Henson (16)	Giannis Antetokounmpo (7)	Mayo & Ridnour (4)	The Pentagon; 3,250	0–2
3	October 12	Charlotte	L 76–83	Caron Butler (18)	John Henson (10)	Brandon Knight (7)	BMO Harris Bradley Center; 7,839	0–3
4	October 15	@ Memphis	L 99–102	Brandon Knight (19)	John Henson (12)	Henson & Knight (4)	FedExForum; 11,164	0–4
5	October 21	@ Chicago	L 84–105	Gary Neal (14)	John Henson (8)	Middleton, Neal, Knight (2)	United Center; 21,203	0–5
6	October 23	New York	W 105–95	Caron Butler (24)	Zaza Pachulia (9)	Luke Ridnour (11)	Resch Center; 5,609	1–5
7	October 25	Toronto	W 14–9	Khris Middleton (8)	Zaza Pachulia (2)	John Henson (2)	BMO Harris Bradley Center	2–5

2013–14 season schedule

== Regular season ==
=== Game log ===
2013–14 game log
Total: 15–67 (Home: 10–31; Road: 5–36)
October: 0–1 (home: 0–0; road: 0–1)

Game	Date	Team	Score	High points	High rebounds	High assists	Location Attendance	Record
1	October 30	@ New York	L 83–90	Gary Neal (16)	Zaza Pachulia (11)	Gary Neal (5)	Madison Square Garden; 19,812	0–1

November : 3–12 (home: 2–6; road: 1–6)

Game	Date	Team	Score	High points	High rebounds	High assists	Location Attendance	Record
2	November 1	@ Boston	W 105–98	Zaza Pachulia (20)	John Henson & Pachulia (9)	Nate Wolters (6)	TD Garden; 18,624	1–1
3	November 2	Toronto	L 90–97	O. J. Mayo (16)	Butler & Mayo (6)	Nate Wolters (10)	BMO Harris Bradley Center; 16,046	1–2
4	November 6	Cleveland	W 109–104	O. J. Mayo (28)	Henson & Pachulia (9)	Zaza Pachulia (7)	BMO Harris Bradley Center; 14,340	2–2
5	November 9	Dallas	L 83–91	O. J. Mayo (28)	Caron Butler (13)	Nate Wolters (5)	BMO Harris Bradley Center; 16,448	2–3
6	November 12	@ Miami	L 95–118	Henson & Neal (18)	Khris Middleton (7)	Brandon Knight (6)	American Airlines Arena; 19,600	2–4
7	November 13	@ Orlando	L 91–94	O. J. Mayo (25)	John Henson (9)	Khris Middleton (4)	Amway Center; 13,588	2–5
8	November 15	@ Indiana	L 77–104	O. J. Mayo (20)	Zaza Pachulia (11)	Nate Wolters (5)	Bankers Life Fieldhouse; 16,202	2–6
9	November 16	Oklahoma City	L 79–92	O. J. Mayo (22)	Zaza Pachulia (13)	Luke Ridnour (5)	BMO Harris Bradley Center; 15,984	2–7
10	November 20	Portland	L 82–91	Luke Ridnour (13)	Zaza Pachulia (8)	Luke Ridnour (5)	BMO Harris Bradley Center; 11,789	2–8
11	November 22	@ Philadelphia	L 107–115 (OT)	Caron Butler (38)	Caron Butler (8)	Luke Ridnour (9)	Wells Fargo Center; 13,588	2–9
12	November 23	Charlotte	L 72–96	Khris Middleton (20)	John Henson (9)	Brandon Knight (7)	BMO Harris Bradley Center; 14,871	2–10
13	November 25	@ Detroit	L 94–113	John Henson (15)	John Henson (7)	Brandon Knight (4)	Palace of Auburn Hills; 12,150	2–11
14	November 27	Washington	L 92–100 (OT)	O. J. Mayo (21)	Zaza Pachulia (10)	Brandon Knight (5)	BMO Harris Bradley Center; 11,584	2–12
15	November 29	@ Charlotte	L 76–92	Brandon Knight (17)	Ekpe Udoh (6)	Khris Middleton (3)	Time Warner Cable Arena; 15,081	2–13
16	November 30	Boston	W 92–85	O. J. Mayo (22)	John Henson (13)	Brandon Knight (8)	BMO Harris Bradley Center; 15,471	3–13

December : 4–11 (home: 1–6; road: 3–5)

Game	Date	Team	Score	High points	High rebounds	High assists	Location Attendance	Record
17	December 3	@ Boston	L 100–108	O. J. Mayo (19)	Ersan İlyasova (7)	Brandon Knight (6)	TD Garden; 16,649	3–14
18	December 4	Detroit	L 98–105	Ersan İlyasova (22)	Ersan İlyasova (10)	Luke Ridnour (8)	BMO Harris Bradley Center; 12,835	3–15
19	December 6	@ Washington	W 109–105 (OT)	Khris Middleton (29)	John Henson (17)	Brandon Knight (6)	Verizon Center; 18,194	4–15
20	December 7	Brooklyn	L 82–90	O. J. Mayo (22)	John Henson (7)	O. J. Mayo (5)	BMO Harris Bradley Center; 14,963	4–16
21	December 10	@ Chicago	W 78–74	John Henson (25)	John Henson (14)	O. J. Mayo (7)	United Center; 21,303	5–16
22	December 11	San Antonio	L 77–109	Nate Wolters (18)	John Henson (8)	Nate Wolters (7)	BMO Harris Bradley Center; 11,087	5–17
23	December 13	Chicago	L 90–91	Gary Neal (17)	Giannis Antetokounmpo (9)	Brandon Knight (4)	BMO Harris Bradley Center; 15,219	5–18
24	December 14	@ Dallas	L 93–106	John Henson (18)	John Henson (13)	Giannis Antetokounmpo (4)	American Airlines Center; 19,973	5–19
25	December 18	New York	L 101–107 (2OT)	Brandon Knight (36)	John Henson (14)	Brandon Knight (3)	BMO Harris Bradley Center; 11,869	5–20
26	December 20	@ Cleveland	L 111–114 (OT)	O. J. Mayo (20)	Brandon Knight (14)	Brandon Knight (8)	Quicken Loans Arena; 19,058	5–21
27	December 21	Philadelphia	W 116–106	Khris Middleton (27)	Caron Butler (13)	Brandon Knight (8)	BMO Harris Bradley Center; 14,541	6–21
28	December 23	@ Charlotte	L 110–111 (OT)	Brandon Knight (26)	Brandon Knight (8)	Brandon Knight (14)	Time Warner Cable Arena; 13,534	6–22
29	December 27	@ Brooklyn	L 93–104	Giannis Antetokounmpo (16)	Giannis Antetokounmpo (10)	Brandon Knight, Luke Ridnour (5)	Barclays Center; 17,732	6–23
30	December 28	Minnesota	L 95–117	Khris Middleton (23)	Larry Sanders (10)	Brandon Knight (5)	BMO Harris Bradley Center; 14,971	6–24
31	December 31	@ L.A. Lakers	W 94–79	Brandon Knight (37)	Ersan İlyasova (12)	Larry Sanders (5)	Staples Center; 18,997	7–24

January : 1–14 (home: 1–6; road: 0–8)

Game	Date	Team	Score	High points	High rebounds	High assists	Location Attendance	Record
32	January 2	@ Utah	L 87–96	Larry Sanders (16)	Larry Sanders (8)	Luke Ridnour (8)	EnergySolutions Arena; 16,012	7–25
33	January 4	@ Phoenix	L 100–116	Brandon Knight (25)	Khris Middleton (8)	Brandon Knight (8)	US Airways Center; 14,344	7–26
34	January 7	Golden State	L 80–101	Ersan İlyasova (20)	Ersan İlyasova (6)	Giannis Antetokounmpo (5)	BMO Harris Bradley Center; 11,739	7–27
35	January 10	Chicago	L 72–81	O. J. Mayo (16)	Larry Sanders (9)	Luke Ridnour (8)	BMO Harris Bradley Center; 15,148	7–28
36	January 11	@ Oklahoma City	L 85–101	O. J. Mayo (16)	Giannis Antetokounmpo (11)	Giannis Antetokounmpo (5)	Chesapeake Energy Arena; 18,203	7–29
37	January 13	@ Toronto	L 94–116	Ersan İlyasova (29)	Ersan İlyasova (9)	Luke Ridnour (7)	Air Canada Centre; 15,819	7–30
38	January 15	Memphis	L 77–82	Brandon Knight (27)	Ersan İlyasova (13)	Luke Ridnour (9)	BMO Harris Bradley Center; 11,379	7–31
39	January 18	@ Houston	L 104–114	Brandon Knight (26)	John Henson (15)	Brandon Knight (7)	Toyota Center; 18,082	7–32
40	January 19	@ San Antonio	L 82–110	Brandon Knight (21)	John Henson (11)	Luke Ridnour (3)	AT&T Center; 18,096	7–33
41	January 22	Detroit	W 104–101	Caron Butler (30)	Miroslav Raduljica (8)	Brandon Knight (9)	BMO Harris Bradley Center; 11,266	8–33
42	January 24	@ Cleveland	L 78–93	Khris Middleton (13)	Giannis Antetokounmpo (7)	O. J. Mayo (6)	Quicken Loans Arena; 17,147	8–34
43	January 25	Atlanta	L 87–112	Brandon Knight (27)	Ersan İlyasova (13)	Brandon Knight (5)	BMO Harris Bradley Center; 15,879	8–35
44	January 27	L.A. Clippers	L 86–114	Ersan İlyasova (16)	Ilyasova & Henson (8)	Brandon Knight (7)	BMO Harris Bradley Center; 11,126	8–36
45	January 29	Phoenix	L 117–126	Ersan İlyasova (27)	Larry Sanders (9)	Brandon Knight (8)	BMO Harris Bradley Center; 11,175	8–37
46	January 31	@ Orlando	L 102–113	Caron Butler (20)	Larry Sanders (9)	Nate Wolters (9)	Amway Center; 17,292	8–38

February : 3–8 (home: 2–5; road: 1–3)

Game	Date	Team	Score	High points	High rebounds	High assists	Location Attendance	Record
47	February 1	@ Memphis	L 90–99	Brandon Knight (23)	Ersan İlyasova (13)	Brandon Knight (7)	FedExForum; 17,017	8–39
48	February 3	New York	W 101–98	Brandon Knight (25)	Larry Sanders (11)	Brandon Knight (7)	BMO Harris Bradley Center; 11,147	9–39
49	February 5	@ Denver	L 100–110	Sanders & Middleton (25)	Larry Sanders (15)	Brandon Knight (8)	Pepsi Center; 15,122	9–40
50	February 8	Houston	L 95–101	Brandon Knight (23)	Henson & Pachulia (10)	Khris Middleton (8)	BMO Harris Bradley Center; 15,923	9–41
51	February 10	Boston	L 86–102	Brandon Knight (22)	Zaza Pachulia (8)	Knight & Pachulia (4)	BMO Harris Bradley Center; 11,016	9–42
52	February 12	New Orleans	L 98–102	Brandon Knight (22)	Ersan İlyasova (9)	Brandon Knight (9)	BMO Harris Bradley Center; 11,012	9–43
All-Star Break
53	February 18	Orlando	W 104–100	Caron Butler (21)	John Henson (10)	Nate Wolters (8)	BMO Harris Bradley Center; 11,106	10–43
54	February 20	Denver	L 90–101	Caron Butler (17)	Ersan İlyasova (11)	Nate Wolters (5)	BMO Harris Bradley Center; 11,186	10–44
55	February 22	Indiana	L 100–110	Brandon Knight (30)	Jeff Adrien (11)	Brandon Knight (8)	BMO Harris Bradley Center; 17,165	10–45
56	February 24	@ Philadelphia	W 130–110	O. J. Mayo (25)	Jeff Adrien (10)	Ramon Sessions (5)	Wells Fargo Center; 12,216	11–45
57	February 27	@ Indiana	L 96–101	Brandon Knight (23)	Ersan İlyasova (11)	Knight & Sessions (5)	Bankers Life Fieldhouse; 17,892	11–46

March : 3–14 (home: 3–6; road: 0–8)

Game	Date	Team	Score	High points	High rebounds	High assists	Location Attendance	Record
58	March 1	Brooklyn	L 98–107	Middleton & Sessions (16)	Ersan İlyasova (11)	Brandon Knight (5)	BMO Harris Bradley Center; 14,081	11–47
59	March 3	Utah	W 114–88	Ersan İlyasova (31)	Jeff Adrien (11)	Henson, Wolters & Knight (5)	BMO Harris Bradley Center; 10,022	12–47
60	March 5	Sacramento	L 102–116	Brandon Knight (25)	John Henson (7)	Brandon Knight (6)	BMO Harris Bradley Center; 11,079	12–48
61	March 7	@ New Orleans	L 104–112	Khris Middleton (25)	Jeff Adrien (10)	Brandon Knight (5)	Smoothie King Center; 16,061	12–49
62	March 8	Washington	L 107–114	Brandon Knight (25)	Ilyasova & Adrien (8)	Nate Wolters (4)	BMO Harris Bradley Center; 14,839	12–50
63	March 10	Orlando	W 105–98	Brandon Knight (24)	Ersan İlyasova (11)	Ramon Sessions (8)	BMO Harris Bradley Center; 10,114	13–50
64	March 11	@ Minnesota	L 101–112	Brandon Knight (21)	John Henson (8)	Zaza Pachulia (10)	Target Center; 12,473	13–51
65	March 13	@ Atlanta	L 97–102	Ersan İlyasova (22)	Ersan İlyasova (10)	Giannis Antetokounmpo (5)	Philips Arena; 12,554	13–52
66	March 15	@ New York	L 94–115	Nate Wolters (15)	Jeff Adrien (7)	Pachulia & Sessions (4)	Madison Square Garden; 19,812	13–53
67	March 16	Charlotte	L 92–101	Brandon Knight (21)	Zaza Pachulia (9)	Brandon Knight (7)	BMO Harris Bradley Center; 14,536	13–54
68	March 18	@ Portland	L 115–120 (OT)	Brandon Knight (24)	Zaza Pachulia (13)	Nate Wolters (6)	Moda Center; 19,572	13–55
69	March 20	@ Golden State	L 110–115	Brandon Knight (27)	Giannis Antetokounmpo (8)	Brandon Knight (6)	Oracle Arena; 19,596	13–56
70	March 23	@ Sacramento	L 107–124	O. J. Mayo (21)	Giannis Antetokounmpo (6)	Brandon Knight (7)	Sleep Train Arena; 16,341	13–57
71	March 24	@ L.A. Clippers	L 98–106	Ramon Sessions (28)	Adrien & Henson (7)	Zaza Pachulia (8)	Staples Center; 19,060	13–58
72	March 27	L.A. Lakers	W 108–105	Brandon Knight (30)	Jeff Adrien (9)	Ramon Sessions (5)	BMO Harris Bradley Center; 15,439	14–58
73	March 29	Miami	L 67–88	Ramon Sessions (15)	John Henson (10)	Brandon Knight (5)	BMO Harris Bradley Center; 17,986	14–59
74	March 31	@ Detroit	L 111–116	Brandon Knight (25)	Zaza Pachulia (13)	Ramon Sessions (11)	Palace of Auburn Hills; 13,062	14–60

April : 1–7 (home: 1–3; road: 0–4)

Game	Date	Team	Score	High points	High rebounds	High assists	Location Attendance	Record
75	April 2	@ Miami	L 77–96	Ramon Sessions (19)	Zaza Pachulia (16)	Ramon Sessions (6)	American Airlines Arena; 19,609	14–61
76	April 4	@ Chicago	L 90–102	Brandon Knight (22)	Pachulia & Adrien (9)	Giannis Antetokounmpo (5)	United Center; 21,996	14–62
77	April 5	Toronto	L 98–102	John Henson (23)	Jeff Adrien (12)	Ramon Sessions (10)	BMO Harris Bradley Center; 16,310	14–63
78	April 9	Indiana	L 102–104	Brandon Knight (25)	Jeff Adrien (17)	Brandon Knight (10)	BMO Harris Bradley Center; 13,139	14–64
79	April 11	Cleveland	W 119–116	Brandon Knight (24)	Jeff Adrien (9)	Ramon Sessions (7)	BMO Harris Bradley Center; 13,126	15–64
80	April 12	@ Washington	L 91–104	Middleton & Sessions (20)	Jeff Adrien (10)	Ramon Sessions (8)	Verizon Center; 17,278	15–65
81	April 14	@ Toronto	L 100–110	Ramon Sessions (21)	Jeff Adrien (9)	Ramon Sessions (5)	Air Canada Centre; 18,821	15–66
82	April 16	Atlanta	L 103–111	Brandon Knight (31)	Khris Middleton (7)	Ramon Sessions (6)	BMO Harris Bradley Center; 13,111	15–67

2013–14 season schedule

=== Standings ===
Central Division	W	L	PCT	GB	Home	Road	Div	GP
c-Indiana Pacers	56	26	.683	–	35‍–‍6	21‍–‍20	12–4	82
x-Chicago Bulls	48	34	.585	8.0	27‍–‍14	21‍–‍20	11–5	82
Cleveland Cavaliers	33	49	.402	23.0	19‍–‍22	14‍–‍27	7–9	82
Detroit Pistons	29	53	.354	27.0	17‍–‍24	12‍–‍29	6–10	82
Milwaukee Bucks	15	67	.183	41.0	10‍–‍31	5‍–‍36	4–12	82

Eastern Conference
#	Team	W	L	PCT	GB	GP
1	c-Indiana Pacers *	56	26	.683	–	82
2	y-Miami Heat *	54	28	.659	2.0	82
3	y-Toronto Raptors *	48	34	.585	8.0	82
4	x-Chicago Bulls	48	34	.585	8.0	82
5	x-Washington Wizards	44	38	.537	12.0	82
6	x-Brooklyn Nets	44	38	.537	12.0	82
7	x-Charlotte Bobcats	43	39	.524	13.0	82
8	x-Atlanta Hawks	38	44	.463	18.0	82
9	New York Knicks	37	45	.451	19.0	82
10	Cleveland Cavaliers	33	49	.402	23.0	82
11	Detroit Pistons	29	53	.354	27.0	82
12	Boston Celtics	25	57	.305	31.0	82
13	Orlando Magic	23	59	.280	33.0	82
14	Philadelphia 76ers	19	63	.232	37.0	82
15	Milwaukee Bucks	15	67	.183	41.0	82

== Playoffs ==
The Bucks failed to qualify for the playoffs for the second time in three years.

== Player statistics ==
Legend
GP	Games played	GS	Games started	MPG	Minutes per game
FG%	Field-goal percentage	3P%	3-point field-goal percentage	FT%	Free-throw percentage
RPG	Rebounds per game	APG	Assists per game	SPG	Steals per game
BPG	Blocks per game	PPG	Points per game

=== Regular season ===
Milwaukee Bucks statistics
Player	GP	GS	MPG	FG%	3P%	FT%	RPG	APG	SPG	BPG	PPG
Khris Middleton	82	64	30.0	.440	.414	.861	3.8	2.1	1.0	.2	12.1
Giannis Antetokounmpo	77	23	24.6	.414	.347	.683	4.4	1.9	.8	.8	6.8
Brandon Knight	72	69	33.3	.422	.325	.802	3.5	4.9	1.0	.2	17.9
John Henson	70	23	26.5	.538	.000	.514	7.1	1.6	.6	1.7	11.1
Nate Wolters	58	31	22.6	.437	.290	.656	2.6	3.2	.6	.3	7.2
Ersan İlyasova	55	47	26.9	.409	.282	.823	6.2	1.3	.8	.1	11.2
Zaza Pachulia	53	43	25.0	.427	.000	.846	6.3	2.6	.8	.3	7.7
O. J. Mayo	52	23	25.9	.407	.370	.864	2.4	2.2	.5	.3	11.7
Miroslav Raduljica	48	2	9.7	.540		.818	2.3	.5	.1	.3	3.8
Ekpe Udoh	42	14	19.1	.399		.638	3.5	.7	.4	1.0	3.4
Luke Ridnour^{†}	36	12	21.2	.384	.368	.684	1.7	3.4	.6	.1	5.7
Caron Butler^{†}	34	13	24.1	.387	.361	.839	4.6	1.6	.7	.3	11.0
Gary Neal^{†}	30	2	20.2	.390	.360	.833	1.7	1.5	.2	.0	10.0
Ramon Sessions^{†}	28	12	32.5	.461	.357	.841	3.1	4.8	.6	.1	15.8
Jeff Adrien^{†}	28	12	25.2	.515		.670	7.8	1.1	.6	.8	10.9
Larry Sanders	23	20	25.4	.469	.000	.473	7.2	.8	.8	1.7	7.7
Chris Wright	8	0	15.8	.600	.000	.400	2.5	.6	.9	.6	6.0
D. J. Stephens	3	0	5.0	.429		1.000	1.7	.0	.0	.0	2.3
Tony Mitchell	3	0	3.3	.600	.000		.3	.3	.3	.0	2.0

- ^{†} Denotes player spent time with another team in the season. Stats reflect time with the Bucks only.

== Transactions ==
=== Trades ===
June 28, 2013	To Milwaukee Bucks Draft rights to 38th pick Nate Wolters	To Philadelphia 76ers Draft rights to 43rd pick Ricky Ledo; 2014 second-round draft pick
July 12, 2013	To Milwaukee Bucks 2nd-round draft pick	To Sacramento Kings Luc Mbah a Moute
July 31, 2013	To Milwaukee Bucks Brandon Knight; Khris Middleton; Viacheslav Kravtsov	To Detroit Pistons Brandon Jennings
August 29, 2013	To Milwaukee Bucks Caron Butler	To Phoenix Suns Ish Smith; Viacheslav Kravtsov
February 20, 2014	To Milwaukee Bucks Jeff Adrien; Ramon Sessions	To Charlotte Bobcats Gary Neal; Luke Ridnour

=== Free agents ===
Player	Signed	Former team
O. J. Mayo	July 13, 2013	Dallas Mavericks
Carlos Delfino	July 17, 2013	Houston Rockets
Zaza Pachulia	July 17, 2013	Atlanta Hawks
Miroslav Raduljica	July 26, 2013	(Turkey) Efes Pilsen
Gary Neal	July 30, 2013	San Antonio Spurs
