= Ersan İlyasova =

Turkish basketball player (born 1987)

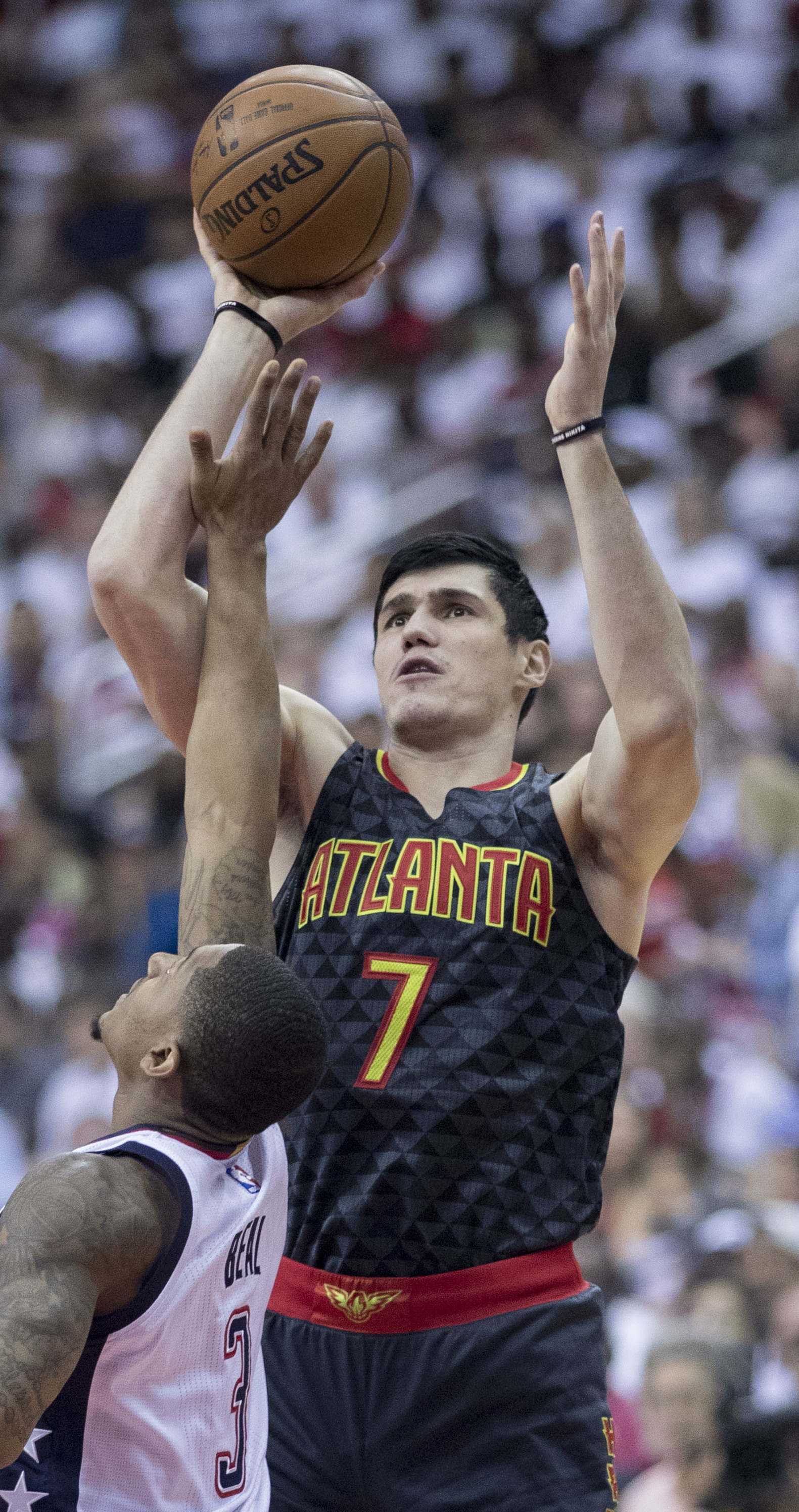
- İlyasova with the Atlanta Hawks in 2017

Personal information
- Born: 15 May 1987 (age 39) Bukhara, Uzbekistan
- Listed height: 6 ft 9 in (2.06 m)
- Listed weight: 235 lb (107 kg)

Career information
- NBA draft: 2005: 2nd round, 36th overall pick
- Drafted by: Milwaukee Bucks
- Playing career: 2003–2021
- Position: Power forward
- Number: 19, 7, 23, 77

Career history
- 2003–2004: Yeşilyurt
- 2004–2005: Ülkerspor
- 2005–2007: Milwaukee Bucks
- 2005–2006: →Tulsa 66ers
- 2007–2009: FC Barcelona
- 2009–2015: Milwaukee Bucks
- 2011: Anadolu Efes
- 2015–2016: Detroit Pistons
- 2016: Orlando Magic
- 2016: Oklahoma City Thunder
- 2016–2017: Philadelphia 76ers
- 2017–2018: Atlanta Hawks
- 2018: Philadelphia 76ers
- 2018–2020: Milwaukee Bucks
- 2021: Utah Jazz

Career highlights
- Liga ACB champion (2009); Spanish Supercup champion (2009); FIBA Europe Under-20 Championship MVP (2006); Turkish Cup champion (2005); Albert Schweitzer Tournament MVP (2004)

Career NBA statistics
- Points: 8,364 (10.1 ppg)
- Rebounds: 4,661 (5.6 rpg)
- Assists: 908 (1.1 apg)
- Stats at NBA.com
- Stats at Basketball Reference
Medals
Men's basketball
Representing Turkey
FIBA World Championship
Silver medal – second place	2010 Turkey

Ersan İlyasova (born 15 May 1987) is an Uzbek-born Turkish former professional basketball player. He played 13 seasons in the National Basketball Association (NBA), including nine seasons for the Milwaukee Bucks. He also played in his native Turkey and for FC Barcelona in Spain.

== Professional career ==
=== Yeşilyurt (2003–2004) ===
İlyasova played for Yeşilyurt in the Turkish second-division league during the 2003–04 season.

=== Ülkerspor (2004–2005) ===
İlyasova stepped up to the Turkish Basketball League for the 2004–05 season with Ülkerspor, averaging 4.5 points and 3.2 rebounds in eleven games.

=== Milwaukee Bucks (2005–2007) ===
İlyasova was selected by the Milwaukee Bucks with the 36th overall pick of the 2005 NBA draft. In July 2005, he joined the Bucks for the 2005 NBA Summer League. On 22 August 2005, he signed with the Bucks. On 14 November 2005, he was assigned to the Tulsa 66ers of the NBA Development League, an assignment that lasted the entire 2005–06 season. In 46 games for the 66ers, he averaged 12.5 points, 7.0 rebounds and 1.0 assists per game.

İlyasova made his NBA debut for the Bucks on 1 November 2006 in a 105–97 win over the Detroit Pistons. In 2006–07, he played 66 games for the Bucks, averaging 6.1 points and 2.9 rebounds per game. In June 2007, the Bucks tendered a qualifying offer to İlyasova to make him a restricted free agent.

=== Barcelona (2007–2009) ===
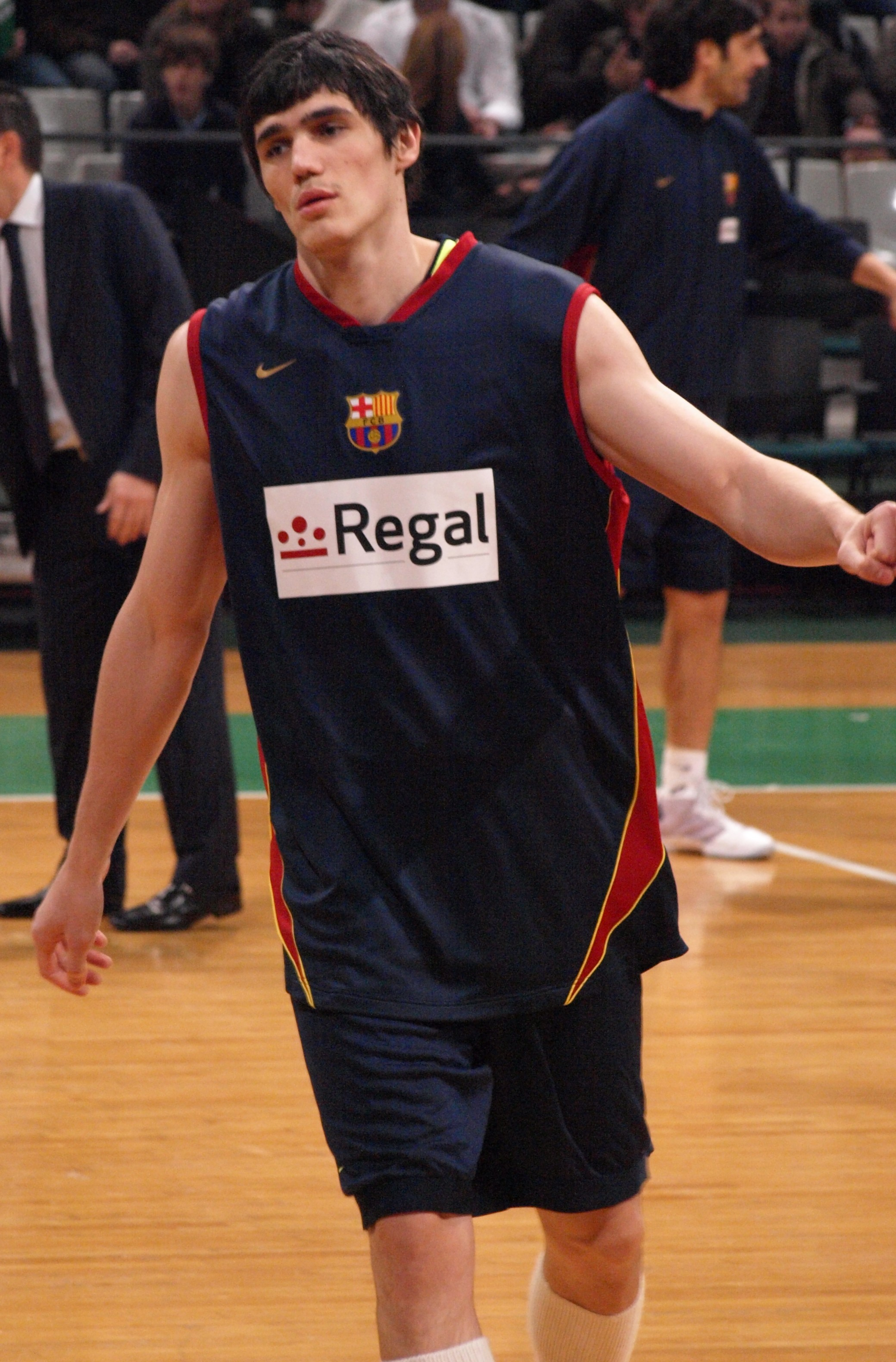
İlyasova with Barcelona in 2009

On 18 July 2007, İlyasova signed a two-year deal with FC Barcelona of the Liga ACB. In 2009, he won a championship with Barcelona.

=== Return to Milwaukee (2009–2011) ===
In July 2009, İlyasova signed a multi-year deal to return to the Milwaukee Bucks.

=== Anadolu Efes (2011) ===
On 3 August 2011, İlyasova signed with Anadolu Efes of the Turkish Basketball League for the duration of the NBA lockout.

=== Third stint with Milwaukee (2011–2015) ===
In December 2011, İlyasova returned to the Bucks following the conclusion of the lockout.

On 19 February 2012, İlyasova set new career highs with 29 points and 25 rebounds against the New Jersey Nets, becoming just the third Bucks player in franchise history to record at least 25 points and 25 rebounds in a game, after Kareem Abdul-Jabbar (10 times) and Swen Nater (once). The feat had not been achieved for more than 35 years. He subsequently earned the Player of the Week award for his performances from March 5–11.

Ilyasova later finished second in Most Improved Player voting during the Shortened 2011-12 NBA Season Behind Ryan Anderson

On 12 July 2012, İlyasova re-signed with the Bucks on a multi-year deal.

On 27 March 2014, İlyasova was ruled out for the remainder of the 2013–14 season due to a right ankle injury.

On 26 March 2015, İlyasova scored a career-high 34 points in a 111–107 win over the Indiana Pacers.

=== Detroit Pistons (2015–2016) ===
On 11 June 2015, İlyasova was traded to the Detroit Pistons in exchange for Caron Butler and Shawne Williams. The move reunited him with Brandon Jennings, with whom he played in Milwaukee. On 27 October he made his debut for the Pistons in a 106–94 win over the Atlanta Hawks, recording 16 points, seven rebounds, three assists and one block in 34 minutes.

=== Orlando Magic (2016) ===
On 16 February 2016, İlyasova was traded to the Orlando Magic, along with Brandon Jennings, in exchange for Tobias Harris. The next day, he made his debut with the Magic in a 110–104 win over the Dallas Mavericks, recording 16 points, five rebounds, two assists and one steal in 23 minutes.

=== Oklahoma City Thunder (2016) ===
On 23 June 2016, İlyasova was traded, along with Victor Oladipo and the draft rights to Domantas Sabonis, to the Oklahoma City Thunder in exchange for Serge Ibaka. He appeared in three games for the Thunder to begin the 2016–17 season.

=== Philadelphia 76ers (2016–2017) ===
On 1 November 2016, İlyasova was traded, along with a conditional first-round pick, to the Philadelphia 76ers in exchange for Jerami Grant. He made his debut for the 76ers the next day, scoring an equal team-high 14 points on 5-for-12 shooting in a 109–93 loss to the Charlotte Hornets. On 6 December he had season bests of 23 points and 17 rebounds in a 96–91 loss to the Memphis Grizzlies. He had a second 23-point game on 8 December against the New Orleans Pelicans, and a third 23-point game on 30 December against the Denver Nuggets—both resulting in wins. On 29 January 2017, he scored a season-high 31 points in a 121–108 loss to the Chicago Bulls.

=== Atlanta Hawks (2017–2018) ===
On 22 February 2017, İlyasova was traded again, this time to the Atlanta Hawks in exchange for Tiago Splitter, a protected 2017 second-round pick, and the option to swap a second-round pick.

On 21 July 2017, İlyasova re-signed with the Hawks. On 26 February 2018, he was waived by the Hawks.

=== Return to Philadelphia (2018) ===
On 28 February 2018, İlyasova signed with the Philadelphia 76ers, returning to the franchise for a second stint.

=== Fourth stint with Milwaukee (2018–2020) ===
On 16 July 2018, İlyasova signed with the Milwaukee Bucks, returning to the franchise for a fourth stint. On 16 December 2018, he sustained a fractured nose during practice, which required surgery.

On 19 November 2020, İlyasova was waived by Milwaukee.

=== Utah Jazz (2021) ===
On 11 March 2021, İlyasova signed with the Utah Jazz for the remainder of the season. On 17 April, İlyasova logged a season-high 20 points on 7-for-11 field goal shooting and 6 of 8 from three, in addition to five rebounds, four steals and two blocks across 31 minutes in a 115–127 overtime loss to the Los Angeles Lakers.

On 22 December 2021, İlyasova signed a 10-day contract with the Chicago Bulls. İlyasova entered the NBA's health and safety protocols on December 28, and did not play for the team before his contract expired.

== Career statistics ==
Legend
GP	Games played	GS	Games started	MPG	Minutes per game
FG%	Field-goal percentage	3P%	3-point field-goal percentage	FT%	Free-throw percentage
RPG	Rebounds per game	APG	Assists per game	SPG	Steals per game
BPG	Blocks per game	PPG	Points per game	PIR	Performance index rating
**Bold**	Career high	*	Led the league

=== NBA ===
==== Regular season ====
Year	Team	GP	GS	MPG	FG%	3P%	FT%	RPG	APG	SPG	BPG	PPG
2006–07	Milwaukee	66	14	14.7	.383	.365	.787	2.9	.7	.4	.3	6.1
2009–10	Milwaukee	81	31	23.4	.443	.336	.715	6.4	1.0	.7	.3	10.4
2010–11	Milwaukee	60	34	25.1	.436	.298	.894	6.1	.9	.9	.4	9.5
2011–12	Milwaukee	60	41	**27.6**	**.492**	**.455**	.781	**8.8**	1.2	.7	**.7**	13.0
2012–13	Milwaukee	73	**54**	**27.6**	.462	.444	.796	7.1	1.6	.9	.5	13.2
2013–14	Milwaukee	55	47	26.9	.409	.282	.823	6.2	1.3	.8	.1	11.2
2014–15	Milwaukee	58	36	22.7	.472	.389	.645	4.8	1.0	.6	.3	11.5
2015–16	Detroit	52	52	27.6	.425	.363	.725	5.4	1.1	.7	.5	11.3
2015–16	Orlando	22	4	20.3	.418	.409	.711	5.5	.5	.6	.3	8.1
2016–17	Oklahoma City	**3***	0	20.8	.375	.250	.000	5.3	.3	**1.0**	.3	5.0
2016–17	Philadelphia	**53***	40	27.3	.440	.359	.768	5.9	**1.8**	.6	.3	**14.8**
2016–17	Atlanta	**26***	12	24.3	.412	.348	.800	5.8	1.6	.8	.3	10.4
2017–18	Atlanta	46	40	25.5	.459	.359	.800	5.5	1.1	**1.0**	.4	10.9
2017–18	Philadelphia	23	3	24.1	.439	.361	.733	6.7	1.7	.7	.4	10.8
2018–19	Milwaukee	67	7	18.4	.438	.363	.824	4.5	.8	.5	.3	6.8
2019–20	Milwaukee	63	8	15.7	.466	.365	.828	4.8	.8	.4	.3	6.6
2020–21	Utah	17	1	8.7	.389	.439	**1.000**	1.7	.2	.6	.2	3.8
Career		825	424	23.0	.443	.367	.777	5.6	1.1	.7	.4	10.1

==== Playoffs ====
Year	Team	GP	GS	MPG	FG%	3P%	FT%	RPG	APG	SPG	BPG	PPG
2010	Milwaukee	7	0	22.4	.480	.357	.833	**7.6**	.4	.7	.1	9.7
2013	Milwaukee	4	4	**29.3**	.435	**.400**	**1.000**	7.3	**1.8**	**1.3**	.3	**11.5**
2015	Milwaukee	6	**6**	23.7	.328	.217	.700	3.8	.5	.8	**.5**	8.7
2017	Atlanta	6	0	15.0	.348	.200	.778	5.2	.3	.2	.0	4.0
2018	Philadelphia	10	1	23.3	.429	.290	.571	**7.6**	1.3	.7	.4	9.3
2019	Milwaukee	**15**	0	18.1	.432	.300	.800	4.7	1.4	.7	.4	6.8
2020	Milwaukee	3	0	7.7	.333	.200	**1.000**	1.3	.0	.7	.0	3.0
2021	Utah	1	0	3.0	**.500**	.000	**1.000**	.0	.0	.0	.0	4.0
Career		52	11	19.9	.413	.287	.753	5.5	.9	.7	.3	7.7

=== EuroLeague ===
Year	Team	GP	GS	MPG	FG%	3P%	FT%	RPG	APG	SPG	BPG	PPG	PIR
2004–05	Ülkerspor	6	0	4.8	.267	.111	.500	.5	.0	.0	.0	1.7	1.0
2007–08	FC Barcelona	**22**	8	18.1	.379	.241	.538	4.7	.7	.8	1.1	6.1	7.1
2008–09	FC Barcelona	**22**	**15**	**20.8**	.457	**.403**	**.816**	**7.0**	.8	.5	.6	**10.5**	13.0
2011–12	Anadolu Efes	8	8	20.7	**.482**	.353	.593	5.5	**.9**	**1.5**	**1.5**	9.5	**13.6**
Career		58	31	18.1	.426	.323	.667	5.2	.7	.7	.8	7.8	9.4

== National team career ==
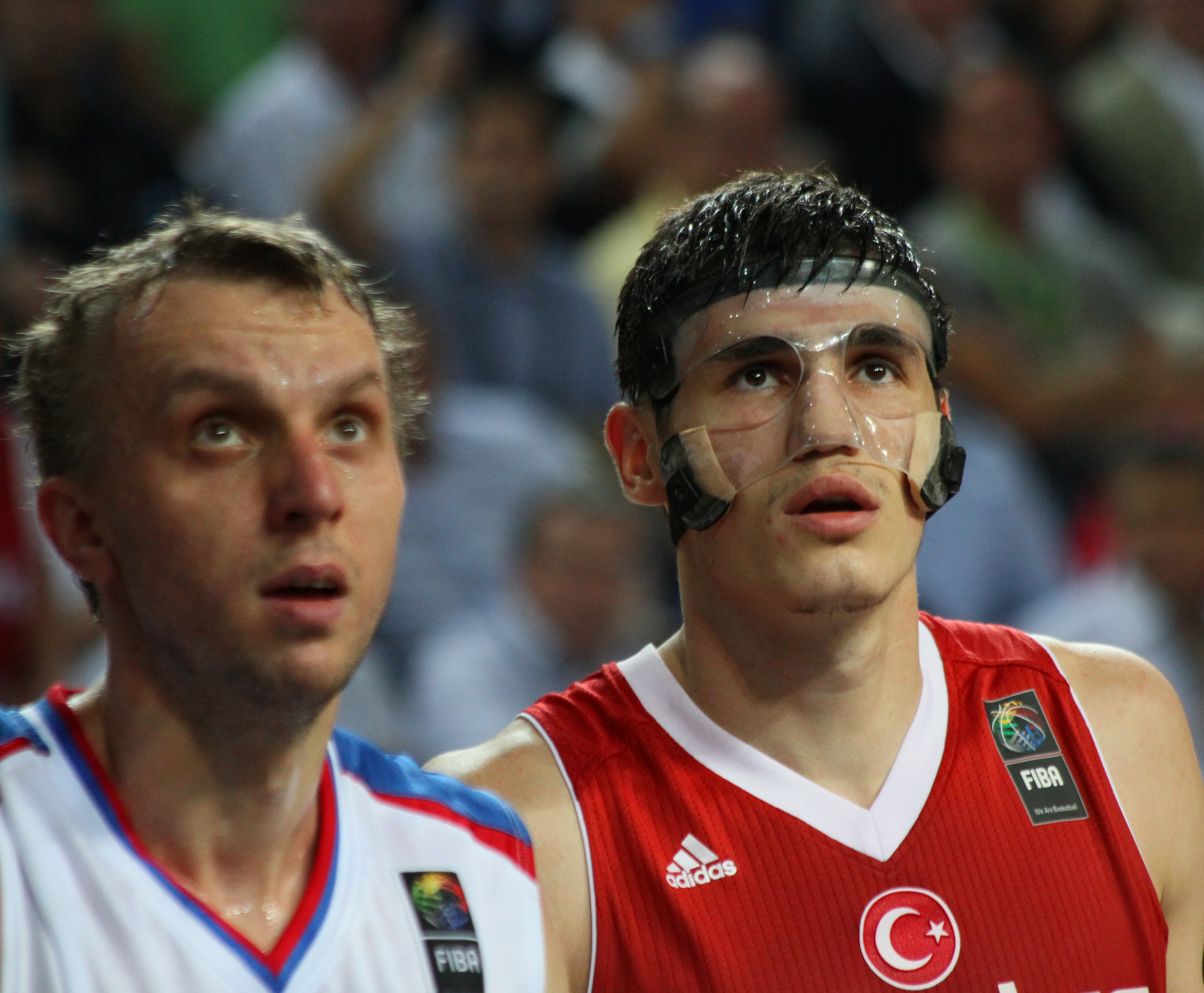
İlyasova (right) with Turkey in September 2010

Before playing for the senior Turkey national basketball team, İlyasova was named the MVP of the 2006 FIBA Europe Under-20 Championship, after leading Turkey's junior national team to a silver medal in İzmir. İlyasova has since represented Turkey at the 2006 FIBA World Championship, EuroBasket 2007, EuroBasket 2009, 2010 FIBA World Championship, EuroBasket 2011, EuroBasket 2013 and EuroBasket 2015.

== Personal life ==
İlyasova is the son of Crimean Tatar parents Anvar and Iraliye İlyasova. He is married to Julia, who was born in Belarus. They have two daughters, Catherine and Xenia, and one son, Nikita, all born in Milwaukee. İlyasova is Muslim.

=== Citizenship and age ===
Since the 2003 Turkish Junior Basketball Championship held in Konya, there has been some controversy to İlyasova's age and national origin. The controversy is fueled by the claim that a man named Arsen Ilyasov, born in 1984 in Bukhara, Uzbekistan, entered Turkey as an 18-year-old on 7 August 2002 and was never heard from again, while on 19 September 2002, a man named Semsettin Bulut claimed to have forgotten to register the birth of his now 15-year-old son, and did so as Ersan İlyasova, a Turkish citizen. This claim, that İlyasova is actually Ilyasov and should be an Uzbek player, was officially put forth by the Uzbekistan Basketball Federation in a grievance, but FIBA ruled in the Turkish Basketball Federation's favor. While this controversy was brewing, ESPN's Chad Ford referred to Ilyasova as "The 17-year-old forward from Uzbekistan is widely considered the best prospect to ever come out of Turkey." Other biographies, while not claiming an Uzbek birth, still maintain a 1984 birth year.
