= 2012–13 Detroit Pistons season =

NBA team season

- Head coach: Lawrence Frank
- President: Joe Dumars
- General manager: Joe Dumars
- Owner: Tom Gores
- Arena: The Palace of Auburn Hills

Results
- Record: 29–53 (.354)
- Place: Division: 4th (Central); Conference: 12th (Eastern)
- Playoff finish: Did not qualify
- Stats at Basketball Reference

Local media
- Television: Fox Sports Detroit
- Radio: WWJ; WXYT (AM)/FM

The 2012–13 Detroit Pistons season was the 72nd season of the franchise, the 65th in the National Basketball Association (NBA), and the 56th in Detroit.

== Draft picks ==
Round	Pick	Player	Position	Nationality	College/Team
1	9	Andre Drummond	C	United States	Connecticut
2	33	Khris Middleton	SF	United States	Texas A&M
2	44	Kim English ^{[a]}	SG	United States	Missouri

^{a} Pick acquired from the Houston Rockets on June 25, 2009, in exchange for the draft rights to Chase Budinger.

== Roster ==
2012–13 Detroit Pistons roster
Players

Pos.	No.	Player	Height	Weight	DOB	From
PG	12	Will Bynum	6 ft 0 in (1.83 m)	185 lb (84 kg)	1983-01-04	Georgia Tech
PG	8	José Calderón	6 ft 3 in (1.91 m)	211 lb (96 kg)	1981-09-28	Spain
C	1	Andre Drummond	6 ft 10 in (2.08 m)	270 lb (122 kg)	1993-08-10	Connecticut
SG	24	Kim English (DL)	6 ft 6 in (1.98 m)	200 lb (91 kg)	1988-09-24	Missouri
PF	33	Jonas Jerebko	6 ft 10 in (2.08 m)	231 lb (105 kg)	1987-03-02	Sweden
PG	7	Brandon Knight	6 ft 3 in (1.91 m)	189 lb (86 kg)	1991-12-02	Kentucky
C	55	Viacheslav Kravtsov	6 ft 11 in (2.11 m)	247 lb (112 kg)	1987-08-25	Ukraine
SF	50	Corey Maggette	6 ft 6 in (1.98 m)	225 lb (102 kg)	1979-11-12	Duke
PF	54	Jason Maxiell	6 ft 7 in (2.01 m)	260 lb (118 kg)	1983-02-18	Cincinnati
SG	32	Khris Middleton (DL)	6 ft 7 in (2.01 m)	215 lb (98 kg)		Texas A&M
C	10	Greg Monroe	6 ft 11 in (2.11 m)	250 lb (113 kg)	1990-06-04	Georgetown
SF	25	Kyle Singler	6 ft 8 in (2.03 m)	230 lb (104 kg)	1988-05-04	Duke
SG	3	Rodney Stuckey	6 ft 5 in (1.96 m)	205 lb (93 kg)	1986-04-21	Eastern Washington
PF	31	Charlie Villanueva	6 ft 11 in (2.11 m)	232 lb (105 kg)	1984-08-24	Connecticut

Coaches
Head coach
- Lawrence Frank
Assistant(s)
- Dee Brown
- John Loyer
- Mike Abdenour (trainer)

Legend
- (DP) Unsigned draft pick
- (FA) Free agent
- (S) Suspended
- (DL) On assignment to D-League affiliate
- Injured

Roster
Updated: January 30, 2013

== Pre-season ==
2012 pre-season game log
Pre-season: 4–4 (home: 4–0; road: 0–4)

Game	Date	Team	Score	High points	High rebounds	High assists	Location Attendance	Record
1	October 10	Toronto	W 101–99	Greg Monroe (17)	Greg Monroe (10)	Will Bynum (7)	The Palace of Auburn Hills; 9,532	1–0
2	October 12	@ Toronto	L 75–82	Rodney Stuckey (14)	Austin Daye (9)	Brandon Knight (5)	Air Canada Centre; 10,167	1–1
3	October 13	@ Milwaukee	L 91–108	Andre Drummond (19)	Andre Drummond (10)	Brandon Knight (8)	BMO Harris Bradley Center; 5,213	1–2
4	October 16	Orlando	W 112–86	Rodney Stuckey (19)	Jason Maxiell (8)	Rodney Stuckey (5)	The Palace of Auburn Hills; 9,229	2–2
5	October 18	@ Miami	L 78–105	Greg Monroe (15)	Andre Drummond (8)	Brandon Knight (4)	American Airlines Arena; 19,600	2–3
6	October 20	Charlotte	W 85–80	Rodney Stuckey (16)	Andre Drummond, Greg Monroe (7)	Greg Monroe, Rodney Stuckey (4)	The Palace of Auburn Hills; 9,923	3–3
7	October 24	@ Minnesota	L 76–95	Rodney Stuckey (21)	Brandon Knight (6)	Brandon Knight (3)	MTS Centre; 12,163	3–4
8	October 26	Atlanta	W 104–88	Brandon Knight, Greg Monroe (16)	Greg Monroe (11)	Will Bynum (7)	The Palace of Auburn Hills; 10,825	4–4

2012–13 season schedule

== Regular season ==
=== Game log ===
2012–13 game log
Total: 29–53 (Home: 18–23; Road: 11–30)
October: 0–1 (home: 0–1; road: 0–0)

Game	Date	Team	Score	High points	High rebounds	High assists	Location Attendance	Record
1	October 31	Houston	L 96–105	Brandon Knight (15)	Maxiell & Monroe (8)	Rodney Stuckey (6)	The Palace of Auburn Hills; 16,646	0–1

November : 5–11 (home: 4–2; road: 1–9)

Game	Date	Team	Score	High points	High rebounds	High assists	Location Attendance	Record
2	November 2	@ Phoenix	L 89–92	Tayshaun Prince (18)	Andre Drummond (8)	Brandon Knight (10)	US Airways Center; 15,107	0–2
3	November 4	@ L. A. Lakers	L 79–108	Jonas Jerebko (18)	Drummond & Monroe (7)	Brandon Knight (6)	Staples Center; 18,997	0–3
4	November 6	@ Denver	L 97–109	Greg Monroe (27)	Greg Monroe (10)	Brandon Knight (9)	Pepsi Center; 19,155	0–4
5	November 7	@ Sacramento	L 103–105	Monroe & Knight (21)	Greg Monroe (12)	Greg Monroe (11)	Power Balance Pavilion; 10,185	0–5
6	November 9	@ Oklahoma City	L 94–105	Andre Drummond (22)	Greg Monroe (10)	Monroe, Knight & Stuckey (6)	Chesapeake Energy Arena; 18,203	0–6
7	November 10	@ Houston	L 82–96	Brandon Knight (16)	Greg Monroe (11)	Brandon Knight (7)	Toyota Center; 15,037	0–7
8	November 12	Oklahoma City	L 90–92	Rodney Stuckey (19)	Jason Maxiell (7)	Brandon Knight (6)	The Palace of Auburn Hills; 12,784	0–8
9	November 14	@ Philadelphia	W 94–76	Greg Monroe (19)	Greg Monroe (18)	Brandon Knight (7)	Wells Fargo Center; 11,879	1–8
10	November 16	Orlando	L 106–110	Greg Monroe (23)	Greg Monroe (7)	Brandon Knight (12)	The Palace of Auburn Hills; 11,594	1–9
11	November 18	Boston	W 103–83	Greg Monroe (20)	Greg Monroe (13)	Bynum & Stuckey (5)	The Palace of Auburn Hills; 12,214	2–9
12	November 21	@ Orlando	L 74–90	Greg Monroe (19)	Monroe & Prince (8)	Brandon Knight (5)	Amway Center; 17,199	2–10
13	November 23	Toronto	W 91–90	Greg Monroe (19)	Andre Drummond (13)	Greg Monroe (5)	The Palace of Auburn Hills; 12,778	3–10
14	November 25	@ New York	L 100–121	Brandon Knight (21)	Andre Drummond (11)	Greg Monroe (7)	Madison Square Garden; 19,033	3–11
15	November 26	Portland	W 108–101	Brandon Knight (26)	Monroe & Singler(10)	Kyle Singler (5)	The Palace of Auburn Hills; 10,212	4–11
16	November 28	Phoenix	W 117–77	Knight & Villanueva (19)	Andre Drummond (9)	Brandon Knight (6)	The Palace of Auburn Hills; 10,517	5–11
17	November 30	@ Memphis	L 78–90	Greg Monroe (17)	Monroe & Maxiell (9)	Tayshaun Prince (4)	FedExForum; 16,732	5–12

December : 6–10 (home: 4–5; road: 2–5)

Game	Date	Team	Score	High points	High rebounds	High assists	Location Attendance	Record
18	December 1	@ Dallas	L 77–92	Brandon Knight (20)	Greg Monroe (15)	Rodney Stuckey (6)	American Airlines Center; 20,285	5–13
19	December 3	Cleveland	W 89–79	Brandon Knight (17)	Greg Monroe (14)	Rodney Stuckey (6)	The Palace of Auburn Hills; 11,352	6–13
20	December 5	Golden State	L 97–104	Tayshaun Prince (24)	Andre Drummond (12)	Rodney Stuckey (9)	The Palace of Auburn Hills; 11,128	6–14
21	December 7	Chicago	L 104–108	Rodney Stuckey (24)	Jason Maxiell (9)	Rodney Stuckey (7)	The Palace of Auburn Hills; 17,142	6–15
22	December 8	@ Cleveland	W 104–97	Brandon Knight (30)	Tayshaun Prince (8)	Rodney Stuckey (6)	Quicken Loans Arena; 16,062	7–15
23	December 10	@ Philadelphia	L 97–104	Monroe & Knight (22)	Jason Maxiell (11)	Rodney Stuckey (5)	Wells Fargo Center; 15,225	7–16
24	December 11	Denver	L 94–101	Brandon Knight (20)	Greg Monroe (12)	Brandon Knight (5)	The Palace of Auburn Hills; 10,265	7–17
25	December 14	@ Brooklyn	L 105–107	Brandon Knight (22)	Tayshaun Prince (10)	Tayshaun Prince (6)	Barclays Center; 15,797	7–18
26	December 15	Indiana	L 77–88	Greg Monroe (18)	Andre Drummond (9)	Rodney Stuckey (7)	The Palace of Auburn Hills; 13,235	7–19
27	December 17	L. A. Clippers	L 76–88	Brandon Knight (16)	Monroe & Prince (7)	Greg Monroe (6)	The Palace of Auburn Hills; 13,560	7-20
28	December 19	@ Toronto	L 91–97	Greg Monroe (35)	Greg Monroe (10)	Brandon Knight (6)	Air Canada Centre; 17,062	7-21
29	December 21	Washington	W 100–68	Monroe & Knight (15)	Andre Drummond (14)	Rodney Stuckey (5)	The Palace of Auburn Hills; 13,489	8-21
30	December 22	@ Washington	W 96–87	Charlie Villanueva (19)	Andre Drummond (11)	Rodney Stuckey (8)	Verizon Center; 13,104	9-21
31	December 26	@ Atlanta	L 119–126	Will Bynum (31)	Andre Drummond (12)	Rodney Stuckey (11)	Philips Arena; 15,182	9-22
32	December 28	Miami	W 109–99	Will Bynum (25)	Andre Drummond (10)	Will Bynum (10)	The Palace of Auburn Hills; 22,076	10–22
33	December 30	Milwaukee	W 96–94	Tayshaun Prince (20)	Monroe & Maxiell (10)	Will Bynum (5)	The Palace of Auburn Hills; 14,219	11–22

January : 6–7 (home: 4–4; road: 2–3)

Game	Date	Team	Score	High points	High rebounds	High assists	Location Attendance	Record
34	January 1	Sacramento	W 103–97	Brandon Knight (20)	Greg Monroe (11)	Knight & Bynum (4)	The Palace of Auburn Hills; 12,175	12–22
35	January 4	Atlanta	W 85–84	Austin Daye (20)	Jason Maxiell (10)	Will Bynum (5)	The Palace of Auburn Hills; 14,832	13–22
36	January 6	Charlotte	L 101–108	Tayshaun Prince (21)	Greg Monroe (14)	Will Bynum (9)	The Palace of Auburn Hills; 11,963	13–23
37	January 11	@ Milwaukee	W 103–87	Greg Monroe (26)	Monroe & Drummond (11)	Brandon Knight (5)	BMO Harris Bradley Center; 15,681	14–23
38	January 12	Utah	L 87–90	Brandon Knight (16)	Greg Monroe (11)	Will Bynum (4)	The Palace of Auburn Hills; 18,441	14–24
39	January 17	New York	L 87–102	Will Bynum (22)	Monroe & Drummond (10)	Greg Monroe (5)	The O2 Arena; 18,689	14–25
40	January 20	Boston	W 103–88	Andre Drummond (16)	Greg Monroe (11)	Monroe, Singler, Knight & Bynum (5)	The Palace of Auburn Hills; 17,575	15–25
41	January 22	Orlando	W 105–90	Brandon Knight (18)	Maxiell & Drummond (11)	Will Bynum (6)	The Palace of Auburn Hills; 11,798	16–25
42	January 23	@ Chicago	L 82–85	Brandon Knight (13)	Jason Maxiell (11)	Brandon Knight (7)	United Center; 21,567	16–26
43	January 25	@ Miami	L 88–110	Greg Monroe (31)	Greg Monroe (12)	Brandon Knight (5)	American Airlines Arena; 20,236	16–27
44	January 27	@ Orlando	W 104–102	Brandon Knight (31)	Greg Monroe (7)	Greg Monroe (6)	Amway Center; 17,959	17–27
45	January 29	Milwaukee	L 90–117	Andre Drummond (18)	Andre Drummond (18)	Greg Monroe (4)	The Palace of Auburn Hills; 15,479	17–28
46	January 30	@ Indiana	L 79–98	Greg Monroe (18)	Andre Drummond (14)	Brandon Knight (4)	Bankers Life Fieldhouse; 12,137	17–29

February : 6–8 (home: 3–6; road: 3–2)

Game	Date	Team	Score	High points	High rebounds	High assists	Location Attendance	Record
47	February 1	Cleveland	W 117–99	Knight & Singler (20)	Greg Monroe (16)	Brandon Knight (10)	The Palace of Auburn Hills; 15,693	18–29
48	February 3	L. A. Lakers	L 97–98	Greg Monroe (20)	Greg Monroe (12)	Will Bynum (10)	The Palace of Auburn Hills; 18,157	18–30
49	February 4	@ New York	L 85–99	José Calderón (15)	Greg Monroe (10)	Rodney Stuckey (4)	Madison Square Garden; 19,033	18–31
50	February 6	Brooklyn	L 90–93	Greg Monroe (23)	Greg Monroe (10)	José Calderón (9)	The Palace of Auburn Hills; 12,576	18–32
51	February 8	San Antonio	W 119–109	Greg Monroe (26)	Greg Monroe (16)	José Calderón (8)	The Palace of Auburn Hills; 16,267	19–32
52	February 9	@ Milwaukee	W 105–100	José Calderón (23)	Greg Monroe (13)	José Calderón (10)	BMO Harris Bradley Center; 15,511	20–32
53	February 11	New Orleans	L 86–105	Rodney Stuckey (19)	Greg Monroe (11)	José Calderón (9)	The Palace of Auburn Hills; 10,177	20–33
54	February 13	Washington	W 96–85	José Calderón (24)	Greg Monroe (18)	Will Bynum (8)	The Palace of Auburn Hills; 11,095	21–33
All-Star Break
55	February 19	Memphis	L 91–105	Knight & Jerebko (13)	Greg Monroe (6)	José Calderón (7)	The Palace of Auburn Hills; 13,481	21–34
56	February 20	@ Charlotte	W 105–99	Brandon Knight (21)	Charlie Villanueva (9)	Monroe & Bynum (7)	Time Warner Cable Arena; 13,112	22–34
57	February 22	@ Indiana	L 82–114	Will Bynum (17)	Viacheslav Kravtsov (10)	Will Bynum (4)	Bankers Life Fieldhouse; 17,750	22–35
58	February 23	Indiana	L 72–90	Will Bynum (15)	Greg Monroe (12)	José Calderón (5)	The Palace of Auburn Hills; 17,509	22–36
59	February 25	Atlanta	L 103–114	Rodney Stuckey (22)	Greg Monroe (8)	José Calderón (9)	The Palace of Auburn Hills; 12,407	22-37
60	February 27	@ Washington	W 96–95	Brandon Knight (32)	Greg Monroe (11)	José Calderón (18)	Verizon Center; 14,298	23–37

March : 1–13 (home: 0–5; road: 1–8)

Game	Date	Team	Score	High points	High rebounds	High assists	Location Attendance	Record
61	March 1	@ New Orleans	L 95–100	Greg Monroe (27)	Greg Monroe (10)	José Calderón (11)	New Orleans Arena; 14,189	23–38
62	March 3	@ San Antonio	L 75–114	Greg Monroe (16)	Charlie Villanueva (10)	Brandon Knight (6)	AT&T Center; 18,581	23–39
63	March 6	New York	L 77–87	Brandon Knight (17)	Jason Maxiell (9)	José Calderón (16)	The Palace of Auburn Hills; 16,181	23–40
64	March 8	Dallas	L 99–102	Brandon Knight (21)	Jason Maxiell (13)	José Calderón (7)	The Palace of Auburn Hills; 19,504	23–41
65	March 10	@ L. A. Clippers	L 97–129	José Calderón (18)	Jonas Jerebko (8)	Rodney Stuckey (5)	Staples Center; 19,344	23–42
66	March 11	@ Utah	L 90–103	Jonas Jerebko (15)	Greg Monroe (13)	José Calderón (7)	EnergySolutions Arena; 18,568	23–43
67	March 13	@ Golden State	L 97–105	Rodney Stuckey (22)	Jason Maxiell (14)	José Calderón (6)	Oracle Arena; 19,596	23–44
68	March 16	@ Portland	L 101–112	Rodney Stuckey (32)	Greg Monroe (9)	Greg Monroe (6)	Rose Garden; 20,161	23–45
69	March 18	Brooklyn	L 82–119	Will Bynum (18)	Greg Monroe (7)	Will Bynum (6)	The Palace of Auburn Hills; 16,072	23–46
70	March 22	@ Miami	L 89–103	Greg Monroe (23)	Greg Monroe (15)	José Calderón (7)	American Airlines Arena; 20,350	23–47
71	March 23	@ Charlotte	W 92–91	Charlie Villanueva (18)	Greg Monroe (9)	Greg Monroe (8)	Time Warner Cable Arena; 16,375	24–47
72	March 26	Minnesota	L 82–105	José Calderón (14)	Greg Monroe (12)	Charlie Villanueva (4)	The Palace of Auburn Hills; 16,877	24–48
73	March 29	Toronto	L 82–99	Jonas Jerebko (20)	Greg Monroe (13)	José Calderón (7)	The Palace of Auburn Hills; 19,322	24–49
74	March 31	@ Chicago	L 94–95	Rodney Stuckey (25)	Andre Drummond (14)	José Calderón (5)	United Center; 21,864	24–50

April : 5–3 (home: 3–0; road: 2–3)

Game	Date	Team	Score	High points	High rebounds	High assists	Location Attendance	Record
75	April 1	@ Toronto	W 108–98	Greg Monroe (24)	Jonas Jerebko (6)	José Calderón (9)	Air Canada Centre; 21,864	25–50
76	April 3	@ Boston	L 93–98	Greg Monroe (24)	Greg Monroe (17)	Charlie Villanueva (5)	TD Garden; 18,624	25–51
77	April 6	@ Minnesota	L 101–107	Brandon Knight (25)	Andre Drummond (10)	Brandon Knight (6)	Target Center; 15,311	25–52
78	April 7	Chicago	W 99–85	Brandon Knight (20)	Andre Drummond (10)	Greg Monroe (7)	The Palace of Auburn Hills; 19,577	26–52
79	April 10	@ Cleveland	W 111–104	Andre Drummond (29)	Andre Drummond (11)	Rodney Stuckey (7)	Quicken Loans Arena; 13,844	27–52
80	April 12	Charlotte	W 113–93	Jonas Jerebko (21)	Andre Drummond (9)	Will Bynum (10)	The Palace of Auburn Hills; 19,501	28–52
81	April 15	Philadelphia	W 109–101	Greg Monroe (27)	Greg Monroe (16)	Rodney Stuckey (6)	The Palace of Auburn Hills; 17,525	29–52
82	April 17	@ Brooklyn	L 99–103	Will Bynum (23)	Greg Monroe (12)	Brandon Knight (5)	Barclays Center; 16,868	29–53

2012–13 season schedule

=== Standings ===
Central Division	W	L	PCT	GB	Home	Road	Div	GP
y-Indiana Pacers	49	32	.605	–	30–11	19–21	13–3	81†
x-Chicago Bulls	45	37	.549	4.5	24–17	21–20	9–7	82
x-Milwaukee Bucks	38	44	.463	11.5	21–20	17–24	7–9	82
Detroit Pistons	29	53	.354	20.5	18–23	11–30	8–8	82
Cleveland Cavaliers	24	58	.293	25.5	14–27	10–31	3–13	82

Eastern Conference
#	Team	W	L	PCT	GB	GP
1	z-Miami Heat *	66	16	.805	–	82
2	y-New York Knicks *	54	28	.659	12.0	82
3	y-Indiana Pacers *	49	32	.605	16.5	81
4	x-Brooklyn Nets	49	33	.598	17.0	82
5	x-Chicago Bulls	45	37	.549	21.0	82
6	x-Atlanta Hawks	44	38	.537	22.0	82
7	x-Boston Celtics	41	40	.506	24.5	81
8	x-Milwaukee Bucks	38	44	.463	28.0	82
9	Philadelphia 76ers	34	48	.415	32.0	82
10	Toronto Raptors	34	48	.415	32.0	82
11	Washington Wizards	29	53	.354	37.0	82
12	Detroit Pistons	29	53	.354	37.0	82
13	Cleveland Cavaliers	24	58	.293	42.0	82
14	Charlotte Bobcats	21	61	.256	45.0	82
15	Orlando Magic	20	62	.244	46.0	82

== Player statistics ==
Legend
GP	Games played	GS	Games started	MPG	Minutes per game
FG%	Field-goal percentage	3P%	3-point field-goal percentage	FT%	Free-throw percentage
RPG	Rebounds per game	APG	Assists per game	SPG	Steals per game
BPG	Blocks per game	PPG	Points per game

=== Season ===
Player	GP	GS	MPG	FG%	3P%	FT%	RPG	APG	SPG	BPG	PPG
Greg Monroe	81	81	33.2	.486	.000	.689	9.6	3.5	1.3	.68	16.0
Brandon Knight	75	75	31.5	.407	.367	.733	3.3	4.0	.77	.11	13.3
José Calderón	28	28	31.7	.527	.520	.893	2.5	6.6	1.07	.07	11.6
Rodney Stuckey	76	24	28.6	.406	.302	.783	2.8	3.6	.67	.22	11.5
Will Bynum	65	0	18.8	.469	.316	.809	1.5	3.6	.69	.08	9.8
Kyle Singler	82	74	28.0	.428	.350	.806	4.0	0.9	.7	.45	8.8
Andre Drummond	66	10	20.7	.608	.500	.371	7.6	.5	.98	1.58	7.9
Jonas Jerebko	49	2	18.2	.449	.301	.773	3.8	.9	.78	.16	7.7
Jason Maxiell	72	71	24.8	.446	.000	.621	5.7	.8	.44	1.32	6.9
Charlie Villanueva	69	0	15.8	.377	.347	.551	3.5	.8	.45	.57	6.8
Khris Middleton	27	0	17.6	.440	.311	.844	1.9	1.0	.56	.15	6.1
Corey Maggette	18	0	14.3	.355	.238	.750	1.4	1.1	.33	.11	5.3
Viacheslav Kravtsov	25	0	9.0	.717	.000	.297	1.8	.4	.20	.36	3.1
Kim English	41	0	9.9	.375	.280	.724	.90	.6	.39	.07	2.9

== Transactions ==
=== Overview ===
Players Added

Via draft

- Andre Drummond
- Kim English
- Khris Middleton
- Kyle Singler

Via trade

- Corey Maggette
- José Calderón

Via free agency

- Vyacheslav Kravtsov
Players Lost

Via trade

- Ben Gordon
- Tayshaun Prince
- Austin Daye

Via free agency

- Vernon Macklin
- Walker Russell, Jr.
- Ben Wallace (retired)
- Damien Wilkins

=== Trades ===
June 26, 2012	To Detroit Pistons Corey Maggette	To Charlotte Bobcats Ben Gordon; Future first round pick
January 30, 2013	To Detroit Pistons José Calderón	To Memphis Grizzlies Tayshaun Prince; Austin Daye; Ed Davis; 2013 Second round pick (Toronto) To Toronto Raptors Rudy Gay; Hamed Haddadi

=== Free agents ===
Additions
Player	Date signed	Former team
Vyacheslav Kravtsov	July 14	BC Donetsk (Ukraine)

Subtractions
Player	Reason Left	New team
Damien Wilkins	Free Agency	Philadelphia 76ers
Walker Russell, Jr.	Free Agency	Oklahoma City Thunder
Vernon Macklin	Free Agency	Royal Halı Gaziantep (Turkey)
