= Luke Ridnour =

American basketball player (born 1981)

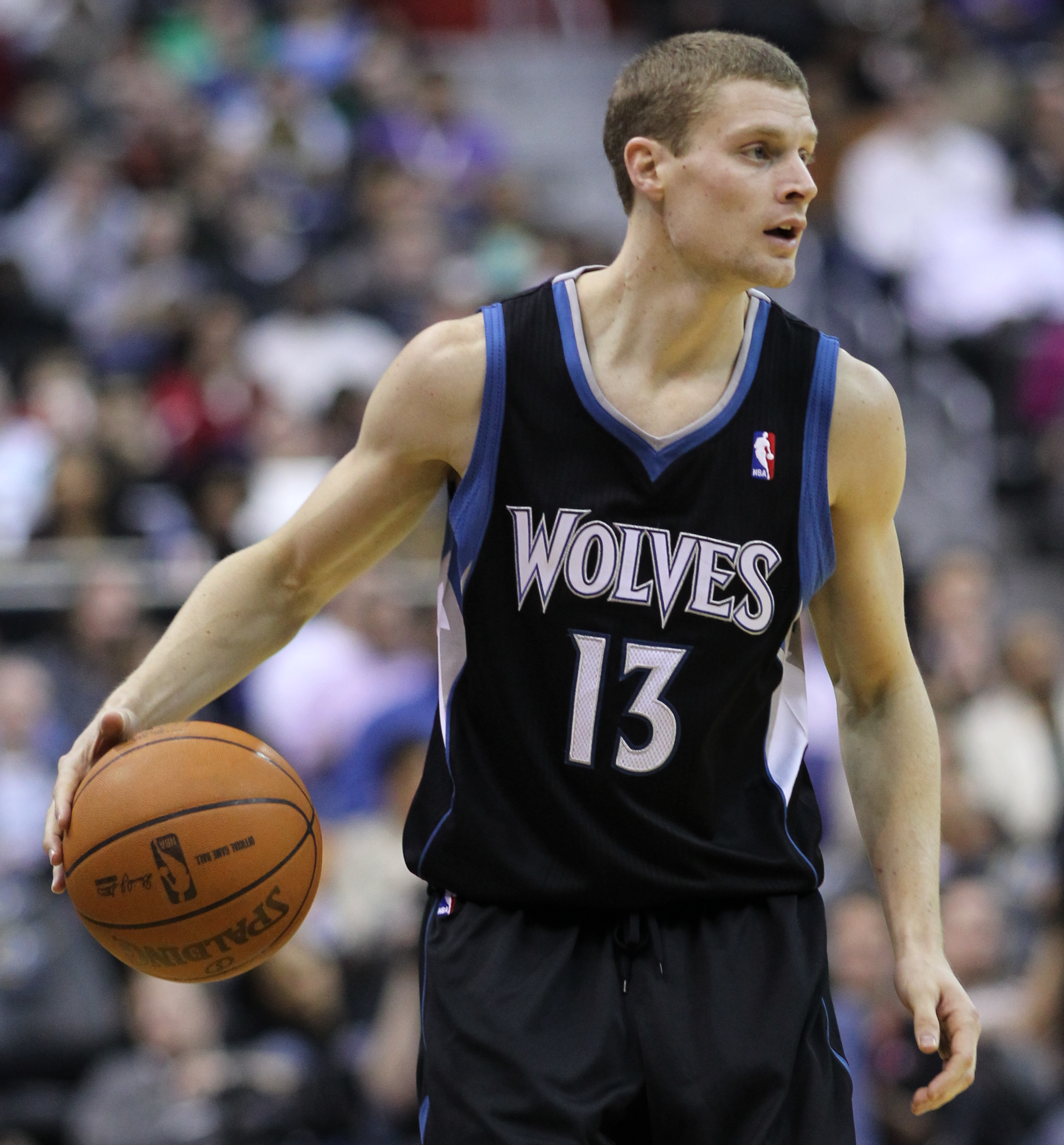
- Ridnour with the Minnesota Timberwolves in 2011

Personal information
- Born: February 13, 1981 (age 45) Coeur d'Alene, Idaho, U.S.
- Listed height: 6 ft 2 in (1.88 m)
- Listed weight: 175 lb (79 kg)

Career information
- High school: Blaine (Blaine, Washington)
- College: Oregon (2000–2003)
- NBA draft: 2003: 1st round, 14th overall pick
- Drafted by: Seattle SuperSonics
- Playing career: 2003–2015
- Position: Point guard / shooting guard
- Number: 8, 13

Career history
- 2003–2008: Seattle SuperSonics
- 2008–2010: Milwaukee Bucks
- 2010–2013: Minnesota Timberwolves
- 2013–2014: Milwaukee Bucks
- 2014: Charlotte Bobcats
- 2014–2015: Orlando Magic

Career highlights
- Third-team All-American – SN (2003); Pac-10 Player of the Year (2003); 2× First-team All-Pac-10 (2002, 2003); Pac-10 Freshman of the Year (2001); McDonald's All-American (2000); Fourth-team Parade All-American (2000); Washington Mr. Basketball (2000)

Career statistics
- Points: 7,740 (9.3 ppg)
- Rebounds: 1,877 (2.3 rpg)
- Assists: 3,713 (4.5 apg)
- Stats at NBA.com
- Stats at Basketball Reference

Lukas Robin Ridnour (born February 13, 1981) is an American former professional basketball player who played 12 seasons in the National Basketball Association (NBA). He played college basketball for the Oregon Ducks.

== Early life ==
Ridnour was born in Coeur d'Alene, Idaho, and grew up in Blaine, Washington. His father, Rob, was his basketball coach during high school. During his sophomore year, his father gave him the gym keys so he could practice during the day and late into the night. Subsequently, he was on two state title-winning teams at Blaine High School and was named a high school All-American by McDonald's and Parade in 2000, his graduation year.

== College career ==
Ridnour starred at the University of Oregon, where he teamed with Luke Jackson and Fred Jones to take the Ducks to the NCAA Division I men's basketball tournament twice, including the Elite 8 in 2002. He set the school season record for assists (218) and made a conference-record 62 consecutive free throws. Ridnour averaged 19.7 points per game and 6.6 assists per game. Ridnour left Oregon after his junior year, when he was Pac-10 Player of the Year.

== Professional career ==
=== Seattle SuperSonics (2003–2008) ===
Luke was picked 14th in the 2003 NBA draft by the Seattle SuperSonics. Ridnour played sparingly during his rookie season, but became the starting point guard for the Sonics in the 2004–05 season. He participated in the 2005 All-Star weekend, playing in the Rookie Challenge and Skills Challenge. During the 2005 NBA Playoffs, Ridnour and the Sonics reached the conference semifinals, where Ridnour averaged 10.8 points, 3.7 assists, and 3.3 rebounds as they were eliminated by the eventual champion San Antonio Spurs in a six-game series. On November 13, 2006, Ridnour scored a career-high 32 points, including four made free throws to seal the victory, while leading Seattle to a 119–113 win over the New Jersey Nets.

=== Milwaukee Bucks (2008–2010) ===
On August 13, 2008, Ridnour was involved in a three-team, six-player deal involving the Sonics (which had become the Oklahoma City Thunder), the Milwaukee Bucks, and the Cleveland Cavaliers, that sent Milwaukee's Mo Williams to Cleveland, Cleveland's Joe Smith and Milwaukee's Desmond Mason to Seattle, Cleveland's Damon Jones and Ridnour and Adrian Griffin to Milwaukee, which ended Ridnour's five-year run with the Sonics/Thunder. On January 22, 2010, Ridnour scored a season-high 27 points during a 101–96 loss to the Toronto Raptors.

=== Minnesota Timberwolves (2010–2013) ===
On July 21, 2010, Ridnour signed a four-year, $16 million contract with the Minnesota Timberwolves. On February 22, 2012, he scored a buzzer-beater with a floater against the Utah Jazz.

=== Return to Milwaukee (2013–2014) ===
On July 11, 2013, Ridnour was reacquired by the Bucks in a three-team transaction that brought Oklahoma City Thunder shooting guard Kevin Martin to the Minnesota Timberwolves.

=== Charlotte Bobcats (2014) ===
On February 20, 2014, Ridnour was traded to Charlotte along with Gary Neal in exchange for Ramon Sessions and Jeff Adrien.

=== Orlando Magic (2014–2015) ===
On July 25, 2014, Ridnour signed with the Orlando Magic. His final NBA game was played on April 1, 2015, in a 91–103 loss to the San Antonio Spurs, in which he recorded six points and one assist.

=== Retirement ===
In June 2015, Ridnour garnered national attention as he was traded four times in six days. On June 24, he was traded to the Memphis Grizzlies in exchange for the draft rights to Jānis Timma. On June 25, the Grizzlies sent him to the Charlotte Hornets in exchange for Matt Barnes; later that same day, he was traded with a 2016 second-round draft pick, to the Oklahoma City Thunder in exchange for Jeremy Lamb. Lastly, on June 30, Ridnour was traded to the Toronto Raptors along with cash considerations in exchange for the draft rights to Tomislav Zubčić. Ridnour later stated in an interview with USA Today that he found the whole situation rather "funny," as he and his family were at their home in Seattle while the moves were unfolding. On July 9, 2015, he was waived by the Raptors, adding to the list of teams he never visited during the two-week.

On September 21, 2015, Ridnour announced his decision to sit out the 2015–16 season. On June 22, 2016, Ridnour announced his retirement from professional basketball.

== NBA career statistics ==
Legend
GP	Games played	GS	Games started	MPG	Minutes per game
FG%	Field goal percentage	3P%	3-point field goal percentage	FT%	Free throw percentage
RPG	Rebounds per game	APG	Assists per game	SPG	Steals per game
BPG	Blocks per game	PPG	Points per game	**Bold**	Career high
*	Led the league

=== Regular season ===
Year	Team	GP	GS	MPG	FG%	3P%	FT%	RPG	APG	SPG	BPG	PPG
2003–04	Seattle	69	6	16.1	.414	.338	.823	1.6	2.4	.8	.1	5.5
2004–05	Seattle	**82**	**82***	31.4	.405	.376	.883	2.5	5.9	1.1	**.3**	10.0
2005–06	Seattle	79	77	**33.2**	.418	.289	.877	**3.0**	**7.0**	**1.6**	**.3**	11.5
2006–07	Seattle	71	58	29.5	.433	.353	.805	2.3	5.2	1.2	**.3**	11.0
2007–08	Seattle	61	5	20.0	.399	.296	.857	1.5	4.0	.6	.2	6.4
2008–09	Milwaukee	72	50	28.2	.403	.350	.869	**3.0**	5.1	1.3	.2	9.6
2009–10	Milwaukee	**82***	0	21.5	**.478**	.381	**.907**	1.7	4.0	.7	.1	10.4
2010–11	Minnesota	71	66	30.4	.468	**.440**	.883	2.8	5.4	1.3	.1	11.8
2011–12	Minnesota	53	53	33.0	.440	.322	.891	2.7	4.8	1.1	**.3**	**12.1**
2012–13	Minnesota	**82***	**82***	30.2	.453	.311	.848	2.5	3.8	1.0	.2	11.5
2013–14	Milwaukee	36	12	21.2	.384	.368	.684	1.7	3.4	.6	.1	5.7
2013–14	Charlotte	25	2	15.1	.389	.300	.571	1.4	2.2	.4	.2	4.0
2014–15	Orlando	47	0	14.5	.426	.317	.857	1.4	2.0	.4	.1	4.0
Career		830	493	26.1	.431	.349	.857	2.3	4.5	1.0	.2	9.3

=== Playoffs ===
Year	Team	GP	GS	MPG	FG%	3P%	FT%	RPG	APG	SPG	BPG	PPG
2005	Seattle	**11**	**11**	**34.4**	.393	.235	**.950**	**3.3**	**4.3**	**1.2**	**.7**	**9.7**
2010	Milwaukee	7	0	17.3	**.467**	**.357**	.833	1.9	1.9	.6	.1	8.1
2014	Charlotte	4	0	9.0	.308	.333	.000	1.0	3.0	.0	.3	2.5
Career		22	11	24.3	.406	.297	.906	2.4	3.3	.8	.5	7.9

== Personal life ==
Ridnour is a Christian. Ridnour has spoken about his faith saying, "Even though I now have more success, fame, and money than I ever dreamed, my relationship with God is the only thing that brings me true peace and satisfaction."

== See also ==
- List of National Basketball Association career free throw percentage leaders
