= Jeff Adrien =

American basketball player (born 1986)

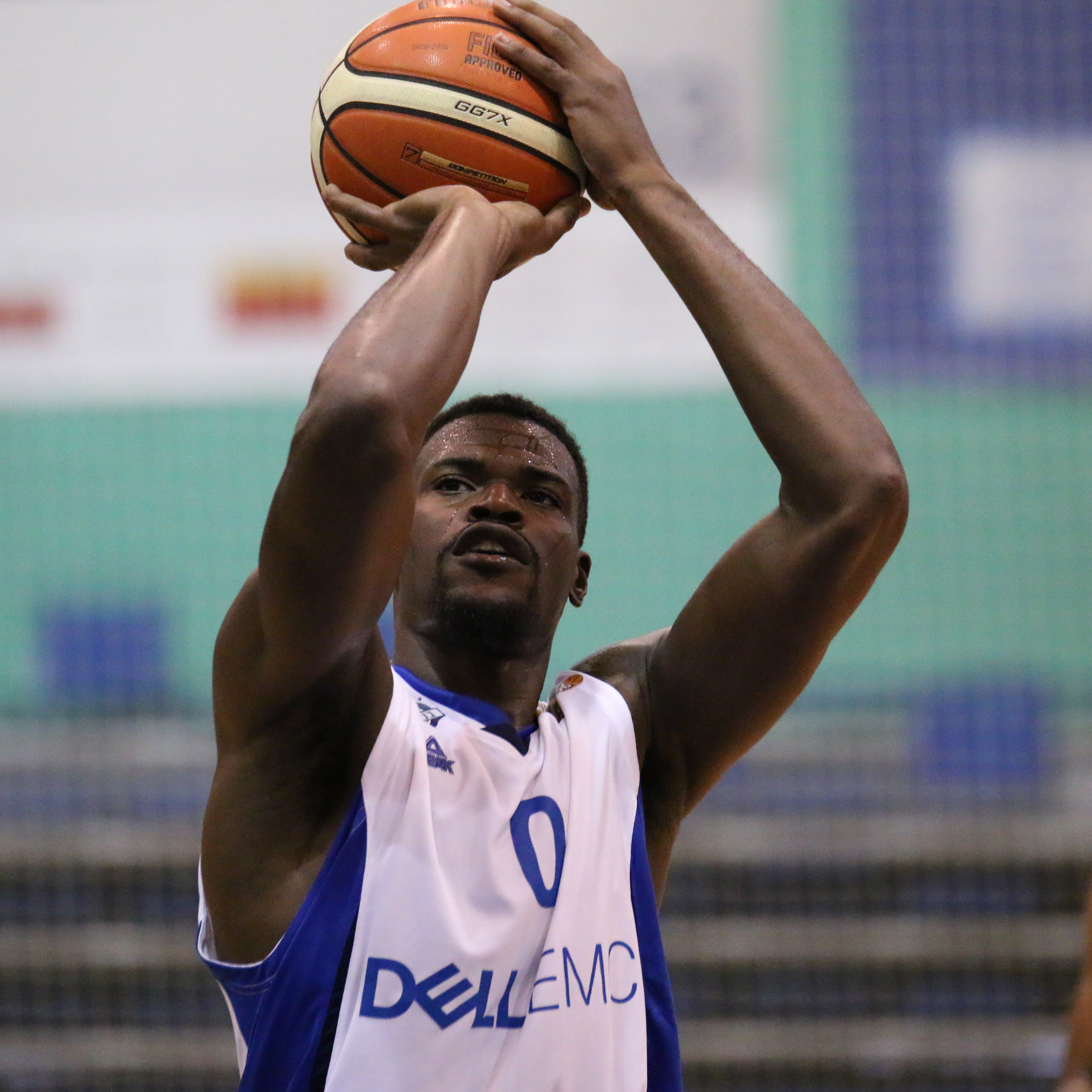
- Adrien with Bnei Herzliya in 2016

Free agent
- Position: Power forward / center

Personal information
- Born: February 10, 1986 (age 40) Brookline, Massachusetts, U.S.
- Listed height: 6 ft 7 in (2.01 m)
- Listed weight: 245 lb (111 kg)

Career information
- High school: Brookline (Brookline, Massachusetts); Brewster Academy (Wolfeboro, New Hampshire)
- College: UConn (2005–2009)
- NBA draft: 2009: undrafted
- Playing career: 2009–present

Career history
- 2009–2010: Leche Río Breogán
- 2010: Golden State Warriors
- 2010: Erie BayHawks
- 2010–2011: Rio Grande Valley Vipers
- 2011: Golden State Warriors
- 2011: Benetton Treviso
- 2011–2012: Houston Rockets
- 2012: Khimki
- 2012: Rio Grande Valley Vipers
- 2012–2014: Charlotte Bobcats
- 2014: Milwaukee Bucks
- 2014–2015: Minnesota Timberwolves
- 2015: Guangdong Southern Tigers
- 2016–2019: Bnei Herzliya
- 2019–2020: Ironi Nahariya
- 2020: Al-Ittihad Jeddah
- 2020: San Lorenzo de Almagro
- 2024: Piratas de Quebradillas

Career highlights
- 3× Israeli League All-Star (2017–2019); All-NBA D-League Second Team (2011); NBA D-League Impact Player of the Year (2011); 2× First-team All-Big East (2008, 2009); Second-team All-Big East (2007); Big East All-Freshman team (2006)
- Stats at NBA.com
- Stats at Basketball Reference

Jeff Adrien (born February 10, 1986) is an American professional basketball player.

Adrian played power forward at University of Connecticut Huskies where he was named to the 2008 first-team All-Big East Conference, team captain in the 2008–2009, and made it to the Final Four of the 2009 NCAA Division I Championship. Initially, he was not selected in the 2009 NBA draft but signed with Spanish league's Leite Río Breogán. Between 2010 and 2014, Adrien found playing time with the D-League Rio Grande Valley Vipers, the Houston Rockets, and the Minnesota Timberwolves, although he played for Itay's Benetton Treviso during 2011 NBA lockout. In 2015, he played briefly with the Guangdong Southern Tigers of the Chinese Basketball Association and three preseason games with the New Orleans Pelicans.

Adrien played in Italy from 2016 - 2020. First with Bnei Herzliya of the Israeli Premier League, where he received top honours and played in the 2016-2017 All-Star game. After Bnei Herzliya was relegated at the end of the 2018–2019 season, Adrien played for Ironi Nahariya for the 2019–20 season. Since 2024, he has played with the Quebradillas Pirates in Puerto Rican national premier league.

== High school career ==
Adrien was born and raised in Brookline, Massachusetts, and is of Haitian descent. He attended Brookline High School in Brookline. He rose to the varsity level as a sophomore on Brookline's state finalist team that year. As a senior, Adrien's team again reached the state championship.

After his graduation (2004), Adrien attended Brewster Academy in Wolfeboro for a postgraduate year, playing in the Amateur Athletic Union, before entering the University of Connecticut on a full scholarship.

== College career ==
Adrien played power forward for the University of Connecticut Huskies. In the 2007–2008 NCAA season, Adrien was named to the 2008 First Team All-Big East Conference, leading the team in points (14.8 ppg) and rebounds (9.7 rpg). As team captain in the 2008–2009 NCAA men's basketball season, Adrien averaged 13.7 ppg, and 10 rebounds per game, constituting a rare double-double average. In 2009, The Huskies made it to the Final Four of the 2009 NCAA Men's Division I Basketball Championship, before losing to the Michigan State Spartans. Adrien finished his college career with over 1,600 points and 1,100 rebounds.

As for style of play, Adrien said in an interview that he feels the best attributes that he brings to the game are his "leadership, rebounding, toughness, and the ability to score over taller guys". Adrien indeed demonstrated potential as a rebounder over taller players in the NBA pre-draft measurements; despite measuring shorter than average for a power forward for the NBA draft at 6'6.5" with shoes on, Adrien's wingspan measures an outstanding 7'2" and he weighed in at a formidable 236 lbs.

== Professional career ==
=== 2009–10 season ===
Adrien was not selected in the 2009 NBA draft but later signed with Spanish league's Leite Río Breogán in Lugo, Galicia. He averaged 12.5 points and 7.5 rebounds per game.

In 2009, Adrien accepted an invite to play on a team in the Orlando Pro Summer League. The team was run jointly by both the New Jersey Nets and the Philadelphia 76ers. He also played for the Memphis Grizzlies in the Vegas Summer League. On the Grizzlies team, playing alongside fellow Connecticut alumni Marcus Williams, Rudy Gay and Hasheem Thabeet, he led the team in rebounding.

=== 2010–11 season ===
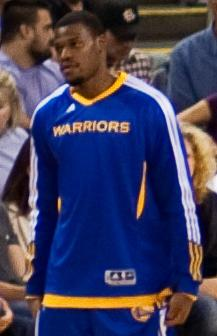
Adrien with the Warriors in 2010

Adrien played for the Orlando Magic in the Orlando Pro Summer League in 2010.

On August 24, 2010, Adrien was invited to the Golden State Warriors training camp. On October 10, 2010, he scored 11 points and grabbed 15 rebounds in 22 minutes in a preseason game against the Sacramento Kings. He made the Warriors' final roster, but was waived in December 2010 to make room for Acie Law.

On December 17, 2010, Adrien signed with the Erie BayHawks of the NBA D-League. He was traded to the Rio Grande Valley Vipers two weeks later for Garrett Temple.

On February 24, 2011, Adrien re-signed with the Golden State Warriors following a trade that allowed roster space for him. On June 30, 2011, he was waived.

=== 2011–12 season ===
In July 2011, Adrien signed a one-year contract with Benetton Treviso in Italy with an out clause to return to the NBA when the 2011 NBA lockout ended.

On December 21, 2011, Adrien signed with the Houston Rockets, where he was reunited with his former University of Connecticut teammate Hasheem Thabeet. He was waived on February 8, 2012.

=== 2012–13 season ===
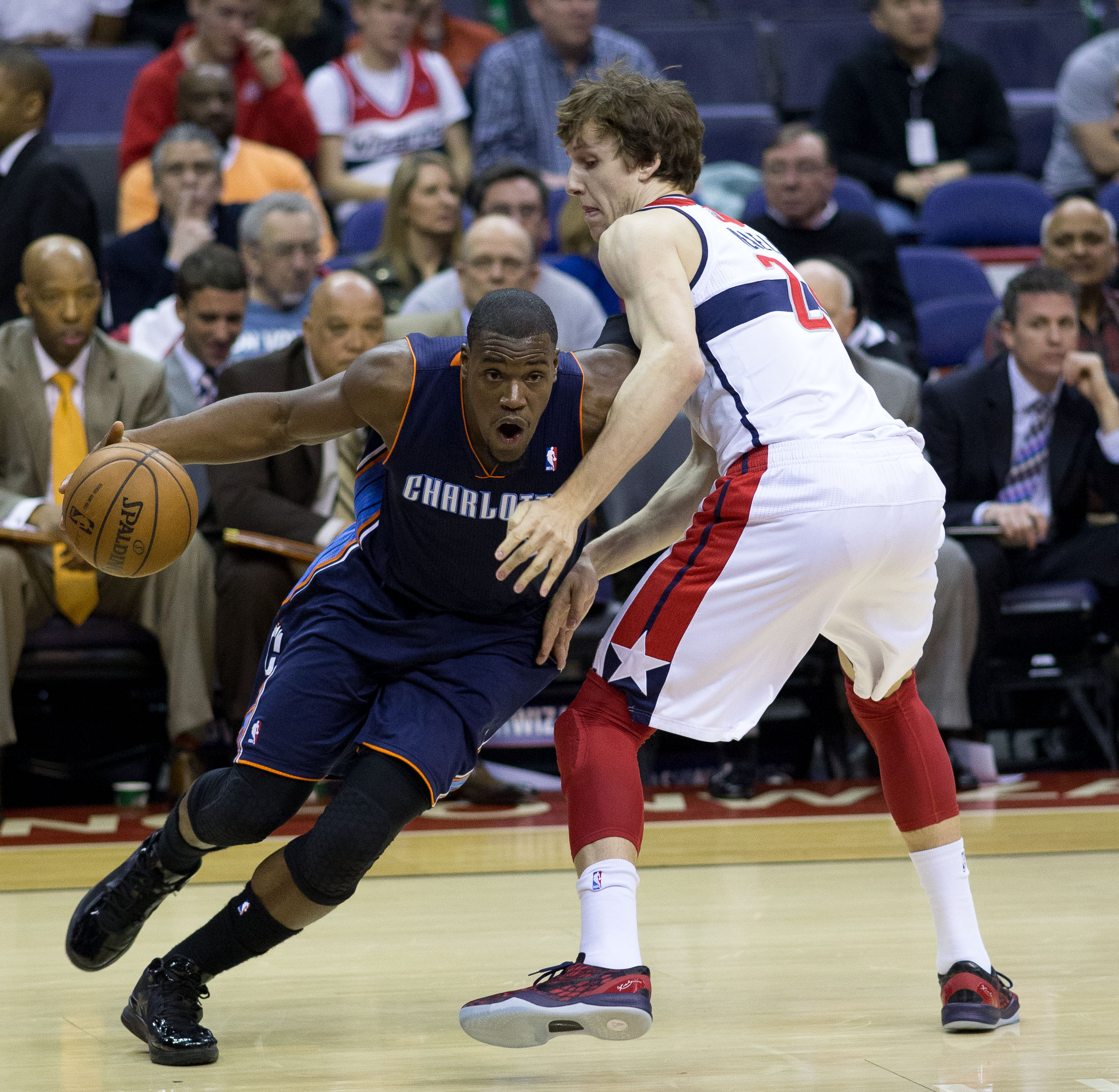
Adrien with the Bobcats in 2013

In October 2012, Adrien was acquired by the Rio Grande Valley Vipers.

On December 9, 2012, he was called up to play with the Charlotte Bobcats, where he was again reunited with a former University of Connecticut teammate in Kemba Walker. On January 8, 2013, the Bobcats guaranteed Adrien's contract for the remainder of the season.

=== 2013–14 season ===
On February 20, 2014, Adrien was traded to the Milwaukee Bucks along with Ramon Sessions in exchange for Gary Neal and Luke Ridnour.

=== 2014–15 season ===
On July 19, 2014, Adrien signed with the Houston Rockets, returning for a second stint. He was later waived by the Rockets on October 27, 2014.

On November 29, 2014, Adrien signed with the Minnesota Timberwolves to help the team deal with numerous injuries. Minnesota had to use an NBA hardship exemption in order to sign him as he made their roster stand at 16, one over the allowed limited of 15. On January 7, 2015, he was waived by the Timberwolves after appearing in 17 games.

On January 19, 2015, Adrien signed with the Guangdong Southern Tigers of the Chinese Basketball Association. Prior to Game 3 of Guangdong's semi-final match-up against the Beijing Ducks, Adrien was deactivated in order to open up a roster spot for Emmanuel Mudiay who returned from injury.

=== 2015–16 season ===
On September 23, 2015, Adrien signed with the New Orleans Pelicans. He was waived on October 24 after appearing in three preseason games.

=== 2016–17 season ===
On August 22, 2016, Adrien signed with Bnei Herzliya of the Israeli Premier League. During his season with the club, he was selected to the Israeli League All-Star game and helped the club reach the FIBA Europe Cup second round. However, despite a regular season with 76% home game victories, the team that ended the season at fifth place did not manage to win a play-off game.

=== 2017–18 season ===
On August 24, 2017, Adrien signed a two-year contract extension with Bnei Herzliya. On October 18, 2017, he recorded a double-double of 26 points and 15 rebounds, shooting 12-of-15 from the field, in a 93–74 win over Alba Fehérvár. He was subsequently named FIBA Europe Cup round 1 Top Performer. On March 29, 2018, Adrien was named Israeli League Player of the Month for games played in March. On April 8, 2018, Adrien recorded a career-high 31 points, shooting 10-of-17 from the field, along with 10 rebounds and 2 steals in an 86–78 win over Hapoel Jerusalem. Adrien finished his second season with Herzliya as the Israeli League fifth-leading scorer with 17.2 points per game, third in rebounds with 8.8 per game and third in efficiency rating with 21.2 per game.

=== 2018–19 season ===
On July 3, 2018, Adrien signed a three-year contract extension with Bnei Herzliya. On March 7, 2019, he recorded a season-high 25 points, shooting 9-of-14 from the field, along with 12 rebounds and four assists in an 89–90 loss to Hapoel Gilboa Galil. That season, Bnei Herzliya finished in last place and was relegated to the Israeli National League (the second-tier league in Israel).

=== 2019–20 season ===
On August 28, 2019, Adrien signed with Ironi Nahariya for the 2019–20 season. In 14 games played for Nahariya, he averaged 10.9 and 6.4 rebounds per game. On January 7, 2020, he parted ways with Nahariya.

On February 22, 2020, he signed with Al-Ittihad Jeddah of the Saudi Premier League.

== Personal life ==
Adrien is the son of Linette Adrien and he has a sister.

== NBA career statistics ==
Legend
GP	Games played	GS	Games started	MPG	Minutes per game
FG%	Field goal percentage	3P%	3-point field goal percentage	FT%	Free throw percentage
RPG	Rebounds per game	APG	Assists per game	SPG	Steals per game
BPG	Blocks per game	PPG	Points per game	**Bold**	Career high

=== Regular season ===
Year	Team	GP	GS	MPG	FG%	3P%	FT%	RPG	APG	SPG	BPG	PPG
2010–11	Golden State	23	0	8.5	.426	–	.579	2.5	.4	.2	.2	2.5
2011–12	Houston	8	0	7.9	.438	–	.583	2.8	.1	.0	.3	2.6
2012–13	Charlotte	**52**	5	13.7	.429	.000	.650	3.8	.7	.3	.5	4.0
2013–14	Charlotte	25	0	10.2	**.550**	–	.520	3.5	.3	.3	.6	2.3
2013–14	Milwaukee	28	**12**	**25.2**	.515	–	**.670**	**7.8**	**1.1**	**.6**	**.8**	**10.9**
2014–15	Minnesota	17	0	12.6	.432	–	.579	4.5	.9	.2	.5	3.5
Career		153	17	14.0	.474	.000	.628	4.3	.7	.3	.5	4.6
