= List of NBA career playoff games played leaders =

This is a list of National Basketball Association players by total career playoffs games played.

== Games played leaders ==
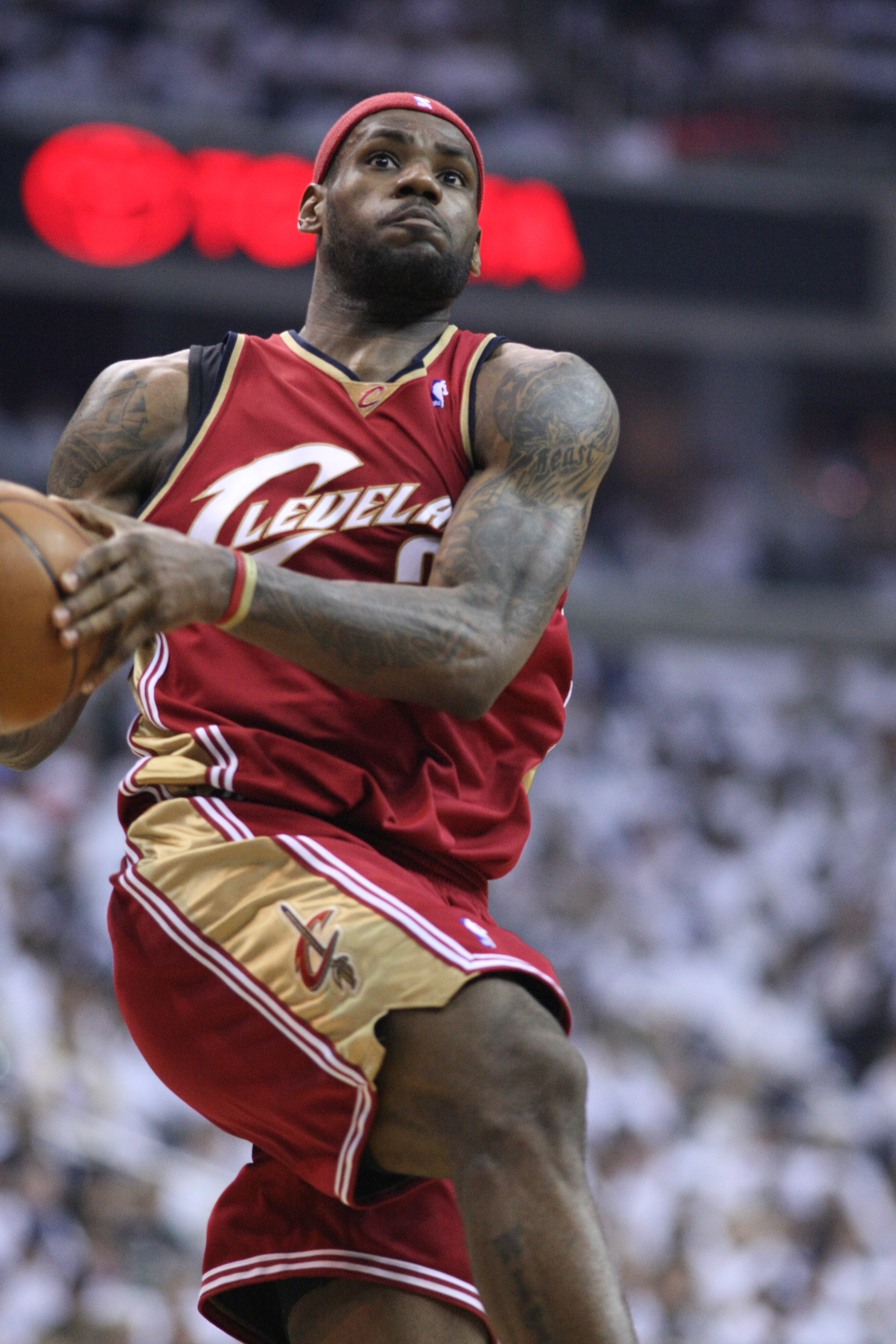
LeBron James has played the most games in NBA playoffs history.

^	Active NBA player
*	Inducted into the Naismith Memorial Basketball Hall of Fame
§	1st time eligible for Hall of Fame in 2026

Statistics accurate as of the 2026 NBA playoffs.

Rank	Player	Position(s)	Playoff team(s) played for (years)	Games played	Titles won
1	LeBron James^	SF	Cleveland Cavaliers (2006–2010, 2015–2018); Miami Heat (2011–2014); Los Angeles Lakers (2020–2021, 2023–2026)	302	4
2	Derek Fisher	PG	Los Angeles Lakers (1997–2004, 2008–2011); Utah Jazz (2007); Oklahoma City Thunder (2012–2014)	259	5
3	Tim Duncan*	PF/C	San Antonio Spurs (1998–1999, 2001–2016)	251	5
4	Robert Horry	PF/SF	Houston Rockets (1993–1996); Los Angeles Lakers (1997–2003); San Antonio Spurs (2004–2008)	244	7
5	Kareem Abdul-Jabbar*	C	Milwaukee Bucks (1969–1974); Los Angeles Lakers (1976–1989)	237	6
6	Tony Parker*	PG	San Antonio Spurs (2002–2018)	226	4
7	Kobe Bryant*	SG	Los Angeles Lakers (1997–2004, 2006–2012)	220	5
8	Manu Ginóbili*	SG	San Antonio Spurs (2003–2008, 2010–2018)	218	4
9	Shaquille O'Neal*	C	Orlando Magic (1994–1996); Los Angeles Lakers (1997–2004); Miami Heat (2005–2007); Phoenix Suns (2008); Cleveland Cavaliers (2010); Boston Celtics (2011)	216	4
10	Scottie Pippen*	SF	Chicago Bulls (1987–1998); Houston Rockets (1999); Portland Trail Blazers (2000–2003)	208	6
11	Al Horford^	C	Atlanta Hawks (2008–2013, 2015–2016); Boston Celtics (2017–2019, 2022–2025); Philadelphia 76ers (2020)	197	1
12	Danny Ainge	SG	Boston Celtics (1982–1988); Portland Trail Blazers (1991–1992); Phoenix Suns (1993–1995)	193	2
12	Karl Malone*	PF	Utah Jazz (1986–2003); Los Angeles Lakers (2004)	193	0
14	James Harden^	SG/PG	Oklahoma City Thunder (2010–2012); Houston Rockets (2013–2020); Brooklyn Nets (2021); Philadelphia 76ers (2022–2023); Los Angeles Clippers (2024–2025); Cleveland Cavaliers (2026)	191	0
15	Magic Johnson*	PG	Los Angeles Lakers (1980–1991, 1996)	190	5
16	Robert Parish*	C	Golden State Warriors (1977); Boston Celtics (1981–1993); Charlotte Hornets (1995); Chicago Bulls (1997)	184	4
17	Byron Scott	SG	Los Angeles Lakers (1984–1993, 1997); Indiana Pacers (1994–1995)	183	3
18	John Stockton*	PG	Utah Jazz (1985–2003)	182	0
19	Dennis Johnson*	PG	Seattle SuperSonics (1978–1980); Phoenix Suns (1981–1983); Boston Celtics (1984–1990)	180	3
20	Michael Jordan*	SG	Chicago Bulls (1985–1993, 1995–1998)	179	6
21	Andre Iguodala	SF	Philadelphia 76ers (2005, 2008–2009, 2011–2012); Denver Nuggets (2013); Golden State Warriors (2014–2019, 2022); Miami Heat (2020–2021)	177	4
21	Dwyane Wade*	SG	Miami Heat (2004–2007, 2009–2014, 2016, 2018); Chicago Bulls (2017)	177	3
21	Rasheed Wallace	PF	Portland Trail Blazers (1997–2003); Detroit Pistons (2004–2009); Boston Celtics (2010)	177	1
24	John Havlicek*	SF/SG	Boston Celtics (1963–1969, 1972–1977)	172	8
25	Ray Allen*	SG	Milwaukee Bucks (1999–2001); Seattle SuperSonics (2005); Boston Celtics (2008–2012); Miami Heat (2013–2014)	171	2
25	Kevin Durant^	SF/PF	Oklahoma City Thunder (2010–2014, 2016); Golden State Warriors (2017–2019); Brooklyn Nets (2021–2022); Phoenix Suns (2023–2024); Houston Rockets (2026)	171	2
Rank	Player	Position(s)	Playoff team(s) played for (years)	Games played	Titles won

== See also ==
- List of NBA career games played leaders
