= Derek Fisher =

American basketball player and coach (born 1974)

- Fisher with the Los Angeles Lakers in 2010

Personal information
- Born: August 9, 1974 (age 52) Little Rock, Arkansas, U.S.
- Listed height: 6 ft 1 in (1.85 m)
- Listed weight: 210 lb (95 kg)

Career information
- High school: Parkview Arts and Science Magnet (Little Rock, Arkansas)
- College: Little Rock (1992–1996)
- NBA draft: 1996: 1st round, 24th overall pick
- Drafted by: Los Angeles Lakers
- Playing career: 1996–2014
- Position: Point guard
- Number: 2, 4, 37, 6
- Coaching career: 2014–present

Career history

Playing
- 1996–2004: Los Angeles Lakers
- 2004–2006: Golden State Warriors
- 2006–2007: Utah Jazz
- 2007–2012: Los Angeles Lakers
- 2012: Oklahoma City Thunder
- 2012: Dallas Mavericks
- 2013–2014: Oklahoma City Thunder

Coaching
- 2014–2016: New York Knicks
- 2019–2022: Los Angeles Sparks

Career highlights
- As player: 5× NBA champion (2000–2002, 2009–2010); Sun Belt Player of the Year (1996); 2× All-Sun Belt (1995, 1996)

Career NBA statistics
- Points: 10,713 (8.3 ppg)
- Rebounds: 2,658 (2.1 rpg)
- Assists: 3,804 (3.0 apg)
- Stats at NBA.com
- Stats at Basketball Reference

Derek Lamar Fisher (born August 9, 1974) is an American professional basketball coach and former player. He played professionally in the National Basketball Association (NBA) for 18 seasons, spending the majority of his career with the Los Angeles Lakers, with whom Fisher won five NBA championships. He also played for the Golden State Warriors, Utah Jazz, Oklahoma City Thunder, and Dallas Mavericks. Fisher has also served as president of the National Basketball Players Association (NBPA).

Fisher played college basketball for the Arkansas–Little Rock Trojans, earning the Sun Belt Conference Player of the Year in 1996. Selected by the Lakers with the 24th pick in the 1996 NBA draft, he spent his first eight seasons with the franchise, winning three consecutive league championships (2000–2002) with teammates Kobe Bryant and Shaquille O'Neal and coach Phil Jackson. After the 2003–04 NBA season, Fisher signed as a free agent with the Golden State Warriors, later being traded to the Utah Jazz, whom he helped lead to the Western Conference finals. Due to his daughter's health, Fisher asked to be released from his contract in 2007. He rejoined the Lakers and won two more NBA titles with Bryant and Jackson.

In 2012, Fisher was traded to the Houston Rockets, where he bought out his contract and was waived at his request. Fisher then joined the Oklahoma City Thunder for the rest of the season, playing for the 2012 NBA championship in his eighth Finals appearance. After signing with the 2012–13 Dallas Mavericks Fisher played only nine games before being injured and asking to be released from his contract. Fisher later rejoined the Oklahoma City Thunder for another late-season push. He re-signed with them in the off-season and played in a team-high 81 regular-season games for the team in 2013–14. The following season, Fisher was hired as the head coach of the New York Knicks by Jackson, who had become the team's president. Fisher was fired in 2016 and has since been featured as a broadcast television analyst on Turner Sports' NBA programming. He also joined Spectrum SportsNet for the 2016–17 NBA season to work as an in-studio analyst for the Los Angeles Lakers. On January 19, 2017, Fisher was announced as one of the analysts for Turner Sports' new Players Only programming slate. He was the head coach of the Los Angeles Sparks of the Women's National Basketball Association (WNBA) from 2019 to 2022. On August 7, 2023, Fisher was hired as the head coach for Crespi Carmelite High School in Encino, California.

At the time of his retirement, Fisher was first in career postseason games played with 259, a record later broken by LeBron James.

== Early life ==
Derek Lamar Fisher was born on August 9, 1974, in Little Rock, Arkansas. He attended Parkview Arts and Science Magnet High School in Little Rock, where he was a letterman in basketball.

== College career ==
Fisher went on to attend the University of Arkansas at Little Rock (UALR) for four years, with a major in communications. He ended his collegiate career at Arkansas-Little Rock second on the school's all-time lists in points (1,393), assists (472), and steals (189). Fisher averaged 12.4 points, 4.4 rebounds and 4.2 assists over 112 games and led the team in assists and steals every year. He also set a school record for free throws made in a career (399) and ranked third among all-time UALR leaders in three-point field goals made (125). As a senior, Fisher earned Sunbelt Conference Player of the Year honors after averaging 14.5 points, 5.2 rebounds and 5.2 assists per game.

In 2005, Fisher pledged $700,000 to UALR towards the construction of its Jack Stephens Center auxiliary gym, since named in his honor, and the establishment of the Fisher Fellows Life Skills program, a mentoring series for UALR student-athletes.

== Professional career ==
=== Los Angeles Lakers (1996–2004) ===
Fisher was selected 24th overall in the 1996 NBA draft by the Los Angeles Lakers, and spent his first eight seasons with them. The Lakers also traded for rookie Kobe Bryant in this draft and the two rookies became great friends. Bryant went on to say that Fisher was his favorite teammate he ever played with.

Fisher made his NBA debut in an early-season game against the Phoenix Suns, tallying 12 points and five assists. Over the course of his rookie season, Fisher appeared in 80 games, averaging 3.9 points, 1.5 assists, and 1.2 rebounds. He was selected to the Schick Rookie Game during the All-Star Weekend in Cleveland and had 16 points and six assists. In the 1997–98 season, Fisher started 36 of 82 games, backing up Nick Van Exel. He started all 13 games in the playoffs and averaged 6 points per game as the Lakers advanced to the Western Conference finals before losing to the Utah Jazz in 4 games. In the lockout-shortened 1998–99 season, Fisher played in all 50 games and started in 21, mostly serving as a backup for veteran Derek Harper. Fisher would once again start in all of the Lakers' playoff games, posting averages of 9.8 points and 4.9 assists per game as the Lakers advanced past the Houston Rockets in the first round before falling to the San Antonio Spurs in the second round in four games.

Phil Jackson became the Lakers' head coach prior to the 1999–2000 season, and with him brought veteran point guard Ron Harper, who had started for three of Jackson's Chicago Bulls championship teams. Jackson historically preferred big guards. Being both smaller and playing more like a traditional point guard, and not being much of a shooter, Fisher worked hard on his shooting during the offseason to increase his value to the new coach. He started in 22 of 78 games for the season, backing up both Harper and Kobe Bryant when injured. The Lakers advanced to the NBA Finals and defeated the Indiana Pacers in six games to win the 2000 NBA championship, Fisher's first.

Due to a stress fracture in his right foot, Fisher missed the first 62 games of the 2000–01 season. During his absence, the Lakers were not winning as frequently as the previous season, which led to teammates Bryant and Shaquille O'Neal rekindling their feud over the team's offense. Assistant coach Bill Bertka, however, believed a key factor in the team's struggles was the team's defense without Fisher. Fisher returned on March 13, 2001, upgrading the Lakers' defense, and he started the final 20 games of the season, averaging 11.5 points per game. Harper had been the regular starter, but he was sidelined since February 13 with injuries to both knees. The Lakers finished the regular season with an eight-game winning streak, and ended with 56 wins. Fisher started all of the Lakers 16 playoff games as they swept through the Western Conference, averaging 13.4 points per game and shooting a team-best 51 percent from beyond the three-point line. This included a career-high 28 points on 6 for 7 three-point shooting in Game 4 of the Western Conference finals against the San Antonio Spurs. In the Finals, the Lakers defeated the Philadelphia 76ers in 5 games, bolstered by Fisher's 18 points on 6 of 8 shooting from three-point range in game 5 to help clinch the Lakers' second straight title.

Injuries limited Fisher to start in 35 of 70 games in the 2001–02 season, but he continued to average double-figure scoring and shot over 40 percent from three-point range for the season. Fisher started all 19 playoff games, averaging 10.2 points per game as the Lakers advanced to the finals following a grueling 7 games series against the Sacramento Kings. In the finals, they defeated the New Jersey Nets to win their third straight title.

By the 2002–03 season, Fisher had established himself as the Lakers' primary point guard, starting in all 82 games. However, the team was eliminated in the Western Conference semifinals by the eventual champion Spurs that spring, and this was followed by the signing of veteran point guard Gary Payton in the summer. As a result, Fisher was demoted back to the bench for the 2003–04 season. During NBA All-Star Weekend, he was a member of the Los Angeles team that won the Shooting Stars Competition.

==== The 0.4 shot ====
One of Fisher's finest playoff moments came on May 13, 2004, in Game 5 of the 2004 Western Conference semifinals between the Lakers and the defending champion San Antonio Spurs. The series was tied at 2 games apiece, and Game 5 was a closely contested affair. With 11 seconds remaining, Kobe Bryant hit a jump shot to put the Lakers up 72–71. Tim Duncan then made a fadeaway 18-footer over Shaquille O'Neal to give the Spurs a 73–72 lead with 0.4 seconds on the clock.

To devise strategies, three consecutive time-outs were called: the first by the Lakers, the second by San Antonio to set up the defense, and the last by the Lakers to re-set up the offense. When the game resumed, Gary Payton inbounded the ball to Fisher, who managed to catch, turn, and shoot the game-winning basket all in 0.4 seconds. Fisher sprinted off the court, as he later admitted he was uncertain he beat the buzzer and wanted to exit before the play could be reviewed. The Spurs immediately filed a dispute regarding the shot and after reviewing video footage of the play, the referees concluded that the ball indeed left Fisher's hands before the clock expired. The "0.4" shot counted and the Lakers won the game by a score of 74–73.

The Lakers closed out the Spurs in Game 6. They proceeded to defeat the Minnesota Timberwolves to clinch the Western Conference championship, but were upset in the NBA Finals by the Detroit Pistons.

=== Golden State Warriors (2004–2006) ===
On July 15, 2004, Fisher signed a six-year, $37 million contract with the Golden State Warriors. His two-season term with the team proved to be somewhat of a disappointment. While he was a reliable spot-up shooter, Fisher saw limited openings without a star player such as Bryant or O'Neal to command a double-team. The Warriors as a whole continued to struggle mightily and languished near the bottom of the Western Conference standings.

Speedy Claxton started more games than Fisher in the 2004–05 season, and then newly acquired point guard Baron Davis was a starter the following season. Despite this, in the 2005–06 season, Fisher averaged 13.3 points a game, the highest season scoring average of his career.

=== Utah Jazz (2006–2007) ===
Fisher was acquired by the Utah Jazz on July 12, 2006, in a trade that sent Keith McLeod, Andre Owens, and Devin Brown to the Golden State Warriors. He appeared in all 82 games of the 2006–07 season, averaging 10.1 points, 3.3 assists, and 1.01 steals while scoring in double figures 40 times in the 2006–07 season.

In November 2006, Fisher was voted President of the National Basketball Players Association, succeeding Antonio Davis. Fisher had previously served as vice president. He has also been the color commentator for the Los Angeles Sparks of the WNBA since July 1, 2008.

Several days before the Western Conference semifinals between the Jazz and the Golden State Warriors began, Fisher stated that one of his four children was ill, avoiding going into further detail other than to say he needed to be with his family and his playing status was uncertain.

Fisher had asked head coach Jerry Sloan to leave him on the active list for Game 2, but could not guarantee he would make it in time to play. But with permission from their doctors, he and his family flew from New York after his daughter's surgery and landed in Salt Lake City with the game in progress. When they landed, Fisher found out starting point guard Deron Williams was in foul trouble and his backup Dee Brown had been injured. The Jazz had been using Andrei Kirilenko as a point guard and desperately needed Fisher. Given a police escort, Fisher arrived at the arena, suited up, and was given a standing ovation as he walked onto the floor. Not even given a chance to sit down, Fisher was put in the game in the middle of the third quarter. Late in the fourth, Fisher made a key defensive stop on Baron Davis that helped send the game into overtime. In the closing minutes, the Jazz held a three-point lead when Deron Williams found an open Fisher for a three-pointer that sealed the victory. After the game, a tearful Fisher was interviewed, where he revealed the situation involving his then-11-month-old daughter, Tatum. She had been diagnosed with retinoblastoma, a degenerative and rare form of eye cancer, which required an emergency three-hour surgery and chemotherapy at a New York hospital.

The Jazz eventually defeated the Warriors in five games, but fell to the eventual champion San Antonio Spurs in the Western Conference finals in five games. Fisher's dramatic Game 2 entrance and performance against the Warriors was nominated for Best Moment in the 2007 ESPY Awards.

On July 2, 2007, Fisher asked the Jazz to release him from his contract so he could relocate to a team and city that would have the "right combination" of specialists that could help fight his daughter's retinoblastoma. The Jazz honored his request.

=== Return to the Lakers (2007–2012) ===
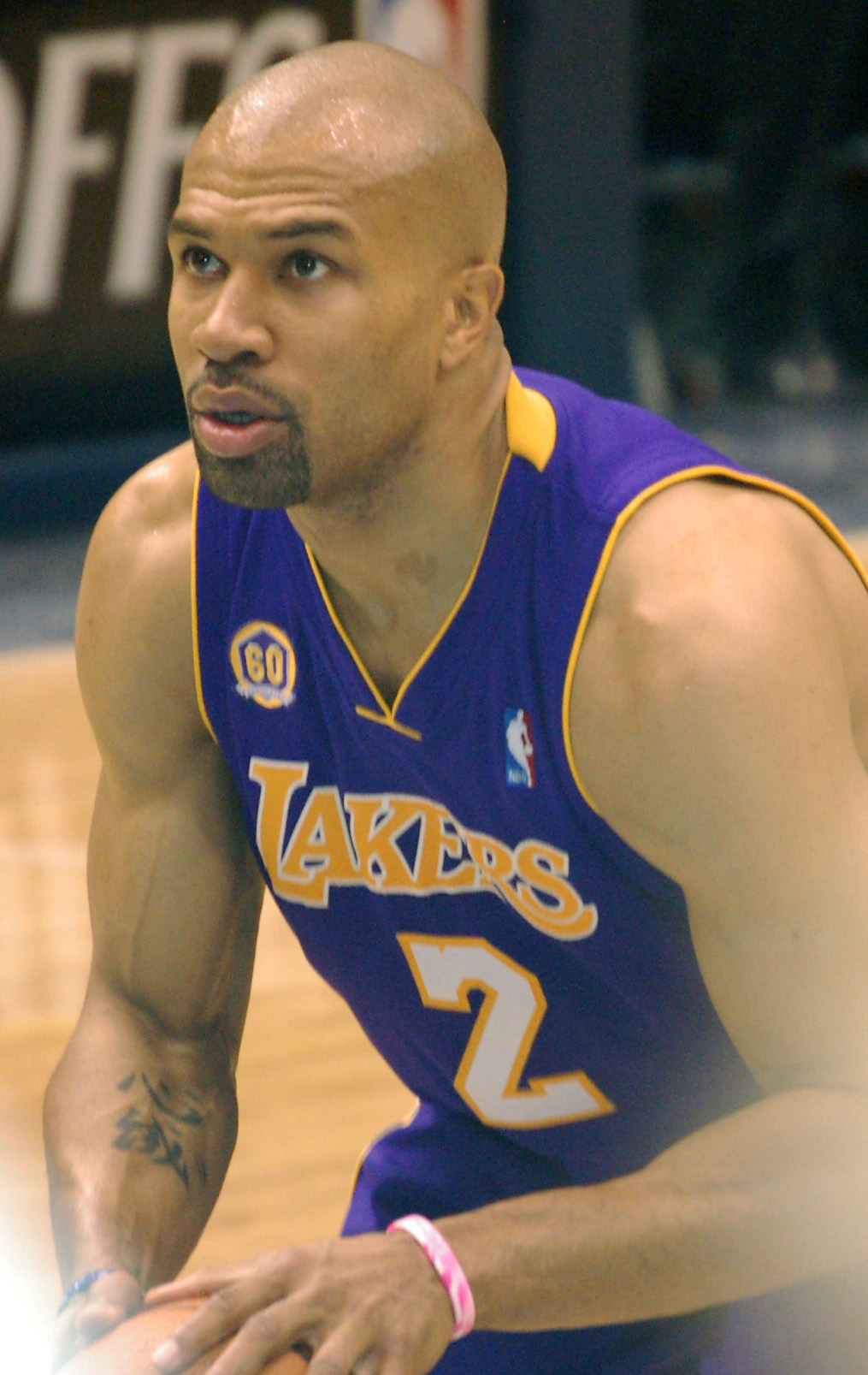
Fisher in 2008

After much speculation, on July 19, 2007, Fisher officially rejoined the Los Angeles Lakers by signing a three-year contract worth roughly $14 million. He had given up roughly $8 million over three years, as he was due about $22 million over the next three years in his prior contract with the Jazz. Jazz owner Larry Miller noted that "[i]t did look funny" that Fisher signed with the Lakers, but he did not believe Fisher or Lakers owner Jerry Buss would do anything underhanded. Jazz fans have taunted him, suspecting that he simply wanted to return to the Lakers.

When the 2007–08 season began, Fisher resumed his role as the Lakers' starting point guard. He contributed a solid season, shooting 40% from the three-point range and 88% from the free-throw line, the highest percentage of his career. He made a controversial defensive play in Game 4 of the Lakers-Spurs Western Conference finals, when late in the game Fisher jumped into Brent Barry's path without a foul called, causing Barry to miss a potential game-winning shot. The Lakers eventually ousted the Spurs 4–1, but lost the NBA Finals to Boston.

Throughout the 2009 NBA playoffs, Fisher faced criticism about his age and lackluster defensive performances against younger, quicker opposing point guards. However, Fisher helped the Lakers win Game 4 over the Orlando Magic in the 2009 NBA Finals, hitting a three-pointer over Jameer Nelson with 4.6 seconds remaining to send the game into overtime, and a tie-breaking three-pointer with 31.3 seconds remaining in overtime to help send the Lakers to a 3–1 series lead and soon after, the franchise's 15th NBA title. Bill Plaschke of the Los Angeles Times described these shots by stating, "After his two jaw-flooring three-pointers led the Lakers to a 99–91 overtime victory against the Orlando Magic in Game 4 of the NBA Finals, you'll now officially be seeing him forever." Fisher's 11.0 points per game, 50% shooting average, and 44% three-point percentage over the course of the Finals were an improvement over his regular-season numbers and a departure from his post-season struggles to that point. He had shot 23.5% from behind the three-point line and 35.6% from the field in the three prior playoff series. This was Fisher's fourth NBA championship.

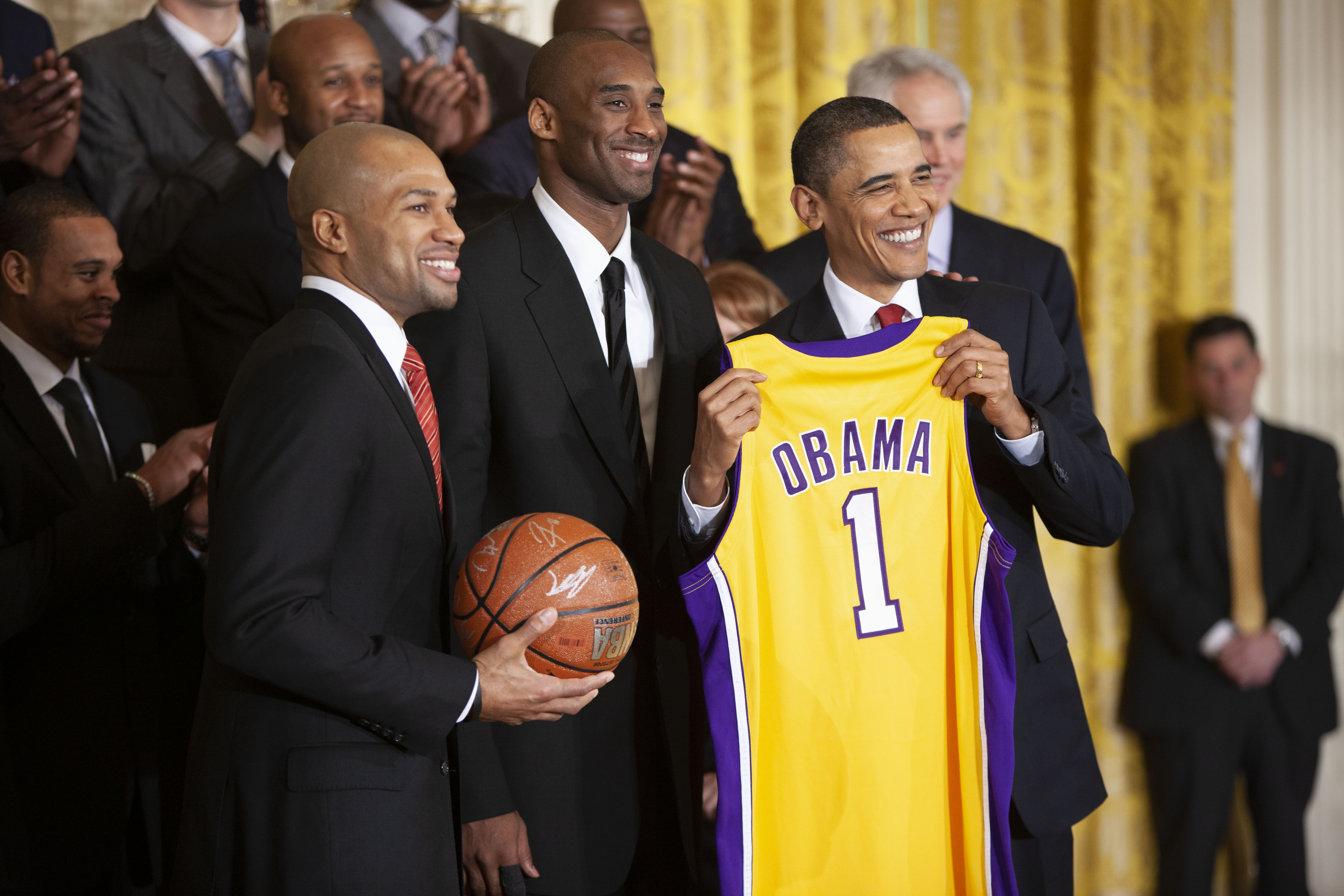
Fisher (left), Kobe Bryant (center) with President Barack Obama (right) in January 2010

On September 8, 2009, Fisher released a book, Character Driven: Life, Lessons, and Basketball. He is credited as the author of the book with Gary Brozek contributing. On February 3, 2010, Fisher made the 1,000th three-pointer of his career against the Charlotte Bobcats. Exactly a week later, Fisher played his 1,000th career game against his former team, the Utah Jazz, beating Kobe Bryant to the milestone by one game. On February 23, Fisher made the 9,000th point of his NBA career against the Memphis Grizzlies.

On June 8, 2010, in Game 3 of the NBA Finals against the Boston Celtics, Fisher played a pivotal role down the stretch to help the Lakers take a 2–1 series lead. In the fourth quarter, he scored 11 of his 16 points, including a three-point-play lay-up that helped the Lakers wrap up a 91–84 road victory. In Game 7, the Lakers came all the way back from a 13-point third-quarter deficit when Fisher hit a critical 3-pointer to tie the game with 6:11 remaining. The Lakers ultimately defeated the Celtics 83–79, and Fisher went on to win his fifth NBA championship.

After his fifth championship win, Fisher became a free agent, fielding offers from several teams, including the Miami Heat. However, on July 12, 2010, he agreed to a three-year, $10.5 million deal with a player option in the third year to continue with the Lakers. Though their contract offer was not the most lucrative, Fisher considered it "the most valuable" option.

=== Houston Rockets (2012) ===
On March 15, 2012, Fisher was traded along with a 2012 first-round draft pick to the Houston Rockets for Jordan Hill. The Lakers had decided to go younger, acquiring point guard Ramon Sessions earlier in the day. Four days later, Fisher was waived by the Rockets without ever playing for them after he negotiated a contract buyout. After clearing waivers, he was eligible to sign with any team except the Lakers.

=== Oklahoma City Thunder (2012) ===
On March 21, 2012, after clearing the waivers at 6:00 p.m. Eastern time, Fisher signed a contract with the Oklahoma City Thunder for the rest of the 2011–12 season. The Thunder organization called a pre-game press conference prior to its 7:00 p.m. game to formally announce the signing. He chose jersey number 37, his age at the time, because his usual No. 2 was taken by Thabo Sefolosha. Fisher made his debut on that night against the Los Angeles Clippers, scoring 5 points. The Thunder defeated the Spurs in the Western Conference finals and advanced to the 2012 NBA Finals, Fisher's eighth career appearance there. The Thunder would go on to lose the series in five games to the Miami Heat.

=== Dallas Mavericks (2012) ===
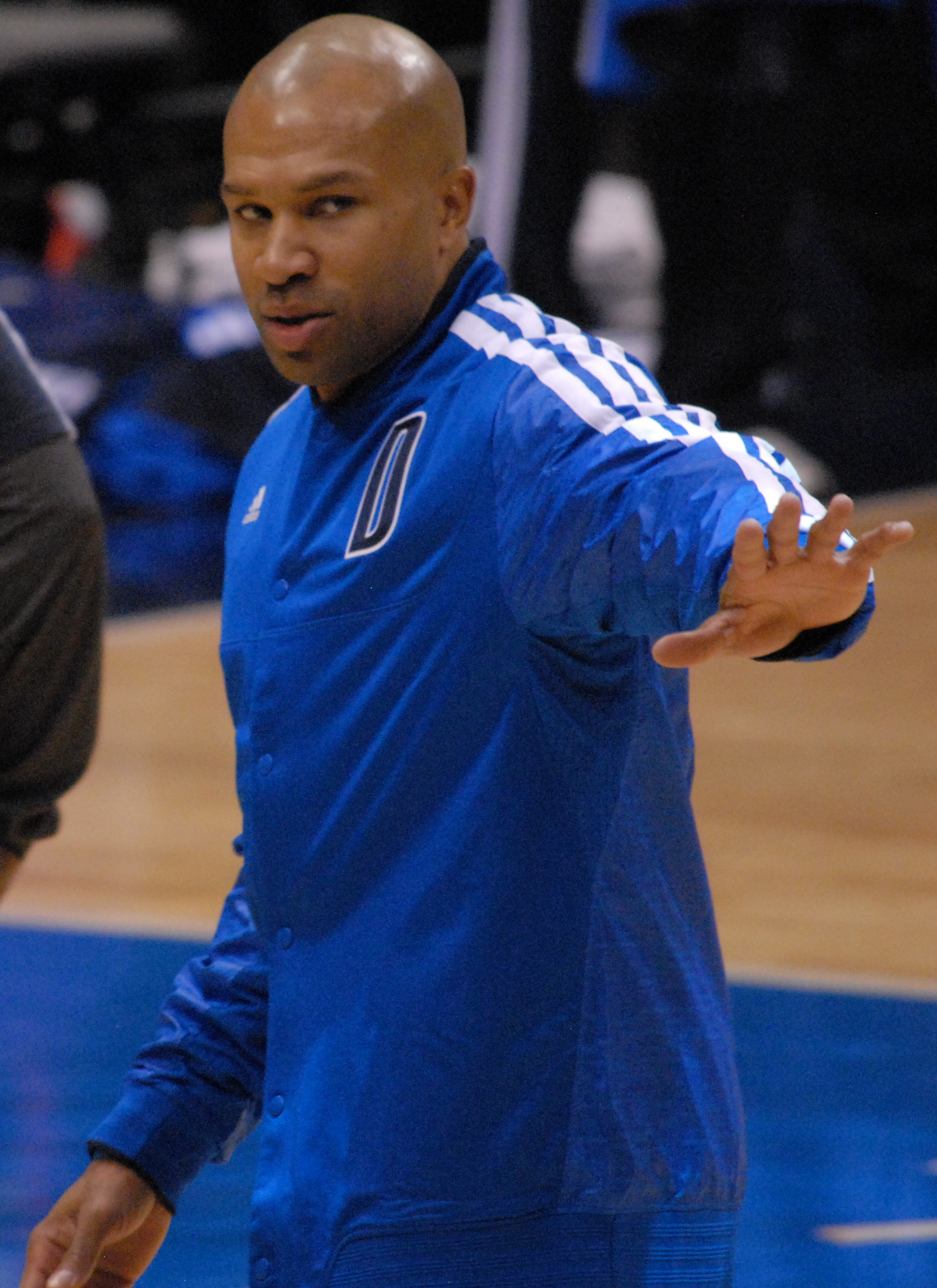
Fisher in 2012

On November 29, 2012, Fisher signed with the Dallas Mavericks. The team was in need of a point guard after a finger injury sidelined struggling starter Darren Collison. He wore No. 6, signifying his quest for a sixth championship, as his usual No. 2—last worn in Dallas by Jason Kidd—was unavailable. Fisher started in his first game with the Mavericks and Collison came off the bench in a 92–77 win over Detroit.

On December 20, Fisher injured the patellar tendon of his right knee, requiring an estimated two-week recovery time. Two days later, the Mavericks granted his request to be released. Fisher said the move was driven by the injury and a desire to be close to his family. In nine games with Dallas, the team went 5–4, and he averaged 8.6 points and 3.6 assists in just over 25 minutes per game.

=== Return to the Thunder (2013–2014) ===
On February 25, 2013, Fisher re-signed with Oklahoma City for the remainder of the 2012–13 season. He filled the Thunder's opening for a third point guard after Eric Maynor had been traded. After being away from basketball, Fisher reflected on his career and decided to pursue the opportunity with the Thunder. He did not contact Dallas before signing with the championship contenders, which upset Mavericks officials. Fisher chose to wear No. 6 with Oklahoma City after wearing No. 37 the previous season.

On July 24, 2013, Fisher re-signed with the Thunder for the 2013–14 season. He played in 81 regular-season games and all 19 playoff games, and was able to help the team reach the Western Conference finals before falling to the eventual champion San Antonio Spurs in six games.

== Coaching career ==
=== New York Knicks (2014–2016) ===
On June 10, 2014, Fisher was hired by the New York Knicks to be the team's head coach, signing a five-year, $25 million deal. He said that his relationship with Jackson, who had become the president of the Knicks, was a major factor in his decision to join the team. Fisher planned for the Knicks to run the triangle offense, which he learned while with the Lakers under Jackson. During the offseason, he helped the Knicks re-recruit and re-sign free agent Carmelo Anthony, whom Fisher believed could adapt to the new offense. On October 29, Fisher made his coaching debut where the team lost their 2014–15 season opener to the Chicago Bulls 104–80. The next day, Fisher won his first game as a head coach after the Knicks defeated the Cleveland Cavaliers 95–90. The Knicks ended the season with a 17–65 record, the worst in franchise history.

Bolstered by first-round draft pick Kristaps Porziņģis, New York began 2015–16 as playoff contenders with a 22–22 record. However, Fisher was fired on February 8, 2016, after the Knicks lost nine of their next 10 and fell to a 23–31 record. Over one-and-a-half seasons with the Knicks, he compiled an overall record of 40–96 (.294).

=== Los Angeles Sparks (2019–2022) ===
On December 5, 2018, Fisher was named the head coach of the Los Angeles Sparks of the WNBA. The team got its first win of the 2019 season on June 1, 2019, defeating the Connecticut Sun 77–70, giving Fisher his first win as a WNBA head coach. On September 4, Fisher became the ninth WNBA head coach to achieve 20 wins as a first year as a WNBA head coach, as the team defeat the Atlanta Dream 70–60. The team would finish 22–12 under Fisher's first season, making the WNBA playoffs as the third seed.

Under the playoff format, the team would bypass the first round and face off against the Seattle Storm in a single-elimination game, beating the Storm 92–69 to advance the WNBA semi-finals. In the third semifinal game against the Connecticut Sun, Fisher came up with a strategy that SB Nation called bizarre, benching his three starting stars, Candace Parker, Nneka Ogwumike, and Chelsea Gray, for the fourth quarter, after which the Sparks were eliminated.

In his second season with the Sparks, Fisher led the team to a 15–7 record in 22 games in a shortened WNBA season, making the WNBA playoffs as the third seed. The team would bypass the first round and face off against the Connecticut Sun in a single-elimination game, but the Sparks would be eliminated, losing 73–59.

On December 22, 2020, the Sparks appointed Fisher to be the general manager. in the 2021 WNBA draft he selected No. 7 pick: Jasmine Walker (F, Alabama) No. 10 pick: Stephanie Watts (G, North Carolina) No. 22 pick: Arella Guirantes (G, Rutgers) No. 28 pick: Ivana Raca (F, Wake Forest) No. 34 pick: Aina Ayuso (G, Spain)

On June 7, 2022, the Sparks and Fisher parted ways as head coach and general manager after the Sparks started the year off 5–7 after bringing in Liz Cambage. Fisher went 54–46 as head coach during his Sparks tenure. He was 1–4 in the playoffs.

=== Crespi Carmelite High School - Encino, California (2023) ===
On August 7, 2023, Crespi Carmelite High School in Encino, California announced that Fisher would be their new head basketball coach.

== Television analyst ==
Fisher made guest appearances on television broadcasts throughout his career, and he began working professionally as a broadcaster in the spring of 2016. Multiple times during the NBA season, Fisher appeared as an analyst on TNT's Inside the NBA, and NBA TV. At the start of the 2016–17 NBA season, Fisher joined Spectrum SportsNet as an in-studio analyst for the Los Angeles Lakers. At the beginning of the 2025–26 NBA season, Fisher joined NBC Sports as a game analyst for NBA on NBC.

== Player profile ==
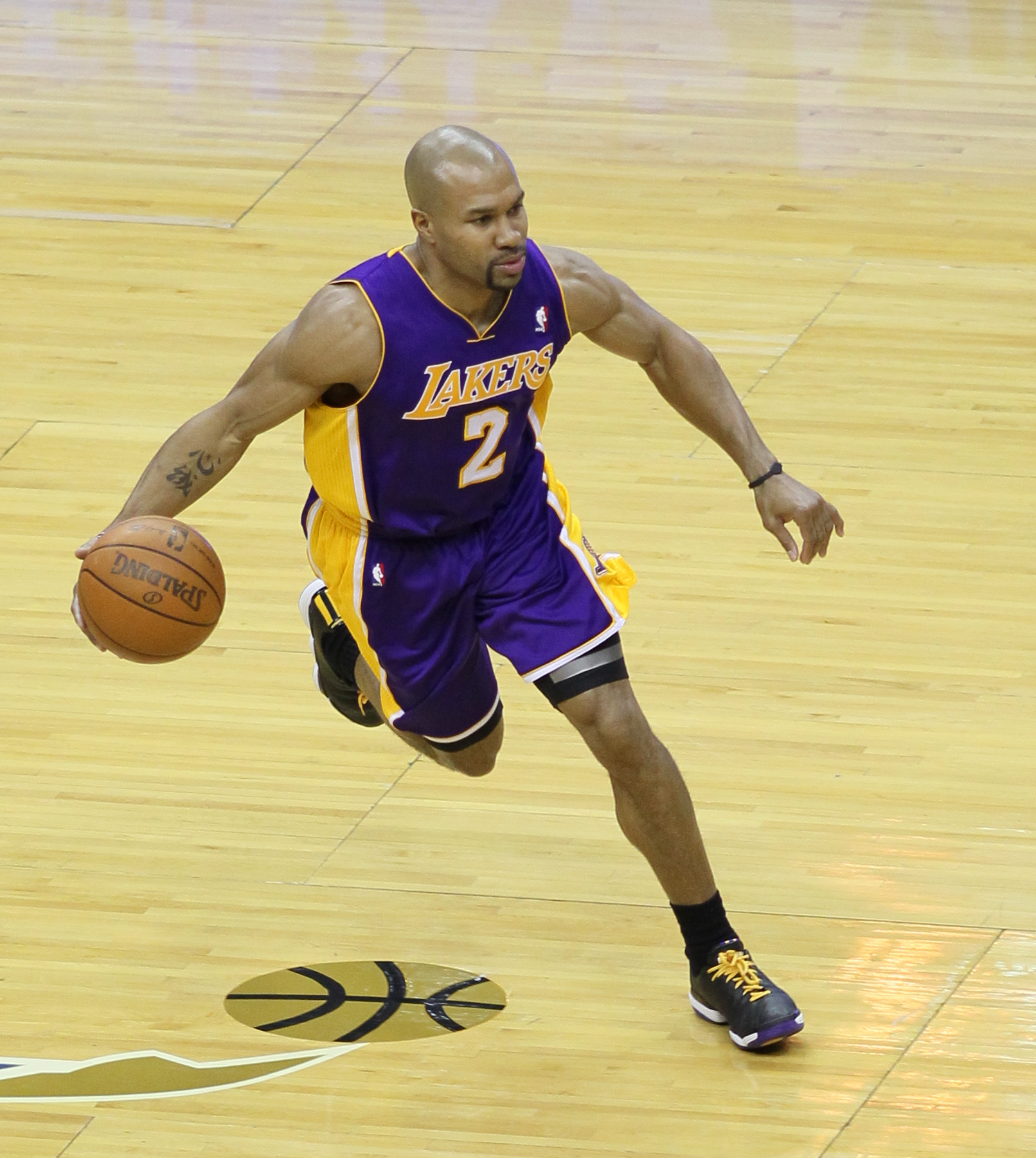
Fisher in a game with the Lakers

Fisher had a long and successful career in the NBA, especially with the Lakers. Fisher was perhaps best known for his leadership, toughness, and clutch playmaking ability. He averaged 8.3 points per game for his career and never topped more than 13.3 points during a regular season. However, Fisher did shoot at least 40% from the three-point line four times and 90% from the free-throw line three times in the regular season throughout his career.

At the time of his retirement as a player after the 2013–14 season, Fisher held NBA career playoff records for games played (259) and games won (161), both broken by LeBron James in 2020. Fisher also held the record for career playoff series won (40), surpassed by James in 2023. Fisher was also ranked third in career three-point field goals in the NBA Finals.

Phil Jackson said that Fisher was "definitely the spokesman for [the Lakers] as far as leadership goes", while Bryant called him his favorite teammate.

In a 2011 poll of NBA players by Sports Illustrated, Fisher received the fourth-most votes, six percent, for being the best flopper in the game. "Fish takes the contact. He does draw and sell offensive fouls," Jackson said. "We're happy he does what he does."

== Players union ==
Fisher was a player representative for the NBPA before becoming a member of the union's executive committee. He was elected the union's president in 2006. He supported the NBA's referees during their lockout in 2009. During the 2011 NBA lockout, Fisher took a more active role than his predecessors, and he shared the lead with Billy Hunter, the union's full-time executive director. Jason Whitlock of Foxsports.com wrote that Fisher was privately working with Stern on a deal to accept a lower percentage of revenues for the players and that Hunter confronted Fisher about the issue. In a letter to the players, Fisher called the reports questioning his loyalty "absurd" and demanded "a retraction for the libelous and defamatory stories" through his attorneys. Hunter said, "My relationship with Derek is very good. There was no confrontation."

Hunter later persuaded the union's executive committee to vote to request Fisher's resignation. Fisher did not resign and pushed for an outside investigation of the union. Hunter's leadership was criticized in the findings. During their annual meeting over the All-Star break in 2013, the union unanimously voted Hunter out as executive director. Fisher was re-elected as president; he was not on an NBA roster at the time, but remained eligible due to his stint earlier in the season with Dallas. Fisher's term as president expired in summer 2013.

In May 2013, Hunter sued Fisher and Jamie Wior, Fisher's publicist and business partner, seeking compensation and punitive damages. The suit claimed that Fisher had a secret deal with NBA owners during the lockout. In January 2014, a judge dismissed all of Hunter's claims against Wior and Fisher, and Hunter dropped his subsequent appeal in May.

== NBA career statistics ==
Legend
GP	Games played	GS	Games started	MPG	Minutes per game
FG%	Field goal percentage	3P%	3-point field goal percentage	FT%	Free throw percentage
RPG	Rebounds per game	APG	Assists per game	SPG	Steals per game
BPG	Blocks per game	PPG	Points per game	**Bold**	Career high
†	Won an NBA championship	*	Led the league

=== Regular season ===
Year	Team	GP	GS	MPG	FG%	3P%	FT%	RPG	APG	SPG	BPG	PPG
1996–97	L.A. Lakers	80	3	11.5	.397	.301	.658	1.2	1.5	.5	.1	3.9
1997–98	L.A. Lakers	**82***	36	21.5	.434	.383	.757	2.4	4.1	.9	.1	5.8
1998–99	L.A. Lakers	50*	21	22.6	.376	.392	.759	1.8	3.9	1.2	.0	5.9
1999–00†	L.A. Lakers	78	22	23.1	.346	.313	.724	1.8	2.8	1.0	.0	6.3
2000–01†	L.A. Lakers	20	20	**35.5**	.412	.397	.806	**3.0**	**4.4**	**2.0**	.1	11.5
2001–02†	L.A. Lakers	70	35	28.2	.411	.413	.847	2.1	2.6	.9	.1	11.2
2002–03	L.A. Lakers	**82**	**82***	34.5	**.437**	.401	.800	2.9	3.6	1.1	**.2**	10.5
2003–04	L.A. Lakers	**82**	3	21.6	.352	.291	.797	1.9	2.3	1.3	.0	7.1
2004–05	Golden State	74	32	30.0	.393	.371	.862	2.9	4.1	1.0	.1	11.9
2005–06	Golden State	**82***	36	31.6	.410	.397	.833	2.6	4.3	1.5	.1	**13.3**
2006–07	Utah	**82***	61	27.9	.382	.308	.853	1.8	3.3	1.0	.1	10.1
2007–08	L.A. Lakers	**82***	**82***	27.4	.436	.406	.883	2.1	2.9	1.0	.0	11.7
2008–09†	L.A. Lakers	**82***	**82***	29.8	.424	.397	.846	2.3	3.2	1.2	.1	9.9
2009–10†	L.A. Lakers	**82***	**82***	27.2	.380	.348	.856	2.1	2.5	1.1	.1	7.5
2010–11	L.A. Lakers	**82**	**82***	28.0	.389	.396	.806	1.9	2.7	1.2	.1	6.8
2011–12	L.A. Lakers	43	43	25.6	.383	.324	.830	2.1	3.3	.9	.1	5.9
2011–12	Oklahoma City	20	0	20.4	.343	.314	.929	1.4	1.4	.6	.1	4.9
2012–13	Dallas	9	9	25.4	.354	**.435**	.913	1.7	3.6	.6	**.2**	8.6
2012–13	Oklahoma City	24	0	14.4	.333	.351	**.933**	.9	.7	.6	.0	4.1
2013–14	Oklahoma City	81	0	17.6	.391	.384	.775	1.5	1.4	.9	.0	5.2
Career		1,287	731	25.4	.399	.374	.817	2.1	3.0	1.1	.1	8.3

=== Playoffs ===
Year	Team	GP	GS	MPG	FG%	3P%	FT%	RPG	APG	SPG	BPG	PPG
1997	L.A. Lakers	6	0	5.7	.273	.000	.667	.5	1.0	.2	.0	1.3
1998	L.A. Lakers	13	13	21.4	.397	.300	.621	1.9	3.8	1.3	.0	6.0
1999	L.A. Lakers	8	8	29.8	.418	.345	.800	3.6	**4.9**	1.0	.0	9.8
2000†	L.A. Lakers	21	0	15.3	.430	.414	.760	1.0	2.0	.5	.0	4.7
2001†	L.A. Lakers	16	16	**36.0**	.484	.515	.765	**3.8**	3.0	1.3	.1	**13.4**
2002†	L.A. Lakers	19	19	34.2	.357	.358	.786	3.3	2.7	1.0	.1	10.2
2003	L.A. Lakers	12	12	35.3	**.520**	**.617**	.818	3.0	1.8	1.5	.1	12.8
2004	L.A. Lakers	22	0	23.0	.405	.418	.657	2.5	2.2	.8	.0	7.5
2007	Utah	16	14	27.8	.405	.375	.933	1.6	2.6	1.0	.1	9.5
2008	L.A. Lakers	21	21	31.6	.452	.440	.836	2.2	2.5	**2.0**	.1	10.2
2009†	L.A. Lakers	22	22	28.9	.394	.284	.861	2.0	2.2	1.0	.0	8.0
2010†	L.A. Lakers	**23**	**23**	32.8	.448	.360	.821	2.5	2.8	1.2	.0	10.3
2011	L.A. Lakers	10	10	32.5	.433	.412	.810	2.7	2.6	1.4	**.2**	8.2
2012	Oklahoma City	20	0	22.3	.415	.375	**1.000**	1.6	1.3	.9	.1	6.3
2013	Oklahoma City	11	0	23.7	.457	.471	.667	1.5	.7	.6	.1	8.7
2014	Oklahoma City	19	0	15.7	.315	.293	**1.000**	1.7	.8	.7	.0	3.8
Career		259	158	26.5	.422	.399	.805	2.2	2.3	1.1	.1	8.3

== Head coaching record ==
Legend
Regular season	G	Games coached	W	Games won	L	Games lost	W–L %	Win–loss %
Playoffs	PG	Playoff games	PW	Playoff wins	PL	Playoff losses	PW–L %	Playoff win–loss %

=== NBA ===
Team	Year	G	W	L	W–L%	Finish	PG	PW	PL	PW–L%	Result
New York	2014–15	82	17	65	.207	5th in Atlantic	—	—	—	—	Missed playoffs
New York	2015–16	54	23	31	.426	(fired)	—	—	—	—	—
Career		136	40	96	.294						

=== WNBA ===
Team	Year	G	W	L	W–L%	Finish	PG	PW	PL	PW–L%	Result
LAS	2019	34	22	12	.647	1st in West	4	1	3	.250	Lost in Conference finals
LAS	2020	22	15	7	.682	3rd in West	1	0	1	.000	Lost in Second round
LAS	2021	32	12	20	.375	6th in West	-	-	-	–	Missed Playoffs
LAS	2022	12	5	7	.417	4th in West (at time of firing)	-	-	-	–	Fired after 12 Games
Career		100	54	46	.540		5	1	4	.200	

== Personal life ==
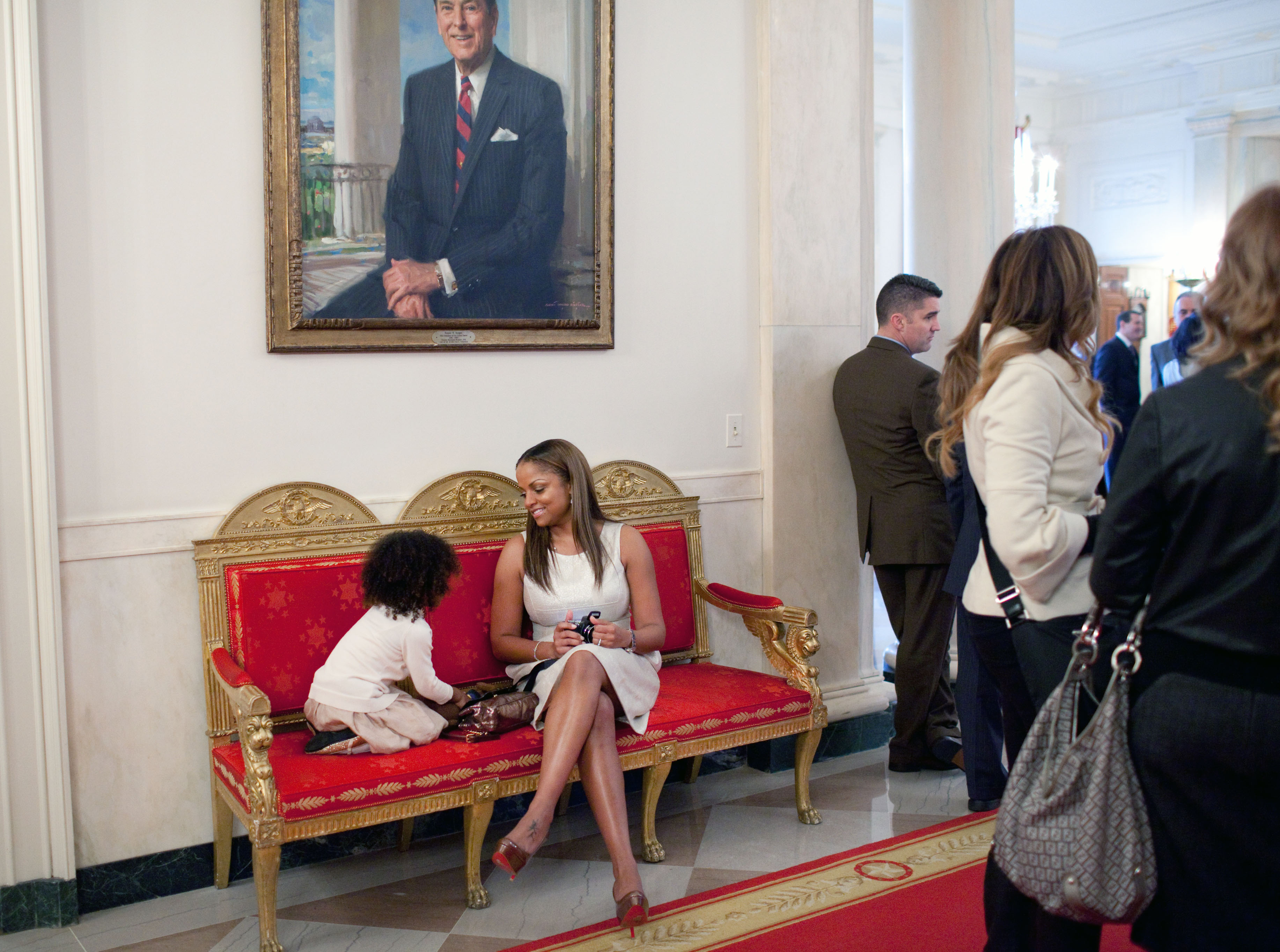
Candace and Tatum Fisher at the White House in 2010

Fisher is the younger brother of former NBA player Duane Washington, who is ten years Fisher's senior. Fisher is a Christian who has spoken about his faith and the ability he believes it gives him to play basketball. Fisher's nickname is D-Fish.

He married his wife, Candace, on February 19, 2005, and has four children: Tatum and Drew (twins), Chloe (Derek's daughter from a previous relationship) and Marshall (Candance's son from a previous relationship). On March 18, 2015, Fisher filed for divorce, citing irreconcilable differences; the divorce was finalized in May 2016.

He is currently the head basketball coach at Crespi Carmelite High School in Encino, CA.

In 2009, Fisher had a temporary restraining order placed on a 40-year-old female stalker who had been victimizing him since 2001. She had insisted she and Fisher were married, and had even changed her surname to match his. He had the order extended by three years, expiring in May 2012.

Fisher competed on season 25 of Dancing with the Stars, partnered with professional dancer Sharna Burgess. They were the third couple to be eliminated.

In October 2015, Fisher was involved in a physical altercation with former teammate Matt Barnes at a party in the home of Barnes' ex-wife, Gloria Govan. Fisher and Govan became engaged in April 2018 and they married on July 17, 2021, at Cielo Farms in Malibu, California.

Fisher was arrested on suspicion of DUI on June 4, 2017, after a car crash in Los Angeles in which his vehicle overturned. Govan, who was a passenger, was uninjured. He later pleaded no contest in the case.

== See also ==
- List of NBA career games played leaders
- List of NBA career playoff games played leaders
- List of NBA career playoff steals leaders
- List of NBA career playoff 3-point scoring leaders
- List of NBA career playoff games played leaders
