= 2008 NBA playoffs =

Basketball competition

Tournament details
- Dates: April 19–June 17, 2008
- Season: 2007–08
- Teams: 16

Final positions
- Champions: Boston Celtics (17th title)
- Runners-up: Los Angeles Lakers
- Semifinalists: Detroit Pistons; San Antonio Spurs

Tournament statistics
- Scoring leader(s): Kobe Bryant (Lakers) (30.1 PPG)

Awards
- MVP: Paul Pierce (Celtics)

The 2008 NBA playoffs was the postseason tournament of the National Basketball Association's 2007–08 season. The tournament concluded with the Eastern Conference champion Boston Celtics defeating the Western Conference champion Los Angeles Lakers 4 games to 2 in the NBA Finals. Paul Pierce was named NBA Finals MVP.

The San Antonio Spurs were the defending champions, but lost to the Lakers in the Western Conference finals.

== Overview ==
Thanks to preseason trades for Kevin Garnett and Ray Allen, the Boston Celtics entered the playoffs with an NBA best 66–16 record. It was also their first playoff appearance since 2005.

The Los Angeles Lakers entered their third consecutive postseason. Thanks to a midseason trade for Pau Gasol, they entered the playoffs as the top seed in the west for the first time since 2000.

The Phoenix Suns entered their fourth consecutive postseason. However, they lost to the defending champion San Antonio Spurs in the first round.

The Atlanta Hawks made the playoffs for the first time since 1999, taking the top seed and eventual champion Boston Celtics to seven games before bowing out.

The New Orleans Hornets made the playoffs for the first time since 2004 and for the first time as a member of the Western Conference. This was notable since this marks the playoff debut of Chris Paul and the Hornets’ first postseason appearance after Hurricane Katrina, pushing the defending champions San Antonio Spurs to seven games in the Conference Semifinals before bowing out. The Hornets would not win another playoff series until 2018, in which they were now known today as the Pelicans. To date, 2008 was the closest the New Orleans franchise had ever come from reaching the Conference Finals; as of 2024 the Pelicans and the Charlotte Hornets are the only active teams to never advance to the Conference Finals.

The Golden State Warriors won 48 games, more than 5 of the 8 playoff teams in the Eastern Conference. However, all eight qualifiers in the Western Conference finished with at least 50 wins, thus leaving the Warriors out of the postseason.

The New Jersey Nets missed the playoffs for the first time since 2001, largely due to a trade that sent Jason Kidd to the Dallas Mavericks. The Miami Heat missed the playoffs for the first time since 2003, thanks to a league worst 15–67 record. It also marked the first NBA postseason since 2003 not to feature Dwyane Wade. The Chicago Bulls also missed the playoffs for the first time since 2004.

With their first round series victory over the Toronto Raptors, the Orlando Magic won their first playoff series since 1996. However, they lost to the Detroit Pistons in the Conference Semifinals.

With their first round sweep of the Denver Nuggets, the Los Angeles Lakers won their first playoff series since 2004 (when they last made the NBA Finals). It also marked the only sweep of the 2008 playoffs.

With their conference semifinals win over the Orlando Magic, the Detroit Pistons entered their sixth consecutive conference finals. The Pistons also became the first team since the Showtime Lakers to accomplish this feat. As of 2025, this remains The Pistons’ most recent series win.

Game 7 of the conference semifinals between the Boston Celtics and Cleveland Cavaliers became notable for a duel between Paul Pierce and LeBron James, who scored 41 and 45 points, respectively. The Celtics won this game and advanced to the conference finals.

With their conference finals win over the defending champion San Antonio Spurs, the Los Angeles Lakers returned to the NBA Finals for the first time since 2004. They also became the first top seed since 2003 to make the NBA Finals.

With their conference finals win over the Detroit Pistons, the Boston Celtics made the NBA Finals for the first time since 1987. Game 4 of the Conference Finals was the Pistons’ last playoff win until 2025.

For the first time since 2000, the top seeds from each Conference met in the NBA Finals. The 2008 Finals was also the first since 1998 to feature neither Shaquille O'Neal nor Tim Duncan.

The Boston Celtics played 26 playoff games (2 games short of a full-length postseason of 28), breaking the 25 game record of the 1994 Knicks and 2005 Pistons by 1 game for the most playoff games in a single season played by 1 NBA team. The Knicks, however, only played a Best–of–5 First Round, and so had 2 fewer games to accomplish that feat.

== Playoff qualifying ==
=== Eastern Conference ===
The following teams clinched a playoff berth in the East:

1. Boston Celtics (66–16, clinched Atlantic Division, and home court advantage throughout the playoffs)
2. Detroit Pistons (59–23, clinched Central Division title)
3. Orlando Magic (52–30, clinched Southeast Division title)
4. Cleveland Cavaliers (45–37)
5. Washington Wizards (43–39)
6. Toronto Raptors (41–41)
7. Philadelphia 76ers (40–42)
8. Atlanta Hawks (37–45)

=== Western Conference ===
The following teams clinched a playoff berth in the West:

1. Los Angeles Lakers (57–25, clinched Pacific Division title, and home-court advantage throughout the Western Conference playoffs)
2. New Orleans Hornets (56–26, clinched Southwest Division title, 34–18 record vs. Western Conference)
3. San Antonio Spurs (56–26, 33–19 record vs. Western Conference)
4. Utah Jazz (54–28, clinched Northwest Division title)
5. Houston Rockets (55–27, 2–2 head-to-head vs. PHO, 33–19 record vs. Western Conference)
6. Phoenix Suns (55–27, 2–2 head-to-head vs. HOU, 31–21 record vs. Western Conference)
7. Dallas Mavericks (51–31)
8. Denver Nuggets (50–32)

== Bracket ==
This was the outlook for the 2008 NBA Playoffs. Teams in italics had home court advantage. Teams in bold advanced to the next round. Numbers to the left of each team indicate the team's original seeding in their respective conferences. Numbers to the right of each team indicate the number of games the team won in that round. The division champions possess an asterisk (*).

First Round	Conference Semifinals
**E1**	**Boston***	**4**
E8	Atlanta	3
**E1**	**Boston***	**4**
E4	Cleveland	3
**E4**	**Cleveland**	**4**
E5	Washington	2
**Eastern Conference**
**E3**	**Orlando***	**4**
E6	Toronto	1
E3	Orlando*	1
**E2**	**Detroit***	**4**
**E2**	**Detroit***	**4**
E7	Philadelphia	2
**W1**	**LA Lakers***	**4**
W8	Denver	0
**W1**	**LA Lakers***	**4**
W4	Utah*	2
**W4**	**Utah***	**4**
W5	Houston	2
**Western Conference**
**W3**	**San Antonio**	**4**
W6	Phoenix	1
**W3**	**San Antonio**	**4**
W2	New Orleans*	3
**W2**	**New Orleans***	**4**
W7	Dallas	1

Conference Finals
**E1**	**Boston***	**4**
E2	Detroit*	2
**W1**	**LA Lakers***	**4**
W3	San Antonio	1

NBA Finals
**E1**	**Boston***	**4**
W1	LA Lakers*	2

- * Division winner
- **Bold** Series winner
- Italic Team with home-court advantage

== First round ==
=== Eastern Conference first round ===
==== (1) Boston Celtics vs. (8) Atlanta Hawks ====
TNT

April 20
8:30 pm (ET)

Recap

Atlanta Hawks 81, Boston Celtics 104
Scoring by quarter: 21–29, 19–20, 15–24, 26–31
Pts: Al Horford 20; Rebs: Al Horford 10; Asts: Joe Johnson 7	Pts: Ray Allen 18; Rebs: Kevin Garnett 10; Asts: Rajon Rondo 9
Boston leads series, 1–0

TD Banknorth Garden, Boston
Attendance: 18,624
Referees: Steve Javie, Jimmy Clark, Luis Grillo

TNT

April 23
8:00 pm (ET)

Recap

Atlanta Hawks 77, Boston Celtics 96
Scoring by quarter: 20–24, 22–28, 16–24, 19–20
Pts: Smith, Williams 13; Rebs: Al Horford 9 Asts: Horford, Smith 3	Pts: Kevin Garnett 19; Rebs: Kevin Garnett 10; Asts: Rajon Rondo 8
Boston leads series, 2–0

TD Banknorth Garden, Boston
Attendance: 18,624
Referees: Joe DeRosa, Bill Spooner, Ed Malloy

ESPN

April 26
8:00 pm (ET)

Recap

Boston Celtics 93, Atlanta Hawks 102
Scoring by quarter: 26–32, 30–24, 18–28, 19–18
Pts: Kevin Garnett 32; Rebs: Kevin Garnett 10; Asts: Paul Pierce 8	Pts: Josh Smith 26; Rebs: Al Horford 14; Asts: Mike Bibby 8
Boston leads series, 2–1

Philips Arena, Atlanta, Georgia
Attendance: 19,725
Referees: Violet Palmer, Bennet Salvatore. Tom Washington

TNT

April 28
8:00 pm (ET)

Recap

Boston Celtics 92, Atlanta Hawks 97
Scoring by quarter: 24–29, 24–22, 27–14, 17–32
Pts: Ray Allen 21; Rebs: Kevin Garnett 9 Asts: Rajon Rondo 12	Pts: Joe Johnson 35; Rebs: Al Horford 13; Asts: Joe Johnson 6
Series tied, 2–2

Philips Arena, Atlanta, Georgia
Attendance: 20,016
Referees: Mike Callahan, Eddie Rush, Monty McCutchen

TNT

April 30
8:30 pm (ET)

Recap

Atlanta Hawks 85, Boston Celtics 110
Scoring by quarter: 19–27, 24–31, 21–23, 21–29
Pts: Joe Johnson 21; Rebs: Al Horford 10; Asts: Al Horford 5	Pts: Paul Pierce 22; Rebs: Paul Pierce 7 Asts: Kevin Garnett 7
Boston leads series, 3–2

TD Banknorth Garden, Boston
Attendance: 18,624
Referees: David Jones, Dick Bavetta, Joe Forte

ESPN

May 2
8:00 pm (ET)

Recap

Boston Celtics 100, Atlanta Hawks 103
Scoring by quarter: 32–20, 18–29, 32–30, 18–24
Pts: Kevin Garnett 22; Rebs: Kevin Garnett 7 Asts: Kevin Garnett 6	Pts: Marvin Williams 18; Rebs: Mike Bibby 6 Asts: Mike Bibby 7
Series tied, 3–3

Philips Arena, Atlanta, Georgia
Attendance: 20,425
Referees: Joe Crawford, Mark Wunderlich, Bob Delaney

ABC

May 4
1:00 pm (ET)

Recap

Atlanta Hawks 65, Boston Celtics 99
Scoring by quarter: 16–27, 10–17, 17–35, 22–20
Pts: Joe Johnson 16; Rebs: Al Horford 12; Asts: Al Horford 3	Pts: Paul Pierce 22; Rebs: Kevin Garnett 11; Asts: Rajon Rondo 6
Boston wins series, 4–3

TD Banknorth Garden, Boston
Attendance: 18,624
Referees: Ken Mauer, Dan Crawford, Bennett Salvatore

Regular-season series
Boston won 3–0 in the regular-season series

November 9, 2007

Recap

Atlanta Hawks 83, Boston Celtics 106

TD Banknorth Garden, Boston

March 2, 2008

Recap

Atlanta Hawks 88, Boston Celtics 98

TD Banknorth Garden, Boston

April 12, 2008

Recap

Boston Celtics 99, Atlanta Hawks 89

Philips Arena, Atlanta

This was the tenth playoff meeting between these two teams, with the Celtics winning eight of the first nine meetings.

Previous playoff series
Boston leads 8–1 in all-time playoff series

1957

Boston Celtics 4, St. Louis Hawks 3

1957 NBA Finals

1958

Boston Celtics 2, St. Louis Hawks 4

1958 NBA Finals

1960

Boston Celtics 4, St. Louis Hawks 3

1960 NBA Finals

1961

Boston Celtics 4, St. Louis Hawks 1

1961 NBA Finals

1972

Atlanta Hawks 2, Boston Celtics 4

1972 Eastern Conference Semifinals

1973

Atlanta Hawks 2, Boston Celtics 4

1973 Eastern Conference Semifinals

1983

Atlanta Hawks 1, Boston Celtics 2

1983 Eastern Conference First Round

1986

Atlanta Hawks 1, Boston Celtics 4

1986 Eastern Conference Semifinals

1988

Atlanta Hawks 3, Boston Celtics 4

1988 Eastern Conference Semifinals

Games 1 and 2 were Celtic routs, keyed by great team defense (Atlanta averaged 79 points in the first 2 games) and balanced Celtic scoring (six players were in double figures in Game 1, five in Game 2). The most buzz was generated by Mike Bibby stating that Celtic fans were bandwagoners after Game 1, prompting boos every time he touched the ball in Game 2.

In Game 3, Atlanta showed its athleticism with an array of dunks from Josh Smith (26 points) and a strong interior performance by the rookie Al Horford (17 points, 14 rebounds, 6 assists), who also jawed with Paul Pierce near the end of the game. There would be more jawing in Game 4 between Zaza Pachulia and Kevin Garnett, but the outcome was a surprise: thanks to fourth quarter heroics by Joe Johnson and Smith, who combined to score 32 of Atlanta's 34 4th quarter points, the upstart Hawks rallied from a 10-point third quarter deficit in Game 4 to tie the series going back to Boston. Boston dominated Game 5, but in Game 6, six Hawks players finished in double figures to force a winner-take-all Game 7. The Hawks were no match for the Celtics in Game 7, as the Celtics held them to 26 points in the 1st half. 3 minutes into the 2nd half, the series' tensions finally boiled over when Marvin Williams was ejected for committing a hard foul on Rajon Rondo. Then after that, Kevin Garnett was noted for trucking Zaza Pachulia while going for a screen.

==== (2) Detroit Pistons vs. (7) Philadelphia 76ers ====
TNT

April 20
6:00 pm (ET)

Recap

Philadelphia 76ers 90, Detroit Pistons 86
Scoring by quarter: 22–27, 16–24, 25–19, 27–16
Pts: Andre Miller 20; Rebs: Reggie Evans 14; Asts: Andre Iguodala 8	Pts: Rasheed Wallace 24; Rebs: Jason Maxiell 11; Asts: Richard Hamilton 4
Philadelphia leads series, 1–0

The Palace of Auburn Hills, Auburn Hills, Michigan
Attendance: 22,076
Referees: Tom Washington, Eddie Rush, Monty McCutchen

NBATV

April 23
7:30 pm (ET)

Recap

Philadelphia 76ers 88, Detroit Pistons 105
Scoring by quarter: 18–25, 18–28, 26–31, 26–21
Pts: Lou Williams 17; Rebs: Reggie Evans 11; Asts: Andre Iguodala 4	Pts: Richard Hamilton 20; Rebs: Antonio McDyess 12; Asts: Richard Hamilton 7
Series tied, 1–1

The Palace of Auburn Hills, Auburn Hills, Michigan
Attendance: 22,076
Referees: Steve Javie, Derrick Collins, Mark Wunderlich

ESPN2

April 25
7:00 pm (ET)

Recap

Detroit Pistons 75, Philadelphia 76ers 95
Scoring by quarter: 20–20, 20–24, 15–26, 20–25
Pts: Richard Hamilton 23; Rebs: Richard Hamilton 6 Asts: Rodney Stuckey 5	Pts: Samuel Dalembert 22; Rebs: Samuel Dalembert 16; Asts: Andre Iguodala 6
Philadelphia leads series, 2–1

Wachovia Center, Philadelphia
Attendance: 18,805
Referees: Joe Crawford, Bill Spooner, Michael Smith

TNT

April 27
7:00 pm (ET)

Recap

Detroit Pistons 93, Philadelphia 76ers 84
Scoring by quarter: 19–25, 17–21, 34–16, 23–22
Pts: Tayshaun Prince 23; Rebs: Rasheed Wallace 10; Asts: Chauncey Billups 6	Pts: Thaddeus Young 15; Rebs: Samuel Dalembert 12; Asts: Andre Iguodala 5
Series tied, 2–2

Wachovia Center, Philadelphia
Attendance: 18,347
Referees: Joe DeRosa, Ron Garretson, Derrick Stafford

NBATV

April 29
7:00 pm (ET)

Recap

Philadelphia 76ers 81, Detroit Pistons 98
Scoring by quarter: 21–35, 21–19, 17–25, 22–19
Pts: Andre Iguodala 23; Rebs: Reggie Evans 7 Asts: Andre Iguodala 6	Pts: Chauncey Billups 21; Rebs: Jason Maxiell 11; Asts: Chauncey Billups 12
Detroit leads series, 3–2

The Palace of Auburn Hills, Auburn Hills, Michigan
Attendance: 22,076
Referees: Ken Mauer, Bob Delaney, Tony Brothers

TNT

May 1
8:00 pm (ET)

Recap

Detroit Pistons 100, Philadelphia 76ers 77
Scoring by quarter: 30–12, 21–21, 28–18, 21–26
Pts: Richard Hamilton 24; Rebs: Tayshaun Prince 7 Asts: Chauncey Billups 7	Pts: Andre Iguodala 18; Rebs: Reggie Evans 6 Asts: Reggie Evans 7
Detroit wins series, 4–2

Wachovia Center, Philadelphia
Attendance: 14,130
Referees: Bennett Salvatore, Scott Foster, Jim Clark

Regular-season series
Tied 2–2 in the regular-season series

November 23, 2007

Recap

Philadelphia 76ers 78, Detroit Pistons 83

The Palace of Auburn Hills, Auburn Hills, Michigan

January 23, 2008

Recap

Detroit Pistons 86, Philadelphia 76ers 78

Wachovia Center, Philadelphia

March 12, 2008

Recap

Philadelphia 76ers 83, Detroit Pistons 82

The Palace of Auburn Hills, Auburn Hills, Michigan

April 9, 2008

Recap

Detroit Pistons 94, Philadelphia 76ers 101

Wachovia Center, Philadelphia

This was the fourth playoff meeting between these two teams, with the Pistons winning two of the first three meetings. The first meeting took place while the Nationals/76ers franchise were in Syracuse and the Pistons franchise were in Fort Wayne.

Previous playoff series
Detroit leads 2–1 in all-time playoff series

1955

Fort Wayne Pistons 3, Syracuse Nationals 4

1955 NBA Finals

2003

Detroit Pistons 4, Philadelphia 76ers 2

2003 Eastern Conference Semifinals

2005

Detroit Pistons 4, Philadelphia 76ers 1

2005 Eastern Conference First Round

Misses down the stretch by Tayshaun Prince and Rasheed Wallace kept the Pistons from beating the Sixers at their home floor as Andre Iguodala grabbed clutch defensive rebounds to seize home court advantage. The Pistons responded with a blowout in Game 2. Game 3 was close at halftime, but Samuel Dalembert and Andre Miller helped to break it open with strong overall performances. Detroit was behind by 10 in Game 4 at halftime and in danger of falling behind 3–1 going back home, but three second-half 3s by Rasheed Wallace and strong showings by Tayshaun Prince and Chauncey Billups keyed an 18-point 3rd quarter turnaround which evened the series. Detroit dominated Game 5 behind Billups's 14 points and 5 first quarter assists, jumping out to a 14-point lead and never looking back. Richard Hamilton keyed a similar start in Game 6, scoring 13 points, as the Pistons took an 18-point first quarter lead and eventually rolled into the second round.

==== (3) Orlando Magic vs. (6) Toronto Raptors ====
TNT

April 20
12:30 pm (ET)

Recap

Toronto Raptors 100, Orlando Magic 114
Scoring by quarter: 23–43, 24–17, 28–25, 25–29
Pts: Anthony Parker 24; Rebs: Rasho Nesterović 8 Asts: José Calderón 8	Pts: Dwight Howard 25; Rebs: Dwight Howard 22; Asts: Jameer Nelson 7
Orlando leads series, 1–0

Amway Arena, Orlando, Florida
Attendance: 17,519
Referees: Derrick Stafford, Greg Willard, Joe DeRosa

NBA TV

April 22
7:30 pm (ET)

Recap

Toronto Raptors 103, Orlando Magic 104
Scoring by quarter: 18–35, 39–24, 21–24, 25–21
Pts: Chris Bosh 29; Rebs: Chris Bosh 10; Asts: Bosh, Ford 6 each	Pts: Dwight Howard 29; Rebs: Dwight Howard 20; Asts: Türkoğlu, Lewis 5 each
Orlando leads series, 2–0

Amway Arena, Orlando, Florida
Attendance: 17,519
Referees: Jason Phillips, Jim Clark, Bob Delaney

NBA TV

April 24
7:30 pm (ET)

Recap

Orlando Magic 94, Toronto Raptors 108
Scoring by quarter: 20–28, 20–33, 29–19, 25–28
Pts: Hedo Türkoğlu 26; Rebs: Dwight Howard 12; Asts: Jameer Nelson 6	Pts: T. J. Ford 21; Rebs: Jamario Moon 10; Asts: José Calderón 13
Orlando leads series, 2–1

Air Canada Centre, Toronto, Ontario
Attendance: 20,023
Referees: Violet Palmer, Scott Foster, Dan Crawford

TNT

April 26
3:00 pm (ET)

Recap

Orlando Magic 106, Toronto Raptors 94
Scoring by quarter: 31–26, 17–27, 25–21, 33–20
Pts: Rashard Lewis 27; Rebs: Dwight Howard 16; Asts: Nelson, Lewis 5 each	Pts: Chris Bosh 39; Rebs: Chris Bosh 15; Asts: T. J. Ford 13
Orlando leads series, 3–1

Air Canada Centre, Toronto, Ontario
Attendance: 20,416
Referees: Derrick Collins, Dick Bavetta, Joe Forte

NBA TV

April 28
7:30 pm (ET)

Recap

Toronto Raptors 92, Orlando Magic 102
Scoring by quarter: 26–22, 24–27, 18–25, 24–28
Pts: Chris Bosh 16; Rebs: Chris Bosh 9 Asts: T. J. Ford 5	Pts: Dwight Howard 21; Rebs: Dwight Howard 21; Asts: Hedo Türkoğlu 9
Orlando wins series, 4–1

Amway Arena, Orlando, Florida
Attendance: 17,519
Referees: Bennett Salvatore, Tom Washington, Marc Davis

Regular-season series
Orlando won 2–1 in the regular-season series

November 7, 2007

Recap

Orlando Magic 105, Toronto Raptors 96

Air Canada Centre, Toronto, Ontario

February 20, 2008

Recap

Orlando Magic 110, Toronto Raptors 127

Air Canada Centre, Toronto, Ontario

March 4, 2008

Recap

Toronto Raptors 87, Orlando Magic 102

Amway Arena, Orlando, Florida

This was the first playoff meeting between the Magic and the Raptors.

Scoring 25 points and grabbing 22 rebounds, Dwight Howard gave the Magic their first playoffs win since 2003 as they practically led the entire game. Howard put up 29 and 20 in Game 2, as Hedo Türkoğlu scored the final four go-ahead points to give the Magic a 2–0 lead. The Raptors would respond with a strong Game 3 victory keyed by great point guard play from T. J. Ford and José Calderón. But Jameer Nelson, Rashard Lewis and Keith Bogans keyed strong three point shooting in Game 4 and overcame Chris Bosh's 39 points and 15 rebounds to bring the Magic out of Toronto with a 3–1 lead. Howard finished off the series in Game 5 as impressively as he started–21 points, 21 rebounds, 3 blocks giving the Magic their first playoff series victory since 1996.

==== (4) Cleveland Cavaliers vs. (5) Washington Wizards ====
ESPN

April 19
12:30 pm

Recap

Washington Wizards 86, Cleveland Cavaliers 93
Scoring by quarter: 24–19, 22–27, 23–19, 17–28
Pts: Antawn Jamison 23; Rebs: Antawn Jamison 19; Asts: DeShawn Stevenson 5	Pts: LeBron James 32; Rebs: Zydrunas Ilgauskas 11; Asts: West, Gibson 5 each
Cleveland leads series, 1–0

Quicken Loans Arena, Cleveland, Ohio
Attendance: 20,562
Referees: Bob Delaney, Scott Foster, David Jones

TNT

April 21
7:00 pm

Recap

Washington Wizards 86, Cleveland Cavaliers 116
Scoring by quarter: 22–27, 18–26, 23–33, 23–30
Pts: three players 12 each Rebs: Antawn Jamison 9 Asts: Caron Butler 5	Pts: LeBron James 30; Rebs: Ilgauskas, James 9 each Asts: LeBron James 12
Cleveland leads series, 2–0

Quicken Loans Arena, Cleveland, Ohio
Attendance: 20,562
Referees: Dan Crawford, Rodney Mott, Mark Wunderlich

TNT

April 24
8:00 pm

Recap

Cleveland Cavaliers 72, Washington Wizards 108
Scoring by quarter: 17–21, 16–28, 18–28, 21–31
Pts: LeBron James 22; Rebs: Anderson Varejão 9 Asts: three players 3 each	Pts: DeShawn Stevenson 19; Rebs: Jamison, Blatche 7 each Asts: Antonio Daniels 6
Cleveland leads series, 2–1

Verizon Center, Washington, D.C.
Attendance: 20,173
Referees: Jim Clark, Sean Corbin, Eddie Rush

ABC

April 27
1:00 pm

Recap

Cleveland Cavaliers 100, Washington Wizards 97
Scoring by quarter: 24–28, 30–16, 26–29, 20–24
Pts: LeBron James 34; Rebs: James, Wallace 12 each Asts: LeBron James 7	Pts: Antawn Jamison 23; Rebs: Antawn Jamison 11; Asts: DeShawn Stevenson 5
Cleveland leads series, 3–1

Verizon Center, Washington, D.C.
Attendance: 20,173
Referees: Joe Crawford, Michael Smith, Bill Spooner

TNT

April 30
6:00 pm

Recap

Washington Wizards 88, Cleveland Cavaliers 87
Scoring by quarter: 23–16, 22–27, 24–22, 19–22
Pts: Caron Butler 32; Rebs: Antawn Jamison 11; Asts: Caron Butler 5	Pts: LeBron James 34; Rebs: LeBron James 10; Asts: Delonte West 8
Cleveland leads series, 3–2

Quicken Loans Arena, Cleveland, Ohio
Attendance: 20,562
Referees: Mike Callahan, James Capers, Joe Derosa

ESPN2

May 2
7:00 pm

Recap

Cleveland Cavaliers 105, Washington Wizards 88
Scoring by quarter: 27–31, 29–17, 23–16, 26–24
Pts: LeBron James 27; Rebs: LeBron James 13; Asts: LeBron James 13	Pts: Antawn Jamison 23; Rebs: Antawn Jamison 15; Asts: Antonio Daniels 5
Cleveland wins series, 4–2

Verizon Center, Washington, D.C.
Attendance: 20,173
Referees: Steve Javie, Ken Mauer, Tom Washington

Regular-season series
Tied 2–2 in the regular-season series

December 5, 2007

Recap

Cleveland Cavaliers 86, Washington Wizards 105

Verizon Center, Washington, D.C.

January 23, 2008

Recap

Washington Wizards 85, Cleveland Cavaliers 121

Quicken Loans Arena, Cleveland, Ohio

February 22, 2008

Recap

Washington Wizards 89, Cleveland Cavaliers 90

Quicken Loans Arena, Cleveland, Ohio

March 13, 2008

Recap

Cleveland Cavaliers 99, Washington Wizards 101

Verizon Center, Washington, D.C.

This was the fifth playoff meeting between these two teams, with the Cavaliers winning three of the first four meetings.

Previous playoff series
Cleveland leads 3–1 in all-time playoff series

1976

Cleveland Cavaliers 4, Washington Bullets 3

1976 Eastern Conference Semifinals

1977

Cleveland Cavaliers 1, Washington Bullets 2

1977 Eastern Conference First Round

2006

Cleveland Cavaliers 4, Washington Wizards 2

2006 Eastern Conference First Round

2007

Cleveland Cavaliers 4, Washington Wizards 0

2007 Eastern Conference First Round

LeBron James, labeled as "overrated" by Wizards guard DeShawn Stevenson, scored 20 of his 32 points in the second half to help the Cavs draw first blood in their third first round meeting in as many years. The Cavs and Wizards traded blowouts in Games 2 and 3, but Cleveland took a 3–1 lead in the Verizon Center off of Delonte West's last second 3. Washington stayed alive by winning Game 5 when Caron Butler converted a running shot with only seconds left, capping off his 32-point performance. However, James led the Cavs to a dominating Game 6 victory in Washington with a triple-double (27 points, 13 rebounds, 13 assists); he also received crucial outside shooting from Wally Szczerbiak and Daniel Gibson, who combined for 48 points.

This series was marked by several physical plays on James, with Brendan Haywood, Stevenson, and Darius Songaila picking up technical and flagrant fouls for hard contact on him.

=== Western Conference first round ===
==== (1) Los Angeles Lakers vs. (8) Denver Nuggets ====
ABC

April 20
12:00 pm

Recap

Denver Nuggets 114, Los Angeles Lakers 128
Scoring by quarter: 22–26, 34–32, 22–39, 36–31
Pts: Iverson, Anthony 30 each Rebs: Carmelo Anthony 12; Asts: Allen Iverson 7	Pts: Pau Gasol 36; Rebs: Pau Gasol 16; Asts: Pau Gasol 8
LA Lakers lead series, 1–0

Staples Center, Los Angeles
Attendance: 18,997
Referees: Joe Crawford, Marc Davis, Ken Mauer

TNT

April 23
7:30 pm

Recap

Denver Nuggets 107, Los Angeles Lakers 122
Scoring by quarter: 32–33, 17–26, 30–30, 28–33
Pts: Allen Iverson 31; Rebs: Marcus Camby 17; Asts: Allen Iverson 6	Pts: Kobe Bryant 49; Rebs: Pau Gasol 10; Asts: Kobe Bryant 10
LA Lakers lead series, 2–0

Staples Center, Los Angeles
Attendance: 18,997
Referees: Luis Grillo, Monty McCutchen, Bennett Salvatore

TNT

April 26
3:30 pm

Recap

Los Angeles Lakers 102, Denver Nuggets 84
Scoring by quarter: 23–20, 30–26, 30–18, 19–20
Pts: Kobe Bryant 22; Rebs: three players 7 each Asts: Kobe Bryant 8	Pts: Carmelo Anthony 16; Rebs: Marcus Camby 12; Asts: Marcus Camby 4
LA Lakers lead series, 3–0

Pepsi Center, Denver, Colorado
Attendance: 19,602
Referees: Dan Crawford, Bill Kennedy, Greg Willard

TNT

April 28
8:30 pm

Recap

Los Angeles Lakers 107, Denver Nuggets 101
Scoring by quarter: 32–23, 32–31, 15–23, 28–24
Pts: Kobe Bryant 31; Rebs: Lamar Odom 12; Asts: Kobe Bryant 6	Pts: Allen Iverson 22; Rebs: Marcus Camby 17; Asts: Anthony Carter 6
LA Lakers win series, 4–0

Pepsi Center, Denver, Colorado
Attendance: 19,264
Referees: Dick Bavetta, Joe Forte, Courtney Kirkland

Regular-season series
Los Angeles won 3–0 in the regular-season series

November 29, 2007

Recap

Denver Nuggets 99, Los Angeles Lakers 127

Staples Center, Los Angeles

December 5, 2007

Recap

Los Angeles Lakers 111, Denver Nuggets 107

Pepsi Center, Denver, Colorado

January 21, 2008

Recap

Denver Nuggets 99, Los Angeles Lakers 116

Staples Center, Los Angeles

This was the fourth playoff meeting between these two teams, with the Lakers winning the first three meetings.

Previous playoff series
Los Angeles leads 3–0 in all-time playoff series

1979

Denver Nuggets 1, Los Angeles Lakers 2

1979 Western Conference First Round

1985

Denver Nuggets 1, Los Angeles Lakers 4

1985 Western Conference Finals

1987

Denver Nuggets 0, Los Angeles Lakers 3

1987 Western Conference First Round

In Pau Gasol's playoff debut with the Lakers, he scored 36 points, 16 rebounds, 8 assists and 3 blocks as the Lakers beat the Nuggets in Game 1. Kobe Bryant gave the fans a vintage performance in Game 2 by scoring 49 points and adding 10 assists in a blowout at Staples Center. The Nuggets were routed at home in Game 3, with Carmelo Anthony stating the team quit in the second half. Game 4 was closer, but Bryant led the Lakers with 14 points in the last 5½ minutes to sweep the Nuggets at the Pepsi Center. It was the first time the Lakers advanced to the second round since the 2004 season. The Lakers led at the end of every quarter throughout the whole series, only the seventh time that had happened in NBA history.

==== (2) New Orleans Hornets vs. (7) Dallas Mavericks ====
ESPN

April 19
6:00 pm

Recap

Dallas Mavericks 92, New Orleans Hornets 104
Scoring by quarter: 26–19, 26–21, 20–36, 20–28
Pts: Dirk Nowitzki 31; Rebs: Dirk Nowitzki 10; Asts: Jason Kidd 9	Pts: Chris Paul 35; Rebs: Tyson Chandler 15; Asts: Chris Paul 10
New Orleans leads series, 1–0

New Orleans Arena, New Orleans, Louisiana
Attendance: 17,446
Referees: Dick Bavetta, Sean Corbin, Joe Forte

TNT

April 22
6:00 pm

Recap

Dallas Mavericks 103, New Orleans Hornets 127
Scoring by quarter: 29–39, 22–28, 28–32, 24–28
Pts: Dirk Nowitzki 27; Rebs: Brandon Bass 8 Asts: Jason Kidd 8	Pts: Chris Paul 32; Rebs: Tyson Chandler 11; Asts: Chris Paul 17
New Orleans leads series, 2–0

New Orleans Arena, New Orleans, Louisiana
Attendance: 17,855
Referees: Joe Crawford, Courtney Kirkland, Greg Willard

ESPN

April 25
7:00 pm

Recap

New Orleans Hornets 87, Dallas Mavericks 97
Scoring by quarter: 16–23, 24–24, 23–27, 24–23
Pts: Jannero Pargo 30; Rebs: Tyson Chandler 11; Asts: Chris Paul 10	Pts: Dirk Nowitzki 32; Rebs: Dirk Nowitzki 19; Asts: Nowitzki, Terry 6 each
New Orleans leads series, 2–1

American Airlines Center, Dallas
Attendance: 20,839
Referees: Tony Brothers, Joe DeRosa, Ron Garretson

TNT

April 27
8:30 pm

Recap

New Orleans Hornets 97, Dallas Mavericks 84
Scoring by quarter: 23–30, 25–14, 28–22, 21–18
Pts: David West 30; Rebs: David West 9 Asts: Chris Paul 8	Pts: Dirk Nowitzki 22; Rebs: Dirk Nowitzki 13; Asts: three players 3 each
New Orleans leads series, 3–1

American Airlines Center, Dallas
Attendance: 20,644
Referees: James Capers, Steve Javie, Mark Wunderlich

TNT

April 29
6:00 pm

Recap

Dallas Mavericks 94, New Orleans Hornets 99
Scoring by quarter: 22–28, 17–26, 24–17, 31–28
Pts: Dirk Nowitzki 22; Rebs: Dirk Nowitzki 13; Asts: Terry, Kidd 9 each	Pts: David West 29; Rebs: Tyson Chandler 14; Asts: Chris Paul 15
New Orleans wins series, 4–1

New Orleans Arena, New Orleans, Louisiana
Attendance: 18,260
Referees: Dan Crawford, Scott Foster, Bill Kennedy

Regular-season series
Tied 2–2 in the regular-season series

December 1, 2007

Recap

Dallas Mavericks 108, New Orleans Hornets 112 (OT)

New Orleans Arena, New Orleans, Louisiana

December 14, 2007

Recap

New Orleans Hornets 80, Dallas Mavericks 89

American Airlines Center, Dallas

February 20, 2008

Recap

Dallas Mavericks 93, New Orleans Hornets 104

New Orleans Arena, New Orleans, Louisiana

April 16, 2008

Recap

New Orleans Hornets 98, Dallas Mavericks 111

American Airlines Center, Dallas

This was the first playoff meeting between the Mavericks and the New Orleans Pelicans/Hornets franchise.

In his playoff debut, Chris Paul scored 35 points, dished out 10 assists, and stole the ball 4 times to lead the Hornets to a comeback home win against the Mavericks. He would replicate that type of performance in Game 2 with 32 points and 17 assists. Dallas would come out with a dominant Game 3 performance at home after inserting Jason Terry into the starting lineup, but New Orleans would win the final 2 games of the series, keyed by David West in Game 4 and Paul's triple-double in Game 5.

==== (3) San Antonio Spurs vs. (6) Phoenix Suns ====
ABC

April 19
2:00 pm

Recap

Phoenix Suns 115, San Antonio Spurs 117 (2OT)
Scoring by quarter: 24–20, 24–20, 23–25, 22–28, Overtime: 11–11, 11–13
Pts: Steve Nash 25; Rebs: Leandro Barbosa 8 Asts: Steve Nash 13	Pts: Tim Duncan 40; Rebs: Tim Duncan 15; Asts: three players 5 each
San Antonio leads series, 1–0

AT&T Center, San Antonio
Attendance: 18,797
Referees: Tony Brothers, Mike Callahan, Bennett Salvatore

TNT

April 22
8:30 pm

Recap

Phoenix Suns 96, San Antonio Spurs 102
Scoring by quarter: 35–26, 26–28, 11–27, 24–21
Pts: Amar'e Stoudemire 33; Rebs: Shaquille O'Neal 14; Asts: Steve Nash 10	Pts: Tony Parker 32; Rebs: Tim Duncan 17; Asts: Tony Parker 7
San Antonio leads series, 2–0

AT&T Center, San Antonio
Attendance: 18,797
Referees: Dick Bavetta, Ken Mauer, Leon Wood

ESPN

April 25
7:30 pm

Recap

San Antonio Spurs 115, Phoenix Suns 99
Scoring by quarter: 33–19, 28–28, 30–25, 24–27
Pts: Tony Parker 41; Rebs: Tim Duncan 10; Asts: Tony Parker 12	Pts: Amar'e Stoudemire 28; Rebs: Amar'e Stoudemire 11; Asts: Steve Nash 9
San Antonio leads series, 3–0

US Airways Center, Phoenix, Arizona
Attendance: 18,422
Referees: James Capers, Steve Javie, Monty McCutchen

ABC

April 27
1:30 pm

Recap

San Antonio Spurs 86, Phoenix Suns 105
Scoring by quarter: 13–34, 30–31, 22–28, 21–12
Pts: Tony Parker 18; Rebs: Tim Duncan 10; Asts: Tony Parker 3	Pts: Raja Bell 27; Rebs: Shaquille O'Neal 12; Asts: Boris Diaw 8
San Antonio leads series, 3–1

US Airways Center, Phoenix, Arizona
Attendance: 18,422
Referees: Bob Delaney, Scott Foster, David Jones

TNT

April 29
8:30 pm

Recap

Phoenix Suns 87, San Antonio Spurs 92
Scoring by quarter: 26–30, 19–24, 27–15, 15–23
Pts: Boris Diaw 22; Rebs: Amar'e Stoudemire 11; Asts: Boris Diaw 8	Pts: Tony Parker 31; Rebs: Tim Duncan 17; Asts: Tony Parker 8
San Antonio wins series, 4–1

AT&T Center, San Antonio
Attendance: 18,797
Referees: Joe Crawford, Derrick Stafford, Greg Willard

Regular-season series
Phoenix won 3–1 in the regular-season series

December 17, 2007

Recap

Phoenix Suns 100, San Antonio Spurs 95

AT&T Center, San Antonio

January 31, 2008

Recap

San Antonio Spurs 84, Phoenix Suns 81

US Airways Center, Phoenix, Arizona

March 9, 2008

Recap

San Antonio Spurs 87, Phoenix Suns 94

US Airways Center, Phoenix, Arizona

April 9, 2008

Recap

Phoenix Suns 96, San Antonio Spurs 79

AT&T Center, San Antonio

This was the ninth playoff meeting between these two teams, with the Spurs winning five of the first eight meetings.

Previous playoff series
San Antonio leads 5–3 in all-time playoff series

1992

Phoenix Suns 3, San Antonio Spurs 0

1992 Western Conference First Round

1993

Phoenix Suns 4, San Antonio Spurs 2

1993 Western Conference Semifinals

1996

Phoenix Suns 1, San Antonio Spurs 3

1996 Western Conference First Round

1998

Phoenix Suns 1, San Antonio Spurs 3

1998 Western Conference First Round

2000

Phoenix Suns 3, San Antonio Spurs 1

2000 Western Conference First Round

2003

Phoenix Suns 2, San Antonio Spurs 4

2003 Western Conference First Round

2005

Phoenix Suns 1, San Antonio Spurs 4

2005 Western Conference Finals

2007

Phoenix Suns 2, San Antonio Spurs 4

2007 Western Conference Semifinals

Michael Finley made a game-tying three in regulation, Tim Duncan scored 40 points, including a rare three-point field goal to force a second overtime, and Manu Ginóbili clinched victory with a drive to the basket to break the 115-all deadlock with 1.8 seconds left to win a classic Game 1. Tony Parker would then pace the Spurs to their next two victories in the series, scoring 32 and 41 in Games 2 and 3 respectively. At the brink of elimination, Phoenix responded with a strong Game 4. But costly missed free throws by Shaquille O'Neal and key turnovers by Steve Nash helped San Antonio to prevail in Game 5, led again by Parker's 31 points.

Also notable was Gregg Popovich's use of the Hack-a-Shaq throughout the series to disrupt the Suns offense when Shaquille O'Neal was on the floor. O'Neal would shoot 64 free throws in the five games, making 32 of them.

==== (4) Utah Jazz vs. (5) Houston Rockets ====
ESPN

April 19
8:30 pm

Recap

Utah Jazz 93, Houston Rockets 82
Scoring by quarter: 23–18, 24–23, 21–19, 25–22
Pts: Andrei Kirilenko 21; Rebs: Carlos Boozer 16; Asts: Deron Williams 10	Pts: Shane Battier 22; Rebs: Luis Scola 13; Asts: Tracy McGrady 7
Utah leads series, 1–0

Toyota Center, Houston, Texas
Attendance: 18,213
Referees: Dan Crawford, Ron Garretson, Bill Kennedy

TNT

April 21
8:30 pm

Recap

Utah Jazz 90, Houston Rockets 84
Scoring by quarter: 26–17, 21–24, 22–26, 21–17
Pts: Deron Williams 22; Rebs: Mehmet Okur 16; Asts: Deron Williams 5	Pts: Tracy McGrady 23; Rebs: Tracy McGrady 13; Asts: Tracy McGrady 9
Utah leads series, 2–0

Toyota Center, Houston, Texas
Attendance: 18,158
Referees: Tony Brothers, Mike Callahan, Bennett Salvatore

TNT

April 24
8:30 pm

Recap

Houston Rockets 94, Utah Jazz 92
Scoring by quarter: 27–23, 17–21, 26–32, 24–16
Pts: Tracy McGrady 27; Rebs: Carl Landry 11; Asts: Tracy McGrady 7	Pts: Deron Williams 28; Rebs: Carlos Boozer 13; Asts: Deron Williams 12
Utah leads series, 2–1

EnergySolutions Arena, Salt Lake City
Attendance: 19,911
Referees: Bob Delaney, Tom Washington, Leon Wood

ESPN

April 26
8:30 pm

Recap

Houston Rockets 82, Utah Jazz 86
Scoring by quarter: 23–21, 15–25, 23–20, 21–20
Pts: Tracy McGrady 23; Rebs: Tracy McGrady 10; Asts: Tracy McGrady 8	Pts: Deron Williams 17; Rebs: Mehmet Okur 18; Asts: Deron Williams 9
Utah leads series, 3–1

EnergySolutions Arena, Salt Lake City
Attendance: 19,911
Referees: Marc Davis, Ken Mauer, Eddie Rush

NBA TV

April 29
8:30 pm

Recap

Utah Jazz 69, Houston Rockets 95
Scoring by quarter: 16–18, 16–25, 23–31, 14–21
Pts: Carlos Boozer 19; Rebs: Okur, Boozer 10 each Asts: Deron Williams 6	Pts: Tracy McGrady 29; Rebs: Luis Scola 12; Asts: Rafer Alston 6
Utah leads series, 3–2

Toyota Center, Houston, Texas
Attendance: 18,269
Referees: Sean Corbin, Steve Javie, Mark Wunderlich

ESPN

May 2
8:30 pm

Recap

Houston Rockets 91, Utah Jazz 113
Scoring by quarter: 22–32, 32–26, 11–27, 26–28
Pts: Tracy McGrady 40; Rebs: Tracy McGrady 10; Asts: Tracy McGrady 5	Pts: Deron Williams 25; Rebs: Mehmet Okur 13; Asts: Deron Williams 9
Utah wins series, 4–2

EnergySolutions Arena, Salt Lake City
Attendance: 19,911
Referees: Joe DeRosa, Bill Spooner, Derrick Stafford

- This is the last playoff match-up between Utah & Houston until 2018.

Regular-season series
Utah won 2–1 in the regular-season series

November 1, 2007

Recap

Houston Rockets 106, Utah Jazz 95

EnergySolutions Arena, Salt Lake City

January 27, 2008

Recap

Utah Jazz 97, Houston Rockets 89

Toyota Center, Houston, Texas

April 14, 2008

Recap

Houston Rockets 96, Utah Jazz 105

EnergySolutions Arena, Salt Lake City

This was the seventh playoff meeting between these two teams, with the Jazz winning four of the first six meetings.

Previous playoff series
Utah leads 4–2 in all-time playoff series

1985

Houston Rockets 2, Utah Jazz 3

1985 Western Conference First Round

1994

Houston Rockets 4, Utah Jazz 1

1994 Western Conference Finals

1995

Houston Rockets 3, Utah Jazz 2

1995 Western Conference First Round

1997

Houston Rockets 2, Utah Jazz 4

1997 Western Conference Finals

1998

Houston Rockets 2, Utah Jazz 3

1998 Western Conference First Round

2007

Houston Rockets 3, Utah Jazz 4

2007 Western Conference First Round

The Jazz had a balanced game from Andrei Kirilenko, Carlos Boozer and Deron Williams to steal the home court advantage away from the Rockets. A similar performance in Game 2 put Utah in a commanding 2–0 lead going back to Salt Lake City. Rafer Alston's return to the Houston lineup after injury, along with Tracy McGrady's 27 points and Carl Landry's key block of Deron Williams helped Houston steal Game 3 on the road. Williams responded with a strong performance in a Game 4 victory, plus got some help from Mehmet Okur with his offensive rebound off of his two missed free throws. The Rockets controlled Game 5 to stay alive, but despite getting 40 points, 10 rebounds, and 5 assists from McGrady in Game 6 and 15 pts from Luis Scola, the rest of the team shot 10/39 from the field and could not overcome losing Alston to an ankle injury as the Jazz blew the game open with a 27–11 3rd quarter.

== Conference semifinals ==
=== Eastern Conference semifinals ===
==== (1) Boston Celtics vs. (4) Cleveland Cavaliers ====
TNT

May 6
8:00 pm

Recap

Cleveland Cavaliers 72, Boston Celtics 76
Scoring by quarter: 15–25, 22–16, 15–12, 20–23
Pts: Zydrunas Ilgauskas 22; Rebs: Zydrunas Ilgauskas 12; Asts: LeBron James 9	Pts: Kevin Garnett 28; Rebs: Kendrick Perkins 12; Asts: Rajon Rondo 6
Boston leads series, 1–0

TD Banknorth Garden, Boston
Attendance: 18,624
Referees: Scott Foster, Eddie Rush, Michael Smith

ESPN

May 8
7:00 pm

Recap

Cleveland Cavaliers 73, Boston Celtics 89
Scoring by quarter: 24–17, 12–27, 15–26, 22–19
Pts: LeBron James 21; Rebs: Anderson Varejão 10; Asts: LeBron James 6	Pts: Paul Pierce 19; Rebs: Kevin Garnett 12; Asts: Rajon Rondo 6
Boston leads series, 2–0

TD Banknorth Garden, Boston
Attendance: 18,624
Referees: Joe Crawford, Bill Spooner, Derrick Stafford

ABC

May 10
8:00 pm

Recap

Boston Celtics 84, Cleveland Cavaliers 108
Scoring by quarter: 13–32, 22–20, 28–27, 21–29
Pts: Kevin Garnett 17; Rebs: Kevin Garnett 9 Asts: Paul Pierce 5	Pts: James, West 21 each Rebs: Ben Wallace 9 Asts: LeBron James 8
Boston leads series, 2–1

Quicken Loans Arena, Cleveland, Ohio
Attendance: 20,562
Referees: Bob Delaney, Steve Javie, Mark Wunderlich

TNT

May 12
8:00 pm

Recap

Boston Celtics 77, Cleveland Cavaliers 88
Scoring by quarter: 21–23, 22–22, 22–23, 12–20
Pts: three players 15 each Rebs: Kevin Garnett 10; Asts: Garnett, Rondo 4 each	Pts: LeBron James 21; Rebs: Ilgauskas, Wallace 7 each Asts: LeBron James 13
Series tied, 2–2

Quicken Loans Arena, Cleveland, Ohio
Attendance: 20,562
Referees: Jim Clark, Bennett Salvatore, Greg Willard

TNT

May 14
8:00 pm

Recap

Cleveland Cavaliers 89, Boston Celtics 96
Scoring by quarter: 23–18, 23–25, 17–29, 26–24
Pts: LeBron James 35; Rebs: Ilgauskas, Varejão 7 each Asts: LeBron James 5	Pts: Paul Pierce 29; Rebs: Kevin Garnett 16; Asts: Rajon Rondo 13
Boston leads series, 3–2

TD Banknorth Garden, Boston
Attendance: 18,624
Referees: Tony Brothers, Dan Crawford, Ron Garretson

ESPN

May 16
8:00 pm

Recap

Boston Celtics 69, Cleveland Cavaliers 74
Scoring by quarter: 18–18, 15–24, 17–17, 19–15
Pts: Kevin Garnett 25; Rebs: Kevin Garnett 8 Asts: Rajon Rondo 5	Pts: LeBron James 32; Rebs: LeBron James 12; Asts: LeBron James 6
Series tied, 3–3

Quicken Loans Arena, Cleveland, Ohio
Attendance: 20,562
Referees: Dick Bavetta, Joe DeRosa, Joe Forte

ABC

May 18
3:30 pm

Recap

Cleveland Cavaliers 92, Boston Celtics 97
Scoring by quarter: 13–18, 27–32, 28–23, 24–24
Pts: LeBron James 45; Rebs: Joe Smith 6 Asts: LeBron James 6	Pts: Paul Pierce 41; Rebs: Kevin Garnett 13; Asts: Rajon Rondo 8
Boston wins series, 4–3

TD Banknorth Garden, Boston
Attendance: 18,624
Referees: Ken Mauer, Eddie Rush, Bennett Salvatore

Regular-season series
Tied 2–2 in the regular-season series

November 27, 2007

Recap

Boston Celtics 104, Cleveland Cavaliers 109 (OT)

Quicken Loans Arena, Cleveland, Ohio

December 2, 2007

Recap

Cleveland Cavaliers 70, Boston Celtics 80

TD Banknorth Garden, Boston

February 5, 2008

Recap

Boston Celtics 113, Cleveland Cavaliers 114

Quicken Loans Arena, Cleveland, Ohio

February 27, 2008

Recap

Cleveland Cavaliers 87, Boston Celtics 92

TD Banknorth Garden, Boston

This was the fourth playoff meeting between these two teams, with the Celtics winning two of the first three meetings.

Previous playoff series
Boston leads 2–1 in all-time playoff series

1976

Boston Celtics 4, Cleveland Cavaliers 2

1976 Eastern Conference Finals

1985

Boston Celtics 3, Cleveland Cavaliers 1

1985 Eastern Conference First Round

1992

Boston Celtics 3, Cleveland Cavaliers 4

1992 Eastern Conference Semifinals

Although the Celtics had a quick turnaround from their unexpected seven-game series with Atlanta, they managed to hold off the Cavs by winning the first two games in Boston. Kevin Garnett scored 28 points and 8 rebounds and made the go-ahead shot in Game 1. LeBron James would only shoot 8 for 42 from the field in the first 2 games.

Cleveland would come back to win the next two games, Game 3, a blowout where five Cavs scored in double figures, and Game 4 where James would punctuate the victory with a dunk over Garnett. James's shooting improved in the return to the Garden in Game 5, but received minimal help from his teammates as Rajon Rondo, Garnett, and Paul Pierce all scored over 20 points to push Boston over the top. Game 6 was an ugly affair, with both teams shooting under 40 percent, but a 32–12–6 performance by James was enough. Boston, the best road team in the regular season, fell to 0–6 on the road.

Game 7 would end in a duel between Pierce (41 points) and James (45 points) that some compared to the Bird–Wilkins duel in the 1988 Eastern Conference Semifinals. But timely offensive rebounding (10 in all), 18 second chance points, and a few key shots from Celtics veteran P.J. Brown helped push Boston into the Eastern Conference Finals.

==== (2) Detroit Pistons vs. (3) Orlando Magic ====
TNT

May 3
7:30 pm

Recap

Orlando Magic 72, Detroit Pistons 91
Scoring by quarter: 22–22, 20–21, 16–22, 14–26
Pts: Lewis, Türkoğlu 18 each Rebs: Dwight Howard 8 Asts: Jameer Nelson 5	Pts: Chauncey Billups 19; Rebs: Jason Maxiell 9 Asts: Chauncey Billups 7
Detroit leads series, 1–0

The Palace of Auburn Hills, Auburn Hills, Michigan
Attendance: 22,076
Referees: Dick Bavetta, Sean Corbin, Monty McCutchen

TNT

May 5
7:00 pm

Recap

Orlando Magic 93, Detroit Pistons 100
Scoring by quarter: 29–29, 11–21, 36–28, 17–22
Pts: Howard, Nelson 22; Rebs: Dwight Howard 18; Asts: Hedo Türkoğlu 7	Pts: Chauncey Billups 28; Rebs: Tayshaun Prince 10; Asts: Tayshaun Prince 5
Detroit leads series, 2–0

The Palace of Auburn Hills, Auburn Hills, Michigan
Attendance: 22,076
Referees: Joe Forte, Steve Javie, Derrick Stafford

TNT

May 7
8:00 pm

Recap

Detroit Pistons 86, Orlando Magic 111
Scoring by quarter: 16–30, 26–24, 27–19, 17–38
Pts: Richard Hamilton 24; Rebs: Tayshaun Prince 7 Asts: Hamilton, Prince 3 each	Pts: Rashard Lewis 33; Rebs: Dwight Howard 12; Asts: Hedo Türkoğlu 6
Detroit leads series, 2–1

Amway Arena, Orlando, Florida
Attendance: 17,519
Referees: Joe Forte, Steve Javie, Derrick Stafford

ESPN

May 10
5:00 pm

Recap

Detroit Pistons 90, Orlando Magic 89
Scoring by quarter: 21–27, 23–28, 26–15, 20–19
Pts: Richard Hamilton 32; Rebs: Antonio McDyess 14; Asts: Tayshaun Prince 5	Pts: Hedo Türkoğlu 20; Rebs: Dwight Howard 12; Asts: Hedo Türkoğlu 4
Detroit leads series, 3–1

Amway Arena, Orlando, Florida
Attendance: 17,519
Referees: Mike Callahan, Joe Crawford, Tom Washington

TNT

May 13
7:00 pm

Recap

Orlando Magic 86, Detroit Pistons 91
Scoring by quarter: 20–20, 21–27, 27–18, 18–26
Pts: Hedo Türkoğlu 18; Rebs: Dwight Howard 17; Asts: Hedo Türkoğlu 7	Pts: Richard Hamilton 31; Rebs: Antonio McDyess 11; Asts: Rodney Stuckey 6
Detroit wins series, 4–1

The Palace of Auburn Hills, Auburn Hills, Michigan
Attendance: 22,076
Referees: Scott Foster, Ken Mauer, Eddie Rush

Regular-season series
Tied 2–2 in the regular-season series

November 2, 2007

Recap

Detroit Pistons 116, Orlando Magic 92

Amway Arena, Orlando, Florida

January 21, 2008

Recap

Detroit Pistons 100, Orlando Magic 102

Amway Arena, Orlando, Florida

January 25, 2008

Recap

Orlando Magic 93, Detroit Pistons 101

The Palace of Auburn Hills, Auburn Hills, Michigan

February 19, 2008

Recap

Orlando Magic 103, Detroit Pistons 85

The Palace of Auburn Hills, Auburn Hills, Michigan

This was the fourth playoff meeting between these two teams, with the Pistons winning two of the first three meetings.

Previous playoff series
Detroit leads 2–1 in all-time playoff series

1996

Detroit Pistons 0, Orlando Magic 3

1996 Eastern Conference First Round

2003

Detroit Pistons 4, Orlando Magic 3

2003 Eastern Conference First Round

2007

Detroit Pistons 4, Orlando Magic 0

2007 Eastern Conference First Round

The Pistons opened up with a rout in Game 1, as Detroit's big men keyed in on Dwight Howard and forced him to playoff lows 12 points and 8 rebounds, with five Pistons scoring in double figures. After being quiet in Game 1, the Magic's 3-point shooting picked up (11/26, with Jameer Nelson making 5-of-8), but could not overcome 19 turnovers and fell down in the series 2–0. There was a controversial call at the end of the third quarter, where Chauncey Billups made a 3 near the end of the 3rd quarter when the clock froze and approximately 0.5 seconds remained, but TNT clocks later revealed that Billups could not have gotten the ball off in time.

The Magic would take a 24–6 lead at home in Game 3 and use a 38–17 4th quarter to blow out Detroit; they were paced by 33 points by Rashard Lewis. Billups would injure his right hamstring early in the game and miss the remainder of the series, but they would not need him for Game 4 as Richard Hamilton scored 32 points and the Pistons came from 15 back in the 3rd quarter. Tayshaun Prince made the go-ahead basket with 8.9 seconds left and Hedo Türkoğlu missed a layup as time ran out.

Billups's starting replacement, Rodney Stuckey, struggled in Game 4, but came back with a strong Game 5. The Magic would outshoot the Pistons 48 to 36 percent, would make 36 percent of their 3s compared to 21 percent for Detroit, and outrebound them 46 to 38, but turned the ball over 21 times while Detroit had only 3. Rip Hamilton again led Detroit with 31 points, and Prince made the crucial defensive play by blocking Türkoğlu's layup in the waning seconds. Detroit advanced to their sixth straight Eastern Conference Finals, the longest Conference Finals streak since the Los Angeles Lakers went to eight straight in the 80s. This marked the most recent Pistons postseason series win until 2026, which would also be against the Magic.

=== Western Conference semifinals ===
==== (1) Los Angeles Lakers vs. (4) Utah Jazz ====
ABC

May 4
1:30 pm

Recap

Utah Jazz 98, Los Angeles Lakers 109
Scoring by quarter: 24–25, 17–29, 31–25, 26–30
Pts: Mehmet Okur 21; Rebs: Mehmet Okur 19; Asts: Deron Williams 9	Pts: Kobe Bryant 38; Rebs: Pau Gasol 10; Asts: Kobe Bryant 7
LA Lakers lead series, 1–0

Staples Center, Los Angeles
Attendance: 18,997
Referees: Jim Clark, Joe Crawford, Ron Garretson

TNT

May 7
7:30 pm

Recap

Utah Jazz 110, Los Angeles Lakers 120
Scoring by quarter: 18–33, 31–30, 34–30, 27–27
Pts: Deron Williams 25; Rebs: Paul Millsap 10; Asts: Deron Williams 10	Pts: Kobe Bryant 34; Rebs: Lamar Odom 16; Asts: Kobe Bryant 6
LA Lakers lead series, 2–0

Staples Center, Los Angeles
Attendance: 18,997
Referees: Tony Brothers, Dan Crawford, Greg Willard

ESPN

May 9
7:00 pm

Recap

Los Angeles Lakers 99, Utah Jazz 104
Scoring by quarter: 23–23, 20–29, 29–27, 27–25
Pts: Kobe Bryant 34; Rebs: Lamar Odom 12; Asts: Kobe Bryant 7	Pts: Carlos Boozer 27; Rebs: Carlos Boozer 20; Asts: Deron Williams 12
LA Lakers lead series, 2–1

EnergySolutions Arena, Salt Lake City
Attendance: 19,911
Referees: Dick Bavetta, Ken Mauer, Monty McCutchen

ABC

May 11
1:30 pm

Recap

Los Angeles Lakers 115, Utah Jazz 123 (OT)
Scoring by quarter: 21–31, 34–24, 20–24, 33–29, Overtime: 7–15
Pts: Kobe Bryant 33; Rebs: Lamar Odom 13; Asts: Kobe Bryant 10	Pts: Deron Williams 29; Rebs: Carlos Boozer 12; Asts: Deron Williams 14
Series tied, 2–2

EnergySolutions Arena, Salt Lake City
Attendance: 19,911
Referees: Sean Corbin, Joe DeRosa, Eddie Rush

TNT

May 14
7:30 pm

Recap

Utah Jazz 104, Los Angeles Lakers 111
Scoring by quarter: 26–29, 28–32, 27–20, 23–30
Pts: Deron Williams 27; Rebs: Mehmet Okur 13; Asts: Deron Williams 10	Pts: Kobe Bryant 26; Rebs: Lamar Odom 11; Asts: Pau Gasol 8
LA Lakers lead series, 3–2

Staples Center, Los Angeles
Attendance: 18,997
Referees: Bob Delaney, Steve Javie, Tom Washington

ESPN

May 16
8:30 pm

Recap

Los Angeles Lakers 108, Utah Jazz 105
Scoring by quarter: 33–20, 29–23, 24–27, 22–35
Pts: Kobe Bryant 34; Rebs: Pau Gasol 13; Asts: Kobe Bryant 6	Pts: Deron Williams 21; Rebs: Carlos Boozer 14; Asts: Deron Williams 14
LA Lakers win series, 4–2

EnergySolutions Arena, Salt Lake City
Attendance: 19,911
Referees: James Capers, Joe Crawford, Scott Foster

Regular-season series
Los Angeles won 3–1 in the regular-season series

November 4, 2007

Recap

Utah Jazz 109, Los Angeles Lakers 119

Staples Center, Los Angeles

November 30, 2007

Recap

Los Angeles Lakers 96, Utah Jazz 120

EnergySolutions Arena, Salt Lake City

December 28, 2007

Recap

Utah Jazz 109, Los Angeles Lakers 123

Staples Center, Los Angeles

March 20, 2008

Recap

Los Angeles Lakers 106, Utah Jazz 95

EnergySolutions Arena, Salt Lake City

This was the fourth playoff meeting between these two teams, with the Jazz winning two of the first three meetings.

Previous playoff series
Utah leads 2–1 in all-time playoff series

1988

Los Angeles Lakers 4, Utah Jazz 3

1988 Western Conference Semifinals

1997

Los Angeles Lakers 1, Utah Jazz 4

1997 Western Conference Semifinals

1998

Los Angeles Lakers 0, Utah Jazz 4

1998 Western Conference Finals

The Lakers took Game 1 in Staples Center, winning by 11 against the Jazz. After being presented with the season's NBA MVP award in Game 2, Kobe Bryant led the Lakers to victory with 34 points, 8 rebounds, and 6 assists. However, as the series shifted back to Utah, the Jazz responded, winning Games 3 and 4 behind the performances of Deron Williams and Carlos Boozer, who bounced back after two poor games in Los Angeles. The Lakers came back with authority as they took Game 5 with Bryant, Pau Gasol, and Lamar Odom scoring 20 plus points each. The Jazz looked to force a Game 7, but the Lakers did not trail and closed out the series in Game 6 with a 108–105 win at Utah, where the Jazz were 37–4 during the regular season. Bryant led the team with 34 points as the Lakers advanced to the Western Conference Finals, which they had not reached since 2004. This was the first playoff meeting between the two teams since the 1998 Western Conference Finals.

==== (2) New Orleans Hornets vs. (3) San Antonio Spurs ====
TNT

May 3
9:00 pm

Recap

San Antonio Spurs 82, New Orleans Hornets 101
Scoring by quarter: 27–23, 22–22, 17–29, 16–27
Pts: Tony Parker 23; Rebs: Ginóbili, Oberto 6 each Asts: Manu Ginóbili 7	Pts: David West 30; Rebs: Tyson Chandler 15; Asts: Chris Paul 13
New Orleans leads series, 1–0

New Orleans Arena, New Orleans, Louisiana
Attendance: 18,040
Referees: Mike Callahan, Marc Davis, Eddie Rush

TNT

May 5
8:30 pm

Recap

San Antonio Spurs 84, New Orleans Hornets 102
Scoring by quarter: 23–22, 20–20, 18–36, 23–24
Pts: Tim Duncan 18; Rebs: Tim Duncan 8 Asts: Manu Ginóbili 7	Pts: Chris Paul 30; Rebs: Tyson Chandler 11; Asts: Chris Paul 12
New Orleans leads series, 2–0

New Orleans Arena, New Orleans, Louisiana
Attendance: 17,927
Referees: Dick Bavetta, Tom Washington, Mark Wunderlich

ESPN

May 8
8:30 pm

Recap

New Orleans Hornets 99, San Antonio Spurs 110
Scoring by quarter: 23–21, 33–33, 22–29, 21–27
Pts: Chris Paul 35; Rebs: David West 12; Asts: Chris Paul 9	Pts: Tony Parker 31; Rebs: Tim Duncan 13; Asts: Tony Parker 11
New Orleans leads series, 2–1

AT&T Center, San Antonio
Attendance: 18,797
Referees: Bob Delaney, Steve Javie, Bill Kennedy

TNT

May 11
7:00 pm

Recap

New Orleans Hornets 80, San Antonio Spurs 100
Scoring by quarter: 22–24, 20–31, 19–30, 19–15
Pts: Chris Paul 23; Rebs: Paul, Armstrong 6 each Asts: Chris Paul 5	Pts: Tim Duncan 22; Rebs: Tim Duncan 15; Asts: Ginóbili, Parker 8 each
Series tied, 2–2

AT&T Center, San Antonio
Attendance: 18,797
Referees: James Capers, Dan Crawford, Ron Garretson

TNT

May 13
8:30 pm

Recap

San Antonio Spurs 79, New Orleans Hornets 101
Scoring by quarter: 23–21, 24–23, 11–28, 21–29
Pts: Manu Ginóbili 20; Rebs: Tim Duncan 23; Asts: Manu Ginóbili 7	Pts: David West 38; Rebs: David West 14; Asts: Chris Paul 14
New Orleans leads series, 3–2

New Orleans Arena, New Orleans, Louisiana
Attendance: 18,246
Referees: Joe Crawford, Joe DeRosa, Joe Forte

ESPN

May 15
8:00 pm

Recap

New Orleans Hornets 80, San Antonio Spurs 99
Scoring by quarter: 24–36, 27–22, 12–20, 17–21
Pts: Chris Paul 21; Rebs: five players 6 each Asts: Chris Paul 8	Pts: Manu Ginóbili 25; Rebs: Tim Duncan 15; Asts: Tim Duncan 6
Series tied, 3–3

AT&T Center, San Antonio
Attendance: 18,797
Referees: Ken Mauer, Monty McCutchen, Bennett Salvatore

TNT

May 19
7:30 pm

Recap

San Antonio Spurs 91, New Orleans Hornets 82
Scoring by quarter: 23–20, 28–22, 20–14, 20–26
Pts: Manu Ginóbili 26; Rebs: Tim Duncan 14; Asts: Parker, Ginóbili 5 each	Pts: David West 20; Rebs: Tyson Chandler 15; Asts: Chris Paul 14
San Antonio wins series, 4–3

New Orleans Arena, New Orleans, Louisiana
Attendance: 18,235
Referees: Dick Bavetta, Scott Foster, Steve Javie

Regular-season series
Tied 2–2 in the regular-season series

November 9, 2007

Recap

San Antonio Spurs 97, New Orleans Hornets 85

New Orleans Arena, New Orleans, Louisiana

January 26, 2008

Recap

New Orleans Hornets 102, San Antonio Spurs 78

AT&T Center, San Antonio

February 23, 2008

Recap

New Orleans Hornets 89, San Antonio Spurs 98

AT&T Center, San Antonio

March 12, 2008

Recap

San Antonio Spurs 75, New Orleans Hornets 100

New Orleans Arena, New Orleans, Louisiana

This was the first playoff meeting between the Spurs and the New Orleans Pelicans/Hornets franchise.

The Hornets, who earned the home-court advantage via winning the Southwest division, were able to gain a quick 2–0 lead over the veteran Spurs. But when the series shifted to San Antonio, the Spurs regained their edge, returning the favor in Games 3 and 4. Game 5 back in New Orleans shocked many as the Hornets played off the home crowd to a 22-point rout. The home teams were clearly dominating in this series as Game 6 was more of the same in San Antonio. However, that all changed when a much anticipated Game 7 saw the Spurs build a 15-point lead after 3 quarters, which proved to be enough (even after the Hornets cut the deficit to 3 with 1:35 left) to send them to another Western Conference Finals. The Spurs were the 4th team to win game 7 on the road after the home team won the first six.

== Conference finals ==
=== Eastern Conference finals ===
==== (1) Boston Celtics vs. (2) Detroit Pistons ====
ESPN

May 20
8:30 pm

Recap

Detroit Pistons 79, Boston Celtics 88
Scoring by quarter: 17–22, 23–19, 17–28, 22–19
Pts: Tayshaun Prince 16; Rebs: Antonio McDyess 11; Asts: Rasheed Wallace 4	Pts: Kevin Garnett 26; Rebs: Kendrick Perkins 10; Asts: Rajon Rondo 7
Boston leads series, 1–0

TD Banknorth Garden, Boston
Attendance: 18,624
Referees: Joe Crawford, Greg Willard, Mark Wunderlich

ESPN

May 22
8:30 pm

Recap

Detroit Pistons 103, Boston Celtics 97
Scoring by quarter: 18–20, 32–23, 28–26, 25–28
Pts: Richard Hamilton 25; Rebs: Rasheed Wallace 10; Asts: Chauncey Billups 7	Pts: Paul Pierce 26; Rebs: Kevin Garnett 13; Asts: Rajon Rondo 8
Series tied, 1–1

TD Banknorth Garden, Boston
Attendance: 18,624
Referees: Sean Corbin, Steve Javie, Tom Washington

ABC

May 24
8:30 pm

Recap

Boston Celtics 94, Detroit Pistons 80
Scoring by quarter: 25–17, 25–15, 23–23, 21–25
Pts: Kevin Garnett 22; Rebs: Kevin Garnett 13; Asts: Ray Allen 6	Pts: Richard Hamilton 26; Rebs: McDyess, Wallace 8 each Asts: Billups, Stuckey 4 each
Boston leads series, 2–1

The Palace of Auburn Hills, Auburn Hills, Michigan
Attendance: 22,076
Referees: Dick Bavetta, Ron Garretson, Monty McCutchen

ESPN

May 26
8:30 pm

Recap

Boston Celtics 75, Detroit Pistons 94
Scoring by quarter: 17–22, 22–21, 19–22, 17–29
Pts: Garnett, Pierce 16 each Rebs: Kevin Garnett 10; Asts: Rajon Rondo 4	Pts: Antonio McDyess 21; Rebs: Antonio McDyess 16; Asts: Billups, Hamilton 7 each
Series tied, 2–2

The Palace of Auburn Hills, Auburn Hills, Michigan
Attendance: 22,076
Referees: Dan Crawford, Bob Delaney, Scott Foster

ESPN

May 28
8:30 pm

Recap

Detroit Pistons 102, Boston Celtics 106
Scoring by quarter: 23–23, 23–29, 25–32, 31–22
Pts: Chauncey Billups 26; Rebs: Billups, McDyess 5 each Asts: Billups, Hamilton 6 each	Pts: Kevin Garnett 33; Rebs: Kendrick Perkins 16; Asts: Rajon Rondo 13
Boston leads series, 3–2

TD Banknorth Garden, Boston
Attendance: 18,624
Referees: Mike Callahan, Ken Mauer, Eddie Rush

ESPN

May 30
8:30 pm

Recap

Boston Celtics 89, Detroit Pistons 81
Scoring by quarter: 24–21, 16–16, 20–31, 29–13
Pts: Paul Pierce 27; Rebs: Paul Pierce 8 Asts: Kevin Garnett 4	Pts: Chauncey Billups 29; Rebs: Rasheed Wallace 10; Asts: Chauncey Billups 6
Boston wins series, 4–2

The Palace of Auburn Hills, Auburn Hills, Michigan
Attendance: 22,076
Referees: Tony Brothers, Joe Derosa, Bennett Salvatore

Regular-season series
Boston won 2–1 in the regular-season series

December 19, 2007

Recap

Detroit Pistons 87, Boston Celtics 85

TD Banknorth Garden, Boston

January 5, 2008

Recap

Boston Celtics 92, Detroit Pistons 85

The Palace of Auburn Hills, Auburn Hills, Michigan

March 5, 2008

Recap

Detroit Pistons 78, Boston Celtics 90

TD Banknorth Garden, Boston

This was the eighth playoff meeting between these two teams, with the Celtics winning four of the first seven meetings.

Previous playoff series
Boston leads 4–3 in all-time playoff series

1968

Boston Celtics 4, Detroit Pistons 2

1968 Eastern Division Semifinals

1985

Boston Celtics 4, Detroit Pistons 2

1985 Eastern Conference Semifinals

1987

Boston Celtics 4, Detroit Pistons 3

1987 Eastern Conference Finals

1988

Boston Celtics 2, Detroit Pistons 4

1988 Eastern Conference Finals

1989

Boston Celtics 0, Detroit Pistons 3

1989 Eastern Conference First Round

1991

Boston Celtics 2, Detroit Pistons 4

1991 Eastern Conference Semifinals

2002

Boston Celtics 4, Detroit Pistons 1

2002 Eastern Conference Semifinals

Detroit walked into the NBA Eastern Conference Finals for the sixth straight season. Boston held off the Pistons in Game 1 88–79, but let Detroit rally a strong performance in Game 2 to win it 103–97 (marking Boston's first home court loss in the post-season). However, they let the Celtics win their first road playoff game 94–80 in Game 3. Game 4 saw the Pistons win 94–75, however they lost Game 5 106–102 despite a scoring run late in the game. In Game 6, the Pistons strolled into the fourth quarter leading 70–60, but a lack of focus, a poor game from Rasheed Wallace, and a rally-destroying turnover by Tayshaun Prince ultimately led to their demise, as the Pistons would end their season losing 89–81. With that, the Celtics moved on to the NBA Finals, and they would face the Los Angeles Lakers for the 11th time.

After game 4 of this series, Detroit lost their next 15 playoff games over the next 17 years, until Game 2 of their 2025 first round series against the New York Knicks.

=== Western Conference finals ===
==== (1) Los Angeles Lakers vs. (3) San Antonio Spurs ====
TNT

May 21
6:00 pm

Recap

San Antonio Spurs 85, Los Angeles Lakers 89
Scoring by quarter: 27–24, 24–19, 21–22, 13–24
Pts: Tim Duncan 30; Rebs: Tim Duncan 18; Asts: Tony Parker 6	Pts: Kobe Bryant 27; Rebs: Lamar Odom 8 Asts: Kobe Bryant 9
LA Lakers lead series, 1–0

Staples Center, Los Angeles
Attendance: 18,997
Referees: Jim Clark, Dan Crawford, Bob Delaney

TNT

May 23
6:00 pm

Recap

San Antonio Spurs 71, Los Angeles Lakers 101
Scoring by quarter: 16–21, 21–25, 20–28, 14–27
Pts: Tony Parker 13; Rebs: Tim Duncan 16; Asts: Parker, Duncan 4 each	Pts: Kobe Bryant 22; Rebs: Lamar Odom 12; Asts: Kobe Bryant 5
LA Lakers lead series, 2–0

Staples Center, Los Angeles
Attendance: 18,997
Referees: Tony Brothers, Ken Mauer, Bennett Salvatore

TNT

May 25
7:30 pm

Recap

Los Angeles Lakers 84, San Antonio Spurs 103
Scoring by quarter: 24–21, 15–28, 18–20, 27–34
Pts: Kobe Bryant 30; Rebs: Lamar Odom 11; Asts: Lamar Odom 6	Pts: Manu Ginóbili 30; Rebs: Tim Duncan 21; Asts: Duncan, Parker 5 each
LA Lakers lead series, 2–1

AT&T Center, San Antonio
Attendance: 18,797
Referees: Mike Callahan, Joe Derosa, Eddie Rush

TNT

May 27
8:00 pm

Recap

Los Angeles Lakers 93, San Antonio Spurs 91
Scoring by quarter: 28–23, 25–24, 24–23, 16–21
Pts: Kobe Bryant 28; Rebs: Bryant, Gasol 10 each Asts: Pau Gasol 6	Pts: Tim Duncan 29; Rebs: Tim Duncan 17; Asts: Tony Parker 9
LA Lakers lead series, 3–1

AT&T Center, San Antonio
Attendance: 18,797
Referees: Joe Crawford, Joe Forte, Mark Wunderlich

TNT

May 29
6:00 pm

Recap

San Antonio Spurs 92, Los Angeles Lakers 100
Scoring by quarter: 28–15, 20–27, 15–22, 29–36
Pts: Tony Parker 23; Rebs: Tim Duncan 15; Asts: Tim Duncan 10	Pts: Kobe Bryant 39; Rebs: Pau Gasol 19; Asts: Pau Gasol 5
LA Lakers win series, 4–1

Staples Center, Los Angeles
Attendance: 18,997
Referees: Steve Javie, Monty McCutchen, Tom Washington

Regular-season series
Tied 2–2 in the regular-season series

November 13, 2007

Recap

Los Angeles Lakers 92, San Antonio Spurs 107

AT&T Center, San Antonio

December 13, 2007

Recap

San Antonio Spurs 97, Los Angeles Lakers 102

Staples Center, Los Angeles

January 23, 2008

Recap

Los Angeles Lakers 91, San Antonio Spurs 103

AT&T Center, San Antonio

April 13, 2008

Recap

San Antonio Spurs 85, Los Angeles Lakers 106

Staples Center, Los Angeles

This was the 11th playoff meeting between these two teams, with the Lakers winning seven of the first ten meetings.

Previous playoff series
Los Angeles leads 7–3 in all-time playoff series

1982

Los Angeles Lakers 4, San Antonio Spurs 0

1982 Western Conference Finals

1983

Los Angeles Lakers 4, San Antonio Spurs 2

1983 Western Conference Finals

1986

Los Angeles Lakers 3, San Antonio Spurs 0

1986 Western Conference First Round

1988

Los Angeles Lakers 3, San Antonio Spurs 0

1988 Western Conference First Round

1995

Los Angeles Lakers 2, San Antonio Spurs 4

1995 Western Conference Semifinals

1999

Los Angeles Lakers 0, San Antonio Spurs 4

1999 Western Conference Semifinals

2001

Los Angeles Lakers 4, San Antonio Spurs 0

2001 Western Conference Finals

2002

Los Angeles Lakers 4, San Antonio Spurs 1

2002 Western Conference Semifinals

2003

Los Angeles Lakers 2, San Antonio Spurs 4

2003 Western Conference Semifinals

2004

Los Angeles Lakers 4, San Antonio Spurs 2

2004 Western Conference Semifinals

The series pitted the two best teams in the Western Conference over the last 10 years. Having home court advantage, the Lakers started out as a favorite and did not disappoint their home crowd as they overcame a 20-point deficit in Game 1 and won behind Kobe Bryant's 27 points, 25 of which were scored in the second half. Game 2 was a cruise for the Lakers as they made a 9–0 run before halftime, led all game and built the lead to 30.

The Spurs easily took Game 3 at home with Manu Ginóbili carrying the Spurs after two terrible games at L.A, making 5 3-pointers and finishing with 30 points; Tony Parker and Tim Duncan added 42 more. In Game 4 the Lakers never trailed (the Spurs missed several opportunities to take the lead) and led comfortably late, but a furious run by the Spurs and several mistakes by the Lakers (Bryant attempting a running fallaway with plenty of time on the shot clock, Gasol missing 2 free throws) gave San Antonio a chance to tie or win with seconds left. On a disputed no-call, Derek Fisher jumped up and collided with Brent Barry, but no foul was called and Barry missed a last second 3. The NBA later ruled that a foul should have been called on Fisher when he collided with Barry.

Heading home up 3–1 in the series, the Lakers trailed in the first quarter by 17, but were able to cut the lead to six by halftime. Again, Bryant stepped up by scoring 17 of his 39 points in the fourth quarter, enabling the Lakers to surge ahead and seal the series, helping them to reach the NBA Finals for the 5th time in 9 seasons and the first time in the post-Shaq era.

The Lakers were able to reach the NBA Finals again as the #1 seed. The last time this happened to the team was during the 1999–2000 season, where they beat the Indiana Pacers 4–2. They also improved to 4–0 against San Antonio in the Western Conference Finals.

== NBA Finals: (W1) Los Angeles Lakers vs. (E1) Boston Celtics ==
ABC

June 5
9:00 pm

Recap

Los Angeles Lakers 88, Boston Celtics 98
Scoring by quarter: 21–23, 30–23, 22–31, 15–21
Pts: Kobe Bryant 24; Rebs: Pau Gasol 8 Asts: Kobe Bryant 6	Pts: Kevin Garnett 24; Rebs: Kevin Garnett 13; Asts: Rajon Rondo 7
Boston leads series, 1–0

TD Banknorth Garden, Boston
Attendance: 18,624
Referees: Dick Bavetta, Scott Foster, Eddie Rush

ABC

June 8
9:00 pm

Recap

Los Angeles Lakers 102, Boston Celtics 108
Scoring by quarter: 22–20, 20–34, 19–29, 41–25
Pts: Kobe Bryant 30; Rebs: Gasol, Radmanović 10 each Asts: Kobe Bryant 8	Pts: Paul Pierce 28; Rebs: Kevin Garnett 14; Asts: Rajon Rondo 16
Boston leads series, 2–0

TD Banknorth Garden, Boston
Attendance: 18,624
Referees: Dan Crawford, Bob Delaney, Ken Mauer

ABC

June 10
6:00 pm

Recap

Boston Celtics 81, Los Angeles Lakers 87
Scoring by quarter: 20–20, 17–23, 25–17, 19–27
Pts: Ray Allen 25; Rebs: Kevin Garnett 12; Asts: Kevin Garnett 5	Pts: Kobe Bryant 36; Rebs: Pau Gasol 12; Asts: Jordan Farmar 5
Boston leads series, 2–1

Staples Center, Los Angeles
Attendance: 18,997
Referees: Joe Crawford, Bennett Salvatore, Mark Wunderlich

ABC

June 12
6:00 pm

Recap

Boston Celtics 97, Los Angeles Lakers 91
Scoring by quarter: 14–35, 26–23, 31–15, 26–18
Pts: Paul Pierce 20; Rebs: Kevin Garnett 11; Asts: Paul Pierce 7	Pts: Lamar Odom 19; Rebs: Gasol, Odom 10 each Asts: Kobe Bryant 10
Boston leads series, 3–1

Staples Center, Los Angeles
Attendance: 18,997
Referees: Joe Derosa, Steve Javie, Tom Washington

ABC

June 15
6:00 pm

Recap

Boston Celtics 98, Los Angeles Lakers 103
Scoring by quarter: 22–39, 30–16, 18–24, 28–24
Pts: Paul Pierce 38; Rebs: Kevin Garnett 14; Asts: Paul Pierce 8	Pts: Kobe Bryant 25; Rebs: Pau Gasol 13; Asts: Pau Gasol 6
Boston leads series, 3–2

Staples Center, Los Angeles
Attendance: 18,997
Referees: Dick Bavetta, Scott Foster, Ken Mauer

ABC

June 17
9:00 pm

Recap

Los Angeles Lakers 92, Boston Celtics 131
Scoring by quarter: 20–24, 15–34, 25–31, 32–42
Pts: Kobe Bryant 22; Rebs: Lamar Odom 10; Asts: Lamar Odom 5	Pts: Garnett, Allen 26 each Rebs: Kevin Garnett 14; Asts: Paul Pierce 10
Boston wins series, 4–2

TD Banknorth Garden, Boston
Attendance: 18,624
Referees: Joe Crawford, Eddie Rush, Bennett Salvatore

Regular-season series
Boston won 2–0 in the regular-season series

November 23, 2007

Recap

Los Angeles Lakers 94, Boston Celtics 107

TD Banknorth Garden, Boston

December 30, 2007

Recap

Boston Celtics 110, Los Angeles Lakers 91

Staples Center, Los Angeles

This was the 11th playoff meeting between these two teams, with the Celtics winning eight of the first ten meetings. Two teams in the same cities, Boston and Los Angeles met in the 2008 ALDS when the Boston Red Sox defeated the Los Angeles Angels in four games.

Previous playoff series
Boston leads 8–2 in all-time playoff series

1959

Boston Celtics 4, Minneapolis Lakers 0

1959 NBA Finals

1962

Boston Celtics 4, Los Angeles Lakers 3

1962 NBA Finals

1963

Boston Celtics 4, Los Angeles Lakers 2

1963 NBA Finals

1965

Boston Celtics 4, Los Angeles Lakers 1

1965 NBA Finals

1966

Boston Celtics 4, Los Angeles Lakers 3

1966 NBA Finals

1968

Boston Celtics 4, Los Angeles Lakers 2

1968 NBA Finals

1969

Boston Celtics 4, Los Angeles Lakers 3

1969 NBA Finals

1984

Boston Celtics 4, Los Angeles Lakers 3

1984 NBA Finals

1985

Boston Celtics 2, Los Angeles Lakers 4

1985 NBA Finals

1987

Boston Celtics 2, Los Angeles Lakers 4

1987 NBA Finals

== Statistic leaders ==
Category	High			Average			
Category	Player	Team	Total	Player	Team	Avg.	Games played
Points	Kobe Bryant	Los Angeles Lakers	49	Kobe Bryant	Los Angeles Lakers	30.1	21
Rebounds	Tim Duncan	San Antonio Spurs	23	Dwight Howard	Orlando Magic	15.8	10
Assists	Chris Paul	New Orleans Hornets	17	Chris Paul	New Orleans Hornets	11.3	12
Steals	Rajon Rondo; Derek Fisher; Kevin Garnett	Boston Celtics; Los Angeles Lakers; Boston Celtics	6	Chris Paul	New Orleans Hornets	2.3	12
Blocks	Dwight Howard	Orlando Magic	8	Dwight Howard	Orlando Magic	3.4	10

== Broadcast notes ==
- The Playoffs began on Saturday April 19, with the Washington Wizards facing the Cleveland Cavaliers on ESPN. ABC kicked off its coverage with the Phoenix Suns facing the San Antonio Spurs. TNT's coverage began with a tripleheader on Sunday, April 20 in a game between the Toronto Raptors and the Orlando Magic, with the Denver Nuggets playing the L.A. Lakers on ABC in between. NBA TV has been broadcasting weeknight coverage of playoff games for at least the first round.
- The Eastern Conference Finals were televised on ABC and ESPN, beginning Tuesday May 20 at 8:30 pm EST. Game 3 was scheduled to be televised on ABC—all other games are scheduled on ESPN. The last possible end date for the Eastern Conference Finals would have been June 1, if the series had ended with the seventh and deciding game.
- The Western Conference Finals were televised on TNT, beginning Wednesday May 21 at 9 pm EST. The last possible end date for the Western Conference Finals would have been June 2, if the series had ended with the seventh and deciding game.
- The NBA Finals were televised on ABC, beginning Thursday June 5 at 9 pm EST. The latest possible end date for the NBA Finals would have been June 19, if the finals had ended with the seventh and deciding game.
- ABC's lead announcing team for the NBA Playoffs (and, by extension, the NBA Finals) was play-by-play man Mike Breen, joined by analysts Mark Jackson and Jeff Van Gundy along with sideline reporter Michele Tafoya. Mike Tirico, Hubie Brown and Lisa Salters were the second team broadcasting on ABC. The latter, with the exception of Salters, were the lead broadcast team for ESPN Radio's NBA coverage, with Jim Durham and Jack Ramsay the secondary broadcast duo.
- ESPN's other play-by-play announcers include Dave Pasch and Dan Shulman, along with analysts Rick Carlisle, Jon Barry and Doris Burke. Sideline reporters include Heather Cox, Holly Rowe and Ric Bucher.
- TNT's lead announcing teams for the NBA Playoffs were Marv Albert with Reggie Miller and Kevin Harlan with Doug Collins. Play-by-play announcers Dick Stockton and Matt Devlin was also teamed with Mike Fratello and Los Angeles Clippers head coach Mike Dunleavy on a rotating basis. Sideline reporters include Craig Sager, Cheryl Miller, Pam Oliver, David Aldridge, Marty Snider, Dei Lynam, and Stephanie Ready.

== Ratings ==
TNT's coverage of the 2008 NBA Playoffs was strong in audience delivery, with the playoff averages showing year-over-year growth among households (+15%), viewers (+14%), adults 18–34 (+25%), adults 18–49 (+22%), adults 25–54 (+24%), men 18–34 (+30%), women 18–34 (+5%), men 18–49 (+23%) and men 25–54 (+22%).
