= Will Bynum =

American basketball player (born 1983)

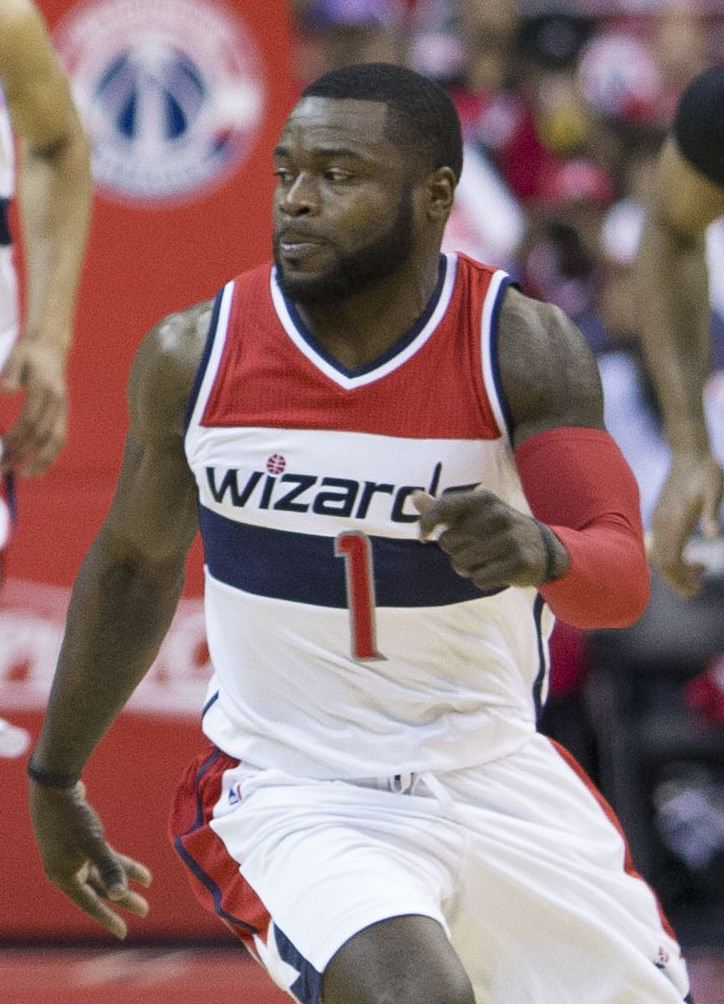
- Bynum with the Washington Wizards in 2015

Birmingham Squadron
- Title: Assistant coach
- League: NBA G League

Personal information
- Born: January 4, 1983 (age 43) Chicago, Illinois, U.S.
- Listed height: 6 ft 0 in (1.83 m)
- Listed weight: 185 lb (84 kg)

Career information
- High school: Crane (Chicago, Illinois)
- College: Arizona (2001–2003); Georgia Tech (2003–2005)
- NBA draft: 2005: undrafted
- Playing career: 2005–2018
- Position: Point guard
- Number: 3, 12, 1
- Coaching career: 2025–present

Career history

Playing
- 2005–2006: Roanoke Dazzle
- 2006: Golden State Warriors
- 2006–2008: Maccabi Tel Aviv
- 2008–2014: Detroit Pistons
- 2014–2016: Guangdong Southern Tigers
- 2015: Washington Wizards
- 2016–2017: Windy City Bulls
- 2018: Yeşilgiresun Belediye

Coaching
- 2025–present: Birmingham Squadron (assistant)

Career highlights
- Ligat HaAl champion (2007); Israeli Basketball Premier League Finals MVP (2007); 2× CBA All-Star (2015, 2016); All-NBA D-League First Team (2006); NBA D-League Rookie of the Year (2006)

Career NBA statistics
- Points: 2,921 (8.1 ppg)
- Rebounds: 561 (1.6 rpg)
- Assists: 1,185 (3.3 apg)
- Stats at NBA.com
- Stats at Basketball Reference

William Bynum (born January 4, 1983) is an American professional basketball coach and former player who is an assistant coach of the Birmingham Squadron of the NBA G League. He played college basketball for the Arizona Wildcats and Georgia Tech Yellow Jackets before going undrafted in the 2005 NBA draft. He was the 2007 Israeli Basketball Premier League Finals MVP.

== High school career ==
Bynum attended Chicago's Crane High School, where he played for coach Anthony Longstreet. As a junior in 1999–2000, he averaged 22.0 points, 4.0 rebounds, and 7.0 assists per game as he led the Cougars to a 20–9 record and helped them advance to the Class AA Elite Eight, going on to earn all-state honors.

On November 14, 2000, Bynum signed a National Letter of Intent to play college basketball for the University of Arizona.

As a senior in 2000–01, Bynum averaged 27.0 points, 6.0 rebounds and 7.0 assists per game as he earned all-city and Chicago Public Player of the Year honors. He was also a Chicago Tribune first-team all-state selection.

In 2001, Will Bynum has featured in the documentary "Preps:Chicago Hoops", a series about five Chicago high school basketball stars making the jump to college or the NBA.

== College career ==
In his freshman season at Arizona 2001–02, Bynum averaged 6.4 points, 1.5 rebounds and 1.4 assists as he posted three straight double-figure scoring efforts twice during the year and finished the year with nine double-figure scoring games. In the summer of 2002, he averaged 12.8 points, 2.8 rebounds and 2.0 assists per game on Arizona's 10-game tour of Australia. He saw action in six contests (three starts) before returning home to Chicago to be with his mother, Rose, who had been in the hospital.

In his sophomore season, Bynum played just eight games for Arizona before deciding to leave the program on January 6, 2003 and subsequently enrolled at Georgia Tech seven days later in order to give his mother a better opportunity to see him play. For the rest of the 2002–03 season, he practiced with the Yellow Jackets and participated in the team's spring strength and conditioning workouts and individual instruction.

Bynum became eligible to play for the Yellow Jackets following the 2003 fall semester exams and went on to play 30 games in 2003–04 while averaging 9.6 points, 2.2 rebounds and 2.5 assists in 20.5 minutes per game as Georgia Tech finished as National Runner-Up. In the National Semifinal against Oklahoma State, with the game tied, Bynum scored with 1.5 seconds remaining to send the Yellow Jackets to the title game. As a senior in 2004–05, he was named to the ACC All-Tournament first team after averaging 20.7 points in three games. He also scored a Georgia Tech ACC Tournament record 35 points in the Yellow Jackets' semi-final victory over North Carolina. For the season, he played 32 games while averaging 12.5 points, 2.5 rebounds, 2.5 assists and 1.0 steals in 27.3 minutes per game.

=== College statistics ===
Year	Team	GP	GS	MPG	FG%	3P%	FT%	RPG	APG	SPG	BPG	PPG
2001–02	Arizona	31	9	18.8	.344	.255	.650	1.5	1.4	.7	.0	6.4
2002–03	Arizona	8	2	16.6	.356	.351	.583	2.8	1.5	.9	.0	7.8
2003–04	Georgia Tech	30	1	20.5	.413	.351	.767	2.2	2.5	.9	.0	9.6
2004–05	Georgia Tech	32	25	27.3	.398	.310	.762	2.5	2.5	1.0	.0	12.5

== Professional career ==
=== Rookie season ===
After going undrafted in the 2005 NBA draft, Bynum joined the Boston Celtics for the 2005 NBA Summer League where in six games, he averaged 4.2 points, 2.7 assists and 2.3 rebounds per game. On August 19, 2005, he signed with the Celtics. However, he was later waived by the Celtics on October 25, 2005. On November 3, 2005, he was selected with the fifth overall pick in the 2005 NBA D-League draft by the Roanoke Dazzle.

On March 17, 2006, Bynum signed a 10-day contract with the Golden State Warriors. On March 27, 2006, he signed a second 10-day contract with the Warriors. Two days later, he was named the 2006 NBA D-League Rookie of the Year. On April 6, 2006, he signed with the Warriors for the rest of the 2005–06 season.

After playing for the Warriors' Summer League team, Bynum was waived by the franchise on July 14, 2006.

=== Israel ===
On September 6, 2006, Bynum signed with Maccabi Tel Aviv of Israel for the 2006–07 season. He went on to help Maccabi win the 2007 Israeli Basketball Premier League championship. In 21 EuroLeague games, he averaged 11.0 points, 2.5 rebounds, 2.6 assists and 1.3 steals per game. He was the 2007 Israeli Basketball Premier League Finals MVP.

Bynum returned to Maccabi for the 2007–08 season and helped them reach the Israeli Cup final, the Israeli Premier League final and the EuroLeague Final. In 24 EuroLeague games, he averaged 10.6 points, 1.9 rebounds, 3.0 assists and 1.2 steals per game.

==== Tel Aviv nightclub incident ====
On January 5, 2008, Bynum hit a 22-year-old man with his car outside a Tel Aviv nightclub and then fled the scene. The man was taken to a hospital with moderate injuries. Bynum was later questioned and taken into custody by police. It was initially alleged that Bynum, who was out celebrating his 25th birthday, hit the man with his vehicle after a brawl in which his brother was stabbed, and other players were attacked as well. The prosecution also claimed he would try to flee the country if released. As a result, a judge extended his remand. He was later released to house arrest.

Bynum's case was eventually closed with no charges after the investigation determined that the collision was not intentional and that his actions were justified. The Tel Aviv district attorney announced: "It was found that Will Bynum was in tangible danger, and under these circumstances, in order to save himself, had to escape immediately by driving his car. Therefore, the advocacy decided the accident took place in circumstances that forced Bynum to protect himself. As a result, he's exempt of criminal responsibility."

=== Detroit Pistons ===
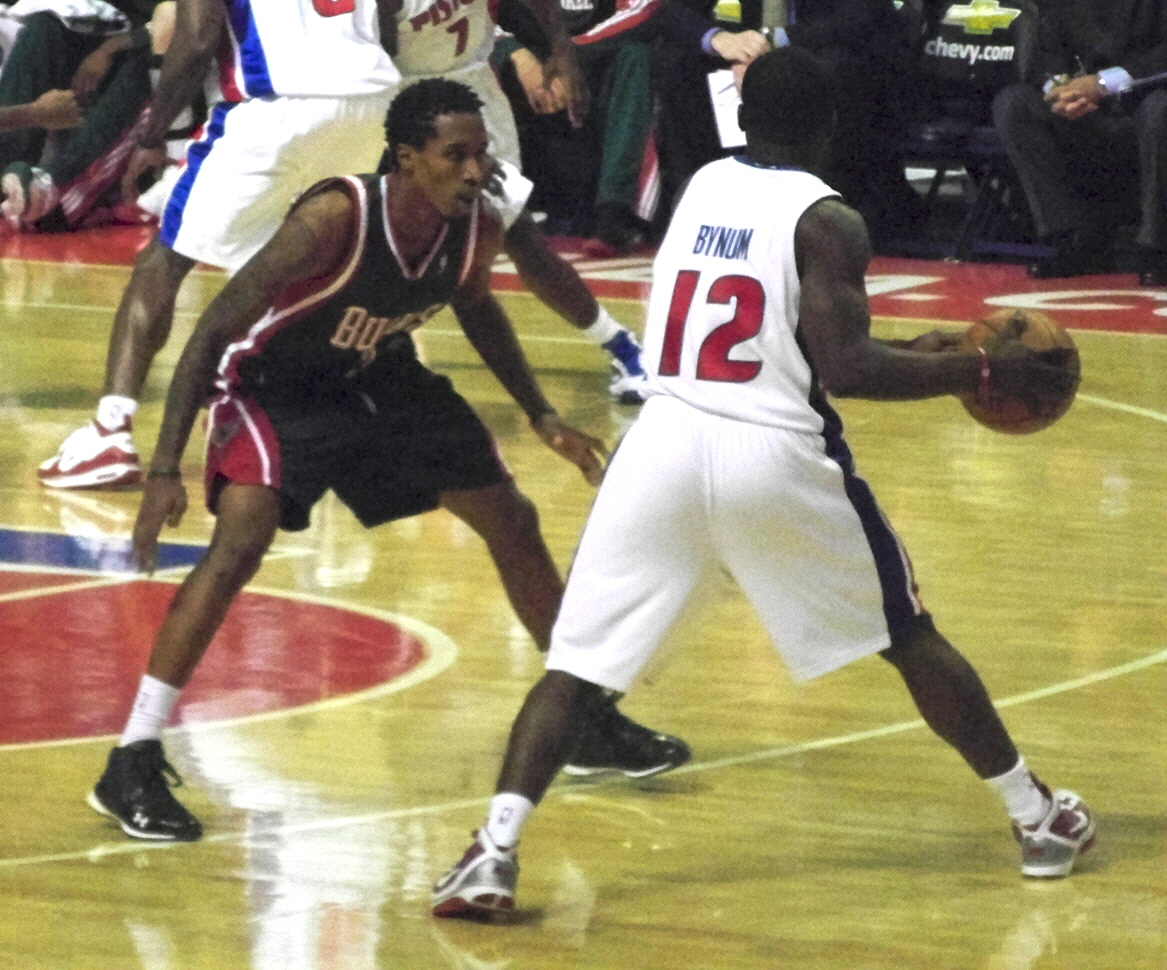
Bynum matching up against Brandon Jennings of the Milwaukee Bucks in December 2009.

Bynum joined the Detroit Pistons for the 2008 NBA Summer League where he averaged 11.8 points, 2.0 rebounds and 3.2 assists in five games. On July 30, 2008, he signed with the Pistons. On April 5, 2009, he scored a franchise-record 26 points in the fourth quarter to lead Detroit to a 104–97 victory over the Charlotte Bobcats. He finished the game with 32 points.

On March 12, 2010, Bynum recorded a career high 20 assists in a 101–87 victory over the Washington Wizards. It marked the first time a Pistons player had 20 or more assists since Isiah Thomas had 21 against Washington on April 12, 1985.

On July 30, 2010, Bynum re-signed with the Pistons on a three-year, $9.75 million deal.

On July 16, 2013, Bynum re-signed with the Pistons on a two-year, $5.75 million contract.

On October 17, 2014, Bynum was traded to the Boston Celtics in exchange for Joel Anthony. Ten days later, he was waived by the Celtics.

=== China ===
On December 5, 2014, Bynum signed with the Guangdong Southern Tigers of the Chinese Basketball Association as an injury replacement for Emmanuel Mudiay. In 30 games for Guangdong, he averaged 22.3 points, 7.1 assists, 3.6 rebounds and 1.5 steals in 32.1 minutes.

=== Washington Wizards ===
On March 27, 2015, Bynum signed a 10-day contract with the Washington Wizards. On April 6, he signed with the Wizards for the rest of the season.

=== Second stint in China ===
In August 2015, Bynum re-signed with the Guangdong Southern Tigers. In 29 games, he averaged 17.8 points, 4.3 rebounds, 6.5 assists and 2.3 steals in 34.4 minutes.

=== Windy City Bulls ===
On September 20, 2016, Bynum signed with the Atlanta Hawks. However, he was waived on October 21 after appearing in seven games. On December 23, he was acquired by the Windy City Bulls. On December 31, he made his debut for Windy City in a 117–106 loss to the Maine Red Claws, recording 20 points, two rebounds, 10 assists and two steals in 36 minutes.

=== Turkey ===
On January 20, 2018, Bynum signed with Turkish club Yeşilgiresun Belediye.

== Career statistics ==
=== NBA ===
Legend
GP	Games played	GS	Games started	MPG	Minutes per game
FG%	Field goal percentage	3P%	3-point field goal percentage	FT%	Free throw percentage
RPG	Rebounds per game	APG	Assists per game	SPG	Steals per game
BPG	Blocks per game	PPG	Points per game	**Bold**	Career high

==== Regular season ====
Year	Team	GP	GS	MPG	FG%	3P%	FT%	RPG	APG	SPG	BPG	PPG
2005–06	Golden State	15	0	10.8	.404	.222	.625	.8	1.3	.5	.0	3.6
2008–09	Detroit	57	1	14.1	.456	.158	.798	1.3	2.8	.6	.0	7.2
2009–10	Detroit	63	**20**	**26.5**	.444	.218	.798	**2.3**	**4.5**	**.9**	**.1**	**10.0**
2010–11	Detroit	61	5	18.4	.448	.320	**.836**	1.2	3.2	**.9**	**.1**	7.9
2011–12	Detroit	36	0	14.3	.381	.241	.766	1.6	1.8	.6	**.1**	5.7
2012–13	Detroit	**65**	0	18.8	**.469**	.316	.809	1.5	3.6	.7	**.1**	9.8
2013–14	Detroit	56	3	18.8	.428	**.323**	.802	1.8	3.9	.7	**.1**	8.7
2014–15	Washington	7	0	9.6	.323	.000	.500	.9	2.6	.1	**.1**	3.1
Career		360	29	18.4	.442	.272	.799	1.6	3.3	.7	.1	8.1

==== Playoffs ====
Year	Team	GP	GS	MPG	FG%	3P%	FT%	RPG	APG	SPG	BPG	PPG
2009	Detroit	**4**	0	**19.5**	.462	.250	**1.000**	**1.5**	**2.5**	**1.3**	.0	**11.8**
2015	Washington	3	0	10.3	**.500**	**.500**	.800	1.0	1.0	.7	**.3**	6.3
Career		7	0	15.6	.472	.333	.933	1.3	1.9	1.0	.1	9.4

=== EuroLeague ===
Legend
GP	Games played	GS	Games started	MPG	Minutes per game
FG%	Field-goal percentage	3P%	3-point field-goal percentage	FT%	Free-throw percentage
RPG	Rebounds per game	APG	Assists per game	SPG	Steals per game
BPG	Blocks per game	PPG	Points per game	PIR	Performance index rating
**Bold**	Career high

Year	Team	GP	GS	MPG	FG%	3P%	FT%	RPG	APG	SPG	BPG	PPG	PIR
2006–07	Maccabi Tel Aviv	21	**20**	**26.7**	.480	.292	**.838**	**2.5**	2.6	**1.3**	**.1**	**11**	8.6
2007–08	Maccabi Tel Aviv	**24**	4	21.5	**.554**	**.357**	.775	1.9	**3**	1.2	**.1**	10.6	**11**
Career		45	24	23.9	.517	.324	.806	2.1	2.8	1.2	.1	10.7	9.8

== Personal life ==
Bynum is the son of William and Rose Robinson, and has eight siblings. His father, a steelworker, died in 2007 from lung cancer and his mother is a diabetic. He and his wife have two daughters; Laila Rose (born 2007) and Aliya Gloria (born 2012).

== Legal issues ==
In November 2023, a jury convicted him of conspiring to make false statements related to NBA players who submitted false dental and medical claims to the NBA Players' Health and Benefit Welfare Plan.

In April 2024, Bynum was sentenced to 18 months in prison.
