= Antonio McDyess =

American basketball player (born 1974)

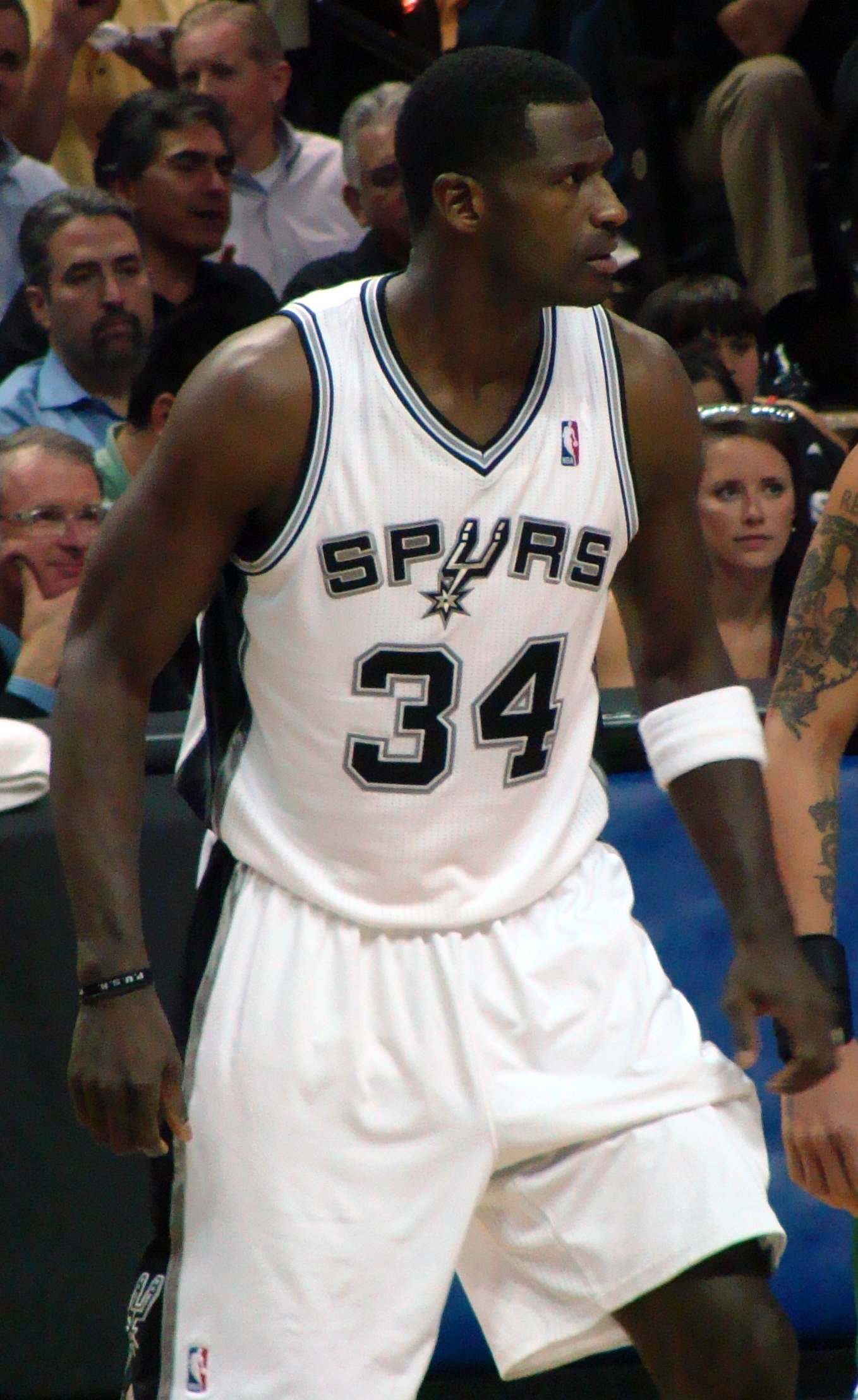
- McDyess with the San Antonio Spurs in 2011

Personal information
- Born: September 7, 1974 (age 52) Quitman, Mississippi, U.S.
- Listed height: 6 ft 9 in (2.06 m)
- Listed weight: 245 lb (111 kg)

Career information
- High school: Quitman (Quitman, Mississippi)
- College: Alabama (1993–1995)
- NBA draft: 1995: 1st round, 2nd overall pick
- Drafted by: Los Angeles Clippers
- Playing career: 1995–2011
- Position: Power forward / center
- Number: 24, 34, 14

Career history
- 1995–1997: Denver Nuggets
- 1997–1998: Phoenix Suns
- 1999–2002: Denver Nuggets
- 2002–2004: New York Knicks
- 2004: Phoenix Suns
- 2004–2009: Detroit Pistons
- 2009–2011: San Antonio Spurs

Career highlights
- NBA All-Star (2001); All-NBA Third Team (1999); NBA All-Rookie First Team (1996); Second-team All-SEC (1995); Second-team Parade All-American (1993)

Career NBA statistics
- Points: 12,227 (12.0 ppg)
- Rebounds: 7,638 (7.5 rpg)
- Blocks: 1,102 (1.1 bpg)
- Stats at NBA.com
- Stats at Basketball Reference
Medals
Men's basketball
Representing United States
Olympic Games
Gold medal – first place	2000 Sydney	Team competition

Antonio Keithflen McDyess (born September 7, 1974) is an American former professional basketball player. Listed at 6 ft 9 in (2.06 m) and 240 pounds (110 kg), McDyess played as a power forward. He played college basketball for the Alabama Crimson Tide.

== Early life ==
McDyess was born at Quitman, Mississippi and attended the University of Alabama. As a prep, McDyess was one of the top 30 players nationally, and made the Magic Johnson Roundball Classic. McDyess played college basketball at the University of Alabama. As a sophomore, he led the Crimson Tide in scoring (13.6) and rebounding (10.0), and was considered the SEC's best big man. He decided to forgo his final two years of college to enter the 1995 NBA draft.

== Playing career ==
McDyess was selected with the second overall pick in the 1995 draft by the Los Angeles Clippers, and was traded to the Denver Nuggets before the season began, along with Randy Woods, for fellow forward Rodney Rogers and a mid-first-round pick that was later used to select Brent Barry. McDyess's explosive leaping and power dunking ability allowed him to average 17.8 points and 8.8 rebounds per game over his first six seasons. In 1997, before his third year, McDyess was traded to the Phoenix Suns. He helped the Suns to a 56–26 record during his lone season in Phoenix.

He became a free agent prior to the lockout-shortened 1998–99 season, and returned to the Nuggets. The move was controversial however, because after he had verbally agreed to return to Denver, he reconsidered an offer to return to Phoenix. According to Sports Illustrated, Jason Kidd, Rex Chapman, and George McCloud flew through a blizzard to Denver in hopes of convincing him to re-sign with the Suns. McDyess was attending a Colorado Avalanche game with Nuggets President and General Manager Dan Issel, and Issel told security to not let the three Suns players into the building. Without any further consultation, he re-signed with the Nuggets. That season, on February 28, 1999, McDyess scored a career-high 46 points and grabbed 19 rebounds in a 116–112 win over the Vancouver Grizzlies.

Considered an up and comer, he was selected to be a part of the gold medal-winning U.S. Olympic men's basketball team at the 2000 Summer Olympics. In 2000–01, McDyess was named an All–Star and became just the third Nugget to average at least 20 points and 10 rebounds for a season, after Issel in 1977–78 and George McGinnis in 1978–79. Near the end of the season, he suffered a partially dislocated left kneecap. Early in the 2001–02 season, McDyess had an injury found during practice in October. An MRI showed a partial tear in his patellar tendon and a mild sprain of the medial collateral ligament. He got surgery for the injury and ended up missing the whole season.

McDyess struggled to play through the injury, re-aggravating it several times and going through additional surgeries over the next few seasons. He was sidelined due to injury for the remainder of the 2001–02 season as well as the entire 2002–03 NBA season.

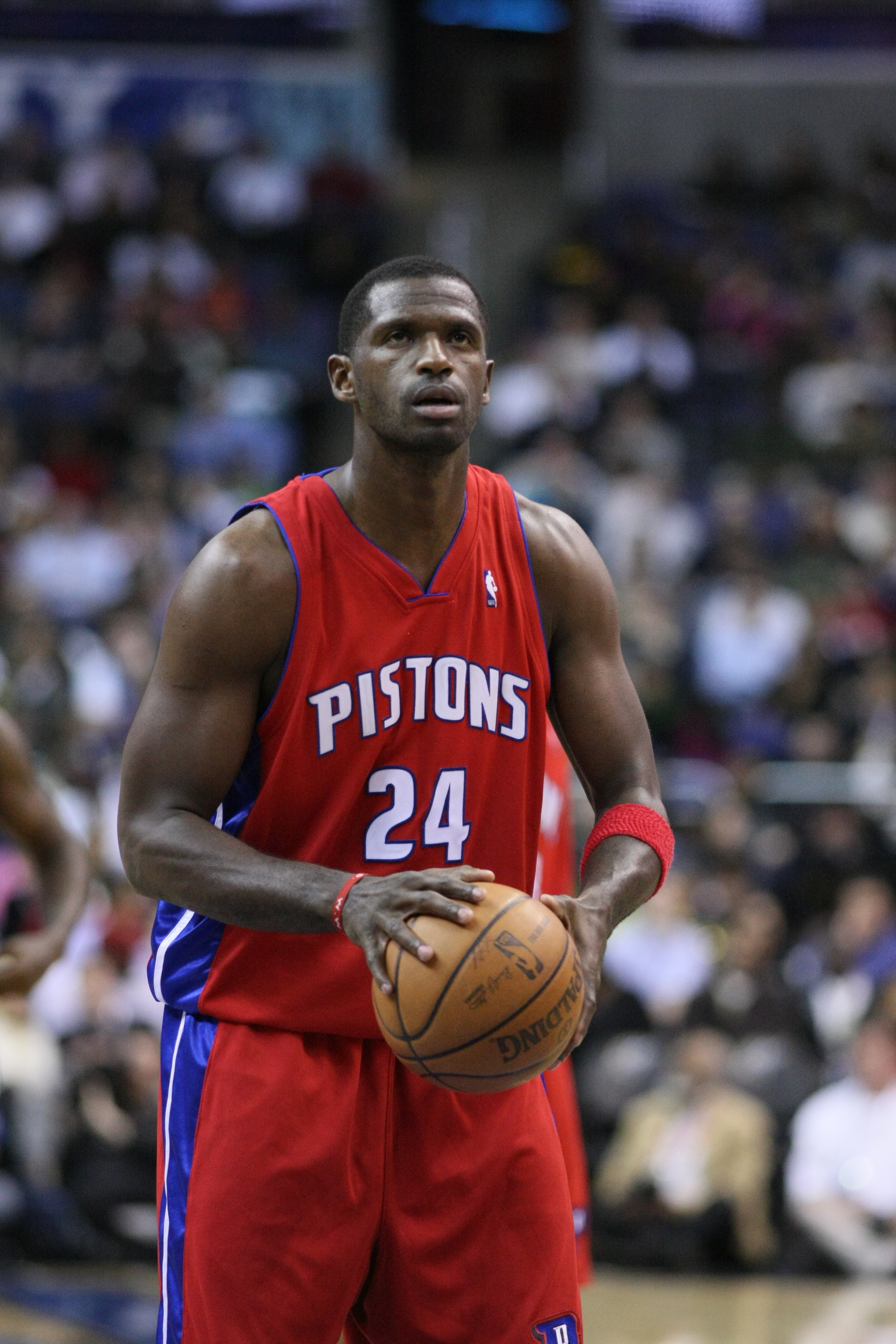
McDyess with the Pistons in 2008

McDyess was traded to the Knicks on June 26, 2002 in exchange for Marcus Camby, Mark Jackson and the draft rights to Nenê, the seventh overall pick in the 2002 NBA draft. McDyess began the 2002–03 season as a highly anticipated addition to the New York Knicks. But on October 8, 2002, with 1 minute 55 seconds left in an exhibition game against Phoenix, McDyess reinjured the knee while dunking a rebound. He would undergo another surgery four days later.

In the 2003–04 season, McDyess was traded to the Phoenix Suns after just 18 games with the Knicks, alongside Maciej Lampe, Charlie Ward, Howard Eisley, the draft rights of Miloš Vujanić and draft considerations in exchange for Stephon Marbury, Penny Hardaway, and Cezary Trybański. He remained healthy while in Phoenix for the remainder of the 2003–04 season. That off-season, his knee was declared healthy and the Detroit Pistons signed him for the full mid-level exception.

As a member of the Pistons, McDyess was successful in reinventing his game. In his first season with the Pistons, averaged 9.6 points and 6.3 rebounds per 23.3 minutes. He relied mostly on mid–range and turn–around jumpers, but remained an efficient scorer, with a 51.3% FG% (ranked 13th in the NBA), helping the Pistons to an Eastern Conference Championship, though they lost to the Spurs in the NBA Finals. He was a dependable sixth man for Detroit, playing in all 82 games in each of the next two seasons. In 2007–08, following the departure of Chris Webber, McDyess became the Pistons' starting power forward.

On November 3, 2008, McDyess was traded to the Denver Nuggets, along with Chauncey Billups and Cheikh Samb, for Allen Iverson. His inclusion in the trade was for salary cap purposes only, and the Nuggets bought out his contract. He waited the league-mandated 30-day period before he could rejoin Detroit, then re-signed with the Pistons on December 9. That postseason, on April 26, 2009, McDyess scored a playoff career-high 26 points, alongside grabbing 10 rebounds, in a deciding Game 4 loss against the Cleveland Cavaliers.

The San Antonio Spurs reached an agreement with McDyess on July 8, 2009, to a three-year deal worth the mid-level exception (up to $15 million). He spent the next two seasons with San Antonio as their starting center, next to Tim Duncan. On January 27, 2010, McDyess scored a season-high 17 points in a 105–90 win over the Atlanta Hawks.

On December 19, 2011, McDyess announced his retirement from the NBA.

== NBA career statistics ==
Legend
GP	Games played	GS	Games started	MPG	Minutes per game
FG%	Field goal percentage	3P%	3-point field goal percentage	FT%	Free throw percentage
RPG	Rebounds per game	APG	Assists per game	SPG	Steals per game
BPG	Blocks per game	PPG	Points per game	**Bold**	Career high
*	Led the league

=== Regular season ===
Year	Team	GP	GS	MPG	FG%	3P%	FT%	RPG	APG	SPG	BPG	PPG
1995–96	Denver	76	75	30.0	.485	.000	.683	7.5	1.0	.7	1.5	13.4
1996–97	Denver	74	73	34.7	.463	**.171**	.708	7.3	1.4	.8	1.7	18.3
1997–98	Phoenix	81	**81**	30.1	.536	.000	.702	7.6	1.3	1.2	1.7	15.1
1998–99	Denver	50*	50*	**38.7**	.471	.111	.680	10.7	1.6	**1.5**	**2.3**	**21.2**
1999–00	Denver	81	**81**	33.3	.507	.000	.626	8.5	2.0	.9	1.7	19.1
2000–01	Denver	70	70	36.5	.495	-	.700	**12.1**	**2.1**	.6	1.5	20.8
2001–02	Denver	10	10	23.6	**.573**	-	**.818**	5.5	1.8	1.0	.8	11.3
2003–04	New York	18	6	23.4	.458	-	.579	6.6	1.1	.7	.6	8.4
2003–04	Phoenix	24	14	21.1	.484	-	.516	5.8	.7	1.0	.5	5.8
2004–05	Detroit	77	8	23.3	.513	.000	.656	6.3	.9	.6	.7	9.6
2005–06	Detroit	**82***	0	21.1	.509	.000	.557	5.3	1.1	.6	.6	7.8
2006–07	Detroit	**82***	3	21.1	.526	-	.691	6.0	.9	.7	.8	8.1
2007–08	Detroit	78	78	29.3	.488	.000	.622	8.5	1.1	.8	.7	8.8
2008–09	Detroit	62	30	30.1	.510	-	.698	9.8	1.3	.7	.8	9.6
2009–10	San Antonio	77	50	21.0	.479	.000	.632	5.9	1.1	.6	.4	5.8
2010–11	San Antonio	73	16	19.0	.491	.000	.675	5.4	1.2	.5	.5	5.3
Career		1015	645	27.6	.497	.117	.670	7.5	1.3	.8	1.1	12.0
All-Star		1	0	15.0	.444	.000	.000	8.0	2.0	1.0	.0	8.0

=== Playoffs ===
Year	Team	GP	GS	MPG	FG%	3P%	FT%	RPG	APG	SPG	BPG	PPG
1998	Phoenix	4	4	**36.8**	.477	-	.643	**13.3**	1.0	.5	**1.5**	**17.8**
2005	Detroit	**25**	0	19.8	.486	-	.694	5.9	.8	.6	.9	8.0
2006	Detroit	18	0	20.6	**.559**	.000	.548	6.1	.6	.4	.7	7.6
2007	Detroit	16	0	22.1	.349	.000	.731	7.1	1.1	**.7**	.9	5.8
2008	Detroit	17	**11**	27.5	.538	-	.821	7.4	.9	.6	.5	8.9
2009	Detroit	4	4	34.0	.523	-	**1.000**	8.5	.5	.5	.8	13.0
2010	San Antonio	10	10	24.7	.532	-	**1.000**	6.8	1.2	.2	.7	6.8
2011	San Antonio	6	6	24.2	.417	-	.571	5.0	**1.3**	.3	.8	5.7
Career		100	35	23.6	.487	.000	.689	6.8	.9	.5	.8	8.1
