= 2008–09 Detroit Pistons season =

- Head coach: Michael Curry
- President: Joe Dumars
- General manager: Joe Dumars
- Owners: Bill Davidson (through March 13, 2009); Karen Davidson (after March 13, 2009)
- Arena: The Palace of Auburn Hills

Results
- Record: 39–43 (.476)
- Place: Division: 3rd (Central); Conference: 8th (Eastern)
- Playoff finish: First Round (lost to Cavaliers 0–4)
- Stats at Basketball Reference

Local media
- Television: Fox Sports Detroit
- Radio: WXYT-FM

The 2008–09 Detroit Pistons season was the 68th season of the franchise, the 61st in the National Basketball Association (NBA), and the 52nd in the Detroit area. The season was the first under new head coach Michael Curry, who took over for Flip Saunders who was fired at the conclusion of the 2007–08 season.

In the playoffs, the Pistons were swept by the Cleveland Cavaliers in four games in the first round.

During the season, the Pistons traded Chauncey Billups, Antonio McDyess and Cheikh Samb to the Denver Nuggets in exchange for Allen Iverson. McDyess was waived by the Nuggets and was re-signed by the Pistons. It was their first losing season since 2000–01, and the first time they did not reach the Eastern Conference finals since 2001–02. The 2008–09 season was also the last time the Pistons qualified for the playoffs, until 2015–16 where they were also swept by the Cavaliers and again in the first round. Following the season, Rasheed Wallace signed as a free agent with the Boston Celtics, Iverson left to sign with the Memphis Grizzlies, McDyess signed with the San Antonio Spurs, and Curry was fired.

== Draft picks ==
Round	Pick	Player	Position	Nationality	College
1	29	D. J. White (traded to Seattle)	PF	United States	Indiana
2	59	Deron Washington	SG/SF	United States	Virginia Tech

On the day of the draft, the Pistons traded D. J. White to the Seattle SuperSonics in exchange for the rights to Seattle's number 32 and number 46 picks. The picks were used to select Walter Sharpe from Alabama–Birmingham and Trent Plaisted from Brigham Young, respectively.

== Roster ==
2008–09 Detroit Pistons roster
Players

Pos.	No.	Player	Height	Weight	DOB	From
SG	28	Arron Afflalo	6 ft 5 in (1.96 m)	215 lb (98 kg)	1985-10-15	UCLA
C	38	Kwame Brown	6 ft 11 in (2.11 m)	270 lb (122 kg)	1982-03-10	Glynn Academy HS (GA)
PG	12	Will Bynum	6 ft 0 in (1.83 m)	185 lb (84 kg)	1983-01-04	Georgia Tech
SG	32	Richard Hamilton	6 ft 6 in (1.98 m)	185 lb (84 kg)	1978-02-14	Connecticut
SF	5	Walter Herrmann	6 ft 9 in (2.06 m)	225 lb (102 kg)	1979-06-26	Argentina
PG	1	Allen Iverson (injured)	6 ft 0 in (1.83 m)	165 lb (75 kg)	1975-06-07	Georgetown
PF	25	Amir Johnson	6 ft 9 in (2.06 m)	210 lb (95 kg)	1987-05-01	Westchester HS (CA)
C	54	Jason Maxiell	6 ft 7 in (2.01 m)	260 lb (118 kg)	1983-02-18	Cincinnati
PF	24	Antonio McDyess	6 ft 9 in (2.06 m)	220 lb (100 kg)	1974-09-07	Alabama
SF	22	Tayshaun Prince	6 ft 9 in (2.06 m)	215 lb (98 kg)	1980-02-28	Kentucky
PF	42	Walter Sharpe (DL)	6 ft 9 in (2.06 m)	245 lb (111 kg)	1986-07-18	UAB
PG	3	Rodney Stuckey	6 ft 5 in (1.96 m)	205 lb (93 kg)	1986-04-21	Eastern Washington
C	30	Rasheed Wallace	6 ft 10 in (2.08 m)	225 lb (102 kg)	1974-09-17	North Carolina

Coaches
Head coach
- Michael Curry
Assistant(s)
- Dave Cowens
- Harold Ellis
- Bill Pope
- Par Sullivan
- Darrell Walker

Legend
- (DP) Unsigned draft pick
- (FA) Free agent
- (S) Suspended
- (DL) On assignment to D-League affiliate
- Injured

Roster
Updated: February 16, 2009

== Regular season ==
=== Standings ===
Central Division	W	L	PCT	GB	Home	Road	Div	GP
z-Cleveland Cavaliers	66	16	.805	—	39–2	27–14	13–3	82
x-Chicago Bulls	41	41	.500	25	28–13	13–28	9–7	82
x-Detroit Pistons	39	43	.476	27	21–20	18–23	7–9	82
Indiana Pacers	36	46	.439	30	25–16	11–30	7–9	82
Milwaukee Bucks	34	48	.415	32	22–19	12–29	4–12	82

#	Eastern Conference				
#	Team	W	L	PCT	GB
1	z-Cleveland Cavaliers	66	16	.805	—
2	y-Boston Celtics	62	20	.756	4
3	y-Orlando Magic	59	23	.720	7
4	x-Atlanta Hawks	47	35	.573	19
5	x-Miami Heat	43	39	.524	23
6	x-Philadelphia 76ers	41	41	.500	25
7	x-Chicago Bulls	41	41	.500	25
8	x-Detroit Pistons	39	43	.476	27
9	Indiana Pacers	36	46	.439	30
10	Charlotte Bobcats	35	47	.427	31
11	New Jersey Nets	34	48	.415	32
12	Milwaukee Bucks	34	48	.415	32
13	Toronto Raptors	33	49	.402	33
14	New York Knicks	32	50	.390	34
15	Washington Wizards	19	63	.232	47

=== Game log ===
2008–09 game log
October: 1–0 (home: 1–0; road: 0–0)

Game	Date	Team	Score	High points	High rebounds	High assists	Location Attendance	Record
1	October 29	Indiana	W 100–94	Tayshaun Prince (19)	Rasheed Wallace (7)	Chauncey Billups (7)	The Palace of Auburn Hills; 22,076	1–0

November: 9–6 (home: 4–3; road: 5–3)

Game	Date	Team	Score	High points	High rebounds	High assists	Location Attendance	Record
2	November 1	Washington	W 117–109	Richard Hamilton (24)	Rasheed Wallace (12)	Chauncey Billups (8)	The Palace of Auburn Hills; 22,076	2–0
3	November 3	@ Charlotte	W 101–83	Richard Hamilton (19)	Kwame Brown (9)	Richard Hamilton (5)	Time Warner Cable Arena; 11,023	3–0
4	November 5	@ Toronto	W 100–93	Tayshaun Prince (27)	Rasheed Wallace (12)	Richard Hamilton, Rodney Stuckey (5)	Air Canada Centre; 18,602	4–0
5	November 7	@ New Jersey	L 96–103	Allen Iverson (24)	Tayshaun Prince (11)	Allen Iverson, Rodney Stuckey (6)	Izod Center; 17,767	4–1
6	November 9	Boston	L 76–88	Tayshaun Prince (23)	Rasheed Wallace (11)	Allen Iverson (4)	The Palace of Auburn Hills; 22,076	4–2
7	November 11	@ Sacramento	W 100–92	Allen Iverson (30)	Tayshaun Prince (11)	Allen Iverson (9)	ARCO Arena; 11,423	5–2
8	November 13	@ Golden State	W 107–102	Richard Hamilton (24)	Tayshaun Prince (16)	Allen Iverson (9)	Oracle Arena; 18,477	6–2
9	November 14	@ L.A. Lakers	W 106–95	Allen Iverson, Rasheed Wallace (25)	Rasheed Wallace (13)	Tayshaun Prince (6)	Staples Center; 18,997	7–2
10	November 16	@ Phoenix	L 86–104	Richard Hamilton (19)	Rasheed Wallace (9)	Allen Iverson (7)	US Airways Center; 18,422	7–3
11	November 19	Cleveland	W 96–89	Allen Iverson (23)	Rasheed Wallace (15)	Richard Hamilton (5)	The Palace of Auburn Hills; 22,076	8–3
12	November 20	@ Boston	L 80–98	Allen Iverson (16)	Kwame Brown, Tayshaun Prince (7)	Allen Iverson (4)	TD Banknorth Garden; 18,624	8–4
13	November 23	Minnesota	L 80–106	Tayshaun Prince (20)	Rasheed Wallace (10)	Will Bynum, Richard Hamilton (6)	The Palace of Auburn Hills; 22,076	8–5
14	November 26	New York	W 110–96	Richard Hamilton (17)	Amir Johnson (13)	Rodney Stuckey (11)	The Palace of Auburn Hills; 22,076	9–5
15	November 28	Milwaukee	W 107–97	Allen Iverson (17)	Jason Maxiell (8)	Allen Iverson (7)	The Palace of Auburn Hills; 22,076	10–5
16	November 30	Portland	L 85–96	Richard Hamilton (18)	Amir Johnson (8)	Rodney Stuckey (5)	The Palace of Auburn Hills; 22,076	10–6

December: 9–5 (home: 6–2; road: 3–3)

Game	Date	Team	Score	High points	High rebounds	High assists	Location Attendance	Record
17	December 2	@ San Antonio	W 89–77	Allen Iverson, Rasheed Wallace (19)	Tayshaun Prince (12)	Rodney Stuckey (7)	AT&T Center; 17,582	11–6
18	December 5	Philadelphia	L 91–96	Richard Hamilton (19)	Rasheed Wallace, Kwame Brown (8)	Allen Iverson (7)	The Palace of Auburn Hills; 22,076	11–7
19	December 7	@ New York	L 92–104	Tayshaun Prince (23)	Tayshaun Prince (10)	Allen Iverson (7)	Madison Square Garden; 19,763	11–8
20	December 9	@ Washington	L 94–107	Richard Hamilton (29)	Tayshaun Prince (11)	Rodney Stuckey (11)	Verizon Center; 14,707	11–9
21	December 12	Indiana	W 114–110	Richard Hamilton (28)	Rasheed Wallace (6)	Allen Iverson (12)	The Palace of Auburn Hills; 22,076	12–9
22	December 13	@ Charlotte	W 90–86	Allen Iverson (20)	Tayshaun Prince, Antonio McDyess (6)	Rodney Stuckey (10)	Time Warner Cable Arena; 17,373	13–9
23	December 17	Washington	W 88–74	Allen Iverson (28)	Tayshaun Prince (10)	Rodney Stuckey (11)	The Palace of Auburn Hills; 22,076	14–9
24	December 19	Utah	L 114–120 (2OT)	Allen Iverson (38)	Rasheed Wallace (8)	Allen Iverson (7)	The Palace of Auburn Hills; 22,076	14–10
25	December 21	@ Atlanta	L 78–85	Rasheed Wallace, Rodney Stuckey (20)	Rodney Stuckey (9)	Allen Iverson (6)	Philips Arena; 15,233	14–11
26	December 23	Chicago	W 104–98	Rodney Stuckey (40)	Tayshaun Prince, Antonio McDyess (11)	Allen Iverson (8)	The Palace of Auburn Hills; 22,076	15–11
27	December 26	Oklahoma City	W 90–88	Allen Iverson (22)	Tayshaun Prince (11)	Rodney Stuckey, Richard Hamilton (4)	The Palace of Auburn Hills; 22,076	16–11
28	December 27	@ Milwaukee	W 87–76	Tayshaun Prince (19)	Rasheed Wallace (12)	Rodney Stuckey, Allen Iverson (6)	Bradley Center; 17,086	17–11
29	December 29	Orlando	W 88–82	Rodney Stuckey (19)	Antonio McDyess (8)	Antonio McDyess (5)	The Palace of Auburn Hills; 22,076	18–11
30	December 31	New Jersey	W 83–75	Allen Iverson (19)	Jason Maxiell (9)	Tayshaun Prince (5)	The Palace of Auburn Hills; 22,076	19–11

January: 6–9 (home: 2–5; road: 4–4)

Game	Date	Team	Score	High points	High rebounds	High assists	Location Attendance	Record
31	January 2	Sacramento	W 98–92	Rodney Stuckey (38)	Amir Johnson (14)	Rodney Stuckey (7)	The Palace of Auburn Hills; 22,076	20–11
32	January 4	@ L.A. Clippers	W 88–87	Rodney Stuckey (24)	Antonio McDyess (15)	Allen Iverson (10)	Staples Center; 17,968	21–11
33	January 7	@ Portland	L 83–84	Tayshaun Prince (26)	Antonio McDyess (13)	Allen Iverson, Rodney Stuckey (7)	Rose Garden; 20,644	21–12
34	January 9	@ Denver	W 93–90	Allen Iverson (23)	Antonio McDyess (12)	Tayshaun Prince (4)	Pepsi Center; 19,682	22–12
35	January 10	@ Utah	L 82–99	Rodney Stuckey (19)	Antonio McDyess (9)	Allen Iverson (5)	EnergySolutions Arena; 19,911	22–13
36	January 13	Charlotte	L 78–80	Rodney Stuckey (22)	Tayshaun Prince, Antonio McDyess (9)	Rodney Stuckey, Allen Iverson, Tayshaun Prince (5)	The Palace of Auburn Hills; 22,076	22–14
37	January 14	@ Indiana	L 106–110 (OT)	Rodney Stuckey (30)	Rasheed Wallace (15)	Allen Iverson (7)	Conseco Fieldhouse; 11,964	22–15
38	January 16	@ Oklahoma City	L 79–89	Tayshaun Prince, Richard Hamilton (18)	Rasheed Wallace (8)	Richard Hamilton (5)	Ford Center; 19,136	22–16
39	January 17	New Orleans	L 85–91	Richard Hamilton (19)	Antonio McDyess (12)	Rodney Stuckey (6)	The Palace of Auburn Hills; 22,076	22–17
40	January 19	@ Memphis	W 87–79	Allen Iverson (27)	Antonio McDyess (16)	Richard Hamilton (6)	FedExForum; 17,483	23–17
41	January 21	Toronto	W 95–76	Tayshaun Prince (25)	Jason Maxiell (11)	Rodney Stuckey (7)	The Palace of Auburn Hills; 22,076	24–17
42	January 23	Dallas	L 91–112	Richard Hamilton (17)	Rasheed Wallace (9)	Will Bynum (4)	The Palace of Auburn Hills; 22,076	24–18
43	January 25	Houston	L 105–108	Richard Hamilton (27)	Rasheed Wallace (11)	Rodney Stuckey, Allen Iverson (8)	The Palace of Auburn Hills; 22,076	24–19
44	January 28	@ Minnesota	W 98–89	Rasheed Wallace (25)	Rasheed Wallace, Antonio McDyess (10)	Rodney Stuckey (6)	Target Center; 14,232	25–19
45	January 30	Boston	L 78–86	Allen Iverson, Rodney Stuckey (19)	Antonio McDyess (14)	Richard Hamilton (5)	The Palace of Auburn Hills; 22,076	25–20

February: 3–9 (home: 1–5; road: 2–4)

Game	Date	Team	Score	High points	High rebounds	High assists	Location Attendance	Record
46	February 1	Cleveland	L 80–90	Allen Iverson (22)	Amir Johnson (9)	Rodney Stuckey (8)	The Palace of Auburn Hills; 22,076	25–21
47	February 4	Miami	W 93–90	Rasheed Wallace, Rodney Stuckey (18)	Antonio McDyess (17)	Richard Hamilton (7)	The Palace of Auburn Hills; 21,720	26–21
48	February 7	@ Milwaukee	W 126–121 (OT)	Richard Hamilton (38)	Tayshaun Prince (13)	Allen Iverson, Tayshaun Prince (9)	Bradley Center; 17,297	27–21
49	February 8	Phoenix	L 97–107	Richard Hamilton (27)	Antonio McDyess (13)	Allen Iverson (7)	The Palace of Auburn Hills; 22,076	27–22
50	February 10	@ Chicago	L 102–107	Richard Hamilton (30)	Rasheed Wallace (10)	Richard Hamilton (8)	United Center; 21,896	27–23
51	February 11	Atlanta	L 95–99	Allen Iverson (28)	Antonio McDyess (10)	Tayshaun Prince (8)	The Palace of Auburn Hills; 20,124	27–24
52	February 17	Milwaukee	L 86–92	Antonio McDyess (24)	Antonio McDyess (14)	Allen Iverson, Tayshaun Prince (8)	The Palace of Auburn Hills; 20,217	27–25
53	February 19	San Antonio	L 79–83	Allen Iverson (31)	Antonio McDyess (13)	Rodney Stuckey (8)	The Palace of Auburn Hills; 22,076	27–26
54	February 22	@ Cleveland	L 78–99	Allen Iverson (14)	Jason Maxiell (9)	Richard Hamilton (6)	Quicken Loans Arena; 20,562	27–27
55	February 24	@ Miami	L 91–103	Allen Iverson (22)	Tayshaun Prince (9)	Tayshaun Prince (8)	American Airlines Arena; 19,600	27–28
56	February 25	@ New Orleans	L 87–90	Richard Hamilton (24)	Antonio McDyess, Jason Maxiell (9)	Richard Hamilton, Will Bynum (6)	New Orleans Arena; 17,215	27–29
57	February 27	@ Orlando	W 93–85	Richard Hamilton (31)	Antonio McDyess (13)	Richard Hamilton (6)	Amway Arena; 17,461	28–29

March: 8–9 (home: 5–4; road: 3–5)

Game	Date	Team	Score	High points	High rebounds	High assists	Location Attendance	Record
58	March 1	@ Boston	W 105–95	Richard Hamilton (25)	Tayshaun Prince (8)	Richard Hamilton (9)	TD Banknorth Garden; 18,624	29–29
59	March 3	Denver	W 100–95	Tayshaun Prince (23)	Antonio McDyess (12)	Richard Hamilton (7)	The Palace of Auburn Hills; 22,076	30–29
60	March 6	Golden State	W 108–91	Richard Hamilton (22)	Jason Maxiell (9)	Rodney Stuckey (8)	The Palace of Auburn Hills; 22,076	31–29
61	March 7	@ Atlanta	L 83–87	Richard Hamilton (20)	Antonio McDyess (12)	Rodney Stuckey (6)	Philips Arena; 19,101	31–30
62	March 9	Orlando	W 98–94	Richard Hamilton (29)	Antonio McDyess (18)	Richard Hamilton (14)	The Palace of Auburn Hills; 20,039	32–30
63	March 11	New York	L 111–116 (OT)	Richard Hamilton (27)	Antonio McDyess (22)	Rodney Stuckey (8)	The Palace of Auburn Hills; 20,135	32–31
64	March 13	@ Toronto	W 99–95 (OT)	Richard Hamilton (24)	Antonio McDyess (13)	Richard Hamilton (16)	Air Canada Centre; 19,800	33–31
65	March 15	Memphis	L 84–89	Antonio McDyess (19)	Kwame Brown (13)	Richard Hamilton (12)	The Palace of Auburn Hills; 22,076	33–32
66	March 17	@ Dallas	L 101–103	Tayshaun Prince (28)	Antonio McDyess, Jason Maxiell (9)	Rodney Stuckey (7)	American Airlines Center; 20,427	33–33
67	March 18	@ Houston	L 101–106 (2OT)	Arron Afflalo (24)	Antonio McDyess (20)	Rodney Stuckey (10)	Toyota Center; 18,275	33–34
68	March 20	L.A. Clippers	W 108–90	Antonio McDyess (24)	Antonio McDyess (17)	Tayshaun Prince (12)	The Palace of Auburn Hills; 22,076	34–34
69	March 22	Miami	L 96–101	Rodney Stuckey (24)	Antonio McDyess (12)	Tayshaun Prince (5)	The Palace of Auburn Hills; 22,076	34–35
70	March 24	@ Chicago	L 91–99	Will Bynum, Tayshaun Prince (20)	Kwame Brown (11)	Will Bynum (9)	United Center; 20,502	34–36
71	March 26	L.A. Lakers	L 77–92	Will Bynum (25)	Antonio McDyess (12)	Will Bynum (11)	The Palace of Auburn Hills; 22,076	34–37
72	March 28	@ Washington	W 98–96	Richard Hamilton (31)	Antonio McDyess, Kwame Brown (11)	Rodney Stuckey (6)	Verizon Center; 20,173	35–37
73	March 29	Philadelphia	W 101–97	Tayshaun Prince (21)	Antonio McDyess (6)	Richard Hamilton (7)	The Palace of Auburn Hills; 22,076	36–37
74	March 31	@ Cleveland	L 73–79	Richard Hamilton (13)	Antonio McDyess (10)	Will Bynum (3)	Quicken Loans Arena; 20,562	36–38

April : 3–5 (home: 2–1; road: 1–4)

Game	Date	Team	Score	High points	High rebounds	High assists	Location Attendance	Record
75	April 1	@ New Jersey	L 98–111	Richard Hamilton (29)	Rodney Stuckey, Antonio McDyess (7)	Rodney Stuckey, Richard Hamilton (6)	Izod Center; 15,105	36–39
76	April 4	@ Philadelphia	L 90–95	Rodney Stuckey (23)	Kwame Brown (7)	Rodney Stuckey, Richard Hamilton (4)	Wachovia Center; 19,832	36–40
77	April 5	Charlotte	W 104–97	Will Bynum (32)	Antonio McDyess, Kwame Brown (9)	Will Bynum (7)	The Palace of Auburn Hills; 22,076	37–40
78	April 8	@ New York	W 113–86	Richard Hamilton (22)	Antonio McDyess (16)	Richard Hamilton, Rodney Stuckey (7)	Madison Square Garden; 19,763	38–40
79	April 10	New Jersey	W 100–93	Will Bynum (20)	Kwame Brown (7)	Richard Hamilton (9)	The Palace of Auburn Hills; 22,076	39–40
80	April 11	@ Indiana	L 102–106	Richard Hamilton (23)	Antonio McDyess (15)	Will Bynum (6)	Conseco Fieldhouse; 17,116	39–41
81	April 13	Chicago	L 88–91	Richard Hamilton (25)	Antonio McDyess (10)	Rodney Stuckey (9)	The Palace of Auburn Hills; 22,076	39–42
82	April 15	@ Miami	L 96–102 (OT)	Kwame Brown (17)	Kwame Brown (13)	Rodney Stuckey (5)	American Airlines Arena; 19,600	39–43

2015–16 season schedule

== Playoffs ==
=== Game log ===
2009 playoff game log
First Round: 0–4 (home: 0–2; road: 0–2)

Game	Date	Team	Score	High points	High rebounds	High assists	Location Attendance	Record
1	April 18	@ Cleveland	L 82–104	Rodney Stuckey (20)	Brown, Wallace (9)	Hamilton, Stuckey (4)	Quicken Loans Arena; 20,562	0–1
2	April 21	@ Cleveland	L 82–94	Richard Hamilton (17)	Antonio McDyess (11)	Rodney Stuckey (6)	Quicken Loans Arena; 20,562	0–2
3	April 24	Cleveland	L 68–79	Richard Hamilton (15)	McDyess, Hamilton (8)	Richard Hamilton (6)	The Palace of Auburn Hills; 22,076	0–3
4	April 26	Cleveland	L 78–99	Antonio McDyess (26)	Antonio McDyess (10)	Richard Hamilton (7)	The Palace of Auburn Hills; 22,076	0–4

2016 playoff schedule

=== Trades ===
June 26, 2008	To Detroit Pistons Draft rights to both Trent Plaisted and Walter Sharpe	To Seattle SuperSonics Draft rights to D. J. White
November 3, 2008	To Detroit Pistons Allen Iverson	To Denver Nuggets Chauncey Billups, Antonio McDyess and Cheikh Samb

=== Free agents ===
==== Additions ====
Player	Signed	Former team
Kwame Brown	July 28, 2008	Memphis Grizzlies

==== Subtractions ====
Player	Left	New team
Juan Dixon		Washington Wizards
Jarvis Hayes		New Jersey Nets
Lindsey Hunter		Chicago Bulls
Theo Ratliff		Philadelphia 76ers

== Player statistics ==
Legend
GP	Games played	GS	Games started	MPG	Minutes per game
FG%	Field-goal percentage	3P%	3-point field-goal percentage	FT%	Free-throw percentage
RPG	Rebounds per game	APG	Assists per game	SPG	Steals per game
BPG	Blocks per game	PPG	Points per game

=== Regular season ===
Player	GP	GS	MPG	FG%	3P%	FT%	RPG	APG	SPG	BPG	PPG
Tayshaun Prince	82	82	37.3	.450	.397	.778	5.8	3.1	.5	.6	14.2
Rodney Stuckey	79	65	31.9	.439	.295	.803	3.5	4.9	1.0	.1	13.4
Jason Maxiell	78	4	18.1	.575	.000	.532	4.2	.3	.3	.8	5.8
Arron Afflalo	74	8	16.7	.437	.402	.817	1.8	.6	.4	.2	4.9
Richard Hamilton	67	51	34.0	.447	.368	.848	3.1	4.4	.6	.1	18.3
Rasheed Wallace	66	63	32.2	.419	.354	.772	7.4	1.4	.9	1.3	12.0
Antonio McDyess	62	30	30.1	.510		.698	9.8	1.3	.7	.8	9.6
Amir Johnson	62	24	14.7	.595		.657	3.7	.3	.3	1.0	3.5
Walter Herrmann	59	0	10.7	.396	.342	.760	1.8	.4	.1	.1	3.8
Kwame Brown	58	30	17.2	.533		.516	5.0	.6	.4	.4	4.2
Will Bynum	57	1	14.1	.456	.158	.798	1.3	2.8	.6	.0	7.2
Allen Iverson^{†}	54	50	36.5	.416	.286	.786	3.1	4.9	1.6	.1	17.4
Walter Sharpe	8	0	2.5	.364	.000	.000	.4	.0	.0	.3	1.0
Alex Acker^{†}	7	0	2.9	.364	.000	.500	.3	.1	.3	.1	1.3
Chauncey Billups^{†}	2	2	35.0	.333	.286	.900	5.0	7.5	1.5	.5	12.5

=== Playoffs ===
Player	GP	GS	MPG	FG%	3P%	FT%	RPG	APG	SPG	BPG	PPG
Richard Hamilton	4	4	38.5	.356	.200	.900	2.8	5.0	1.3	.3	13.3
Antonio McDyess	4	4	34.0	.523		1.000	8.5	.5	.5	.8	13.0
Tayshaun Prince	4	4	32.3	.259	.200		3.5	1.3	.3	.0	3.8
Rodney Stuckey	4	4	32.0	.393	.000	.857	2.3	5.3	.0	.0	15.0
Rasheed Wallace	4	4	30.5	.367	.500		6.3	.8	.5	.3	6.5
Will Bynum	4	0	19.5	.462	.250	1.000	1.5	2.5	1.3	.0	11.8
Arron Afflalo	4	0	16.5	.476	.200	.600	.8	.3	.0	.5	6.3
Jason Maxiell	4	0	16.0	.500		.556	3.3	.5	.3	.3	3.8
Walter Herrmann	4	0	5.5	.375	.500		.3	.5	.3	.0	2.0
Kwame Brown	3	0	16.0	.375		.750	5.0	.0	.0	1.0	3.0
Amir Johnson	3	0	4.3	1.000			1.0	.0	.0	.3	.7

- ^{†} Denotes player spent time with another team in the season. Stats reflect time with the Pistons only.
