= 2009 NBA playoffs =

Postseason tournament of the NBA

Tournament details
- Dates: April 18–June 14, 2009
- Season: 2008–09
- Teams: 16

Final positions
- Champions: Los Angeles Lakers (15th title)
- Runners-up: Orlando Magic
- Semifinalists: Cleveland Cavaliers; Denver Nuggets

Tournament statistics
- Scoring leader(s): Kobe Bryant (Lakers) (30.2 PPG)

Awards
- MVP: Kobe Bryant (Lakers)

The 2009 NBA playoffs was the postseason tournament of the National Basketball Association's 2008–09 season. The tournament concluded with the Western Conference champion Los Angeles Lakers defeating the Eastern Conference champion Orlando Magic 4 games to 1 in the NBA Finals. Kobe Bryant was named NBA Finals MVP.

The Boston Celtics were the defending champions, but lost in the conference semifinals to the Magic.

== Overview ==
The Portland Trail Blazers made the playoffs for the first time since 2003 and earned home court advantage in a playoff series for the first time since 2000.

The Miami Heat and the Chicago Bulls returned to the playoffs after a one-year absence. They pushed their first round opponents, the Atlanta Hawks and Boston Celtics (respectively) to seven games before losing.

The first round series between the Boston Celtics and Chicago Bulls set an NBA Playoff record for the most overtime games (4) and periods (7) played. However, the Boston Celtics prevailed in seven games.

With their first round win over the Portland Trail Blazers, the Houston Rockets won a first round series for the first time since 1997, when they last made the conference finals. They pushed the eventual champion Lakers to seven games before losing. The Rockets would not return to the playoffs until 2013.

With their first round win over the Miami Heat, the Atlanta Hawks won a playoff series for the first time since 1999. However, they were swept by the Cleveland Cavaliers in the conference semifinals.

With their first round win over the New Orleans Hornets, the Denver Nuggets won a playoff series for the first time since 1994, when they became the first eighth seed to win a playoff series.

As for the Detroit Pistons and San Antonio Spurs, they failed to advance past the first round for the first time since 2000. The Pistons were swept by the Cleveland Cavaliers, while the Spurs lost to the Dallas Mavericks in a five-game upset. The Pistons would not return to the playoffs until 2016, while the Spurs would exact revenge against the Mavericks in next year's playoffs.

By sweeping the Atlanta Hawks in the Conference Semifinals, the Cleveland Cavaliers became only the second team in NBA History (after the Miami Heat) to go 8–0 through the first two rounds by sweeping the Detroit Pistons and Atlanta Hawks (they would duplicate this feat in 2016, against the same two teams). This was also LeBron James’ last conference finals appearance as a member of the Cleveland Cavaliers until 2015.

With their conference semifinals victory over the Dallas Mavericks, the Denver Nuggets made the conference finals for the first time since 1985. However, they lost to the Los Angeles Lakers in six games, and would not return to the conference finals until 2020.

With their Game 7 road win over the Boston Celtics, the Orlando Magic made the Conference Finals for the first time since 1996. It also marked the first time the Boston Celtics lost a playoff series despite leading 3–2.

With their conference finals victory over the Cleveland Cavaliers, the Orlando Magic made the NBA Finals for the first time since 1995. The Cavaliers would not return to the Conference Finals until 2015.

Game 3 of the NBA Finals marked the first ever finals win for the Orlando Magic. However, they lost to the Los Angeles Lakers in five games.

Game 4 of the NBA Finals marked the first time since 1985 that two overtime games were played in the same NBA Finals series.

With the Lakers’ Game 5 win over the Orlando Magic, Phil Jackson overtook Red Auerbach with the most NBA Championships won by a head coach (10). It also marked the Lakers’ first NBA Finals series win since 2002.

Game 5 of the NBA Finals was also the last NBA Finals game ever played at Amway Arena.

== Format ==
The 3 division winners and 5 other teams with the most wins from each conference qualify for the playoffs. The seedings are based on each team's record; however, a division winner is guaranteed to be ranked at least 4th, regardless of record. All series are in a best-of-7 format with the Games 1–2, 5 and 7 on the home court of the team with the better record, regardless of their seed. For the NBA Finals, the team with the better record plays Games 1–2 and 6–7 at home.

=== Tiebreak procedures ===
The tiebreakers that determine seedings are:

1. Division leader wins tie from team not leading a division
2. Head-to-head record
3. Division record (if the teams are in the same division)
4. Conference record
5. Record vs. playoff teams, own conference
6. Record vs. playoff teams, other conference
7. Point differential, all games

If there are more than 2 teams tied, the team that wins the tiebreaker gets the highest seed, while the other teams are "re-broken" from the first step until all ties are resolved. Since the three division winners are guaranteed a spot in the top 4, ties to determine the division winners must be broken before any other ties.

== Playoff qualifying ==
=== Eastern Conference ===
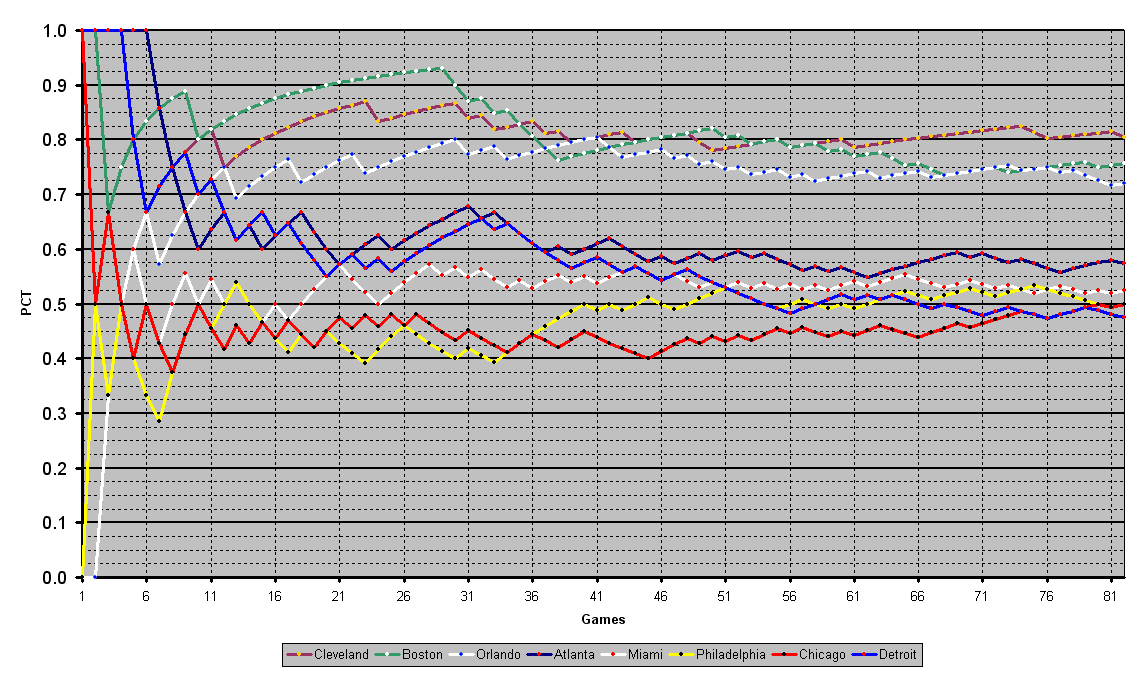
Eastern Conference qualifying.

Seed	Team	Wins	Tiebreaker	Clinched			
Seed	Team	Wins	Tiebreaker	Playoff berth	Division title	Home court in Conference Finals	Home court in NBA Finals
1	Cleveland Cavaliers	66	—	March 4	March 13	April 10	April 13
2	Boston Celtics	62	—	March 4	March 18	—	—
3	Orlando Magic	59	—	March 11	March 25	—	—
4	Atlanta Hawks	47	—	March 25	—	—	—
5	Miami Heat	43	—	April 3	—	—	—
6	Philadelphia 76ers	41	Conf.: 25–27^{[a]}	April 4	—	—	—
7	Chicago Bulls	41	Conf.: 24–28^{[a]}	April 10	—	—	—
8	Detroit Pistons	39	—	April 10	—	—	—

=== Western Conference ===
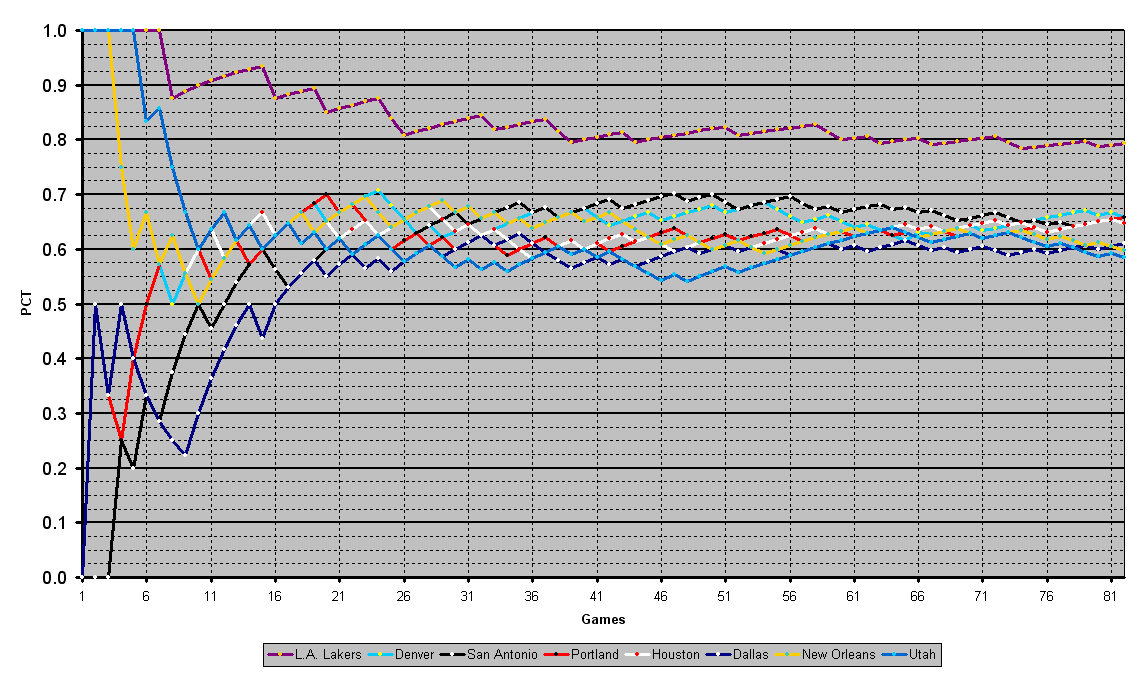
Western Conference qualifying.

Seed	Team	Wins	Tiebreaker		Clinched		
Seed	Team	Wins	Tiebreaker		Playoff berth	Division title	Home court in Conference Finals
1	Los Angeles Lakers	65	—		March 12	March 12	March 27
2	Denver Nuggets	54	Div.: 12–4^{[a]}	2–1 vs. SA	March 31	April 13	—
3	San Antonio Spurs	54	Skipped^{[b]}	1–2 vs. DEN	March 31	April 15	—
4	Portland Trail Blazers	54	Div.: 11–5^{[a]}	—	April 5	—	—
5	Houston Rockets	53	—		April 5	—	—
6	Dallas Mavericks	50	—		April 8	—	—
7	New Orleans Hornets	49	—		April 7	—	—
8	Utah Jazz	48	—		April 5	—	—

=== Notes ===
— = not applicable

- ^{a} The regular season series was tied 2–2.
- ^{b} Tie between division leaders was broken first.

== Bracket ==
First Round	Conference Semifinals
E1	Cleveland*	4
E8	Detroit	0
E1	Cleveland*	4
E4	Atlanta	0
E4	Atlanta	4
E5	Miami	3
Eastern Conference
E3	Orlando*	4
E6	Philadelphia	2
E3	Orlando*	4
E2	Boston*	3
E2	Boston*	4
E7	Chicago	3
W1	LA Lakers*	4
W8	Utah	1
W1	LA Lakers*	4
W5	Houston	3
W4	Portland	2
W5	Houston	4
Western Conference
W3	San Antonio*	1
W6	Dallas	4
W6	Dallas	1
W2	Denver*	4
W2	Denver*	4
W7	New Orleans	1

Conference Finals
E1	Cleveland*	2
E3	Orlando*	4
W1	LA Lakers*	4
W2	Denver*	2

NBA Finals
E3	Orlando*	1
W1	LA Lakers*	4

- * Division winner
- Bold Series winner
- Italic Team with home-court advantage

== First round ==
All times are in Eastern Daylight Time (UTC−4)

=== Eastern Conference first round ===
==== (1) Cleveland Cavaliers vs. (8) Detroit Pistons ====
ABC

April 18
2:00 p.m.

Recap

Detroit Pistons 84, Cleveland Cavaliers 102
Scoring by quarter: 25–30, 20–27, 20–21, 19–24
Pts: Rodney Stuckey 20; Rebs: Wallace, Brown 9 each Asts: Hamilton, Stuckey 4 each	Pts: LeBron James 38; Rebs: Žydrūnas Ilgauskas 10; Asts: LeBron James 7
Cleveland leads series, 1–0

Quicken Loans Arena, Cleveland, Ohio
Attendance: 20,562
Referees: Leon Wood, Ron Garretson, Steve Javie

TNT

April 21
8:00 p.m.

Recap

Detroit Pistons 82, Cleveland Cavaliers 94
Scoring by quarter: 14–23, 18–23, 18–31, 32–17
Pts: Richard Hamilton 17; Rebs: Antonio McDyess 11; Asts: Rodney Stuckey 6	Pts: LeBron James 29; Rebs: LeBron James 13; Asts: Mo Williams 7
Cleveland leads series, 2–0

Quicken Loans Arena, Cleveland, Ohio
Attendance: 20,562
Referees: Dick Bavetta, Bill Spooner, Derrick Collins

ESPN

April 24
7:00 p.m.

Recap

Cleveland Cavaliers 79, Detroit Pistons 68
Scoring by quarter: 18–18, 26–19, 9–16, 26–15
Pts: LeBron James 25; Rebs: LeBron James 11; Asts: LeBron James 9	Pts: Richard Hamilton 15; Rebs: McDyess, Hamilton 8 each Asts: Richard Hamilton 6
Cleveland leads series, 3–0

The Palace of Auburn Hills, Auburn Hills, Michigan
Attendance: 22,076
Referees: Dan Crawford, Greg Willard, Joe Forte

ABC

April 26
3:30 p.m.

Recap

Cleveland Cavaliers 99, Detroit Pistons 78
Scoring by quarter: 26–27, 25–15, 22–18, 26–18
Pts: LeBron James 36; Rebs: LeBron James 13; Asts: LeBron James 8	Pts: Antonio McDyess 26; Rebs: Antonio McDyess 10; Asts: Richard Hamilton 7
Cleveland wins series, 4–0

The Palace of Auburn Hills, Auburn Hills, Michigan
Attendance: 22,076
Referees: Joe Crawford, Ken Mauer, Jim Clark

Regular-season series
Cleveland won 3–1 in the regular-season series

November 19, 2008

Recap

Cleveland Cavaliers 89, Detroit Pistons 96

The Palace of Auburn Hills, Auburn Hills, Michigan

February 1, 2009

Recap

Cleveland Cavaliers 90, Detroit Pistons 80

The Palace of Auburn Hills, Auburn Hills, Michigan

February 22, 2009

Recap

Detroit Pistons 78, Cleveland Cavaliers 99

Quicken Loans Arena, Cleveland, Ohio

March 31, 2009

Recap

Detroit Pistons 73, Cleveland Cavaliers 79

Quicken Loans Arena, Cleveland, Ohio

This was the third playoff meeting between these two teams, with each team winning one series apiece.

Previous playoff series
Tied 1–1 in all-time playoff series

2006

Cleveland Cavaliers 3, Detroit Pistons 4

2006 Eastern Conference Semifinals

2007

Cleveland Cavaliers 4, Detroit Pistons 2

2007 Eastern Conference Finals

The Cavaliers opened the series with a rout on Game 1, as LeBron James scored 38 points and the Cavaliers won by 18 points. In Game 2, the Cavaliers were leading by 27 points after the third quarter before the Pistons started a comeback in the fourth quarter. The Pistons managed to cut the Cavaliers' lead down to 7 points, but in the end the Cavaliers won the game by 12 points. Game 3 was a tight contest until an 18–2 run by the Cavaliers in the fourth quarter secured the victory for Cleveland. The Cavaliers swept the Pistons with a 21-point victory in Game 4, in which James scored 36 points while narrowly missing a triple-double for two straight games.

==== (2) Boston Celtics vs. (7) Chicago Bulls ====
ESPN

April 18
12:30 p.m.

Recap

Chicago Bulls 105, Boston Celtics 103 (OT)
Scoring by quarter: 28–28, 23–16, 20–26, 26–27, Overtime: 8–6
Pts: Derrick Rose 36; Rebs: Joakim Noah 17; Asts: Derrick Rose 11	Pts: Rajon Rondo 29; Rebs: Rajon Rondo 9 Asts: Rajon Rondo 7
Chicago leads series, 1–0

TD Banknorth Garden, Boston
Attendance: 18,624
Referees: Bennett Salvatore, Eddie F. Rush, Michael Smith

TNT

April 20
7:00 p.m.

Recap

Chicago Bulls 115, Boston Celtics 118
Scoring by quarter: 29–35, 32–23, 26–30, 28–30
Pts: Ben Gordon 42; Rebs: Brad Miller 9 Asts: Kirk Hinrich 7	Pts: Ray Allen 30; Rebs: Perkins, Rondo 12 each Asts: Rajon Rondo 16
Series tied, 1–1

TD Banknorth Garden, Boston
Attendance: 18,624
Referees: Steve Javie, Ron Garretson, Pat Fraher

TNT

April 23
8:00 p.m.

Recap

Boston Celtics 107, Chicago Bulls 86
Scoring by quarter: 32–21, 27–16, 24–21, 24–28
Pts: Paul Pierce 24; Rebs: Rajon Rondo 11; Asts: Rondo, Davis 6 each	Pts: Ben Gordon 15; Rebs: Joakim Noah 10; Asts: three players 3 each
Boston leads series, 2–1

United Center, Chicago
Attendance: 23,072
Referees: Scott Foster, David Jones, Bill Spooner

ABC

April 26
1:00 p.m.

Recap

Boston Celtics 118, Chicago Bulls 121 (2OT)
Scoring by quarter: 19–18, 27–27, 24–20, 26–31, Overtime: 14–14, 8–11
Pts: Paul Pierce 29; Rebs: Davis, Rondo 11 each Asts: Rajon Rondo 11	Pts: Derrick Rose 23; Rebs: Derrick Rose 11; Asts: Derrick Rose 9
Series tied, 2–2

United Center, Chicago
Attendance: 23,067
Referees: Dan Crawford, Marc Davis, Bill Kennedy

TNT

April 28
7:00 p.m.

Recap

Chicago Bulls 104, Boston Celtics 106 (OT)
Scoring by quarter: 21–23, 26–21, 23–22, 23–27, Overtime: 11–13
Pts: Ben Gordon 26; Rebs: Joakim Noah 17; Asts: Gordon, Rose 6 each	Pts: Rajon Rondo 28; Rebs: Kendrick Perkins 19; Asts: Rajon Rondo 11
Boston leads series, 3–2

TD Banknorth Garden, Boston
Attendance: 18,624
Referees: Mark Wunderlich, Joe Derosa, Sean Corbin

TNT

April 30
7:00 p.m.

Recap

Boston Celtics 127, Chicago Bulls 128 (3OT)
Scoring by quarter: 26–37, 31–22, 19–24, 25–18, Overtime: 8–8, 9–9, 9–10
Pts: Ray Allen 51; Rebs: Kendrick Perkins 13; Asts: Rajon Rondo 19	Pts: John Salmons 35; Rebs: Joakim Noah 15; Asts: Rose, Hinrich 7 each
Series tied, 3–3

United Center, Chicago
Attendance: 23,430
Referees: Joe Crawford, Derrick Stafford, Ed Malloy

TNT

May 2
8:00 p.m.

Recap

Chicago Bulls 99, Boston Celtics 109
Scoring by quarter: 28–23, 11–29, 33–26, 27–31
Pts: Ben Gordon 33; Rebs: Joakim Noah 15; Asts: Ben Gordon 4	Pts: Ray Allen 23; Rebs: Kendrick Perkins 13; Asts: Rajon Rondo 11
Boston wins series, 4–3

TD Banknorth Garden, Boston
Attendance: 18,624
Referees: Steve Javie, Greg Willard, Monty McCutchen

Regular-season series
Boston won 2–1 in the regular-season series

October 31, 2008

Recap

Chicago Bulls 80, Boston Celtics 96

TD Banknorth Garden, Boston

December 19, 2008

Recap

Chicago Bulls 108, Boston Celtics 126

TD Banknorth Garden, Boston

March 17, 2009

Recap

Boston Celtics 121, Chicago Bulls 127

United Center, Chicago, Illinois

This series has been called the greatest first round series ever, and compared to the greatest series overall. It featured four overtime games with seven overtime periods, the most ever in a playoff series. The series highlights included future NBA MVP Derrick Rose setting an NBA single game rookie scoring record. This was the fourth playoff meeting between these two teams, with the Celtics winning the first three meetings.

Previous playoff series
Boston leads 3–0 in all-time playoff series

1981

Boston Celtics 4, Chicago Bulls 0

1981 Eastern Conference Semifinals

1986

Boston Celtics 3, Chicago Bulls 0

1986 Eastern Conference First Round

1987

Boston Celtics 3, Chicago Bulls 0

1987 Eastern Conference First Round

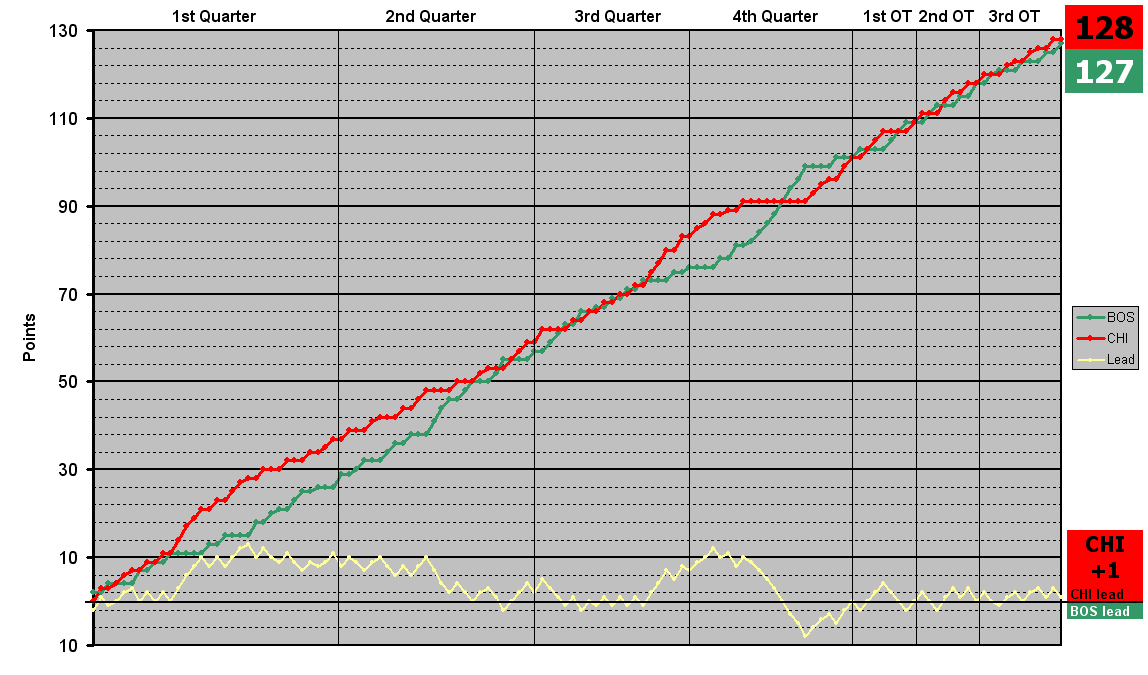
Game 6 running score

In Game 1, with the Bulls trailing by 1, rookie Derrick Rose hit 2 free throws with 9.6 seconds left. Celtics captain Paul Pierce had a chance to win the game with his own free throws from a Joakim Noah foul but missed the second, leading to overtime. In the overtime, with Rose fouling out, Tyrus Thomas scored six of the Bulls' eight points to put them up 105–103 with about 50 seconds left. Ray Allen, who had a poor shooting night, had a chance to tie the game and send it into a second overtime but he did not succeed. Even while the playoffs were continuing, many experts and analysts were calling it "the greatest playoff series ever".

Rose matched Kareem Abdul-Jabbar's playoff debut of 36 points to lead the Bulls into a Game 1 road victory. Rose also became the second player to have a 35-point, 10-assist game in their playoff debut in history, after Chris Paul did the feat in 2008; his 36 points was also the highest points scored by a Bull in a playoff game since Michael Jordan retired. The win also marked the Bulls' first postseason win against the Celtics in history.

In Game 2, Ben Gordon poured in 42 points, but lost the duel to Ray Allen. The Bulls were blown out in Game 3. At home in the end of regulation of Game 4, Gordon hit a big bank shot putting the Bulls up 95–93. The Bulls would go on to win in 2OT.

Game 5:

The Bulls held a double digit lead, and Boston came back behind Paul Pierce. Gordon hit a tough shot over Stephon Marbury. Pierce tied with his own jumper, Brad Miller missed 2 free throws with 2 seconds remaining in overtime, and Boston won.

Game 6:

The Bulls had to come back from being down 8 in the final 2 minutes of regulation, and did so behind John Salmons. Ray Allen scored 51 points, but the Bulls won in 3OT.

Game 7:

The Celtics finished the Bulls off with a 10-point victory.

==== (3) Orlando Magic vs. (6) Philadelphia 76ers ====
TNT

April 19
5:30 p.m.

Recap

Philadelphia 76ers 100, Orlando Magic 98
Scoring by quarter: 27–25, 19–25, 19–29, 35–19
Pts: Andre Iguodala 20; Rebs: Andre Iguodala 8 Asts: Andre Iguodala 8	Pts: Dwight Howard 31; Rebs: Dwight Howard 16; Asts: Rafer Alston 5
Philadelphia leads series, 1–0

Amway Arena, Orlando, Florida
Attendance: 17,461
Referees: Dan Crawford, Ken Mauer, Zach Zarba

NBA TV

April 22
7:00 p.m.

Recap

Philadelphia 76ers 87, Orlando Magic 96
Scoring by quarter: 21–21, 18–25, 23–24, 25–26
Pts: Andre Miller 30; Rebs: Iguodala, Ratliff 8 each Asts: Andre Iguodala 7	Pts: Courtney Lee 24; Rebs: Dwight Howard 10; Asts: Rashard Lewis 6
Series tied, 1–1

Amway Arena, Orlando, Florida
Attendance: 17,461
Referees: Steve Javie, James Capers, Greg Willard

ESPN2

April 24
8:00 p.m.

Recap

Orlando Magic 94, Philadelphia 76ers 96
Scoring by quarter: 21–25, 28–35, 28–19, 17–17
Pts: Dwight Howard 36; Rebs: Dwight Howard 11; Asts: Courtney Lee 5	Pts: Andre Iguodala 29; Rebs: Miller, Dalembert 9 each Asts: Andre Miller 7
Philadelphia leads series, 2–1

Wachovia Center, Philadelphia
Attendance: 16,492
Referees: Bill Kennedy, Jim Clark, Monty McCutchen

TNT

April 26
6:30 p.m.

Recap

Orlando Magic 84, Philadelphia 76ers 81
Scoring by quarter: 24–22, 12–14, 28–19, 20–26
Pts: Dwight Howard 18; Rebs: Dwight Howard 18; Asts: Rafer Alston 5	Pts: Andre Miller 17; Rebs: Samuel Dalembert 9 Asts: Andre Iguodala 11
Series tied, 2–2

Wachovia Center, Philadelphia
Attendance: 16,464
Referees: Dick Bavetta, Tony Brothers, Sean Corbin

NBA TV

April 28
7:30 p.m.

Recap

Philadelphia 76ers 78, Orlando Magic 91
Scoring by quarter: 20–21, 19–24, 21–24, 18–22
Pts: Andre Iguodala 26; Rebs: Samuel Dalembert 9 Asts: Andre Miller 6	Pts: Howard, Lewis 24 each Rebs: Dwight Howard 24; Asts: Alston, Türkoğlu 4 each
Orlando leads series, 3–2

Amway Arena, Orlando, Florida
Attendance: 17,461
Referees: Joe Crawford, Derrick Stafford, Marc Davis

NBA TV

April 30
7:30 p.m.

Recap

Orlando Magic 114, Philadelphia 76ers 89
Scoring by quarter: 30–19, 32–29, 25–24, 27–17
Pts: Rashard Lewis 29; Rebs: Marcin Gortat 15; Asts: Rafer Alston 10	Pts: Andre Miller 24; Rebs: Samuel Dalembert 13; Asts: Andre Iguodala 6
Orlando wins series, 4–2

Wachovia Center, Philadelphia
Attendance: 16,691
Referees: Derrick Collins, Scott Foster, Tom Washington

Regular-season series
Orlando won 3–0 in the regular-season series

November 6, 2008

Recap

Philadelphia 76ers 88, Orlando Magic 98

Amway Arena, Orlando, Florida

November 26, 2008

Recap

Orlando Magic 96, Philadelphia 76ers 94

Wachovia Center, Philadelphia

February 28, 2009

Recap

Orlando Magic 106, Philadelphia 76ers 100

Wachovia Center, Philadelphia

This was the second playoff meeting between these two teams, with the 76ers winning the first meeting.

Previous playoff series
Philadelphia leads 1–0 in all-time playoff series

1999

Orlando Magic 1, Philadelphia 76ers 3

1999 Eastern Conference First Round

In Game 1, the Magic had an 18-point lead in the fourth quarter and Andre Iguodala scored a jumper with 2.2 seconds remaining to give the Sixers a road win over Hedo Türkoğlu. The Sixers almost managed another comeback in Game 2. The Magic led by 18 points midway through the third quarter before another late run by the Sixers brought the lead down to 5 points before the Magic finally won the game. The Sixers won Game 3 courtesy of another late shot; Thaddeus Young scored a layup with 2 seconds left to secure the win, despite a career playoff-high 36-point performance by Dwight Howard. The Magic secured a road win in Game 4 with their own late shot; Türkoğlu scored his own game-winning three-pointer with 1.1 seconds left to even the series.

In Game 5, Dwight Howard had 24 points and a career playoff-high 24 rebounds, leading the Magic to a victory. Game 5 was marked with an elbowing incident by Howard on Samuel Dalembert, which led to a one-game suspension for Howard. Rookie Courtney Lee also went down injured after taking an inadvertent elbow on the head from Howard. Despite losing two starters, Howard and Lee, the Magic won game 6, beating the Sixers on the road by 25 points to win the series.

==== (4) Atlanta Hawks vs. (5) Miami Heat ====
TNT

April 19
8:00 p.m.

Recap

Miami Heat 64, Atlanta Hawks 90
Scoring by quarter: 21–24, 18–35, 18–17, 7–14
Pts: Dwyane Wade 19; Rebs: Michael Beasley 10; Asts: Dwyane Wade 5	Pts: Josh Smith 23; Rebs: Smith, Pachulia 10 each Asts: Mike Bibby 9
Atlanta leads series, 1–0

Philips Arena, Atlanta
Attendance: 18,851
Referees: Scott Foster, Joe DeRosa, Gary Zielinski

TNT

April 22
8:00 p.m.

Recap

Miami Heat 108, Atlanta Hawks 93
Scoring by quarter: 24–18, 30–23, 29–31, 25–21
Pts: Dwyane Wade 33; Rebs: Udonis Haslem 8 Asts: Chalmers, Wade 7 each	Pts: Mike Bibby 18; Rebs: Al Horford 11; Asts: Al Horford 5
Series tied, 1–1

Philips Arena, Atlanta
Attendance: 19,146
Referees: Dan Crawford, Jason Philips, Ken Mauer

TNT

April 25
6:30 p.m.

Recap

Atlanta Hawks 78, Miami Heat 107
Scoring by quarter: 12–22, 17–28, 32–35, 17–32
Pts: three players 13 each Rebs: Josh Smith 8 Asts: three players 3 each	Pts: Dwyane Wade 29; Rebs: Udonis Haslem 13; Asts: Dwyane Wade 8
Miami leads series, 2–1

American Airlines Arena, Miami
Attendance: 19,600
Referees: Steve Javie, David Jones, James Capers

TNT

April 27
8:00 p.m.

Recap

Atlanta Hawks 81, Miami Heat 71
Scoring by quarter: 24–17, 22–25, 17–13, 18–16
Pts: Mike Bibby 15; Rebs: Zaza Pachulia 18; Asts: Joe Johnson 5	Pts: Dwyane Wade 22; Rebs: Udonis Haslem 9 Asts: Dwyane Wade 7
Series tied, 2–2

American Airlines Arena, Miami
Attendance: 19,600
Referees: Bennett Salvatore, Michael Smith, Tom Washington

TNT

April 29
8:00 p.m.

Recap

Miami Heat 91, Atlanta Hawks 106
Scoring by quarter: 20–24, 20–39, 30–22, 21–21
Pts: Dwyane Wade 29; Rebs: Udonis Haslem 8 Asts: Mario Chalmers 6	Pts: Joe Johnson 25; Rebs: Josh Smith 8 Asts: Joe Johnson 6
Atlanta leads series, 3–2

Philips Arena, Atlanta
Attendance: 19,051
Referees: Violet Palmer, Dick Bavetta, Tony Brothers

ESPN

May 1
8:00 p.m.

Recap

Atlanta Hawks 72, Miami Heat 98
Scoring by quarter: 18–32, 24–19, 14–27, 16–20
Pts: Mike Bibby 20; Rebs: Josh Smith 10; Asts: Mike Bibby 3	Pts: Dwyane Wade 41; Rebs: Michael Beasley 15; Asts: Mario Chalmers 8
Series tied, 3–3

American Airlines Arena, Miami
Attendance: 19,600
Referees: Mark Wunderlich, Marc Davis, Sean Corbin

ABC

May 3
1:00 p.m.

Recap

Miami Heat 78, Atlanta Hawks 91
Scoring by quarter: 18–20, 18–29, 16–16, 26–26
Pts: Dwyane Wade 31; Rebs: Udonis Haslem 13; Asts: Chalmers, Wade 4 each	Pts: Joe Johnson 27; Rebs: Josh Smith 9 Asts: Mike Bibby 6
Atlanta wins series, 4–3

Philips Arena, Atlanta
Attendance: 18,864
Referees: Joe Crawford, Bennett Salvatore, Ron Garretson

Regular-season series
Atlanta won 3–1 in the regular-season series

December 12, 2008

Recap

Atlanta Hawks 87, Miami Heat 73

American Airlines Arena, Miami

January 26, 2009

Recap

Atlanta Hawks 79, Miami Heat 95

American Airlines Arena, Miami

February 27, 2009

Recap

Miami Heat 83, Atlanta Hawks 91

Philips Arena, Atlanta

April 14, 2009

Recap

Miami Heat 79, Atlanta Hawks 81

Philips Arena, Atlanta

This was the second playoff meeting between these two teams, with the Hawks winning the first meeting.

Previous playoff series
Atlanta leads 1–0 in all-time playoff series

1994

Atlanta Hawks 3, Miami Heat 2

1994 Eastern Conference First Round

The Hawks opened the series with a 26-point win after leading by as much as 20 points at halftime. The Hawks also tied a franchise record for fewest points allowed in a playoff game. However, the Heat managed to rebound from the loss and won Game 2 on the road to tie the series. The Heat won Game 3 at home, almost in similar fashion as the Hawks' victory in Game 1. The Heat was already leading by 19 points at halftime and ended up winning by 29 points. In the next game, the Hawks bounced back and won a road game to even the series.

Game 5 was marked by several hard fouls and technical fouls. Dwyane Wade was fouled and sent tumbling down by Solomon Jones before a skirmish between Wade, Jones, Jamaal Magloire and Josh Smith started. All four players were given technical fouls in the incident. Wade was later called for a flagrant foul after he fouled Maurice Evans during a layup attempt. The flagrant foul was later rescinded by the officials after they reviewed the play. The Hawks finally won the game, despite losing starting center Al Horford due to injury in the second quarter. The Heat evened the series at 3–3 after winning Game 6. Wade scored 41 points to lead the Heat to a 26-point rout over the Hawks. The Hawks finally won the series after winning Game 7 at home, with 13 points difference. All seven games of the series were decided by at least 10 points, with an average margin of 19 points.

=== Western Conference first round ===
==== (1) Los Angeles Lakers vs. (8) Utah Jazz ====
ABC

April 19
3:00 p.m.

Recap

Utah Jazz 100, Los Angeles Lakers 113
Scoring by quarter: 19–30, 21–32, 33–24, 27–27
Pts: Carlos Boozer 27; Rebs: Carlos Boozer 9 Asts: Deron Williams 17	Pts: Kobe Bryant 24; Rebs: Pau Gasol 9 Asts: Kobe Bryant 8
LA Lakers lead series, 1–0

Staples Center, Los Angeles
Attendance: 18,997
Referees: Derrick Stafford, Ed Malloy, Joe Crawford

TNT

April 21
10:30 p.m.

Recap

Utah Jazz 109, Los Angeles Lakers 119
Scoring by quarter: 29–41, 26–25, 23–23, 31–30
Pts: Deron Williams 35; Rebs: Carlos Boozer 10; Asts: Deron Williams 10	Pts: Kobe Bryant 26; Rebs: Gasol, Bryant 6 each Asts: Ariza, Bryant 9 each
LA Lakers lead series, 2–0

Staples Center, Los Angeles
Attendance: 18,997
Referees: Marc Davis, Sean Corbin, Monty McCutchen

TNT

April 23
10:30 p.m.

Recap

Los Angeles Lakers 86, Utah Jazz 88
Scoring by quarter: 17–26, 22–17, 29–17, 18–28
Pts: Lamar Odom 21; Rebs: Lamar Odom 14; Asts: Kobe Bryant 6	Pts: Carlos Boozer 23; Rebs: Carlos Boozer 22; Asts: Deron Williams 9
LA Lakers lead series, 2–1

EnergySolutions Arena, Salt Lake City
Attendance: 19,911
Referees: Bennett Salvadore, Mike Callahan, Eric Lewis

ESPN

April 25
9:00 p.m.

Recap

Los Angeles Lakers 108, Utah Jazz 94
Scoring by quarter: 20–25, 40–28, 28–16, 20–25
Pts: Kobe Bryant 38; Rebs: Lamar Odom 15; Asts: Lamar Odom 6	Pts: Williams, Boozer 23 each Rebs: Carlos Boozer 16; Asts: Deron Williams 13
LA Lakers lead series, 3–1

EnergySolutions Arena, Salt Lake City
Attendance: 19,911
Referees: Bill Spooner, Mark Wunderlich, Joe Derosa

TNT

April 27
10:30 p.m.

Recap

Utah Jazz 96, Los Angeles Lakers 107
Scoring by quarter: 26–26, 17–30, 20–26, 33–25
Pts: Paul Millsap 16; Rebs: Mehmet Okur 8 Asts: Deron Williams 6	Pts: Kobe Bryant 31; Rebs: Lamar Odom 15; Asts: four players 4 each
LA Lakers win series, 4–1

Staples Center, Los Angeles
Attendance: 18,997
Referees: Gary Zielinski, James Capers, Steve Javie

Regular-season series
Los Angeles won 2–1 in the regular-season series

January 2, 2009

Recap

Utah Jazz 100, Los Angeles Lakers 113

Staples Center, Los Angeles

February 11, 2009

Recap

Los Angeles Lakers 109, Utah Jazz 113

EnergySolutions Arena, Salt Lake City

April 14, 2009

Recap

Utah Jazz 112, Los Angeles Lakers 125

Staples Center, Los Angeles

This was the fifth playoff meeting between these two teams, with each team winning two series apiece.

Previous playoff series
Tied 2–2 in all-time playoff series

1988

Los Angeles Lakers 4, Utah Jazz 3

1988 Western Conference Semifinals

1997

Los Angeles Lakers 1, Utah Jazz 4

1997 Western Conference Semifinals

1998

Los Angeles Lakers 0, Utah Jazz 4

1998 Western Conference Finals

2008

Los Angeles Lakers 4, Utah Jazz 2

2008 Western Conference Semifinals

==== (2) Denver Nuggets vs. (7) New Orleans Hornets ====
TNT

April 19
10:30 p.m.

Recap

New Orleans Hornets 84, Denver Nuggets 113
Scoring by quarter: 25–27, 22–28, 22–32, 15–26
Pts: Chris Paul 21; Rebs: David West 6 Asts: Chris Paul 11	Pts: Chauncey Billups 36; Rebs: Nenê 14; Asts: Chauncey Billups 8
Denver leads series, 1–0

Pepsi Center, Denver
Attendance: 19,536
Referees: Marc Davis, Monty McCutchen, Sean Corbin

TNT

April 22
10:30 p.m.

Recap

New Orleans Hornets 93, Denver Nuggets 108
Scoring by quarter: 25–27, 19–25, 27–29, 22–27
Pts: David West 21; Rebs: Tyson Chandler 11; Asts: Chris Paul 13	Pts: Chauncey Billups 31; Rebs: Nenê 8 Asts: Carmelo Anthony 9
Denver leads series, 2–0

Pepsi Center, Denver
Attendance: 19,623
Referees: Mark Wunderlich, Violet Palmer, Joe DeRosa

ESPN

April 25
1:00 p.m.

Recap

Denver Nuggets 93, New Orleans Hornets 95
Scoring by quarter: 26–21, 21–29, 25–27, 21–18
Pts: Carmelo Anthony 25; Rebs: Kenyon Martin 10; Asts: Chauncey Billups 6	Pts: Chris Paul 32; Rebs: West, Posey 9 each Asts: Chris Paul 12
Denver leads series, 2–1

New Orleans Arena, New Orleans
Attendance: 17,489
Referees: Bennett Salvatore, Derrick Stafford, Tom Washington

NBA TV

April 27
8:30 p.m.

Recap

Denver Nuggets 121, New Orleans Hornets 63
Scoring by quarter: 36–15, 25–24, 27–11, 33–13
Pts: Carmelo Anthony 26; Rebs: Chris Andersen 8 Asts: Chauncey Billups 8	Pts: David West 14; Rebs: James Posey 7 Asts: Chris Paul 6
Denver leads series, 3–1

New Orleans Arena, New Orleans
Attendance: 17,236
Referees: David Jones, Mike Callahan, Scott Foster

TNT

April 29
10:30 p.m.

Recap

New Orleans Hornets 86, Denver Nuggets 107
Scoring by quarter: 27–24, 22–25, 17–31, 20–27
Pts: David West 24; Rebs: David West 9 Asts: Chris Paul 10	Pts: Carmelo Anthony 34; Rebs: three players 7 each Asts: Chauncey Billups 11
Denver wins series 4–1

Pepsi Center, Denver
Attendance: 19,744
Referees: Steve Javie, Ken Mauer, Bill Kennedy

Regular-season series
Tied 2–2 in the regular-season series

November 27, 2008

Recap

New Orleans Hornets 105, Denver Nuggets 101

Pepsi Center, Denver, Colorado

January 3, 2009

Recap

New Orleans Hornets 100, Denver Nuggets 105

Pepsi Center, Denver, Colorado

January 28, 2009

Recap

Denver Nuggets 81, New Orleans Hornets 94

New Orleans Arena, New Orleans

March 25, 2009

Recap

Denver Nuggets 101, New Orleans Hornets 88

New Orleans Arena, New Orleans

This was the first playoff meeting between the Nuggets and the New Orleans Pelicans/Hornets franchise.

The Nuggets routed the Hornets in Game 1, led by hometown player Chauncey Billups's 36 points in his playoff debut for the Nuggets. He sank a career playoff-high 8 three-pointers and added 8 assists in the game. He continued his form in Game 2, scoring 31 points as the Nuggets took a 2–0 lead in the series. The Hornets bounced back with a victory in Game 3. Game 3 was marked with plenty of fouls, with a total of 58 personal fouls in the game, resulting in four players fouling out of the game, David West and Tyson Chandler for the Hornets, and Kenyon Martin and Nenê for the Nuggets. The referees also called three flagrant fouls from James Posey, Chandler and Billups. Hornets' head coach Byron Scott was also called for a technical foul after arguing on Posey's flagrant foul.

The Nuggets then pulled a 58-point win in Game 4. The margin tied the most lopsided victory in playoff history set 53 years ago by the Minneapolis Lakers. The Hornets recorded a playoff-low in points and also a playoff-high 26 turnovers, which led to 41 Nuggets' points. The Nuggets then recorded their first series win since 1994 after a victory in Game 5. Carmelo Anthony scored his career playoff-high with 34 points as the Nuggets cruised to another double-digit win. The average margin of victory in the Nuggets's four wins was 30.75 points.

==== (3) San Antonio Spurs vs. (6) Dallas Mavericks ====
ESPN

April 18
8:00 p.m.

Recap

Dallas Mavericks 105, San Antonio Spurs 97
Scoring by quarter: 18–29, 27–20, 29–25, 31–23
Pts: Josh Howard 25; Rebs: Erick Dampier 11; Asts: Jason Kidd 5	Pts: Tim Duncan 27; Rebs: Tim Duncan 9 Asts: Tony Parker 8
Dallas leads series, 1–0

AT&T Center, San Antonio
Attendance: 18,797
Referees: Dick Bavetta, James Capers, Tony Brothers

TNT

April 20
9:30 p.m.

Recap

Dallas Mavericks 84, San Antonio Spurs 105
Scoring by quarter: 19–30, 27–27, 17–28, 21–20
Pts: Jason Terry 16; Rebs: Dirk Nowitzki 6 Asts: Jason Kidd 5	Pts: Tony Parker 38; Rebs: Tim Duncan 11; Asts: Tony Parker 8
Series tied, 1–1

AT&T Center, San Antonio
Attendance: 18,797
Referees: Mark Wunderlich, Joe Forte, Tom Washington

NBA TV

April 23
8:30 p.m.

Recap

San Antonio Spurs 67, Dallas Mavericks 88
Scoring by quarter: 16–27, 14–19, 12–29, 25–13
Pts: Tony Parker 12; Rebs: Kurt Thomas 10; Asts: Tony Parker 3	Pts: Dirk Nowitzki 20; Rebs: Erick Dampier 9 Asts: José Juan Barea 6
Dallas leads series, 2–1

American Airlines Center, Dallas
Attendance: 20,491
Referees: Joe Crawford, Eddie Rush, Derrick Collins, Marc Davis

TNT

April 25
4:00 p.m.

Recap

San Antonio Spurs 90, Dallas Mavericks 99
Scoring by quarter: 29–32, 26–19, 16–29, 19–19
Pts: Tony Parker 43; Rebs: Tim Duncan 10; Asts: Tim Duncan 7	Pts: Josh Howard 28; Rebs: Dirk Nowitzki 13; Asts: Jason Kidd 7
Dallas leads series, 3–1

American Airlines Center, Dallas
Attendance: 20,829
Referees: Mike Callahan, Scott Foster, Zach Zarba

TNT

April 28
9:30 p.m.

Recap

Dallas Mavericks 106, San Antonio Spurs 93
Scoring by quarter: 31–20, 21–28, 30–19, 24–26
Pts: Dirk Nowitzki 31; Rebs: Erick Dampier 12; Asts: Jason Kidd 6	Pts: Tim Duncan 30; Rebs: Tim Duncan 8 Asts: Tony Parker 12
Dallas wins series, 4–1

AT&T Center, San Antonio
Attendance: 18,797
Referees: Ron Garretson, Greg Willard, Monty McCutchen

Regular-season series
Tied 2–2 in the regular-season series

November 4, 2008

Recap

Dallas Mavericks 98, San Antonio Spurs 81

AT&T Center, San Antonio

December 9, 2008

Recap

San Antonio Spurs 133, Dallas Mavericks 126 (2OT)

American Airlines Center, Dallas

February 24, 2009

Recap

Dallas Mavericks 76, San Antonio Spurs 93

AT&T Center, San Antonio

March 4, 2009

Recap

San Antonio Spurs 102, Dallas Mavericks 107

American Airlines Center, Dallas

This was the fourth playoff meeting between these two teams, with the Spurs winning two of the first three meetings.

Previous playoff series
San Antonio leads 2–1 in all-time playoff series

2001

Dallas Mavericks 1, San Antonio Spurs 4

2001 Western Conference Semifinals

2003

Dallas Mavericks 2, San Antonio Spurs 4

2003 Western Conference Finals

2006

Dallas Mavericks 4, San Antonio Spurs 3

2006 Western Conference Semifinals

==== (4) Portland Trail Blazers vs. (5) Houston Rockets ====
ESPN

April 18
10:30 p.m.

Recap

Houston Rockets 108, Portland Trail Blazers 81
Scoring by quarter: 34–23, 28–21, 23–14, 23–23
Pts: Aaron Brooks 27; Rebs: Dikembe Mutombo 9 Asts: Aaron Brooks 7	Pts: Brandon Roy 21; Rebs: four players 5 each Asts: Steve Blake 6
Houston leads series, 1–0

Rose Garden, Portland, Oregon
Attendance: 20,329
Referees: Bill Kennedy, Mark Wunderlich, Tom Washington

NBA TV

April 21
10:00 p.m.

Recap

Houston Rockets 103, Portland Trail Blazers 107
Scoring by quarter: 26–28, 25–25, 21–19, 31–35
Pts: Aaron Brooks 23; Rebs: Yao Ming 8 Asts: Aaron Brooks 5	Pts: Brandon Roy 42; Rebs: LaMarcus Aldridge 12; Asts: Steve Blake 5
Series tied, 1–1

Rose Garden, Portland, Oregon
Attendance: 20,408
Referees: Derrick Stafford, Ed Malloy, Joe Crawford

ESPN

April 24
9:30 p.m.

Recap

Portland Trail Blazers 83, Houston Rockets 86
Scoring by quarter: 15–21, 22–27, 22–18, 24–20
Pts: Brandon Roy 19; Rebs: LaMarcus Aldridge 8 Asts: Steve Blake 10	Pts: Luis Scola 19; Rebs: Yao Ming 13; Asts: Aaron Brooks 5
Houston leads series, 2–1

Toyota Center, Houston, Texas
Attendance: 18,731
Referees: Dick Bavetta, Jason Phillips, Tony Brothers

TNT

April 26
9:00 p.m.

Recap

Portland Trail Blazers 88, Houston Rockets 89
Scoring by quarter: 22–30, 22–20, 26–14, 18–25
Pts: Brandon Roy 31; Rebs: Joel Przybilla 12; Asts: Steve Blake 8	Pts: Yao Ming 21; Rebs: Yao Ming 12; Asts: Ron Artest 9
Houston leads series, 3–1

Toyota Center, Houston, Texas
Attendance: 18,271
Referees: Ron Garretson, Greg Willard, Monty McCutchen

NBA TV

April 28
10:00 p.m.

Recap

Houston Rockets 77, Portland Trail Blazers 88
Scoring by quarter: 26–29, 17–21, 19–14, 15–24
Pts: Luis Scola 19; Rebs: Yao Ming 10; Asts: Ron Artest 5	Pts: Aldridge, Roy 25 each Rebs: Aldridge, Blake 7 each Asts: Joel Przybilla 4
Houston leads series, 3–2

Rose Garden, Portland, Oregon
Attendance: 20,462
Referees: Bill Spooner, Leon Wood, Dan Crawford

TNT

April 30
9:30 p.m.

Recap

Portland Trail Blazers 76, Houston Rockets 92
Scoring by quarter: 19–21, 18–31, 19–21, 20–18
Pts: LaMarcus Aldridge 26; Rebs: Przybilla, Fernández 8 each Asts: Steve Blake 5	Pts: Ron Artest 27; Rebs: Yao Ming 10; Asts: Kyle Lowry 3
Houston wins series, 4–2

Toyota Center, Houston, Texas
Attendance: 18,376
Referees: Bennett Salvatore, James Capers, Mike Callahan

Game 2 is Dikembe Mutombo's final NBA game.

Regular-season series
Houston won 2–1 in the regular-season series

November 6, 2008

Recap

Houston Rockets 99, Portland Trail Blazers 101 (OT)

Rose Garden, Portland, Oregon

February 24, 2009

Recap

Portland Trail Blazers 94, Houston Rockets 98

Toyota Center, Houston, Texas

April 5, 2009

Recap

Portland Trail Blazers 88, Houston Rockets 102

Toyota Center, Houston, Texas

This was the third playoff meeting between these two teams, with the Rockets winning the first two meetings.

Previous playoff series
Houston leads 2–0 in all-time playoff series

1987

Houston Rockets 3, Portland Trail Blazers 1

1987 Western Conference First Round

1994

Houston Rockets 3, Portland Trail Blazers 1

1994 Western Conference First Round

== Conference semifinals ==
=== Eastern Conference semifinals ===
==== (1) Cleveland Cavaliers vs. (4) Atlanta Hawks ====
TNT

May 5
8:00 p.m.

Recap

Atlanta Hawks 72, Cleveland Cavaliers 99
Scoring by quarter: 21–25, 23–24, 17–28, 11–22
Pts: Josh Smith 22; Rebs: Al Horford 8 Asts: Mike Bibby 8	Pts: LeBron James 34; Rebs: LeBron James 10; Asts: Delonte West 9
Cleveland leads series, 1–0

Quicken Loans Arena, Cleveland, Ohio
Attendance: 20,562
Referees: Steve Javie, Dick Bavetta, Bill Kennedy

ESPN

May 7
8:00 p.m.

Recap

Atlanta Hawks 85, Cleveland Cavaliers 105
Scoring by quarter: 17–26, 18–33, 20–26, 30–20
Pts: Maurice Evans 16; Rebs: Zaza Pachulia 12; Asts: Maurice Evans 4	Pts: LeBron James 27; Rebs: Anderson Varejão 8 Asts: James, Williams 5 each
Cleveland leads series, 2–0

Quicken Loans Arena, Cleveland, Ohio
Attendance: 20,562
Referees: Violet Palmer, Derrick Stafford, Dan Crawford

ABC

May 9
8:00 p.m.

Recap

Cleveland Cavaliers 97, Atlanta Hawks 82
Scoring by quarter: 22–18, 25–28, 25–19, 25–17
Pts: LeBron James 47; Rebs: LeBron James 12; Asts: LeBron James 8	Pts: Joe Johnson 17; Rebs: Smith, Johnson 5 each Asts: Mike Bibby 5
Cleveland leads series, 3–0

Philips Arena, Atlanta
Attendance: 20,143
Referees: Bill Spooner, Mike Callahan, Monty McCutchen

TNT

May 11
7:00 p.m.

Recap

Cleveland Cavaliers 84, Atlanta Hawks 74
Scoring by quarter: 15–22, 25–16, 22–19, 22–17
Pts: LeBron James 27; Rebs: Anderson Varejão 11; Asts: LeBron James 8	Pts: Josh Smith 26; Rebs: Josh Smith 8 Asts: Joe Johnson 7
Cleveland wins series, 4–0

Philips Arena, Atlanta
Attendance: 19,241
Referees: Ron Garretson, Scott Foster, James Capers

Regular-season series
Cleveland won 3–1 in the regular-season series

November 22, 2008

Recap

Atlanta Hawks 96, Cleveland Cavaliers 110

Quicken Loans Arena, Cleveland, Ohio

December 13, 2008

Recap

Cleveland Cavaliers 92, Atlanta Hawks 97

Philips Arena, Atlanta

March 1, 2009

Recap

Cleveland Cavaliers 88, Atlanta Hawks 87

Philips Arena, Atlanta

March 21, 2009

Recap

Atlanta Hawks 96, Cleveland Cavaliers 102

Quicken Loans Arena, Cleveland, Ohio

This was the first playoff meeting between the Hawks and the Cavaliers.

==== (2) Boston Celtics vs. (3) Orlando Magic ====
TNT

May 4
8:00 p.m.

Recap

Orlando Magic 95, Boston Celtics 90
Scoring by quarter: 24–19, 30–17, 24–26, 17–28
Pts: Rashard Lewis 18; Rebs: Dwight Howard 22; Asts: Rafer Alston 7	Pts: Paul Pierce 23; Rebs: Kendrick Perkins 16; Asts: Rajon Rondo 8
Orlando leads series, 1–0

TD Banknorth Garden, Boston
Attendance: 18,624
Referees: Ken Mauer, Mark Wunderlich, James Capers

TNT

May 6
8:00 p.m.

Recap

Orlando Magic 94, Boston Celtics 112
Scoring by quarter: 21–26, 25–35, 18–25, 30–26
Pts: Lewis, Piétrus 17 each Rebs: Dwight Howard 12; Asts: Anthony Johnson 7	Pts: Eddie House 31; Rebs: Rajon Rondo 11; Asts: Rajon Rondo 18
Series tied, 1–1

TD Banknorth Garden, Boston
Attendance: 18,624
Referees: Bennett Salvatore, Tom Washington, Eddie F. Rush

ESPN

May 8
7:00 p.m.

Recap

Boston Celtics 96, Orlando Magic 117
Scoring by quarter: 18–22, 23–31, 28–25, 27–39
Pts: Paul Pierce 27; Rebs: Kendrick Perkins 7 Asts: Pierce, Rondo 6 each	Pts: Rashard Lewis 28; Rebs: Dwight Howard 14; Asts: Hedo Türkoğlu 4
Orlando leads series, 2–1

Amway Arena, Orlando, Florida
Attendance: 17,461
Referees: Leon Wood, Scott Foster, Joe Derosa

TNT

May 10
8:00 p.m.

Recap

Boston Celtics 95, Orlando Magic 94
Scoring by quarter: 25–28, 23–18, 31–25, 16–23
Pts: Paul Pierce 27; Rebs: Rajon Rondo 14; Asts: Allen, Perkins 4 each	Pts: Dwight Howard 23; Rebs: Dwight Howard 17; Asts: JJ Redick 7
Series tied, 2–2

Amway Arena, Orlando, Florida
Attendance: 17,461
Referees: Joe Crawford, Bill Kennedy, Greg Willard

TNT

May 12
8:00 p.m.

Recap

Orlando Magic 88, Boston Celtics 92
Scoring by quarter: 22–16, 23–21, 22–22, 21–33
Pts: Rashard Lewis 19; Rebs: Dwight Howard 17; Asts: Hedo Türkoğlu 7	Pts: Glen Davis 22; Rebs: Kendrick Perkins 11; Asts: Paul Pierce 8
Boston leads series, 3–2

TD Banknorth Garden, Boston
Attendance: 18,624
Referees: Bill Spooner, Mike Callahan, Monty McCutchen

ESPN

May 14
7:00 p.m.

Recap

Boston Celtics 75, Orlando Magic 83
Scoring by quarter: 25–22, 21–23, 16–16, 13–22
Pts: Rajon Rondo 19; Rebs: Rajon Rondo 16; Asts: Rajon Rondo 6	Pts: Dwight Howard 23; Rebs: Dwight Howard 22; Asts: three players 3 each
Series tied, 3–3

Amway Arena, Orlando, Florida
Attendance: 17,461
Referees: Dan Crawford, Dick Bavetta, Marc Davis

TNT

May 17
8:00 p.m.

Recap

Orlando Magic 101, Boston Celtics 82
Scoring by quarter: 27–17, 18–21, 21–23, 35–21
Pts: Hedo Türkoğlu 25; Rebs: Dwight Howard 16; Asts: Hedo Türkoğlu 12	Pts: Ray Allen 23; Rebs: Kendrick Perkins 15; Asts: Rajon Rondo 10
Orlando wins series, 4–3

TD Banknorth Garden, Boston
Attendance: 18,624
Referees: Steve Javie, Derrick Stafford, Scott Foster

This was the first time the Celtics lost a series when leading 3–2. Game 7 is Stephon Marbury's last NBA game.

Regular-season series
Tied 2–2 in the regular-season series

December 1, 2008

Recap

Orlando Magic 88, Boston Celtics 107

TD Banknorth Garden, Boston

January 22, 2009

Recap

Boston Celtics 90, Orlando Magic 80

Amway Arena, Orlando, Florida

March 8, 2009

Recap

Orlando Magic 86, Boston Celtics 79

TD Banknorth Garden, Boston

March 25, 2009

Recap

Boston Celtics 82, Orlando Magic 84

Amway Arena, Orlando, Florida

This was the second playoff meeting between these two teams, with the Magic winning the first meeting.

Previous playoff series
Orlando leads 1–0 in all-time playoff series

1995

Boston Celtics 1, Orlando Magic 3

1995 Eastern Conference First Round

=== Western Conference semifinals ===
==== (1) Los Angeles Lakers vs. (5) Houston Rockets ====
TNT

May 4
10:30 p.m.

Recap

Houston Rockets 100, Los Angeles Lakers 92
Scoring by quarter: 21–18, 22–22, 27–27, 30–25
Pts: Yao Ming 28; Rebs: Yao Ming 10; Asts: Ron Artest 7	Pts: Kobe Bryant 32; Rebs: Pau Gasol 13; Asts: Bryant, Gasol 4 each
Houston leads series, 1–0

Staples Center, Los Angeles
Attendance: 18,997
Referees: Scott Foster, Joe Derosa, Tony Brothers

TNT

May 6
10:30 p.m.

Recap

Houston Rockets 98, Los Angeles Lakers 111
Scoring by quarter: 25–39, 32–18, 20–29, 21–25
Pts: Ron Artest 25; Rebs: Yao, Landry 10 each Asts: Ron Artest 5	Pts: Kobe Bryant 40; Rebs: Pau Gasol 14; Asts: Luke Walton 5
Series tied, 1–1

Staples Center, Los Angeles
Attendance: 18,997
Referees: Joe Crawford, Bill Spooner, Greg Willard

ESPN

May 8
9:30 p.m.

Recap

Los Angeles Lakers 108, Houston Rockets 94
Scoring by quarter: 30–28, 20–18, 24–16, 34–32
Pts: Kobe Bryant 33; Rebs: Lamar Odom 13; Asts: Jordan Farmar 7	Pts: Ron Artest 25; Rebs: Yao Ming 14; Asts: Shane Battier 7
LA Lakers lead series, 2–1

Toyota Center, Houston, Texas
Attendance: 18,495
Referees: Steve Javie, Ron Garretson, Sean Corbin

ABC

May 10
3:30 p.m.

Recap

Los Angeles Lakers 87, Houston Rockets 99
Scoring by quarter: 16–29, 20–25, 18–29, 33–16
Pts: Pau Gasol 30; Rebs: Pau Gasol 9 Asts: Kobe Bryant 5	Pts: Aaron Brooks 34; Rebs: Luis Scola 14; Asts: Ron Artest 6
Series tied, 2–2

Toyota Center, Houston, Texas
Attendance: 18,313
Referees: Dan Crawford, Dick Bavetta, Michael Smith

TNT

May 12
10:30 p.m.

Recap

Houston Rockets 78, Los Angeles Lakers 118
Scoring by quarter: 24–35, 15–29, 15–30, 24–24
Pts: Aaron Brooks 14; Rebs: Luis Scola 13; Asts: Scola, Lowry 4 each	Pts: Kobe Bryant 26; Rebs: Pau Gasol 13; Asts: Jordan Farmar 6
LA Lakers lead series, 3–2

Staples Center, Los Angeles
Attendance: 18,997
Referees: Bennett Salvatore, Derrick Stafford, Ken Mauer

ESPN

May 14
9:30 p.m.

Recap

Los Angeles Lakers 80, Houston Rockets 95
Scoring by quarter: 15–27, 21–25, 29–22, 15–21
Pts: Kobe Bryant 32; Rebs: Lamar Odom 14; Asts: Kobe Bryant 3	Pts: Aaron Brooks 26; Rebs: Luis Scola 12; Asts: three players 4 each
Series tied, 3–3

Toyota Center, Houston, Texas
Attendance: 18,501
Referees: Mark Wunderlich, Tom Washington, Monty McCutchen

ABC

May 17
3:30 p.m.

Recap

Houston Rockets 70, Los Angeles Lakers 89
Scoring by quarter: 12–22, 19–29, 19–18, 20–20
Pts: Aaron Brooks 13; Rebs: Ron Artest 8 Asts: Ron Artest 5	Pts: Pau Gasol 21; Rebs: Pau Gasol 18; Asts: Kobe Bryant 5
LA Lakers win series, 4–3

Staples Center, Los Angeles
Attendance: 18,997
Referees: Joe Crawford, Mike Callahan, Dan Crawford

Regular-season series
Los Angeles won 4–0 in the regular-season series

November 9, 2008

Recap

Houston Rockets 82, Los Angeles Lakers 111

Staples Center, Los Angeles

January 13, 2009

Recap

Los Angeles Lakers 105, Houston Rockets 100

Toyota Center, Houston, Texas

March 11, 2009

Recap

Los Angeles Lakers 102, Houston Rockets 96

Toyota Center, Houston, Texas

April 3, 2009

Recap

Houston Rockets 81, Los Angeles Lakers 93

Staples Center, Los Angeles

This was the eighth playoff meeting between these two teams, with the Lakers winning four of the first seven meetings.

Previous playoff series
Los Angeles leads 4–3 in all-time playoff series

1981

Houston Rockets 2, Los Angeles Lakers 1

1981 Western Conference First Round

1986

Houston Rockets 4, Los Angeles Lakers 1

1986 Western Conference Finals

1990

Houston Rockets 1, Los Angeles Lakers 3

1990 Western Conference First Round

1991

Houston Rockets 0, Los Angeles Lakers 3

1991 Western Conference First Round

1996

Houston Rockets 3, Los Angeles Lakers 1

1996 Western Conference First Round

1999

Houston Rockets 1, Los Angeles Lakers 3

1999 Western Conference First Round

2004

Houston Rockets 1, Los Angeles Lakers 4

2004 Western Conference First Round

==== (2) Denver Nuggets vs. (6) Dallas Mavericks ====
ABC

May 3
3:30 p.m.

Recap

Dallas Mavericks 95, Denver Nuggets 109
Scoring by quarter: 24–16, 23–35, 28–31, 20–27
Pts: Dirk Nowitzki 28; Rebs: Dirk Nowitzki 10; Asts: José Juan Barea 5	Pts: Nenê 24; Rebs: Chris Andersen 6 Asts: Billups, Smith 6 each
Denver leads series, 1–0

Pepsi Center, Denver, Colorado
Attendance: 19,631
Referees: David Jones, Tom Washington, Dan Crawford

TNT

May 5
10:30 p.m.

Recap

Dallas Mavericks 105, Denver Nuggets 117
Scoring by quarter: 22–30, 33–28, 28–28, 22–31
Pts: Dirk Nowitzki 35; Rebs: Dirk Nowitzki 9 Asts: Jason Kidd 7	Pts: Anthony, Nenê 25 each Rebs: Chris Andersen 9 Asts: Chauncey Billups 8
Denver leads series, 2–0

Pepsi Center, Denver, Colorado
Attendance: 19,890
Referees: Ed Malloy, Mike Callahan, Monty McCutchen

ESPN

May 9
5:00 p.m.

Recap

Denver Nuggets 106, Dallas Mavericks 105
Scoring by quarter: 20–20, 28–25, 31–35, 27–25
Pts: Chauncey Billups 32; Rebs: Nenê, Anthony 8 each Asts: Nenê 4	Pts: Dirk Nowitzki 33; Rebs: Dirk Nowitzki 16; Asts: Jason Kidd 5
Denver leads series, 3–0

American Airlines Center, Dallas
Attendance: 20,620
Referees: Ken Mauer, Bennett Salvatore, Mark Wunderlich

TNT

May 11
9:30 p.m.

Recap

Denver Nuggets 117, Dallas Mavericks 119
Scoring by quarter: 34–23, 27–30, 29–32, 27–34
Pts: Carmelo Anthony 41; Rebs: Carmelo Anthony 11; Asts: Chauncey Billups 7	Pts: Dirk Nowitzki 44; Rebs: Dirk Nowitzki 13; Asts: Jason Kidd 6
Denver leads series, 3–1

American Airlines Center, Dallas
Attendance: 20,523
Referees: Joe Derosa, Marc Davis, Steve Javie

TNT

May 13
9:00 p.m.

Recap

Dallas Mavericks 110, Denver Nuggets 124
Scoring by quarter: 27–34, 28–35, 25–25, 30–30
Pts: Dirk Nowitzki 32; Rebs: Dirk Nowitzki 10; Asts: Jason Kidd 9	Pts: Carmelo Anthony 30; Rebs: Billups, Nenê 7 each Asts: Chauncey Billups 12
Denver wins series, 4–1

Pepsi Center, Denver, Colorado
Attendance: 19,962
Referees: Bill Kennedy, Joe Crawford, Ron Garretson

Regular-season series
Denver won 4–0 in the regular-season series

November 7, 2008

Recap

Dallas Mavericks 105, Denver Nuggets 108

Pepsi Center, Denver, Colorado

December 15, 2008

Recap

Denver Nuggets 98, Dallas Mavericks 88

American Airlines Center, Dallas

January 13, 2009

Recap

Dallas Mavericks 97, Denver Nuggets 99

Pepsi Center, Denver, Colorado

March 27, 2009

Recap

Denver Nuggets 103, Dallas Mavericks 101

American Airlines Center, Dallas

This was the second playoff meeting between these two teams, with the Mavericks winning the first meeting.

Previous playoff series
Dallas leads 1–0 in all-time playoff series

1988

Dallas Mavericks 4, Denver Nuggets 2

1988 Western Conference Semifinals

== Conference finals ==
=== Eastern Conference finals ===
==== (1) Cleveland Cavaliers vs. (3) Orlando Magic ====
TNT

May 20
8:30 p.m.

Recap

Orlando Magic 107, Cleveland Cavaliers 106
Scoring by quarter: 19–33, 29–30, 30–19, 29–24
Pts: Dwight Howard 30; Rebs: Dwight Howard 13; Asts: Hedo Türkoğlu 14	Pts: LeBron James 49; Rebs: Žydrūnas Ilgauskas 10; Asts: LeBron James 8
Orlando leads series, 1–0

Quicken Loans Arena, Cleveland, Ohio
Attendance: 20,562
Referees: Bennett Salvatore, Ken Mauer, Ron Garretson

TNT

May 22
8:30 p.m.

Recap

Orlando Magic 95, Cleveland Cavaliers 96
Scoring by quarter: 16–30, 28–26, 25–19, 26–21
Pts: Rashard Lewis 23; Rebs: Dwight Howard 18; Asts: three players 4 each	Pts: LeBron James 35; Rebs: Žydrūnas Ilgauskas 15; Asts: James, Williams 5 each
Series tied, 1–1

Quicken Loans Arena, Cleveland, Ohio
Attendance: 20,562
Referees: Tom Washington, Monty McCutchen, Bill Kennedy

TNT

May 24
8:30 p.m.

Recap

Cleveland Cavaliers 89, Orlando Magic 99
Scoring by quarter: 17–24, 24–18, 22–26, 26–31
Pts: LeBron James 41; Rebs: Žydrūnas Ilgauskas 9 Asts: LeBron James 9	Pts: Dwight Howard 24; Rebs: Hedo Türkoğlu 10; Asts: Hedo Türkoğlu 7
Orlando leads series, 2–1

Amway Arena, Orlando, Florida
Attendance: 17,461
Referees: Greg Willard, Joe Crawford, Mark Wunderlich

TNT

May 26
8:30 p.m.

Recap

Cleveland Cavaliers 114, Orlando Magic 116 (OT)
Scoring by quarter: 25–21, 33–29, 21–28, 21–22, Overtime: 14–16
Pts: LeBron James 44; Rebs: LeBron James 12; Asts: James, West 7 each	Pts: Dwight Howard 27; Rebs: Dwight Howard 14; Asts: Hedo Türkoğlu 8
Orlando leads series, 3–1

Amway Arena, Orlando, Florida
Attendance: 17,461
Referees: Mike Callahan, Scott Foster, Joe DeRosa

TNT

May 28
8:30 p.m.

Recap

Orlando Magic 102, Cleveland Cavaliers 112
Scoring by quarter: 18–35, 37–21, 24–22, 23–34
Pts: Hedo Türkoğlu 29; Rebs: Dwight Howard 10; Asts: Rafer Alston 4	Pts: LeBron James 37; Rebs: LeBron James 14; Asts: LeBron James 12
Orlando leads series, 3–2

Quicken Loans Arena, Cleveland, Ohio
Attendance: 20,562
Referees: Bill Spooner, Dan Crawford, Marc Davis

TNT

May 30
8:30 p.m.

Recap

Cleveland Cavaliers 90, Orlando Magic 103
Scoring by quarter: 25–30, 15–28, 30–28, 20–17
Pts: LeBron James 25; Rebs: Anderson Varejão 8 Asts: LeBron James 7	Pts: Dwight Howard 40; Rebs: Dwight Howard 14; Asts: Hedo Türkoğlu 5
Orlando wins series, 4–2

Amway Arena, Orlando, Florida
Attendance: 17,461
Referees: Steve Javie, Bennett Salvatore, Derrick Stafford

Regular-season series
Orlando won 2–1 in the regular-season series

January 29, 2009

Recap

Cleveland Cavaliers 88, Orlando Magic 99

Amway Arena, Orlando, Florida

March 17, 2009

Recap

Orlando Magic 93, Cleveland Cavaliers 97

Quicken Loans Arena, Cleveland, Ohio

April 3, 2009

Recap

Cleveland Cavaliers 87, Orlando Magic 116

Amway Arena, Orlando, Florida

This was the first playoff meeting between the Cavaliers and the Magic.

In Game 1, LeBron James dominated with a 49-point performance, while Howard had 30. Early in the game, Howard made a thunderous jam that caused the shot clock to fall backwards. Although James had a potential game-winning three-point play, a furious rally and a game-winning three-pointer by Rashard Lewis allowed the Magic to escape with a victory in game 1. Much like Game 1, Game 2 had the Cavs with an 18-point lead by the second quarter, only for the Magic to rally back in the closing minutes. A jump shot by Hedo Türkoğlu gave the Magic a 2-point lead with 1 second left on the clock, but LeBron James hit a three-pointer to tie the series at the buzzer. In Game 3, the Magic dominated at home, leading to a 10-point victory behind Dwight Howard's 24 points. In Game 4, two clutch free throws by LeBron James sent the game into overtime. While James dominated with 44 (his third 40-point game of the playoffs), an off half-court shot allowed the Magic to escape again with a victory. Down 3–1, James' triple-double allowed his team to stave off elimination in Game 5. After a win in Game 6, the Magic received their second NBA Finals berth in franchise history.

=== Western Conference finals ===
==== (1) Los Angeles Lakers vs. (2) Denver Nuggets ====
ESPN

May 19
9:00 p.m.

Recap

Denver Nuggets 103, Los Angeles Lakers 105
Scoring by quarter: 31–23, 23–32, 22–19, 27–31
Pts: Carmelo Anthony 39; Rebs: Kenyon Martin 8 Asts: Chauncey Billups 8	Pts: Kobe Bryant 40; Rebs: Pau Gasol 14; Asts: Derek Fisher 6
LA Lakers lead series, 1–0

Staples Center, Los Angeles
Attendance: 18,997
Referees: Scott Foster, Tony Brothers, Joe Derosa

ESPN

May 21
9:00 p.m.

Recap

Denver Nuggets 106, Los Angeles Lakers 103
Scoring by quarter: 23–31, 31–24, 26–26, 26–22
Pts: Carmelo Anthony 34; Rebs: Anthony, Nenê 9 each Asts: Nenê 6	Pts: Kobe Bryant 32; Rebs: Pau Gasol 17; Asts: Luke Walton 4
Series tied, 1–1

Staples Center, Los Angeles
Attendance: 18,997
Referees: Dick Bavetta, Marc Davis, Steve Javie

ABC

May 23
8:30 p.m.

Recap

Los Angeles Lakers 103, Denver Nuggets 97
Scoring by quarter: 26–28, 22–24, 23–27, 32–18
Pts: Kobe Bryant 41; Rebs: Pau Gasol 11; Asts: Kobe Bryant 5	Pts: Carmelo Anthony 21; Rebs: Andersen, Martin 7 each Asts: Chauncey Billups 7
LA Lakers lead series, 2–1

Pepsi Center, Denver, Colorado
Attendance: 19,939
Referees: Derrick Stafford, Dan Crawford, James Capers

ESPN

May 25
9:00 p.m.

Recap

Los Angeles Lakers 101, Denver Nuggets 120
Scoring by quarter: 19–22, 26–30, 21–25, 35–43
Pts: Kobe Bryant 34; Rebs: Pau Gasol 10; Asts: Bryant, Walton 5 each	Pts: Billups, Smith 24 each Rebs: Kenyon Martin 15; Asts: Nenê 6
Series tied, 2–2

Pepsi Center, Denver, Colorado
Attendance: 20,037
Referees: Ken Mauer, Bill Spooner, Bennett Salvatore

ESPN

May 27
9:00 p.m.

Recap

Denver Nuggets 94, Los Angeles Lakers 103
Scoring by quarter: 25–25, 31–31, 20–20, 18–27
Pts: Carmelo Anthony 31; Rebs: Nenê, Andersen 8 each Asts: Chauncey Billups 5	Pts: Kobe Bryant 22; Rebs: Lamar Odom 14; Asts: Kobe Bryant 8
LA Lakers lead series, 3–2

Staples Center, Los Angeles
Attendance: 18,997
Referees: Monty McCutchen, Ron Garretson, Tom Washington

ESPN

May 29
9:00 p.m.

Recap

Los Angeles Lakers 119, Denver Nuggets 92
Scoring by quarter: 25–20, 28–20, 30–27, 36–25
Pts: Kobe Bryant 35; Rebs: Pau Gasol 12; Asts: Kobe Bryant 10	Pts: Carmelo Anthony 25; Rebs: Nenê 6 Asts: Chauncey Billups 9
LA Lakers win series, 4–2

Pepsi Center, Denver, Colorado
Attendance: 20,037
Referees: Joe Crawford, Mike Callahan, Mark Wunderlich

Regular-season series
Los Angeles won 3–1 in the regular-season series

November 1, 2008

Recap

Los Angeles Lakers 104, Denver Nuggets 97

Pepsi Center, Denver, Colorado

November 21, 2008

Recap

Denver Nuggets 90, Los Angeles Lakers 104

Staples Center, Los Angeles

February 27, 2009

Recap

Los Angeles Lakers 79, Denver Nuggets 90

Pepsi Center, Denver, Colorado

April 9, 2009

Recap

Denver Nuggets 102, Los Angeles Lakers 116

Staples Center, Los Angeles

This was the fifth playoff meeting between these two teams, with the Lakers winning the first four meetings.

Before the playoff matchup had happened, professional wrestling promotion World Wrestling Entertainment had booked its television program Monday Night Raw on August 15, 2008, at the Pepsi Center by Vince McMahon for May 25, 2009 show. Because the Nuggets needed the arena for games 3, 4 and 6, the WWE had decided to relocate Raw (and later the Friday Night SmackDown/ECW tapings) to Staples Center, the site of games 1, 2, 5 and 7 and Denver was given a house show on August 7 instead. The debacle would be a subject of a main event that night in a 10-man tag team match when a babyface team of John Cena, Batista, Montel Vontavious Porter, Jerry Lawler and Mr. Kennedy donning Lakers jerseys took on heels The Legacy (Randy Orton, Cody Rhodes and Ted DiBiase, Jr.) and ShoMiz (The Big Show and The Miz) in Nuggets jerseys. Team Lakers would emerge victorious afterwards.

Previous playoff series
Los Angeles leads 4–0 in all-time playoff series

1979

Denver Nuggets 1, Los Angeles Lakers 2

1979 Western Conference First Round

1985

Denver Nuggets 1, Los Angeles Lakers 4

1985 Western Conference Finals

1987

Denver Nuggets 0, Los Angeles Lakers 3

1987 Western Conference First Round

2008

Denver Nuggets 0, Los Angeles Lakers 4

2008 Western Conference First Round

== NBA Finals: (W1) Los Angeles Lakers vs. (E3) Orlando Magic ==
ABC

June 4
9:00 p.m.

Recap

Orlando Magic 75, Los Angeles Lakers 100
Scoring by quarter: 24–22, 19–31, 15–29, 17–18
Pts: Mickaël Piétrus 14; Rebs: Dwight Howard 15; Asts: Jameer Nelson 4	Pts: Kobe Bryant 40; Rebs: Lamar Odom 14; Asts: Kobe Bryant 8
LA Lakers lead series, 1–0

Staples Center, Los Angeles
Attendance: 18,997
Referees: Ken Mauer, Dan Crawford, Joe DeRosa

ABC

June 7
8:00 p.m.

Recap

Orlando Magic 96, Los Angeles Lakers 101 (OT)
Scoring by quarter: 15–15, 20–25, 30–23, 23–25, Overtime: 8–13
Pts: Rashard Lewis 34; Rebs: Dwight Howard 16; Asts: Rashard Lewis 7	Pts: Kobe Bryant 29; Rebs: Pau Gasol 10; Asts: Kobe Bryant 8
LA Lakers lead series, 2–0

Staples Center, Los Angeles
Attendance: 18,997
Referees: Monty McCutchen, Steve Javie, Tom Washington

ABC

June 9
9:00 p.m.

Recap

Los Angeles Lakers 104, Orlando Magic 108
Scoring by quarter: 31–27, 23–32, 21–22, 29–27
Pts: Kobe Bryant 31; Rebs: Trevor Ariza 7 Asts: Kobe Bryant 8	Pts: Howard, Lewis 21 each Rebs: Dwight Howard 14; Asts: Hedo Türkoğlu 7
LA Lakers lead series, 2–1

Amway Arena, Orlando, Florida
Attendance: 17,461
Referees: Joe Crawford, Derrick Stafford, Mark Wunderlich

ABC

June 11
9:00 p.m.

Recap

Los Angeles Lakers 99, Orlando Magic 91 (OT)
Scoring by quarter: 20–24, 17–25, 30–14, 20–24, Overtime: 12–4
Pts: Kobe Bryant 32; Rebs: Pau Gasol 10; Asts: Kobe Bryant 8	Pts: Hedo Türkoğlu 25; Rebs: Dwight Howard 21; Asts: Rashard Lewis 4
LA Lakers lead series, 3–1

Amway Arena, Orlando, Florida
Attendance: 17,461
Referees: Bennett Salvatore, Mike Callahan, Scott Foster

ABC

June 14
8:00 p.m.

Recap

Los Angeles Lakers 99, Orlando Magic 86
Scoring by quarter: 26–28, 30–18, 20–15, 23–25
Pts: Kobe Bryant 30; Rebs: Pau Gasol 15; Asts: Kobe Bryant 5	Pts: Rashard Lewis 18; Rebs: Howard, Lewis 10 each Asts: Lewis, Nelson 4 each
LA Lakers win series, 4–1

Amway Arena, Orlando, Florida
Attendance: 17,461
Referees: Dan Crawford, Joe DeRosa, Ken Mauer

Regular-season series
Orlando won 2–0 in the regular-season series

December 20, 2008

Recap

Los Angeles Lakers 103, Orlando Magic 106

Amway Arena, Orlando, Florida

January 16, 2009

Recap

Orlando Magic 109, Los Angeles Lakers 103

Staples Center, Los Angeles

This was the first playoff meeting between the Lakers and the Magic.

== Statistic leader board ==
Category	High			Average			
Category	Player	Team	Total	Player	Team	Avg.	GP
Points	Ray Allen	Boston Celtics	51	LeBron James	Cleveland Cavaliers	35.3	14
Rebounds	Dwight Howard	Orlando Magic	24	Dwight Howard	Orlando Magic	15.3	23
Assists	Rajon Rondo	Boston Celtics	19	Deron Williams	Utah Jazz	10.8	5
Steals	Glen Davis	Boston Celtics	6	Mario Chalmers	Miami Heat	2.9	7
Blocks	Dwight Howard	Orlando Magic	9	Tyrus Thomas	Chicago Bulls	2.9	7
