= 2008–09 Minnesota Timberwolves season =

NBA professional basketball team season

- Head coach: Randy Wittman (fired); Kevin McHale
- General manager: Kevin McHale
- Owner: Glen Taylor
- Arena: Target Center

Results
- Record: 24–58 (.293)
- Place: Division: 4th (Northwest); Conference: 12th (Western)
- Playoff finish: Did not qualify
- Stats at Basketball Reference

Local media
- Television: Fox Sports North; KSTC
- Radio: KFAN

The 2008–09 Minnesota Timberwolves season was the 20th season of the franchise in the National Basketball Association (NBA). The team finished the season coached by Kevin McHale. After the season, McHale was dismissed though he would return as head coach for the Houston Rockets for the shortened 2011–12 season and would later guide the Rockets to the Western Conference Finals in 2015.

== Draft picks ==
Round	Pick	Player	Position	Nationality	College
1	3	O. J. Mayo (traded to Memphis)	SG	United States	USC (fr.)
2	31	Nikola Peković	PF	Montenegro	Panathinaikos (Greece) 1986
2	34	Mario Chalmers (traded to Miami)	PG	United States	Kansas (jr.)

The Timberwolves entered the draft with three draft picks: two original picks (#3 and #34) and an additional pick (#31) that originally belonged to the Miami Heat and was acquired from the Boston Celtics via trade in 2006. The team drafted O. J. Mayo with the third pick in the first round. Soon, his rights were traded to the Memphis Grizzlies for the fifth pick, Kevin Love. In the second round, the team drafted Nikola Pekovic with the 31st pick, though he didn't join the team until 2010, and Mario Chalmers with the 34th pick, but his rights were soon traded to the Miami Heat, where he would win two championships.

== Roster ==
2008–09 Minnesota Timberwolves roster
Players

Pos.	No.	Player	Height	Weight	DOB	From
SF	22	Corey Brewer (injured)	6 ft 9 in (2.06 m)	185 lb (84 kg)	1986-03-05	Florida
PG	1	Bobby Brown	6 ft 2 in (1.88 m)	175 lb (79 kg)	1984-09-24	Cal State Fullerton
PF	14	Brian Cardinal	6 ft 8 in (2.03 m)	245 lb (111 kg)	1977-05-02	Purdue
SG	10	Rodney Carney	6 ft 7 in (2.01 m)	204 lb (93 kg)	1984-04-15	Memphis
C	34	Jason Collins	7 ft 0 in (2.13 m)	255 lb (116 kg)	1978-12-02	Stanford
SG	4	Randy Foye (injured)	6 ft 4 in (1.93 m)	213 lb (97 kg)	1983-09-24	Villanova
SF	8	Ryan Gomes	6 ft 7 in (2.01 m)	250 lb (113 kg)	1982-09-01	Providence
C	25	Al Jefferson (injured)	6 ft 10 in (2.08 m)	256 lb (116 kg)	1985-01-04	Prentiss HS (MS)
C	42	Kevin Love	6 ft 8 in (2.03 m)	255 lb (116 kg)	1988-09-07	UCLA
C	35	Mark Madsen	6 ft 9 in (2.06 m)	250 lb (113 kg)	1976-01-28	Stanford
SF	33	Mike Miller	6 ft 8 in (2.03 m)	218 lb (99 kg)	1980-02-19	Florida
PG	12	Kevin Ollie	6 ft 2 in (1.88 m)	195 lb (88 kg)	1972-12-27	Connecticut
PF	5	Craig Smith	6 ft 8 in (2.03 m)	270 lb (122 kg)	1983-11-10	Boston College
PG	3	Sebastian Telfair	6 ft 0 in (1.83 m)	175 lb (79 kg)	1985-06-09	Lincoln HS (NY)
PF	23	Shelden Williams	6 ft 9 in (2.06 m)	250 lb (113 kg)	1983-10-21	Duke

Coaches
Head coach
- Randy Wittman (fired)
- Kevin McHale
Assistant(s)
- J. B. Bickerstaff
- Dean Cooper
- Brent Haskins
- Ed Pinckney
- Jerry Sichting
- Gregg Farnam (trainer)

Legend
- (DP) Unsigned draft pick
- (FA) Free agent
- (S) Suspended
- (DL) On assignment to D-League affiliate
- Injured

Roster
Updated: March 1, 2009

== Regular season ==
=== Standings ===
Northwest Division	W	L	PCT	GB	Home	Road	Div	GP
y–Denver Nuggets	54	28	.659	—	33–8	21–20	12–4	82
x–Portland Trail Blazers	54	28	.659	—	34–7	20–21	11–5	82
x–Utah Jazz	48	34	.585	6	33–8	15–26	10–6	82
Minnesota Timberwolves	24	58	.293	30	11–30	13–28	3–13	82
Oklahoma City Thunder	23	59	.280	31	15–26	8–33	4–12	82

#	Western Conference				
#	Team	W	L	PCT	GB
1	c-Los Angeles Lakers	65	17	.793	—
2	y-Denver Nuggets	54	28	.659	11
3	y-San Antonio Spurs	54	28	.659	11
4	x-Portland Trail Blazers	54	28	.659	11
5	x-Houston Rockets	53	29	.646	12
6	x-Dallas Mavericks	50	32	.610	15
7	x-New Orleans Hornets	49	33	.598	16
8	x-Utah Jazz	48	34	.585	17
9	Phoenix Suns	46	36	.561	19
10	Golden State Warriors	29	53	.354	36
11	Memphis Grizzlies	24	58	.293	41
12	Minnesota Timberwolves	24	58	.293	41
13	Oklahoma City Thunder	23	59	.280	42
14	Los Angeles Clippers	19	63	.232	46
15	Sacramento Kings	17	65	.207	48

=== Game log ===
2008–09 game log
October: 1–0 (home: 1–0; road: 0–0)

Game	Date	Team	Score	High points	High rebounds	High assists	Location Attendance	Record
1	October 29	Sacramento	W 98–96	Al Jefferson (21)	Al Jefferson (10)	Mike Miller (6)	Target Center; 17,820	1–0

November: 3–11 (home: 1–6; road: 2–5)

Game	Date	Team	Score	High points	High rebounds	High assists	Location Attendance	Record
2	November 1	Dallas	L 85–95	Rashad McCants (18)	Al Jefferson (12)	Randy Foye (6)	Target Center; 16,893	1–1
3	November 2	@ Oklahoma City	L 85–88	Al Jefferson (24)	Al Jefferson (13)	Randy Foye (6)	Ford Center; 18,163	1–2
4	November 5	San Antonio	L 125–129 (2OT)	Al Jefferson (30)	Al Jefferson (14)	Sebastian Telfair (10)	Target Center; 11,112	1–3
5	November 7	@ Sacramento	L 109–121	Kevin Love (20)	Al Jefferson (9)	Sebastian Telfair (7)	ARCO Arena; 10,592	1–4
6	November 8	@ Portland	L 93–97	Al Jefferson (27)	Kevin Love (7)	Al Jefferson, Randy Foye (5)	Rose Garden; 20,599	1–5
7	November 11	@ Golden State	L 110–113 (OT)	Al Jefferson (25)	Al Jefferson (12)	Randy Foye (8)	Oracle Arena; 17,422	1–6
8	November 15	Portland	L 83–88	Al Jefferson (26)	Al Jefferson (6)	Mike Miller (5)	Target Center; 12,213	1–7
9	November 16	@ Denver	L 84–90	Al Jefferson (20)	Al Jefferson (14)	Randy Foye (6)	Pepsi Center; 16,721	1–8
10	November 19	Philadelphia	W 102–96	Al Jefferson (25)	Mike Miller (10)	Sebastian Telfair (8)	Target Center; 10,111	2–8
11	November 21	Boston	L 78–95	Al Jefferson (21)	Craig Smith (7)	Craig Smith (4)	Target Center; 19,107	2–9
12	November 23	@ Detroit	W 106–80	Randy Foye (23)	Craig Smith (9)	Randy Foye (14)	The Palace of Auburn Hills; 22,076	3–9
13	November 26	Phoenix	L 102–110	Al Jefferson (28)	Al Jefferson (17)	Mike Miller (6)	Target Center; 11,708	3–10
14	November 28	@ Oklahoma City	W 105–103	Craig Smith (23)	Al Jefferson (9)	Randy Foye (7)	Ford Center; 18,229	4–10
15	November 29	Denver	L 97–106	Randy Foye (25)	Al Jefferson (13)	Randy Foye (6)	Target Center; 14,197	4–11

December: 2–14 (home: 1–6; road: 1–8)

Game	Date	Team	Score	High points	High rebounds	High assists	Location Attendance	Record
16	December 1	@ Charlotte	L 90–100	Randy Foye (23)	Mike Miller (10)	Mike Miller (5)	Time Warner Cable Arena; 9,285	4–12
17	December 3	@ Orlando	L 89–100	Al Jefferson (19)	Kevin Love (12)	Randy Foye (5)	Amway Arena; 15,705	4–13
18	December 5	@ New Jersey	L 84–113	Randy Foye (20)	Al Jefferson (12)	Randy Foye (5)	Izod Center; 15,364	4–14
19	December 6	L.A. Clippers	L 84–107	Al Jefferson (28)	Kevin Love (15)	Randy Foye, Sebastian Telfair (5)	Target Center; 10,863	4–15
20	December 9	Utah	L 96–99	Al Jefferson (21)	Kevin Love (15)	Randy Foye, Ryan Gomes (4)	Target Center; 10,745	4–16
21	December 10	@ Denver	L 105–116	Al Jefferson, Randy Foye (26)	Kevin Love (14)	Randy Foye (6)	Pepsi Center; 14,007	4–17
22	December 12	San Antonio	L 86–98	Al Jefferson (29)	Al Jefferson (13)	Randy Foye (6)	Target Center; 15,336	4–18
23	December 14	@ L.A. Lakers	L 86–98	Al Jefferson (20)	Al Jefferson (13)	Randy Foye (6)	Staples Center; 18,997	4–19
24	December 15	@ Sacramento	L 103–118	Al Jefferson (22)	Kevin Love (15)	Kevin Ollie (5)	ARCO Arena; 10,593	4–20
25	December 17	Cleveland	L 70–93	Al Jefferson (20)	Al Jefferson (11)	Randy Foye (3)	Target Center; 14,899	4–21
26	December 20	Houston	L 102–109	Al Jefferson (34)	Al Jefferson (13)	Al Jefferson, Rashad McCants (4)	Target Center; 12,115	4–22
27	December 23	@ San Antonio	L 93–99	Al Jefferson (28)	Randy Foye (16)	Kevin Ollie (4)	AT&T Center; 17,996	4–23
28	December 26	@ New York	W 120–107	Rashad McCants (23)	Al Jefferson (15)	Sebastian Telfair (8)	Madison Square Garden; 19,763	5–23
29	December 27	Orlando	L 94–118	Rashad McCants (21)	Kevin Love (10)	Rashad McCants (4)	Target Center; 17,003	5–24
30	December 29	Memphis	W 108–98 (OT)	Al Jefferson (38)	Al Jefferson (16)	Randy Foye, Craig Smith (5)	Target Center; 12,207	6–24
31	December 30	@ Dallas	L 100–107	Al Jefferson (21)	Al Jefferson (9)	Kevin Ollie (6)	American Airlines Center; 20,264	6–25

January: 10–4 (home: 5–3; road: 5–1)

Game	Date	Team	Score	High points	High rebounds	High assists	Location Attendance	Record
32	January 2	Golden State	W 115–108	Al Jefferson (32)	Al Jefferson, Ryan Gomes (10)	Randy Foye (7)	Target Center; 11,921	7–25
33	January 3	@ Chicago	W 102–92	Randy Foye (21)	Al Jefferson (14)	Sebastian Telfair (6)	United Center; 20,516	8–25
34	January 6	@ Memphis	W 94–87	Randy Foye (23)	Al Jefferson (12)	Sebastian Telfair (9)	FedExForum; 10,156	9–25
35	January 7	Oklahoma City	W 129–87	Randy Foye (32)	Kevin Love (15)	Randy Foye (6)	Target Center; 10,272	10–25
36	January 10	Milwaukee	W 106–104	Rodney Carney (22)	Kevin Love (12)	Sebastian Telfair (11)	Target Center; 15,007	11–25
37	January 13	Miami	L 96–99	Randy Foye (29)	Al Jefferson (10)	Randy Foye (8)	Target Center; 10,856	11–26
38	January 16	@ Phoenix	W 105–103	Al Jefferson (22)	Kevin Love (14)	Mike Miller (5)	US Airways Center; 18,422	12–26
39	January 19	@ L.A. Clippers	W 94–86	Al Jefferson, Craig Smith (20)	Al Jefferson (17)	Sebastian Telfair (9)	Staples Center; 14,399	13–26
40	January 20	@ Utah	L 107–112	Al Jefferson (25)	Kevin Love (9)	Sebastian Telfair (9)	EnergySolutions Arena; 19,911	13–27
41	January 23	New Orleans	W 116–108	Al Jefferson, Randy Foye (24)	Al Jefferson (14)	Randy Foye, Sebastian Telfair (8)	Target Center; 18,224	14–27
42	January 25	Chicago	W 109–108 (OT)	Al Jefferson (39)	Kevin Love (15)	Mike Miller (7)	Target Center; 16,009	15–27
43	January 26	@ Milwaukee	W 90–83	Al Jefferson (23)	Al Jefferson, Mike Miller (10)	Randy Foye (7)	Bradley Center; 12,914	16–27
44	January 28	Detroit	L 89–98	Al Jefferson (24)	Kevin Love (10)	Randy Foye, Mike Miller (5)	Target Center; 14,232	16–28
45	January 30	L.A. Lakers	L 119–132	Al Jefferson (34)	Al Jefferson (13)	Sebastian Telfair (7)	Target Center; 19,111	16–29

February: 2–11 (home: 0–6; road: 2–5)

Game	Date	Team	Score	High points	High rebounds	High assists	Location Attendance	Record
46	February 1	@ Boston	L 101–109	Al Jefferson (34)	Al Jefferson (11)	Randy Foye (9)	TD Banknorth Garden; 18,624	16–30
47	February 3	@ Indiana	W 116–111	Randy Foye (19)	Al Jefferson (15)	Randy Foye (5)	Conseco Fieldhouse; 11,015	17–30
48	February 4	Atlanta	L 86–94	Al Jefferson (18)	Kevin Love (14)	Mike Miller (4)	Target Center; 13,745	17–31
49	February 7	@ Houston	L 90–107	Al Jefferson (36)	Al Jefferson (22)	Sebastian Telfair (9)	Toyota Center; 16,815	17–32
50	February 8	@ New Orleans	L 97–101	Al Jefferson (25)	Al Jefferson (14)	Sebastian Telfair (6)	New Orleans Arena; 16,046	17–33
51	February 10	Toronto	L 102–110	Randy Foye (33)	Kevin Love (12)	Mike Miller (5)	Target Center; 12,722	17–34
52	February 17	@ Washington	L 103–111	Randy Foye (23)	Kevin Love (11)	Mike Miller (6)	Verizon Center; 11,623	17–35
53	February 18	@ Miami	W 111–104	Sebastian Telfair (30)	Brian Cardinal (10)	Mike Miller (9)	American Airlines Arena; 17,525	18–35
54	February 20	Indiana	L 105–112	Randy Foye (36)	Kevin Love (12)	Sebastian Telfair (6)	Target Center; 13,777	18–36
55	February 22	L.A. Lakers	L 108–111	Sebastian Telfair, Ryan Gomes (20)	Kevin Love (10)	Randy Foye, Kevin Ollie (6)	Target Center; 19,177	18–37
56	February 24	@ Toronto	L 110–118	Randy Foye (25)	Mike Miller (12)	Mike Miller (9)	Air Canada Centre; 17,457	18–38
57	February 25	Utah	L 103–120	Ryan Gomes, Kevin Love (24)	Kevin Love (15)	Mike Miller, Sebastian Telfair (6)	Target Center; 13,108	18–39
58	February 27	Portland	L 82–102	Craig Smith, Mike Miller (16)	Ryan Gomes (9)	Mike Miller (4)	Target Center; 17,017	18–40

March: 3–13 (home: 3–5; road: 0–8)

Game	Date	Team	Score	High points	High rebounds	High assists	Location Attendance	Record
59	March 1	Houston	L 94–105	Randy Foye (24)	Craig Smith, Mike Miller (6)	Mike Miller (5)	Target Center; 13,716	18–41
60	March 3	Golden State	L 94–118	Randy Foye (19)	Kevin Love (14)	Mike Miller (4)	Target Center; 14,780	18–42
61	March 6	@ L.A. Lakers	L 90–110	Ryan Gomes (20)	Kevin Love (14)	Mike Miller (9)	Staples Center; 18,997	18–43
62	March 7	@ Portland	L 93–95	Ryan Gomes (28)	Mike Miller, Kevin Love, Jason Collins (7)	Sebastian Telfair (7)	Rose Garden; 20,535	18–44
63	March 9	Washington	L 99–110	Sebastian Telfair, Ryan Gomes (18)	Kevin Love (11)	Randy Foye (6)	Target Center; 13,119	18–45
64	March 11	Memphis	W 104–79	Ryan Gomes (25)	Kevin Love, Mike Miller (11)	Ryan Gomes (5)	Target Center; 12,443	19–45
65	March 13	New York	L 94–102	Ryan Gomes (28)	Mike Miller (11)	Mike Miller (7)	Target Center; 14,311	19–46
66	March 14	Charlotte	W 108–100	Kevin Love (22)	Kevin Love, Craig Smith (7)	Sebastian Telfair (9)	Target Center; 15,276	20–46
67	March 17	@ San Antonio	L 86–93	Sebastian Telfair, Kevin Love (17)	Kevin Love (19)	Sebastian Telfair (5)	AT&T Center; 18,797	20–47
68	March 18	@ New Orleans	L 93–94	Kevin Love (23)	Kevin Love (11)	Sebastian Telfair (6)	New Orleans Arena; 17,253	20–48
69	March 20	@ Houston	L 88–107	Craig Smith (19)	Kevin Love (12)	Mike Miller (7)	Toyota Center; 17,456	20–49
70	March 22	Oklahoma City	L 90–97	Craig Smith (19)	Craig Smith, Mike Miller (10)	Bobby Brown, Mike Miller (4)	Target Center; 18,561	20–50
71	March 23	@ Atlanta	L 97–109	Randy Foye (19)	Mike Miller (9)	Kevin Ollie, Sebastian Telfair (4)	Philips Arena; 13,425	20–51
72	March 25	@ Philadelphia	L 88–96	Rodney Carney (21)	Ryan Gomes, Kevin Love (9)	Randy Foye, Kevin Ollie (4)	Wachovia Center; 16,965	20–52
73	March 27	@ Cleveland	L 85–107	Kevin Love, Randy Foye (18)	Kevin Love (6)	Sebastian Telfair, Mike Miller (4)	Quicken Loans Arena; 20,562	20–53
74	March 29	New Jersey	W 108–99	Mike Miller (22)	Kevin Love (11)	Kevin Ollie (7)	Target Center; 16,539	21–53

April: 3–3 (home: 0–2; road: 3–1)

Game	Date	Team	Score	High points	High rebounds	High assists	Location Attendance	Record
76	April 3	@ Utah	W 103–102	Ryan Gomes, Rodney Carney (25)	Mike Miller (9)	Mike Miller (8)	EnergySolutions Arena; 19,911	22–54
77	April 5	Denver	L 87–110	Sebastian Telfair (18)	Shelden Williams (12)	Mike Miller (6)	Target Center; 16,839	22–55
78	April 7	@ L.A. Clippers	W 87–77	Ryan Gomes (24)	Kevin Love (15)	Sebastian Telfair, Mike Miller (6)	Staples Center; 16,757	23–55
79	April 8	@ Golden State	W 105–97	Sebastian Telfair (21)	Kevin Love (12)	Mike Miller (6)	Oracle Arena; 18,808	24–55
80	April 11	Phoenix	L 97–110	Sebastian Telfair (21)	Mike Miller (9)	Mike Miller (9)	Target Center; 18,478	24–56
81	April 13	@ Dallas	L 94–96	Craig Smith (24)	Kevin Love (11)	Sebastian Telfair (12)	American Airlines Center; 19,900	24–57
82	April 15	Sacramento	L 90–97	Craig Smith (18)	Kevin Love (10)	Sebastian Telfair (6)	Target Center; 17,333	24–58

2015–16 season schedule

== Player statistics ==
=== Regular season ===
Player	POS	GP	GS	MP	REB	AST	STL	BLK	PTS	MPG	RPG	APG	SPG	BPG	PPG
Ryan Gomes	SF	82	76	2,614	392	135	63	22	1,092	31.9	4.8	1.6	.8	.3	13.3
Kevin Love	C	81	37	2,048	734	84	35	50	899	25.3	9.1	1.0	.4	.6	11.1
Sebastian Telfair	PG	75	43	2,095	127	343	73	12	738	27.9	1.7	4.6	1.0	.2	9.8
Craig Smith	PF	74	31	1,460	284	79	31	19	746	19.7	3.8	1.1	.4	.3	10.1
Mike Miller	SF	73	47	2,356	483	326	30	31	722	32.3	6.6	4.5	.4	.4	9.9
Randy Foye	SG	70	61	2,494	214	303	72	26	1,139	35.6	3.1	4.3	1.0	.4	16.3
Rodney Carney	SG	67	6	1,199	126	26	45	29	481	17.9	1.9	.4	.7	.4	7.2
Brian Cardinal	PF	64	4	909	142	76	37	13	190	14.2	2.2	1.2	.6	.2	3.0
Al Jefferson	C	50	50	1,836	548	79	39	83	1,156	36.7	11.0	1.6	.8	1.7	23.1
Kevin Ollie	PG	50	21	850	75	117	19	4	202	17.0	1.5	2.3	.4	.1	4.0
Rashad McCants^{†}	SG	34	2	636	63	32	27	6	308	18.7	1.9	.9	.8	.2	9.1
Jason Collins	C	31	22	422	70	11	9	13	57	13.6	2.3	.4	.3	.4	1.8
Bobby Brown^{†}	PG	21	1	256	16	30	6	2	116	12.2	.8	1.4	.3	.1	5.5
Mark Madsen	C	19	1	116	18	4	1	1	6	6.1	.9	.2	.1	.1	.3
Corey Brewer	SF	15	8	307	49	25	15	3	93	20.5	3.3	1.7	1.0	.2	6.2
Shelden Williams^{†}	PF	15	0	207	75	4	10	8	74	13.8	5.0	.3	.7	.5	4.9
Calvin Booth^{†}	C	1	0	1	1	0	0	0	0	1.0	1.0	.0	.0	.0	.0

- ^{†} Denotes player spent time with another team in the season. Stats reflect time with the Timberwolves only.
