= 2008–09 Golden State Warriors season =

NBA professional basketball team season

- Head coach: Don Nelson
- General manager: Chris Mullin; Pete D'Alessandro (assistant)
- Owner: Chris Cohan
- Arena: Oracle Arena

Results
- Record: 29–53 (.354)
- Place: Division: 3rd (Pacific); Conference: 10th (Western)
- Playoff finish: Did not qualify
- Stats at Basketball Reference

The 2008–09 Golden State Warriors season was the 63rd season of the franchise in the National Basketball Association (NBA), and its 47th in the San Francisco Bay Area.

== Draft picks ==
Round	Pick	Player	Position	Nationality	School / club team
1	14	Anthony Randolph	PF	United States	Louisiana State
2	49	Richard Hendrix	PF	United States	Alabama

== Regular season ==
=== Standings ===
Pacific Division	W	L	PCT	GB	Home	Road	Div	GP
c-Los Angeles Lakers	65	17	.793	—	36–5	29–12	14–2	82
Phoenix Suns	46	36	.561	19	28–13	18–23	11–5	82
Golden State Warriors	29	53	.354	36	21–20	8–33	6–10	82
Los Angeles Clippers	19	63	.232	46	11–30	8–33	2–14	82
Sacramento Kings	17	65	.207	48	11–30	6–35	7–9	82

#	Western Conference				
#	Team	W	L	PCT	GB
1	c-Los Angeles Lakers	65	17	.793	—
2	y-Denver Nuggets	54	28	.659	11
3	y-San Antonio Spurs	54	28	.659	11
4	x-Portland Trail Blazers	54	28	.659	11
5	x-Houston Rockets	53	29	.646	12
6	x-Dallas Mavericks	50	32	.610	15
7	x-New Orleans Hornets	49	33	.598	16
8	x-Utah Jazz	48	34	.585	17
9	Phoenix Suns	46	36	.561	19
10	Golden State Warriors	29	53	.354	36
11	Memphis Grizzlies	24	58	.293	41
12	Minnesota Timberwolves	24	58	.293	41
13	Oklahoma City Thunder	23	59	.280	42
14	Los Angeles Clippers	19	63	.232	46
15	Sacramento Kings	17	65	.207	48

=== Game log ===
2008–09 game log
Total: 29–53 (Home: 21–20; Road: 8–32)
October: 0–2 (home: 0–1; road: 0–1)

Game	Date	Team	Score	High points	High rebounds	High assists	Location Attendance	Record
1	October 29	New Orleans	L 103–108	Corey Maggette (27)	Andris Biedriņš (12)	Stephen Jackson (5)	Oracle Arena; 19,128	0–1
2	October 31	@ Toronto	L 108–112 (OT)	Al Harrington (26)	Andris Biedriņš (13)	Stephen Jackson (5)	Air Canada Centre; 19,800	0–2

November: 5–10 (home: 3–3; road: 2–7)

Game	Date	Team	Score	High points	High rebounds	High assists	Location Attendance	Record
3	November 1	@ New Jersey	W 105–97	Jackson, Biedriņš (23)	Andris Biedriņš (11)	Stephen Jackson (8)	Izod Center; 17,390	1–2
4	November 3	@ Memphis	L 79–90	Stephen Jackson (17)	Andris Biedriņš (22)	Stephen Jackson (5)	FedExForum; 10,121	1–3
5	November 5	Denver	W 111–101	Stephen Jackson (29)	Brandan Wright (13)	Stephen Jackson (7)	Oracle Arena; 18,194	2–3
6	November 7	Memphis	L 104–109	Stephen Jackson (27)	Andris Biedriņš (12)	C. J. Watson (8)	Oracle Arena; 18,744	2–4
7	November 9	@ Sacramento	L 98–115	Andris Biedriņš (16)	Andris Biedriņš (18)	Stephen Jackson (6)	ARCO Arena; 12,090	2–5
8	November 11	Minnesota	W 113–110 (OT)	Stephen Jackson (30)	Andris Biedriņš (15)	Stephen Jackson (5)	Oracle Arena; 17,422	3–5
9	November 13	Detroit	L 102–107	Watson, Biedriņš (17)	Andris Biedriņš (19)	Stephen Jackson (9)	Oracle Arena; 18,477	3–6
10	November 15	@ L.A. Clippers	W 121–103	Anthony Morrow (37)	Andris Biedriņš (16)	Stephen Jackson (10)	Staples Center; 12,823	4–6
11	November 18	Portland	W 111–106	Anthony Morrow (25)	Andris Biedriņš (9)	Stephen Jackson (8)	Oracle Arena; 18,284	5–6
12	November 21	Chicago	L 110–115	Stephen Jackson (32)	Andris Biedriņš (10)	Jackson, Watson (6)	Oracle Arena; 19,596	5–7
13	November 23	@ Philadelphia	L 81–89	Kelenna Azubuike (16)	Andris Biedriņš (8)	Stephen Jackson (7)	Wachovia Center; 13,556	5–8
14	November 25	@ Washington	L 100–124	Corey Maggette (17)	Andris Biedriņš (9)	Stephen Jackson (8)	Verizon Center; 13,852	5–9
15	November 26	@ Boston	L 111–119	Corey Maggette (32)	Andris Biedriņš (9)	Jackson, Crawford (6)	TD Banknorth Garden; 18,624	5–10
16	November 28	@ Cleveland	L 97–112	C. J. Watson (17)	Randolph, Biedriņš (7)	Jamal Crawford (6)	Quicken Loans Arena; 20,562	5–11
17	November 29	@ New York	L 125–138	Corey Maggette (32)	Corey Maggette (12)	Watson, Crawford (5)	Madison Square Garden; 19,317	5–12

December: 5–12 (home: 3–3; road: 2–9)

Game	Date	Team	Score	High points	High rebounds	High assists	Location Attendance	Record
18	December 1	Miami	L 129–130 (OT)	Jamal Crawford (40)	Andris Biedriņš (15)	Stephen Jackson (11)	Oracle Arena; 18,723	5–13
19	December 5	@ Houston	L 112–131	Stephen Jackson (26)	Corey Maggette (10)	Stephen Jackson (5)	Toyota Center; 14,438	5–14
20	December 6	@ San Antonio	L 88–123	Brandan Wright (13)	Andris Biedriņš (8)	Ronny Turiaf (4)	AT&T Center; 17,740	5–15
21	December 8	@ Oklahoma City	W 112–102	Jamal Crawford (19)	Andris Biedriņš (21)	Jamal Crawford (6)	Ford Center; 17,854	6–15
22	December 10	Milwaukee	W 119–96	Stephen Jackson (21)	Andris Biedriņš (14)	Stephen Jackson (8)	Oracle Arena; 18,375	7–15
23	December 12	Houston	L 108–119	Andris Biedriņš (18)	Andris Biedriņš (12)	Stephen Jackson (5)	Oracle Arena; 19,276	7–16
24	December 13	@ Denver	L 105–123	Jamal Crawford (25)	Kurz, Biedriņš (7)	Stephen Jackson (5)	Pepsi Center; 15,322	7–17
25	December 15	Orlando	L 98–109	Andris Biedriņš (23)	Kelenna Azubuike (10)	Belinelli, Crawford (6)	Oracle Arena; 18,844	7–18
26	December 17	@ Indiana	L 120–127	Jamal Crawford (29)	Andris Biedriņš (10)	3 players tied (4)	Conseco Fieldhouse; 11,151	7–19
27	December 19	@ Atlanta	L 99–115	Marco Belinelli (27)	Andris Biedriņš (15)	Belinelli, Biedriņš (6)	Philips Arena; 16,768	7–20
28	December 20	@ Charlotte	W 110–103	Jamal Crawford (50)	Kelenna Azubuike (13)	Crawford, Turiaf (5)	Time Warner Cable Arena; 13,068	8–20
29	December 22	@ Orlando	L 81–113	Jamal Crawford (18)	Anthony Randolph (12)	Andris Biedriņš (5)	Amway Arena; 17,461	8–21
30	December 23	@ Miami	L 88–96	C. J. Watson (18)	Azubuike, Biedriņš (9)	Azubuike, Belinelli (3)	American Airlines Arena; 17,862	8–22
31	December 26	Boston	W 99–89	Stephen Jackson (28)	Ronny Turiaf (8)	Jackson, Belinelli (4)	Oracle Arena; 19,596	9–22
32	December 28	@ L.A. Lakers	L 113–130	Jamal Crawford (22)	Andris Biedriņš (17)	Crawford, Jackson (5)	Staples Center; 18,997	9–23
33	December 29	Toronto	W 117–111	Stephen Jackson (30)	Andris Biedriņš (15)	Jackson, Crawford (7)	Oracle Arena; 19,596	10–23
34	December 31	@ Oklahoma City	L 100–107	Kelenna Azubuike (24)	Andris Biedriņš (13)	Stephen Jackson (9)	Ford Center; 18,229	10–24

January: 5–9 (home: 4–4; road: 1–5)

Game	Date	Team	Score	High points	High rebounds	High assists	Location Attendance	Record
35	January 2	@ Minnesota	L 108–115	Stephen Jackson (25)	Andris Biedriņš (13)	Stephen Jackson (7)	Target Center; 11,921	10–25
36	January 5	@ Utah	L 114–119	Jamal Crawford (28)	Andris Biedriņš (17)	Jamal Crawford (6)	EnergySolutions Arena; 19,911	10–26
37	January 7	L.A. Lakers	L 106–114	Jamal Crawford (25)	Andris Biedriņš (17)	Jamal Crawford (9)	Oracle Arena; 19,596	10–27
38	January 10	@ Portland	L 100–113	Corey Maggette (25)	Biedriņš, Turiaf (6)	Ronny Turiaf (7)	Rose Garden; 20,687	10–28
39	January 11	Indiana	W 120–117	Jamal Crawford (32)	Andris Biedriņš (9)	3 players tied (5)	Oracle Arena; 18,262	11–28
40	January 14	Sacramento	L 133–135 (3OT)	Jamal Crawford (35)	Andris Biedriņš (14)	C. J. Watson (6)	Oracle Arena; 19,122	11–29
41	January 16	Atlanta	W 119–114	Jamal Crawford (29)	Corey Maggette (16)	Stephen Jackson (6)	Oracle Arena; 18,832	12–29
42	January 19	Washington	W 119–98	Jamal Crawford (28)	Andris Biedriņš (15)	Jamal Crawford (8)	Oracle Arena; 19,244	13–29
43	January 21	Oklahoma City	L 121–122	Stephen Jackson (29)	Jamal Crawford (7)	Ronny Turiaf (8)	Oracle Arena; 19,318	13–30
44	January 23	Cleveland	L 105–106	Stephen Jackson (24)	Andris Biedriņš (13)	Stephen Jackson (8)	Oracle Arena; 19,596	13–31
45	January 25	L.A. Clippers	W 107–92	Corey Maggette (20)	Andris Biedriņš (14)	Azubuike, Jackson (6)	Oracle Arena; 17,746	14–31
46	January 28	@ Dallas	L 93–117	Stephen Jackson (25)	Andris Biedriņš (11)	3 players tied (3)	American Airlines Center; 19,864	14–32
47	January 30	@ New Orleans	W 91–87	Corey Maggette (19)	Ronny Turiaf (11)	Stephen Jackson (7)	New Orleans Arena; 17,738	15–32
48	January 31	@ Houston	L 93–110	Corey Maggette (17)	Ronny Turiaf (10)	Stephen Jackson (5)	Toyota Center; 16,702	15–33

February: 5–5 (home: 5–3; road: 0–2)

Game	Date	Team	Score	High points	High rebounds	High assists	Location Attendance	Record
49	February 2	San Antonio	L 105–110 (OT)	Stephen Jackson (33)	Andris Biedriņš (9)	Stephen Jackson (11)	Oracle Arena; 18,205	15–34
50	February 4	Phoenix	W 124–112	Stephen Jackson (30)	Stephen Jackson (11)	Stephen Jackson (10)	Oracle Arena; 19,596	16–34
51	February 6	@ Phoenix	L 105–115	Corey Maggette (25)	Andris Biedriņš (11)	Jackson, Crawford (6)	US Airways Center; 18,422	16–35
52	February 8	Utah	W 116–96	Corey Maggette (24)	Stephen Jackson (10)	Stephen Jackson (8)	Oracle Arena; 19,174	17–35
53	February 10	New York	W 144–127	Stephen Jackson (35)	Kelenna Azubuike (10)	Stephen Jackson (10)	Oracle Arena; 19,098	18–35
54	February 12	Portland	W 105–98	Corey Maggette (24)	Ronny Turiaf (11)	Stephen Jackson (6)	Oracle Arena; 19,322	19–35
55	February 18	L.A. Lakers	L 121–129	Jackson, Maggette (24)	Anthony Randolph (12)	Stephen Jackson (9)	Oracle Arena; 20,007	19–36
56	February 21	Oklahoma City	W 133–120	Stephen Jackson (26)	Corey Maggette (8)	Stephen Jackson (9)	Oracle Arena; 19,108	20–36
57	February 23	@ L.A. Clippers	L 105–118	Stephen Jackson (28)	Maggette, Turiaf (7)	Marco Belinelli (5)	Staples Center; 15,383	20–37
58	February 27	Charlotte	L 109–112	Stephen Jackson (33)	Andris Biedriņš (13)	Stephen Jackson (8)	Oracle Arena; 18,653	20–38

March: 5–11 (home: 4–3; road: 1–8)

Game	Date	Team	Score	High points	High rebounds	High assists	Location Attendance	Record
59	March 1	Utah	L 104–112	Corey Maggette (27)	Andris Biedriņš (12)	C. J. Watson (5)	Oracle Arena; 18,347	20–39
60	March 3	@ Minnesota	W 118–94	Stephen Jackson (23)	Andris Biedriņš (13)	Stephen Jackson (6)	Target Center; 14,780	21–39
61	March 4	@ Chicago	L 88–110	Stephen Jackson (19)	Anthony Randolph (10)	Stephen Jackson (6)	United Center; 20,108	21–40
62	March 6	@ Detroit	L 91–108	Jamal Crawford (25)	Jermareo Davidson (10)	Jamal Crawford (8)	The Palace of Auburn Hills; 22,076	21–41
63	March 7	@ Milwaukee	L 120–127	Jamal Crawford (32)	Anthony Randolph (8)	Stephen Jackson (11)	Bradley Center; 15,569	21–42
64	March 11	New Jersey	W 116–112	Stephen Jackson (29)	Andris Biedriņš (13)	Stephen Jackson (7)	Oracle Arena; 18,203	22–42
65	March 13	Dallas	W 119–110	Stephen Jackson (31)	Ronny Turiaf (12)	Stephen Jackson (10)	Oracle Arena; 18,751	23–42
66	March 15	Phoenix	L 130–154	Monta Ellis (26)	Randolph, Turiaf (6)	Stephen Jackson (9)	Oracle Arena; 19,596	23–43
67	March 17	L.A. Clippers	W 127–120	Monta Ellis (29)	Kelenna Azubuike (9)	Ronny Turiaf (8)	Oracle Arena; 18,223	24–43
68	March 19	@ L.A. Lakers	L 106–114	Monta Ellis (27)	Brandan Wright (10)	Corey Maggette (7)	Staples Center; 18,997	24–44
69	March 20	Philadelphia	W 119–111	Brandan Wright (25)	Stephen Jackson (10)	Stephen Jackson (9)	Oracle Arena; 19,596	25–44
70	March 22	@ New Orleans	L 89–99	Stephen Jackson (22)	Stephen Jackson (10)	Stephen Jackson (5)	New Orleans Arena; 16,351	25–45
71	March 24	@ San Antonio	L 106–107	Monta Ellis (27)	Anthony Randolph (9)	Stephen Jackson (4)	AT&T Center; 18,797	25–46
72	March 25	@ Dallas	L 106–128	Anthony Morrow (29)	Anthony Randolph (6)	Ellis, Jackson (5)	American Airlines Center; 19,862	25–47
73	March 28	@ Denver	L 116–129	Jamal Crawford (30)	Anthony Randolph (14)	Jamal Crawford (5)	Pepsi Center; 19,155	25–48
74	March 30	Memphis	L 109–114	Monta Ellis (29)	Anthony Randolph (12)	Monta Ellis (5)	Oracle Arena; 18,471	25–49

April: 4–4 (home: 2–3; road: 2–1)

Game	Date	Team	Score	High points	High rebounds	High assists	Location Attendance	Record
75	April 1	Sacramento	W 143–141 (OT)	Monta Ellis (42)	Azubuike, Turiaf (13)	Monta Ellis (9)	Oracle Arena; 18,743	26–49
76	April 3	New Orleans	W 111–103	Jamal Crawford (39)	Anthony Randolph (15)	Ronny Turiaf (6)	Oracle Arena; 19,596	27–49
77	April 5	@ Sacramento	W 105–100	Kelenna Azubuike (30)	Kelenna Azubuike (15)	C. J. Watson (6)	ARCO Arena; 12,975	28–49
78	April 8	Minnesota	L 97–105	Jamal Crawford (31)	Anthony Randolph (11)	Ronny Turiaf (6)	Oracle Arena; 18,808	28–50
79	April 10	Houston	L 109–113	Kelenna Azubuike (32)	Andris Biedriņš (7)	C. J. Watson (9)	Oracle Arena; 19,596	28–51
80	April 11	@ Utah	W 118–108	C. J. Watson (38)	Andris Biedriņš (9)	C. J. Watson (9)	EnergySolutions Arena; 19,911	29–51
81	April 13	San Antonio	L 72–101	Anthony Randolph (24)	Anthony Randolph (16)	Anthony Randolph (4)	Oracle Arena; 19,596	29–52
82	April 15	@ Phoenix	L 113–117	Anthony Morrow (33)	Anthony Morrow (12)	C. J. Watson (12)	US Airways Center; 18,422	29–53

2015–16 season schedule

== Roster ==
2008–09 Golden State Warriors roster
Players

Pos.	No.	Player	Height	Weight	DOB	From
G/F	7	Kelenna Azubuike	6 ft 5 in (1.96 m)	220 lb (100 kg)	1983-12-16	Kentucky
G/F	18	Marco Belinelli	6 ft 5 in (1.96 m)	192 lb (87 kg)	1986-03-25	Italy
C	15	Andris Biedriņš	7 ft 0 in (2.13 m)	240 lb (109 kg)	1986-04-02	Latvia
G	6	Jamal Crawford	6 ft 5 in (1.96 m)	200 lb (91 kg)	1980-03-20	Michigan
F	33	Jermareo Davidson	6 ft 10 in (2.08 m)	230 lb (104 kg)	1984-11-15	Alabama
G	8	Monta Ellis (S)	6 ft 3 in (1.91 m)	175 lb (79 kg)	1985-10-26	Lanier HS (MS)
G/F	1	Stephen Jackson	6 ft 8 in (2.03 m)	218 lb (99 kg)	1978-04-05	Butler CC
F	31	Rob Kurz	6 ft 9 in (2.06 m)	232 lb (105 kg)	1985-03-05	Notre Dame
G/F	50	Corey Maggette	6 ft 6 in (1.98 m)	218 lb (99 kg)	1979-11-12	Duke
G	22	Anthony Morrow	6 ft 5 in (1.96 m)	210 lb (95 kg)	1985-09-27	Georgia Tech
F/C	4	Anthony Randolph	6 ft 10 in (2.08 m)	205 lb (93 kg)	1989-07-15	LSU
C	21	Ronny Turiaf	6 ft 10 in (2.08 m)	249 lb (113 kg)	1983-01-13	Gonzaga
G	23	C. J. Watson	6 ft 2 in (1.88 m)	180 lb (82 kg)	1984-04-17	Tennessee
F/C	32	Brandan Wright	6 ft 10 in (2.08 m)	205 lb (93 kg)	1987-10-05	North Carolina

Coaches
Head coach
- Don Nelson
Assistant(s)
- Larry Harris
- Stephen Silas
- Keith Smart
- Russell Turner

Legend
- (DP) Unsigned draft pick
- (FA) Free agent
- (S) Suspended
- (DL) On assignment to D-League affiliate
- (L) On leave from the team
- Injured

Roster
Updated: January 5, 2009

== Player statistics ==
Legend
GP	Games played	GS	Games started	MPG	Minutes per game
FG%	Field-goal percentage	3P%	3-point field-goal percentage	FT%	Free-throw percentage
RPG	Rebounds per game	APG	Assists per game	SPG	Steals per game
BPG	Blocks per game	PPG	Points per game

=== Regular season ===
Player	GP	GS	MPG	FG%	3P%	FT%	RPG	APG	SPG	BPG	PPG
Ronny Turiaf	79	26	21.5	.508	.000	.790	4.6	2.1	.4	2.1	5.9
C. J. Watson	77	18	24.5	.457	.400	.870	2.5	2.7	1.2	.1	9.5
Kelenna Azubuike	74	51	32.1	.464	.448	.808	5.0	1.6	.8	.7	14.4
Anthony Morrow	67	17	22.6	.478	.467	.870	3.0	1.2	.5	.2	10.1
Anthony Randolph	63	22	17.9	.462	.000	.716	5.8	.8	.7	1.2	7.9
Andris Biedriņš	62	58	30.0	.578	.000	.551	11.2	2.0	1.0	1.5	11.9
Stephen Jackson	59	59	39.6	.414	.338	.826	5.1	6.5	1.5	.5	20.7
Jamal Crawford^{†}	54	54	38.6	.406	.338	.889	3.3	4.4	.9	.2	19.7
Corey Maggette	51	19	31.1	.461	.253	.824	5.5	1.8	.9	.2	18.6
Marco Belinelli	42	23	21.0	.442	.397	.769	1.7	2.1	.9	.0	8.9
Rob Kurz	40	5	11.1	.389	.395	.800	2.0	.5	.4	.5	3.9
Brandan Wright	39	23	17.6	.528	.000	.741	4.0	.5	.6	.9	8.3
Monta Ellis	25	25	35.7	.451	.308	.830	4.3	3.7	1.6	.3	19.0
Jermareo Davidson	14	0	7.9	.486		.471	2.4	.1	.1	.2	3.0
DeMarcus Nelson	13	5	13.2	.444	.000	.357	1.8	1.0	.7	.2	4.1
Marcus Williams	9	0	6.0	.235	.333	.333	.4	1.4	.1	.1	1.3
Al Harrington^{†}	5	5	33.2	.329	.393	.500	5.6	2.0	1.4	.0	12.4

- ^{†} Denotes player spent time with another team in the season. Stats reflect time with the Warriors only.

== Transactions ==
=== Trades ===
July 22, 2008	To Golden State Warriors Marcus Williams	To New Jersey Nets Future first-round pick
November 21, 2008	To Golden State Warriors Jamal Crawford	To New York Knicks Al Harrington

=== Free agency ===
==== Re-signed ====
Player	Signed
Monta Ellis	6-year contract worth $67 million
Kelenna Azubuike	3-year contract worth $9 million
Andris Biedriņš	6-year contract worth $54 million

==== Additions ====
Player	Signed	Former team
Corey Maggette	5-year contract worth $50 million	Los Angeles Clippers
Ronny Turiaf	4-year contract worth $17 million	Los Angeles Lakers
Anthony Morrow	2-year contract worth $1.7 million	Georgia Tech
Rob Kurz	1-year contract	Notre Dame
DeMarcus Nelson	1-year contract	Duke
Jermareo Davidson	for remainder of the season	Idaho Stampede

==== Subtractions ====
Player	Reason left	New team
Baron Davis	5-year contract worth $65 million	Los Angeles Clippers
Mickaël Piétrus	4-year contract worth $21 million	Orlando Magic
Patrick O'Bryant	2-year contract worth $3 million	Boston Celtics
Matt Barnes	1-year contract worth $926,678	Phoenix Suns
DeMarcus Nelson	Waived	KK Zagreb
Marcus Williams	Waived	Memphis Grizzlies
