= 2008–09 New Orleans Hornets season =

- Head coach: Byron Scott
- General manager: Jeff Bower
- Owner: George Shinn
- Arena: New Orleans Arena

Results
- Record: 49–33 (.598)
- Place: Division: 4th (Southwest); Conference: 7th (Western)
- Playoff finish: First Round (lost to Nuggets 1–4)
- Stats at Basketball Reference

Local media
- Television: Cox Sports Television
- Radio: KMEZ

The 2008–09 New Orleans Hornets season was the seventh (Note: At the time, this season was considered the 21st season in franchise history, being viewed as a relocation from Charlotte. In 2014, after this team was rebranded as the Pelicans, the name and the statistical history of the original team was reclaimed by the present day Charlotte Hornets, who had begun play in 2004 as an expansion team known as the Charlotte Bobcats.) season of the franchise in the National Basketball Association.

The regular season was marred by injuries, with only Rasual Butler playing in all games. The remaining four starters missed a combined 68 games, of whom center Tyson Chandler missed 37 games. Even when not on the injured list, Chandler's season was sub-par. Perhaps partly as a result of this, on February 18 Chandler was traded to the Oklahoma City Thunder for forwards Joe Smith and Chris Wilcox. Despite the less than stellar season, this was generally perceived as a payroll-shedding move. However, within a day, the trade was rescinded due to concerns regarding Chandlers turf toe, which according to Chandler and the Hornet organization was not the reason for his stints on the injury list.

Battling these issues for much of the season, the Hornets finished the season with a record of 49–33, 7 games off the franchise best record of the previous season. This meant that the Hornets only finished 4th in the Southwest Division and 7th in the Western Conference. In the 2009 NBA Playoffs, the Hornets lost 1–4 in the first round to the second seeded Denver Nuggets. All four losses were severe, with the worst being a 58–point drubbing at home in Game 4, losing 63–121, which tied for the most lopsided loss in NBA Playoff history. Naturally lamented by fans and media alike, the embarrassing performance can at least be partly explained by the health situation of the players, with arguably the top 5 Hornets ailing to varying injuries.

== Key dates ==
- June 26: The 2008 NBA draft will take place in New York City.
- July 1: The free agency period will start.

== Offseason ==
On July 9, the Hornets announced they had signed their All Star point guard Chris Paul to a contract extension. Hornets owner George Shinn saying ''Chris is the face of our franchise and a leader both on and off the court...Getting him signed to an extension was our number one priority...'' On July 23 it was announced the Hornets had acquired free agent forward James Posey, a member of the 2008 Boston Celtics team that won the championship.

== Draft picks ==
Round	Pick	Player	Position	Nationality	College
1	27	Darrell Arthur (traded to Memphis via Portland)	(PF)	United States	Kansas

The Hornets entered the draft with one first-round pick. They had traded their second-round pick to the Houston Rockets in 2006, before eventually landing with the Seattle SuperSonics during the draft.

== Trades ==
December 10, 2008: The New Orleans Hornets traded Mike James to the Washington Wizards for Antonio Daniels.

February 17, 2009: The Hornets traded Tyson Chandler to the Oklahoma City Thunder for Joe Smith, Chris Wilcox and rights to DeVon Hardin. The trade was nullified when Chandler failed his physical because of a previous turf toe injury.

== All Stars ==
For the second year in a row the Hornets were represented with two players at the NBA All Star Game as Chris Paul was voted in by the fans as a starter, and David West was selected as a reserve by the NBA coaches.

== Roster ==
2008–09 New Orleans Hornets roster
Players

Pos.	No.	Player	Height	Weight	DOB	From
C	12	Hilton Armstrong	6 ft 11 in (2.11 m)	235 lb (107 kg)	1984-11-11	Connecticut
SF	40	Ryan Bowen	6 ft 7 in (2.01 m)	215 lb (98 kg)	1975-11-20	Iowa
SG	23	Devin Brown	6 ft 5 in (1.96 m)	220 lb (100 kg)	1978-12-30	Texas–San Antonio
SF	45	Rasual Butler	6 ft 7 in (2.01 m)	215 lb (98 kg)	1979-05-23	La Salle
C	6	Tyson Chandler	7 ft 1 in (2.16 m)	240 lb (109 kg)	1982-10-02	Dominguez HS (CA)
PG	50	Antonio Daniels	6 ft 4 in (1.93 m)	195 lb (88 kg)	1975-03-19	Bowling Green
C	33	Melvin Ely	6 ft 10 in (2.08 m)	260 lb (118 kg)	1978-05-02	Fresno State
C	4	Sean Marks	6 ft 10 in (2.08 m)	250 lb (113 kg)	1975-08-23	California
PG	3	Chris Paul	6 ft 0 in (1.83 m)	175 lb (79 kg)	1985-05-06	Wake Forest
SG	9	Morris Peterson	6 ft 7 in (2.01 m)	220 lb (100 kg)	1977-08-26	Michigan State
SG	41	James Posey	6 ft 8 in (2.03 m)	217 lb (98 kg)	1977-01-13	Xavier
SF	16	Peja Stojaković	6 ft 10 in (2.08 m)	229 lb (104 kg)	1977-06-09	Serbia
PF	30	David West	6 ft 9 in (2.06 m)	240 lb (109 kg)	1980-08-29	Xavier
SF	32	Julian Wright	6 ft 8 in (2.03 m)	225 lb (102 kg)	1987-05-20	Kansas

Coaches
Head coach
- Byron Scott
Assistant(s)
- Kenny Gattison
- Charlie Parker
- Paul Pressey
- Terry Kofler (trainer)

Legend
- (DP) Unsigned draft pick
- (FA) Free agent
- (S) Suspended
- (DL) On assignment to D-League affiliate
- Injured

Roster
Updated: December 10, 2008

== Regular season ==
=== Standings ===
Southwest Division	W	L	PCT	GB	Home	Road	Div
y-San Antonio Spurs	54	28	.659	—	28–13	26–15	10–6
x-Houston Rockets	53	29	.646	1	33–8	20–21	9–7
x-Dallas Mavericks	50	32	.610	4	32–9	18–23	7–9
x-New Orleans Hornets	49	33	.598	5	28–13	21–20	9–7
Memphis Grizzlies	24	58	.284	30	16–25	8–33	5–11

#	Western Conference				
#	Team	W	L	PCT	GB
1	c-Los Angeles Lakers	65	17	.793	—
2	y-Denver Nuggets	54	28	.659	11
3	y-San Antonio Spurs	54	28	.659	11
4	x-Portland Trail Blazers	54	28	.659	11
5	x-Houston Rockets	53	29	.646	12
6	x-Dallas Mavericks	50	32	.610	15
7	x-New Orleans Hornets	49	33	.598	16
8	x-Utah Jazz	48	34	.585	17
9	Phoenix Suns	46	36	.561	19
10	Golden State Warriors	29	53	.354	36
11	Memphis Grizzlies	24	58	.293	41
12	Minnesota Timberwolves	24	58	.293	41
13	Oklahoma City Thunder	23	59	.280	42
14	Los Angeles Clippers	19	63	.232	46
15	Sacramento Kings	17	65	.207	48

=== Game log ===
2008–09 game log
October: 2–0 (home: 0–0; road: 2–0)

Game	Date	Team	Score	High points	High rebounds	High assists	Location Attendance	Record
1	October 29	@ Golden State	W 108–103	David West (24)	Tyson Chandler (16)	Chris Paul (11)	Oracle Arena; 19,128	1–0
2	October 30	@ Phoenix	W 108–95	Morris Peterson (21)	Chris Paul (8)	Chris Paul (10)	US Airways Center; 18,422	2–0

November: 7–6 (home: 4–3; road: 3–3)

Game	Date	Team	Score	High points	High rebounds	High assists	Location Attendance	Record
3	November 1	Cleveland	W 104–92	David West (25)	James Posey (6)	Chris Paul (15)	New Orleans Arena; 18,150	3–0
4	November 5	Atlanta	L 79–87	Chris Paul (22)	David West, Tyson Chandler (7)	Chris Paul (11)	New Orleans Arena; 16,030	3–1
5	November 7	@ Charlotte	L 89–92	Predrag Stojaković, Chris Paul (20)	Predrag Stojaković, Tyson Chandler (7)	Chris Paul (10)	Time Warner Cable Arena; 13,435	3–2
6	November 8	Miami	W 100–89	David West, Chris Paul (21)	Tyson Chandler (10)	Chris Paul (13)	New Orleans Arena; 17,701	4–2
7	November 12	L.A. Lakers	L 86–93	Chris Paul (30)	David West (12)	Chris Paul (13)	New Orleans Arena; 18,239	4–3
8	November 14	Portland	W 87–82	David West (18)	Tyson Chandler (7)	Chris Paul (9)	New Orleans Arena; 16,071	5–3
9	November 15	@ Houston	L 82–91	David West (18)	David West (10)	Chris Paul (12)	Toyota Center; 18,303	5–4
10	November 19	Sacramento	L 96–105	David West (22)	Tyson Chandler (10)	Chris Paul (15)	New Orleans Arena; 15,533	5–5
11	November 21	@ Oklahoma City	W 105–80	David West (19)	David West (8)	Chris Paul (6)	Ford Center; 19,136	6–5
12	November 22	Oklahoma City	W 109–97	David West (33)	Chris Paul (10)	Chris Paul (16)	New Orleans Arena; 16,023	7–5
13	November 24	@ L.A. Clippers	W 99–87	David West (27)	Chris Paul (10)	Chris Paul (17)	Staples Center; 14,956	8–5
14	November 27	@ Denver	W 105–101	Chris Paul (22)	David West (8)	Chris Paul (10)	Pepsi Center; 15,563	9–5
15	November 28	@ Portland	L 86–101	Predrag Stojaković (21)	Chris Paul, Tyson Chandler (6)	Chris Paul (6)	Rose Garden; 20,638	9–6

December: 10–3 (home: 7–1; road: 3–2)

Game	Date	Team	Score	High points	High rebounds	High assists	Location Attendance	Record
16	December 3	Phoenix	W 104–91	Predrag Stojaković, Chris Paul (24)	David West (14)	Chris Paul (15)	New Orleans Arena; 15,804	10–6
17	December 6	Memphis	W 106–87	Chris Paul (21)	James Posey (7)	Chris Paul (11)	New Orleans Arena; 16,822	11–6
18	December 10	Charlotte	W 105–89	David West, Predrag Stojaković (17)	Tyson Chandler (11)	Chris Paul (15)	New Orleans Arena; 15,750	12–6
19	December 12	@ Boston	L 82–94	David West (23)	David West (14)	Chris Paul (14)	TD Banknorth Garden; 18,624	12–7
20	December 14	@ Toronto	W 99–91	David West (29)	James Posey (10)	Chris Paul (12)	Air Canada Centre; 18,537	13–7
21	December 16	@ Memphis	W 91–84	David West, Chris Paul (18)	Tyson Chandler (6)	Chris Paul (9)	FedExForum; 10,231	14–7
22	December 17	San Antonio	W 90–83	David West (21)	Tyson Chandler (11)	Chris Paul (12)	New Orleans Arena; 16,593	15–7
23	December 20	Sacramento	W 99–90	Chris Paul (34)	Tyson Chandler (8)	Chris Paul (9)	New Orleans Arena; 16,869	16–7
24	December 23	L.A. Lakers	L 87–100	Rasual Butler, Chris Paul (17)	Tyson Chandler (10)	Chris Paul (10)	New Orleans Arena; 18,405	16–8
25	December 25	@ Orlando	L 68–88	David West (13)	David West (7)	Chris Paul (4)	Amway Arena; 17,461	16–9
26	December 26	Houston	W 88–79	Chris Paul (26)	Tyson Chandler (12)	Chris Paul (10)	New Orleans Arena; 18,326	17–9
27	December 28	@ Indiana	W 105–103	James Posey, Chris Paul (19)	David West (10)	Chris Paul (12)	Conseco Fieldhouse; 14,374	18–9
28	December 30	Washington	W 97–85	Rasual Butler (21)	Tyson Chandler (11)	Chris Paul (16)	New Orleans Arena; 18,021	19–9

January: 9–7 (home: 5–2; road: 4–5)

Game	Date	Team	Score	High points	High rebounds	High assists	Location Attendance	Record
29	January 2	@ Portland	W 92–77	David West (25)	James Posey (9)	Chris Paul (11)	Rose Garden; 20,708	20–9
30	January 3	@ Denver	L 100–105	Chris Paul (30)	David West (8)	Chris Paul (11)	Pepsi Center; 19,614	20–10
31	January 6	@ L.A. Lakers	W 116–105	David West (40)	David West (11)	Chris Paul (15)	Staples Center; 18,997	21–10
32	January 7	@ Utah	L 90–116	Chris Paul (26)	David West (6)	Chris Paul (7)	EnergySolutions Arena; 19,911	21–11
33	January 9	L.A. Clippers	W 107–80	Rasual Butler (27)	Tyson Chandler (11)	Chris Paul (7)	New Orleans Arena; 17,815	22–11
34	January 12	New York	L 95–101	David West (25)	David West (14)	Chris Paul (7)	New Orleans Arena; 16,177	22–12
35	January 14	@ Dallas	W 104–97	Chris Paul (33)	Tyson Chandler (14)	Chris Paul (11)	American Airlines Center; 19,947	23–12
36	January 16	@ Cleveland	L 78–92	David West (23)	Tyson Chandler (9)	Chris Paul (6)	Quicken Loans Arena; 20,562	23–13
37	January 17	@ Detroit	W 91–85	Chris Paul (23)	Tyson Chandler (11)	Chris Paul (14)	The Palace of Auburn Hills; 22,076	24–13
38	January 19	Indiana	W 103–100	Chris Paul (27)	Melvin Ely (6)	Chris Paul (9)	New Orleans Arena; 17,237	25–13
39	January 21	New Jersey	W 102–92	Chris Paul (29)	Predrag Stojaković (10)	Chris Paul (8)	New Orleans Arena; 14,748	26–13
40	January 23	@ Minnesota	L 108–116	James Posey (24)	Sean Marks (7)	Chris Paul (12)	Target Center; 18,224	26–14
41	January 26	Philadelphia	W 101–86	Chris Paul (27)	Chris Paul (10)	Chris Paul (15)	New Orleans Arena; 16,131	27–14
42	January 28	Denver	W 94–81	Predrag Stojaković (26)	James Posey (9)	Chris Paul (10)	New Orleans Arena; 15,792	28–14
43	January 30	Golden State	L 87–91	Chris Paul (31)	David West (15)	Chris Paul (8)	New Orleans Arena; 17,738	28–15
44	January 31	@ San Antonio	L 93–106	Chris Paul (38)	David West (10)	Chris Paul (4)	AT&T Center; 18,797	28–16

February: 7–6 (home: 5–3; road: 2–3)

Game	Date	Team	Score	High points	High rebounds	High assists	Location Attendance	Record
45	February 2	Portland	L 89–97	David West (25)	David West (8)	Chris Paul (13)	New Orleans Arena; 14,781	28–17
46	February 4	Chicago	L 93–107	Predrag Stojaković, David West (24)	David West (14)	Devin Brown (7)	New Orleans Arena; 16,270	28–18
47	February 6	Toronto	W 101–92	Predrag Stojaković (28)	David West (10)	David West, Antonio Daniels (6)	New Orleans Arena; 17,319	29–18
48	February 8	Minnesota	W 101–97	Rasual Butler (23)	Rasual Butler (8)	Antonio Daniels (7)	New Orleans Arena; 16,046	30–18
49	February 9	@ Memphis	L 80–85	Predrag Stojaković (23)	Devin Brown (9)	Antonio Daniels (4)	FedExForum; 10,896	30–19
50	February 11	Boston	L 77–89	David West (15)	David West (8)	Antonio Daniels, Chris Paul (5)	New Orleans Arena; 18,080	30–20
51	February 17	@ Oklahoma City	W 100–98	David West (37)	David West (13)	Chris Paul (8)	Ford Center; 18,593	31–20
52	February 18	Orlando	W 117–85	Chris Paul (36)	Melvin Ely, Rasual Butler (8)	Chris Paul (10)	New Orleans Arena; 16,651	32–20
53	February 20	@ L.A. Lakers	L 111–115 (OT)	Rasual Butler (31)	David West (16)	Chris Paul (16)	Staples Center; 18,997	32–21
54	February 21	@ Utah	L 88–102	Chris Paul (24)	Predrag Stojaković (11)	Chris Paul (7)	EnergySolutions Arena; 19,911	32–22
55	February 23	@ Sacramento	W 112–105	Chris Paul (27)	Tyson Chandler (10)	Chris Paul (13)	ARCO Arena; 11,633	33–22
56	February 25	Detroit	W 90–87	David West (30)	Tyson Chandler (17)	Chris Paul (13)	New Orleans Arena; 17,215	34–22
57	February 27	Milwaukee	W 95–94	David West (28)	David West (12)	Chris Paul (20)	New Orleans Arena; 17,621	35–22

March: 11–5 (home: 6–2; road: 5–3)

Game	Date	Team	Score	High points	High rebounds	High assists	Location Attendance	Record
58	March 1	@ New Jersey	W 99–96	David West (32)	Tyson Chandler (12)	Chris Paul (9)	Izod Center; 15,509	36–22
59	March 2	@ Philadelphia	W 98–91	David West (30)	James Posey (12)	Chris Paul (12)	Wachovia Center; 14,299	37–22
60	March 5	Dallas	W 104–88	Chris Paul (27)	Tyson Chandler (11)	Chris Paul (15)	New Orleans Arena; 17,230	38–22
61	March 7	Oklahoma City	W 108–90	Chris Paul (21)	David West (12)	Chris Paul (14)	New Orleans Arena; 18,114	39–22
62	March 9	@ Atlanta	L 79–89	Chris Paul (24)	David West (20)	Chris Paul (10)	Philips Arena; 14,204	39–23
63	March 11	@ Washington	W 109–98	Chris Paul (30)	Chris Paul, Tyson Chandler (10)	Chris Paul (13)	Verizon Center; 15,255	40–23
64	March 13	@ Milwaukee	W 95–86	Chris Paul (30)	Tyson Chandler (17)	Chris Paul (9)	Bradley Center; 15,701	41–23
65	March 14	@ Chicago	L 79–97	Chris Paul (29)	Tyson Chandler (9)	Chris Paul (6)	United Center; 22,135	41–24
66	March 16	Houston	L 84–95	Chris Paul (29)	David West (13)	Chris Paul (11)	New Orleans Arena; 17,723	41–25
67	March 18	Minnesota	W 94–93	Chris Paul (26)	David West, Hilton Armstrong (8)	Chris Paul (10)	New Orleans Arena; 17,253	42–25
68	March 20	Memphis	W 96–84	Chris Paul (32)	James Posey (8)	Chris Paul (9)	New Orleans Arena; 17,837	43–25
69	March 22	Golden State	W 99–89	Chris Paul (27)	Hilton Armstrong (11)	Chris Paul (8)	New Orleans Arena; 16,351	44–25
70	March 25	Denver	L 88–101	Chris Paul (19)	David West (8)	Chris Paul (13)	New Orleans Arena; 17,274	44–26
71	March 27	@ New York	L 93–103	David West (29)	Julian Wright (14)	Chris Paul (10)	Madison Square Garden; 19,763	44–27
72	March 29	San Antonio	W 90–86	Chris Paul (26)	David West (16)	Chris Paul (9)	New Orleans Arena; 18,204	45–27
73	March 31	@ Sacramento	W 111–110	David West (40)	David West (9)	Chris Paul (15)	ARCO Arena; 17,317	46–27

April: 3–6 (home: 1–2; road: 2–4)

Game	Date	Team	Score	High points	High rebounds	High assists	Location Attendance	Record
74	April 1	@ L.A. Clippers	W 104–98	Chris Paul (30)	Julian Wright (9)	Chris Paul (14)	Staples Center; 19,060	47–27
75	April 3	@ Golden State	L 103–111	Chris Paul (43)	David West (14)	Chris Paul (9)	Oracle Arena; 19,596	47–28
76	April 5	Utah	L 94–108	David West (23)	David West (12)	Chris Paul (12)	New Orleans Arena; 17,362	47–29
77	April 7	@ Miami	W 93–87 (OT)	Chris Paul (26)	Chris Paul (9)	Chris Paul (9)	American Airlines Arena; 19,600	48–29
78	April 8	Phoenix	L 100–105	Chris Paul (29)	David West (12)	Chris Paul (16)	New Orleans Arena; 17,781	48–30
79	April 10	@ Dallas	L 92–100	Chris Paul (42)	David West (14)	Chris Paul (7)	American Airlines Center; 20,370	48–31
80	April 12	Dallas	W 102–92	David West, Chris Paul (31)	Chris Paul (9)	Chris Paul (17)	New Orleans Arena; 16,640	49–31
81	April 13	@ Houston	L 66–86	David West (14)	David West (10)	Chris Paul (7)	Toyota Center; 18,409	49–32
82	April 15	@ San Antonio	L 98–105 (OT)	David West (34)	Paul, West (7)	Chris Paul (14)	AT&T Center; 18,797	49–33

2015–16 season schedule

== Playoffs ==
2009 playoff game log
First Round: 1–4 (home: 1–1; road: 0–3)

Game	Date	Team	Score	High points	High rebounds	High assists	Location Attendance	Series
1	April 19	@ Denver	L 84–113	Chris Paul (21)	David West (6)	Chris Paul (11)	Pepsi Center; 19,536	0–1
2	April 22	@ Denver	L 93–108	David West (21)	Tyson Chandler (11)	Chris Paul (13)	Pepsi Center; 19,623	0–2
3	April 25	Denver	W 95–93	Chris Paul (32)	West, Posey (9)	Chris Paul (12)	New Orleans Arena; 17,489	1–2
4	April 27	Denver	L 63–121	David West (14)	James Posey (7)	Chris Paul (6)	New Orleans Arena; 17,236	1–3
5	April 29	@ Denver	L 86–107	David West (24)	David West (9)	Chris Paul (10)	Pepsi Center; 19,744	1–4

2009 schedule

== Player statistics ==
Legend
GP	Games played	GS	Games started	MPG	Minutes per game
FG%	Field-goal percentage	3P%	3-point field-goal percentage	FT%	Free-throw percentage
RPG	Rebounds per game	APG	Assists per game	SPG	Steals per game
BPG	Blocks per game	PPG	Points per game	Source:

=== Regular season ===
Player	GP	GS	MPG	FG%	3P%	FT%	RPG	APG	SPG	BPG	PPG
Hilton Armstrong	50	16	15.3	.520	.000	.672	2.7	0.4	0.4	0.7	4.6
Ryan Bowen	12	3	12.1	.625	.000	.333	1.3	0.5	0.8	0.3	2.6
Devin Brown	47	5	14.9	.367	.280	.840	2.1	1.0	0.6	0.1	5.9
Rasual Butler	59	50	29.2	.453	.426	.766	3.3	0.8	0.6	0.7	10.8
Tyson Chandler	37	36	31.7	.571	.000	.574	8.7	0.6	0.4	1.3	9.1
Antonio Daniels	38	4	13.6	.409	.341	.808	1.1	2.8	0.5	0.0	4.4
Melvin Ely	23	2	11.7	.384	.000	.656	2.0	0.6	0.1	0.4	3.3
Sean Marks	40	5	13.5	.443	.222	.625	3.1	0.3	0.1	0.6	3.1
Chris Paul	55	55	37.7	.493	.394	.849	5.3	11.0	2.7	0.2	21.3
Morris Peterson	28	9	12.9	.430	.417	.786	2.1	0.5	0.4	0.1	5.4
James Posey	59	0	28.7	.429	.394	.820	4.9	1.1	0.8	0.3	9.4
Peja Stojaković	53	53	34.1	.405	.382	.910	4.4	1.3	0.8	0.1	13.8
David West	53	53	38.5	.468	.250	.888	8.0	2.3	0.7	1.0	20.5
Julian Wright	33	2	9.2	.467	.143	.400	1.7	0.6	0.4	0.2	2.7

=== Playoffs ===
Player	GP	GS	MPG	FG%	3P%	FT%	RPG	APG	SPG	BPG	PPG
Chris Paul	5	5	40.2	.411	.313	.857	4.4	10.4	1.6	.0	16.6
David West	5	5	35.6	.400		.897	7.4	1.2	1.0	.4	18.0
Peja Stojaković	5	5	32.4	.367	.308	.923	2.8	.4	.8	.2	11.2
Rasual Butler	5	5	31.6	.459	.526	1.000	3.0	.2	.2	.8	10.6
James Posey	5	0	24.6	.375	.263	.846	6.2	.6	.6	.0	11.4
Sean Marks	5	0	16.0	.462	.000	.800	4.0	.0	.6	.4	3.2
Antonio Daniels	5	0	12.8	.154	.250	.818	.6	1.8	.4	.2	2.8
Tyson Chandler	4	4	23.5	.500		.500	5.3	.5	.5	.3	3.8
Hilton Armstrong	4	1	13.3	.462		.300	2.0	.3	1.0	.3	3.8
Julian Wright	4	0	8.0	.429		.500	1.5	.5	.0	.3	2.0
Devin Brown	3	0	11.0	.375	.000	1.000	1.7	.0	.0	.0	2.7
Morris Peterson	2	0	10.5	.200	.333	.750	1.5	.5	.5	.0	3.0
Ryan Bowen	1	0	2.0	.000			.0	.0	.0	.0	.0

== Awards and records ==
=== Awards ===
- Chris Paul, All-NBA Second Team

== Transactions ==
=== Free agents ===
==== Additions ====
Player	Signed	Former team
James Posey	July 16	Boston Celtics

==== Subtractions ====
Player	Left	New team
Jannero Pargo	August 15	Dynamo Moscow of the Russian League

== See also ==
- 2008–09 NBA season
