= 2008–09 San Antonio Spurs season =

- Division champions
- Head coach: Gregg Popovich
- General manager: R.C. Buford
- Arena: AT&T Center

Results
- Record: 54–28 (.659)
- Place: Division: 1st (Southwest); Conference: 3rd (Western)
- Playoff finish: First Round (lost to Mavericks 1–4)
- Stats at Basketball Reference

Local media
- Television: Fox Sports Southwest, KENS, KMYS
- Radio: WOAI

The 2008–09 San Antonio Spurs season was the 42nd season of the franchise and the 33rd in the National Basketball Association (NBA).

In the playoffs, the Spurs lost to the Dallas Mavericks in five games in the First Round.

== Key dates ==
- June 26: The 2008 NBA draft took place in New York City.
- July 1: The free agency period started.

== Draft picks ==
Round	Pick	Player	Position	Nationality	College
1	26	George Hill	Point guard	United States	IUPUI
2	45	Goran Dragić	Point guard	Slovenia	Union Olimpija
2	57	James Gist	Power forward	United States	Maryland

== Roster ==
San Antonio Spurs roster
Players

Pos.	No.	Player	Height	Weight	DOB	From
PF	15	Matt Bonner	6 ft 10 in (2.08 m)	235 lb (107 kg)		Florida
SG	12	Bruce Bowen	6 ft 7 in (2.01 m)	200 lb (91 kg)		Cal State Fullerton
PF/C	21	Tim Duncan	6 ft 11 in (2.11 m)	255 lb (116 kg)		Wake Forest
SF	4	Michael Finley	6 ft 7 in (2.01 m)	225 lb (102 kg)		Wisconsin
SG	20	Manu Ginóbili	6 ft 6 in (1.98 m)	200 lb (91 kg)		Argentina
PF/C	90	Drew Gooden	6 ft 10 in (2.08 m)	250 lb (113 kg)		Kansas
PG	3	George Hill	6 ft 2 in (1.88 m)	190 lb (86 kg)		IUPUI
C	28	Ian Mahinmi	6 ft 11 in (2.11 m)	250 lb (113 kg)		France
SG	8	Roger Mason	6 ft 5 in (1.96 m)	210 lb (95 kg)		Virginia
C	7	Fabricio Oberto	6 ft 10 in (2.08 m)	250 lb (113 kg)		Argentina
PG	9	Tony Parker	6 ft 2 in (1.88 m)	185 lb (84 kg)		France
PF	40	Kurt Thomas	6 ft 9 in (2.06 m)	240 lb (109 kg)		TCU
SF	5	Ime Udoka	6 ft 6 in (1.98 m)	215 lb (98 kg)		Portland State
PG	11	Jacque Vaughn	6 ft 1 in (1.85 m)	190 lb (86 kg)		Kansas

Coaches
Head coach
- Gregg Popovich (Air Force)
Assistant(s)
- Brett Brown (Boston University)
- Mike Budenholzer (Pomona)
- Chip Engelland (Duke)
- Chad Forcier (Seattle Pacific)
- Don Newman (Idaho)

Legend
- (DP) Unsigned draft pick
- (FA) Free agent
- (S) Suspended
- Injured

== Regular season ==
=== Standings ===
Southwest Division	W	L	PCT	GB	Home	Road	Div
y-San Antonio Spurs	54	28	.659	—	28–13	26–15	10–6
x-Houston Rockets	53	29	.646	1	33–8	20–21	9–7
x-Dallas Mavericks	50	32	.610	4	32–9	18–23	7–9
x-New Orleans Hornets	49	33	.598	5	28–13	21–20	9–7
Memphis Grizzlies	24	58	.284	30	16–25	8–33	5–11

#	Western Conference				
#	Team	W	L	PCT	GB
1	c-Los Angeles Lakers	65	17	.793	—
2	y-Denver Nuggets	54	28	.659	11
3	y-San Antonio Spurs	54	28	.659	11
4	x-Portland Trail Blazers	54	28	.659	11
5	x-Houston Rockets	53	29	.646	12
6	x-Dallas Mavericks	50	32	.610	15
7	x-New Orleans Hornets	49	33	.598	16
8	x-Utah Jazz	48	34	.585	17
9	Phoenix Suns	46	36	.561	19
10	Golden State Warriors	29	53	.354	36
11	Memphis Grizzlies	24	58	.293	41
12	Minnesota Timberwolves	24	58	.293	41
13	Oklahoma City Thunder	23	59	.280	42
14	Los Angeles Clippers	19	63	.232	46
15	Sacramento Kings	17	65	.207	48

=== Game log ===
2008–09 game log
Total: 54–28 (home: 28–13; road: 26–15)
October: 0–2 (home: 0–1; road: 0–1)

Game	Date	Team	Score	High points	High rebounds	High assists	Location Attendance	Record
1	October 29	Phoenix	L 98–103	Tony Parker, Tim Duncan (32)	Matt Bonner, Kurt Thomas (7)	Tony Parker (5)	AT&T Center; 18,797	0–1
2	October 31	@ Portland	L 99–100	Tim Duncan (27)	Tim Duncan (10)	Tony Parker (11)	Rose Garden; 20,516	0–2

November: 9–5 (home: 5–3; road: 4–2)

Game	Date	Team	Score	High points	High rebounds	High assists	Location Attendance	Record
3	November 4	Dallas	L 81–98	Tony Parker (22)	Tim Duncan (15)	Tony Parker (3)	AT&T Center; 17,398	0–3
4	November 5	@ Minnesota	W 129–125 (2OT)	Tony Parker (55)	Tim Duncan (16)	Tony Parker (10)	Target Center; 11,112	1–3
5	November 7	Miami	L 83–99	Tim Duncan (22)	Tim Duncan (11)	Roger Mason (6)	AT&T Center; 17,387	1–4
6	November 11	New York	W 92–80	Tim Duncan (23)	Tim Duncan, Fabricio Oberto (9)	Tim Duncan (7)	AT&T Center; 16,569	2–4
7	November 12	@ Milwaukee	L 78–82	Tim Duncan (24)	Anthony Tolliver (6)	Jacque Vaughn (6)	Bradley Center; 14,036	2–5
8	November 14	Houston	W 77–75	Tim Duncan (22)	Roger Mason (9)	George Hill (5)	AT&T Center; 18,797	3–5
9	November 16	@ Sacramento	W 90–88	Michael Finley (21)	Tim Duncan (10)	Jacque Vaughn (6)	ARCO Arena; 11,699	4–5
10	November 17	@ L.A. Clippers	W 86–83	Roger Mason (21)	Tim Duncan (15)	George Hill (8)	Staples Center; 14,962	5–5
11	November 19	Denver	L 81–91	George Hill (20)	Tim Duncan (11)	Tim Duncan (6)	AT&T Center; 16,559	5–6
12	November 21	Utah	W 119–94	Roger Mason (29)	Tim Duncan (7)	George Hill, Tim Duncan, Bruce Bowen (4)	AT&T Center; 17,354	6–6
13	November 24	@ Memphis	W 94–81	George Hill (20)	Tim Duncan (11)	George Hill, Roger Mason, Michael Finley, Fabricio Oberto (3)	FedExForum; 12,053	7–6
14	November 26	Chicago	W 98–88	Tim Duncan (21)	George Hill (11)	George Hill, Manu Ginóbili (4)	AT&T Center; 17,837	8–6
15	November 28	Memphis	W 109–98	Roger Mason (20)	Tim Duncan (12)	Tony Parker, George Hill (7)	AT&T Center; 17,074	9–6
16	November 29	@ Houston	L 84–103	Tim Duncan, Matt Bonner (17)	Tim Duncan (9)	Tony Parker (7)	Toyota Center; 18,282	9–7

December: 11–4 (home: 7–2; road: 4–2)

Game	Date	Team	Score	High points	High rebounds	High assists	Location Attendance	Record
17	December 2	Detroit	L 77–89	Tim Duncan (23)	Tim Duncan (13)	Tony Parker (5)	AT&T Center; 17,582	9–8
18	December 4	@ Denver	W 108–91	Tony Parker (22)	Tim Duncan (12)	Tony Parker (8)	Pepsi Center; 15,866	10–8
19	December 6	Golden State	W 123–88	Tim Duncan (20)	Tim Duncan (13)	Tony Parker (8)	AT&T Center; 17,740	11–8
20	December 9	@ Dallas	W 133–126 (2OT)	Tim Duncan (32)	Tim Duncan (14)	Tony Parker (10)	American Airlines Center; 19,937	12–8
21	December 10	Atlanta	W 95–89	Manu Ginóbili (27)	Matt Bonner (13)	George Hill (5)	AT&T Center; 18,161	13–8
22	December 12	@ Minnesota	W 98–86	Tony Parker, Tim Duncan (17)	Tim Duncan (13)	Tony Parker (9)	Target Center; 15,336	14–8
23	December 14	Oklahoma City	W 109–104	Tony Parker (22)	Tim Duncan (12)	Tony Parker (7)	AT&T Center; 17,419	15–8
24	December 17	@ New Orleans	L 83–90	Tony Parker (20)	Tim Duncan (11)	Manu Ginóbili (5)	New Orleans Arena; 16,593	15–9
25	December 18	@ Orlando	L 78–90	Tim Duncan (19)	Tim Duncan (9)	Tony Parker (4)	Amway Arena; 17,461	15–10
26	December 20	Toronto	W 107–97	Tony Parker (24)	Kurt Thomas (12)	Tony Parker (10)	AT&T Center; 17,227	16–10
27	December 22	Sacramento	W 101–85	Tony Parker (18)	Kurt Thomas (7)	Tony Parker (6)	AT&T Center; 18,372	17–10
28	December 23	Minnesota	W 99–93	Tony Parker (36)	Tim Duncan (12)	Tony Parker (8)	AT&T Center; 17,996	18–10
29	December 25	@ Phoenix	W 91–90	Tony Parker (27)	Tim Duncan (17)	Tony Parker (8)	US Airways Center; 18,422	19–10
30	December 27	Memphis	W 106–103 (2OT)	Tony Parker (32)	Michael Finley, Bruce Bowen (6)	Tony Parker, Michael Finley (5)	AT&T Center; 18,797	20–10
31	December 30	Milwaukee	L 98–100	Tim Duncan (22)	Tim Duncan (6)	Tony Parker (10)	AT&T Center; 18,797	20–11

January: 12–3 (home: 6–1; road: 6–2)

Game	Date	Team	Score	High points	High rebounds	High assists	Location Attendance	Record
32	January 2	@ Memphis	W 91–80	Tim Duncan (20)	Tim Duncan (10)	Manu Ginóbili (6)	FedExForum; 12,597	21–11
33	January 3	Philadelphia	W 108–106	Tim Duncan (26)	Tim Duncan (12)	Tony Parker (10)	AT&T Center; 18,797	22–11
34	January 5	@ Miami	W 91–84	Tim Duncan (19)	Tim Duncan (9)	Tony Parker (7)	American Airlines Arena; 19,600	23–11
35	January 8	L.A. Clippers	W 106–84	Tony Parker (19)	Kurt Thomas (9)	Tim Duncan (9)	AT&T Center; 17,873	24–11
36	January 11	Orlando	L 98–105	Tony Parker (31)	Tim Duncan (10)	Tony Parker (6)	AT&T Center; 18,216	24–12
37	January 14	L.A. Lakers	W 112–111	Manu Ginóbili (27)	Tim Duncan (10)	Tim Duncan (8)	AT&T Center; 18,797	25–12
38	January 16	@ Philadelphia	L 87–109	Tim Duncan (20)	Tim Duncan (12)	Tony Parker (6)	Wachovia Center; 18,739	25–13
39	January 17	@ Chicago	W 92–87	Manu Ginóbili (21)	Tim Duncan (14)	Tony Parker (8)	United Center; 22,100	26–13
40	January 19	@ Charlotte	W 86–84	Tim Duncan (17)	Tim Duncan (11)	Tony Parker (10)	Time Warner Cable Arena; 16,160	27–13
41	January 20	Indiana	W 99–81	Tim Duncan (27)	Tim Duncan (10)	Tony Parker (7)	AT&T Center; 18,181	28–13
42	January 23	New Jersey	W 94–91	Tim Duncan (30)	Tim Duncan (15)	Tim Duncan (5)	AT&T Center; 18,797	29–13
43	January 25	@ L.A. Lakers	L 85–99	Tony Parker (19)	Tim Duncan, Manu Ginóbili (8)	Tony Parker (6)	Staples Center; 18,997	29–14
44	January 27	@ Utah	W 106–100	Tony Parker, Tim Duncan (24)	Manu Ginóbili, Tim Duncan (9)	Tim Duncan (8)	EnergySolutions Arena; 19,911	30–14
45	January 29	@ Phoenix	W 114–104	Manu Ginóbili (30)	Tim Duncan (15)	Tony Parker (5)	US Airways Center; 18,422	31–14
46	January 31	New Orleans	W 106–93	Tony Parker (25)	Tim Duncan (8)	Tony Parker, Tim Duncan (7)	AT&T Center; 18,797	32–14

February: 7–4 (home: 2–1; road: 5–3)

Game	Date	Team	Score	High points	High rebounds	High assists	Location Attendance	Record
47	February 2	@ Golden State	W 110–105 (OT)	Manu Ginóbili, Tim Duncan (32)	Kurt Thomas, Tim Duncan (15)	Tony Parker (7)	Oracle Arena; 18,205	33–14
48	February 3	@ Denver	L 96–104	Roger Mason (26)	Matt Bonner (8)	Roger Mason (6)	Pepsi Center; 18,536	33–15
49	February 8	@ Boston	W 105–99	Tim Duncan, Matt Bonner (23)	Tim Duncan (13)	Tony Parker (7)	TD Banknorth Garden; 18,624	34–15
50	February 10	@ New Jersey	W 108–93	Tim Duncan (27)	Tim Duncan (9)	Tim Duncan (8)	Izod Center; 13,301	35–15
51	February 11	@ Toronto	L 89–91	Manu Ginóbili (32)	Tim Duncan (13)	Tim Duncan (7)	Air Canada Centre; 18,909	35–16
All-Star Break
52	February 17	@ New York	L 107–112 (OT)	Tim Duncan (26)	Tim Duncan (15)	Tony Parker (7)	Madison Square Garden; 19,763	35–17
53	February 19	@ Detroit	W 83–79	Tony Parker (19)	Tim Duncan (18)	Tony Parker (11)	The Palace of Auburn Hills; 22,076	36–17
54	February 21	@ Washington	W 98–67	Roger Mason (25)	Tim Duncan (11)	George Hill (6)	Verizon Center; 20,173	37–17
55	February 24	Dallas	W 93–76	Tony Parker (37)	Kurt Thomas (15)	Tony Parker (12)	AT&T Center; 18,797	38–17
56	February 25	Portland	W 99–84	Tony Parker (39)	Kurt Thomas (10)	Tony Parker (9)	AT&T Center; 18,672	39–17
57	February 27	Cleveland	L 86–97	Pops Mensah-Bonsu, Malik Hairston, Tony Parker, Michael Finley (11)	Michael Finley (7)	Tony Parker (6)	AT&T Center; 18,797	39–18

March: 9–8 (home: 6–4; road: 3–4)

Game	Date	Team	Score	High points	High rebounds	High assists	Location Attendance	Record
58	March 1	@ Portland	L 84–102	Tony Parker (15)	Fabricio Oberto (6)	George Hill, Tony Parker (4)	Rose Garden; 20,627	39–19
59	March 2	@ L.A. Clippers	W 106–78	Tony Parker (26)	Tim Duncan (12)	Tony Parker (10)	Staples Center; 17,649	40–19
60	March 4	@ Dallas	L 102–107	Tony Parker (37)	Tim Duncan (12)	Tim Duncan (5)	American Airlines Center; 20,316	40–20
61	March 6	Washington	W 100–78	Tony Parker (19)	Kurt Thomas (7)	Tony Parker (7)	AT&T Center; 18,440	41–20
62	March 8	Phoenix	W 103–98	Tony Parker (30)	Tim Duncan (15)	Tony Parker (9)	AT&T Center; 18,797	42–20
63	March 10	Charlotte	W 100–86	Roger Mason, Tony Parker (21)	Tim Duncan (11)	Tony Parker (7)	AT&T Center; 18,254	43–20
64	March 12	L.A. Lakers	L 95–102	Michael Finley, Tony Parker (25)	Tim Duncan (11)	Tony Parker (9)	AT&T Center; 18,797	43–21
65	March 14	@ Houston	W 88–85	Tony Parker (28)	Tim Duncan (12)	Tony Parker (8)	Toyota Center; 18,300	44–21
66	March 16	@ Oklahoma City	L 76–78	Tony Parker (28)	Tim Duncan (12)	Tony Parker (7)	Ford Center; 19,136	44–22
67	March 17	Minnesota	W 93–86	Tony Parker (24)	Kurt Thomas (10)	Tony Parker, Kurt Thomas (6)	AT&T Center; 18,797	45–22
68	March 20	Boston	L 77–80	Tony Parker (25)	Tim Duncan (9)	Tony Parker (8)	AT&T Center; 18,797	45–23
69	March 22	Houston	L 85–87	Tim Duncan (23)	Kurt Thomas (9)	Tony Parker (12)	AT&T Center; 18,797	45–24
70	March 24	Golden State	W 107–106	Tony Parker (30)	Tim Duncan (10)	Tony Parker (10)	AT&T Center; 18,797	46–24
71	March 25	@ Atlanta	W 102–92	Tony Parker (42)	Kurt Thomas (8)	Tony Parker (10)	Philips Arena; 18,529	47–24
72	March 27	L.A. Clippers	W 111–98	Tony Parker (18)	Roger Mason (8)	Manu Ginóbili (7)	AT&T Center; 18,797	48–24
73	March 29	@ New Orleans	L 86–90	Tony Parker (20)	Tim Duncan (15)	Tony Parker (7)	New Orleans Arena; 18,204	48–25
74	March 31	Oklahoma City	L 95–96	Tim Duncan (21)	Tim Duncan (12)	Tim Duncan, Michael Finley, Tony Parker (4)	AT&T Center; 18,797	48–26

April: 6–2 (home: 2–1; road: 4–1)

Game	Date	Team	Score	High points	High rebounds	High assists	Location Attendance	Record
75	April 3	@ Indiana	W 126–121	Tony Parker (31)	Tim Duncan (11)	Tony Parker (10)	Conseco Fieldhouse; 16,414	49–26
76	April 5	@ Cleveland	L 81–101	Tony Parker (24)	Kurt Thomas (9)	Tony Parker, Manu Ginóbili (4)	Quicken Loans Arena; 20,562	49–27
77	April 7	@ Oklahoma City	W 99–89	Tim Duncan (25)	Tim Duncan (15)	Tony Parker (10)	Ford Center; 19,136	50–27
78	April 8	Portland	L 83–95	Roger Mason (18)	Tony Parker, Kurt Thomas, Tim Duncan (5)	Tony Parker (7)	AT&T Center; 18,797	50–28
79	April 10	Utah	W 105–99	Tony Parker (31)	Tim Duncan (9)	Tony Parker (7)	AT&T Center; 18,797	51–28
80	April 12	@ Sacramento	W 95–92	Tony Parker (25)	Kurt Thomas (13)	Tony Parker (9)	ARCO Arena; 13,330	52–28
81	April 13	@ Golden State	W 101–72	Drew Gooden (20)	Drew Gooden (15)	Tim Duncan, Michael Finley (4)	Oracle Arena; 19,596	53–28
82	April 15	New Orleans	W 105–98 (OT)	Tony Parker (29)	Tim Duncan (19)	Duncan, Parker (6)	AT&T Center; 18,797	54–28

2008–09 season schedule

== Playoffs ==
2009 playoff game log
First Round: 1–4 (home: 1–2; road: 0–2)

Game	Date	Team	Score	High points	High rebounds	High assists	Location Attendance	Series
1	April 18	Dallas	L 97–105	Tim Duncan (27)	Tim Duncan (9)	Tony Parker (8)	AT&T Center; 18,797	0–1
2	April 20	Dallas	W 105–84	Tony Parker (38)	Tim Duncan (11)	Tony Parker (8)	AT&T Center; 18,797	1–1
3	April 23	@ Dallas	L 67–88	Tony Parker (12)	Kurt Thomas (10)	Tony Parker (3)	American Airlines Center; 20,491	1–2
4	April 25	@ Dallas	L 90–99	Tony Parker (43)	Tim Duncan (10)	Tim Duncan (7)	American Airlines Center; 20,829	1–3
5	April 28	Dallas	L 93–106	Tim Duncan (31)	Tim Duncan (12)	Tony Parker (6)	AT&T Center; 20,829	1–4

2009 playoff schedule

== Player statistics ==
=== Ragular season ===
Player	POS	GP	GS	MP	REB	AST	STL	BLK	PTS	MPG	RPG	APG	SPG	BPG	PPG
Roger Mason Jr.	SG	82	71	2,496	251	173	40	12	969	30.4	3.1	2.1	.5	.1	11.8
Michael Finley	SF	81	77	2,336	270	114	37	17	784	28.8	3.3	1.4	.5	.2	9.7
Matt Bonner	PF	81	67	1,928	386	82	47	26	667	23.8	4.8	1.0	.6	.3	8.2
Bruce Bowen	SF	80	10	1,506	145	40	36	13	214	18.8	1.8	.5	.5	.2	2.7
Kurt Thomas	PF	79	10	1,404	405	66	34	58	343	17.8	5.1	.8	.4	.7	4.3
George Hill	PG	77	7	1,270	158	136	45	21	438	16.5	2.1	1.8	.6	.3	5.7
Tim Duncan	C	75	75	2,524	800	264	38	126	1,450	33.7	10.7	3.5	.5	1.7	19.3
Tony Parker	PG	72	71	2,456	223	496	67	4	1,581	34.1	3.1	6.9	.9	.1	22.0
Ime Udoka	SF	67	3	1,035	187	54	36	12	289	15.4	2.8	.8	.5	.2	4.3
Fabricio Oberto	C	54	11	677	142	59	7	11	142	12.5	2.6	1.1	.1	.2	2.6
Manu Ginóbili	SG	44	7	1,181	198	157	64	16	683	26.8	4.5	3.6	1.5	.4	15.5
Jacque Vaughn	PG	30	0	292	22	55	6	0	65	9.7	.7	1.8	.2	.0	2.2
Drew Gooden^{†}	PF	19	1	320	83	3	4	4	187	16.8	4.4	.2	.2	.2	9.8
Anthony Tolliver	PF	19	0	208	41	17	5	1	52	10.9	2.2	.9	.3	.1	2.7
Malik Hairston	SG	15	0	155	28	13	6	7	50	10.3	1.9	.9	.4	.5	3.3
Desmon Farmer	SG	3	0	54	6	2	0	0	13	18.0	2.0	.7	.0	.0	4.3
Austin Croshere^{†}	PF	3	0	23	10	3	0	0	4	7.7	3.3	1.0	.0	.0	1.3
Pops Mensah-Bonsu^{†}	PF	3	0	20	10	0	1	1	15	6.7	3.3	.0	.3	.3	5.0
Blake Ahearn	PG	3	0	19	1	2	1	0	8	6.3	.3	.7	.3	.0	2.7
Marcus Williams	PF	2	0	3	0	0	0	0	4	1.5	.0	.0	.0	.0	2.0

- ^{†} Denotes player spent time with another team in the season. Stats reflect time with the Spurs only.

=== Playoffs ===
Player	POS	GP	GS	MP	REB	AST	STL	BLK	PTS	MPG	RPG	APG	SPG	BPG	PPG
Tony Parker	PG	5	5	181	21	34	6	1	143	36.2	4.2	6.8	1.2	.2	28.6
Tim Duncan	C	5	5	164	40	16	3	6	99	32.8	8.0	3.2	.6	1.2	19.8
Michael Finley	SF	5	5	143	15	5	1	1	40	28.6	3.0	1.0	.2	.2	8.0
Matt Bonner	PF	5	5	100	16	0	3	2	15	20.0	3.2	.0	.6	.4	3.0
Roger Mason Jr.	SG	5	3	108	8	9	1	0	33	21.6	1.6	1.8	.2	.0	6.6
Bruce Bowen	SF	5	2	130	15	3	3	0	21	26.0	3.0	.6	.6	.0	4.2
Ime Udoka	SF	5	0	104	23	4	4	1	17	20.8	4.6	.8	.8	.2	3.4
Kurt Thomas	PF	5	0	80	23	2	1	2	13	16.0	4.6	.4	.2	.4	2.6
George Hill	PG	4	0	76	8	2	2	1	23	19.0	2.0	.5	.5	.3	5.8
Drew Gooden	PF	4	0	71	15	1	1	1	29	17.8	3.8	.3	.3	.3	7.3
Fabricio Oberto	C	2	0	22	4	0	2	0	12	11.0	2.0	.0	1.0	.0	6.0
Jacque Vaughn	PG	2	0	21	0	4	1	0	7	10.5	.0	2.0	.5	.0	3.5

== Awards and records ==
=== Awards ===
- Tim Duncan: 2009 All-NBA Second Team
- Tony Parker: 2009 Third-team All-NBA
- Tim Duncan: 2009 NBA All-Defensive Second Team

=== Records ===
Tim Duncan became the first player in NBA history to be an All-NBA selection in his first twelve seasons. Duncan is one of only eight players in the history of the league to be selected twelve times.

== Transactions ==
=== Free agents ===
==== Additions ====
Player	Signed	Former team
Drew Gooden	March 1, 2009	Sacramento Kings

==== Subtractions ====
Player	Left	New team

== See also ==
- 2008–09 NBA season
