= 2008–09 Los Angeles Clippers season =

NBA professional basketball team season

- Head coach: Mike Dunleavy, Sr.
- Arena: Staples Center

Results
- Record: 19–63 (.232)
- Place: Division: 4th (Pacific); Conference: 14th (Western)
- Playoff finish: Did not qualify
- Stats at Basketball Reference

Local media
- Television: Prime Ticket, KTLA
- Radio: KSPN

The 2008–09 Los Angeles Clippers season was the 39th season of the franchise in the National Basketball Association (NBA). This season marks the team's 25th season in the city of Los Angeles. For the third straight year, the Clippers missed the playoffs.

== Key dates ==
- June 26: The 2008 NBA draft took place in New York City.
- July 1: The free agency period started.

== Draft picks ==
| Round | Pick | Player | Position | Nationality | College |
|---|---|---|---|---|---|
| 1 | 7 | Eric Gordon | Shooting guard | United States | Indiana |
| 2 | 35 | DeAndre Jordan | Center | United States | Texas A&M |

== Roster ==
2008–09 Los Angeles Clippers roster
Players

| Pos. | No. | Player | Height | Weight | DOB | From |
|---|---|---|---|---|---|---|
| G | 3 | Alex Acker | 6 ft 5 in (1.96 m) | 185 lb (84 kg) | | Pepperdine |
| F/C | 23 | Marcus Camby | 6 ft 11 in (2.11 m) | 235 lb (107 kg) | | UMass |
| G | 25 | Mardy Collins | 6 ft 6 in (1.98 m) | 220 lb (100 kg) | | Temple |
| G | 1 | Baron Davis | 6 ft 3 in (1.91 m) | 215 lb (98 kg) | | UCLA |
| F | 31 | Ricky Davis | 6 ft 7 in (2.01 m) | 195 lb (88 kg) | | Iowa |
| G | 10 | Eric Gordon | 6 ft 3 in (1.91 m) | 222 lb (101 kg) | | Indiana |
| G | 6 | Jason Hart | 6 ft 3 in (1.91 m) | 180 lb (82 kg) | | Syracuse |
| G | 2 | Fred Jones | 6 ft 2 in (1.88 m) | 225 lb (102 kg) | | Oregon |
| F/C | 9 | DeAndre Jordan | 6 ft 11 in (2.11 m) | 250 lb (113 kg) | | Texas A&M |
| C | 35 | Chris Kaman | 7 ft 0 in (2.13 m) | 265 lb (120 kg) | | Central Michigan |
| F | 20 | Steve Novak | 6 ft 10 in (2.08 m) | 220 lb (100 kg) | | Marquette |
| F | 50 | Zach Randolph | 6 ft 9 in (2.06 m) | 260 lb (118 kg) | | Michigan State |
| C | 34 | Cheikh Samb | 7 ft 1 in (2.16 m) | 245 lb (111 kg) | | Senegal |
| F/C | 8 | Brian Skinner | 6 ft 11 in (2.11 m) | 215 lb (98 kg) | | Baylor |
| G | 4 | Mike Taylor | 6 ft 2 in (1.88 m) | 165 lb (75 kg) | | Iowa State |
| F | 12 | Al Thornton | 6 ft 8 in (2.03 m) | 220 lb (100 kg) | | Florida State |

Coaches
Head coach
- Mike Dunleavy (South Carolina)
Assistant(s)
- Kim Hughes (Wisconsin)
- Tony Brown (Arkansas)
- Fred Vinson (Georgia Tech)

Legend
- (DP) Unsigned draft pick
- (FA) Free agent
- (S) Suspended
- Injured

=== Roster notes ===
- This is Jason Hart's second tour of duty with the franchise. He previously played for the team in 2006–2007.
- This is also Brian Skinner's second tour of duty with the franchise as well. He previously played for the team from 1998 to 2001.

== Regular season ==
=== Standings ===
| Pacific Division | W | L | PCT | GB | Home | Road | Div | GP |
|---|---|---|---|---|---|---|---|---|
| c-Los Angeles Lakers | 65 | 17 | .793 | — | 36–5 | 29–12 | 14–2 | 82 |
| Phoenix Suns | 46 | 36 | .561 | 19 | 28–13 | 18–23 | 11–5 | 82 |
| Golden State Warriors | 29 | 53 | .354 | 36 | 21–20 | 8–33 | 6–10 | 82 |
| Los Angeles Clippers | 19 | 63 | .232 | 46 | 11–30 | 8–33 | 2–14 | 82 |
| Sacramento Kings | 17 | 65 | .207 | 48 | 11–30 | 6–35 | 7–9 | 82 |

| # | Western Conference | | | | |
| # | Team | W | L | PCT | GB |
|---|---|---|---|---|---|
| 1 | c-Los Angeles Lakers | 65 | 17 | .793 | — |
| 2 | y-Denver Nuggets | 54 | 28 | .659 | 11 |
| 3 | y-San Antonio Spurs | 54 | 28 | .659 | 11 |
| 4 | x-Portland Trail Blazers | 54 | 28 | .659 | 11 |
| 5 | x-Houston Rockets | 53 | 29 | .646 | 12 |
| 6 | x-Dallas Mavericks | 50 | 32 | .610 | 15 |
| 7 | x-New Orleans Hornets | 49 | 33 | .598 | 16 |
| 8 | x-Utah Jazz | 48 | 34 | .585 | 17 |
| 9 | Phoenix Suns | 46 | 36 | .561 | 19 |
| 10 | Golden State Warriors | 29 | 53 | .354 | 36 |
| 11 | Memphis Grizzlies | 24 | 58 | .293 | 41 |
| 12 | Minnesota Timberwolves | 24 | 58 | .293 | 41 |
| 13 | Oklahoma City Thunder | 23 | 59 | .280 | 42 |
| 14 | Los Angeles Clippers | 19 | 63 | .232 | 46 |
| 15 | Sacramento Kings | 17 | 65 | .207 | 48 |

=== Game log ===
2008–09 game log
October: 0–2 (home: 0–2; road: 0–0)

| Game | Date | Team | Score | High points | High rebounds | High assists | Location Attendance | Record |
|---|---|---|---|---|---|---|---|---|
| 1 | October 29 | L.A. Lakers | L 79–117 | Al Thornton (16) | Tim Thomas (8) | Baron Davis (7) | Staples Center; 19,060 | 0–1 |
| 2 | October 31 | Denver | L 103–113 (OT) | Al Thornton (30) | Chris Kaman (15) | Cuttino Mobley, Mike Taylor (3) | Staples Center; 11,418 | 0–2 |

November: 3–11 (home: 2–7; road: 1–4)

| Game | Date | Team | Score | High points | High rebounds | High assists | Location Attendance | Record |
|---|---|---|---|---|---|---|---|---|
| 3 | November 1 | @ Utah | L 79–101 | Cuttino Mobley (20) | Chris Kaman (12) | Mike Taylor (4) | EnergySolutions Arena; 19,602 | 0–3 |
| 4 | November 3 | Utah | L 73–89 | Chris Kaman (19) | Chris Kaman (10) | Baron Davis (9) | Staples Center; 12,712 | 0–4 |
| 5 | November 5 | @ L.A. Lakers | L 88–106 | Al Thornton (22) | Tim Thomas, Chris Kaman (11) | Baron Davis (7) | Staples Center; 18,997 | 0–5 |
| 6 | November 7 | Houston | L 83–92 | Baron Davis, Chris Kaman (23) | Marcus Camby (13) | Baron Davis (8) | Staples Center; 14,670 | 0–6 |
| 7 | November 9 | Dallas | W 103–92 | Baron Davis (22) | Marcus Camby (14) | Baron Davis (10) | Staples Center; 14,249 | 1–6 |
| 8 | November 12 | Sacramento | L 98–103 | Al Thornton (20) | Chris Kaman (6) | Baron Davis (11) | Staples Center; 13,266 | 1–7 |
| 9 | November 15 | Golden State | L 103–121 | Baron Davis (25) | Chris Kaman (13) | Baron Davis (11) | Staples Center; 12,823 | 1–8 |
| 10 | November 17 | San Antonio | L 83–86 | Cuttino Mobley (18) | Chris Kaman (13) | Baron Davis (8) | Staples Center; 14,962 | 1–9 |
| 11 | November 19 | @ Oklahoma City | W 108–88 | Chris Kaman (25) | Chris Kaman (14) | Baron Davis (8) | Ford Center; 18,312 | 2–9 |
| 12 | November 21 | @ Philadelphia | L 88–89 | Al Thornton (22) | Al Thornton, Chris Kaman, Marcus Camby (9) | Baron Davis (6) | Wachovia Center; 13,474 | 2–10 |
| 13 | November 22 | @ New Jersey | L 95–112 | Baron Davis (30) | Marcus Camby (13) | Baron Davis (10) | Izod Center; 17,677 | 2–11 |
| 14 | November 24 | New Orleans | L 87–99 | Eric Gordon (25) | Marcus Camby (11) | Baron Davis (8) | Staples Center; 14,956 | 2–12 |
| 15 | November 26 | Denver | L 105–106 | Eric Gordon (24) | Marcus Camby (11) | Baron Davis (10) | Staples Center; 14,934 | 2–13 |
| 16 | November 29 | Miami | W 97–96 | Al Thornton, Zach Randolph (27) | Zach Randolph (13) | Baron Davis (9) | Staples Center; 16,245 | 3–13 |

December: 5–10 (home: 1–4; road: 4–6)

| Game | Date | Team | Score | High points | High rebounds | High assists | Location Attendance | Record |
|---|---|---|---|---|---|---|---|---|
| 17 | December 2 | @ Dallas | L 98–100 | Zach Randolph (27) | Marcus Camby (15) | Baron Davis (6) | American Airlines Center; 19,670 | 3–14 |
| 18 | December 3 | @ Houston | L 96–103 | Al Thornton (24) | Zach Randolph, Marcus Camby (11) | Baron Davis (9) | Toyota Center; 15,358 | 3–15 |
| 19 | December 5 | @ Memphis | L 81–93 | Baron Davis (23) | Marcus Camby (10) | Baron Davis (8) | FedExForum; 10,484 | 3–16 |
| 20 | December 6 | @ Minnesota | W 107–84 | Baron Davis (27) | Marcus Camby (19) | Baron Davis (9) | Target Center; 10,863 | 4–16 |
| 21 | December 8 | Orlando | L 88–95 | Baron Davis (27) | Marcus Camby (17) | Baron Davis (7) | Staples Center; 15,222 | 4–17 |
| 22 | December 12 | @ Portland | W 120–112 (2OT) | Zach Randolph (38) | Marcus Camby (13) | Baron Davis (6) | Rose Garden; 20,558 | 5–17 |
| 23 | December 13 | Houston | W 95–82 | Zach Randolph (30) | Zach Randolph, Marcus Camby (13) | Baron Davis (9) | Staples Center; 16,203 | 6–17 |
| 24 | December 16 | @ Oklahoma City | W 98–88 | Eric Gordon, Zach Randolph (22) | Marcus Camby (15) | Baron Davis (7) | Ford Center; 18,275 | 7–17 |
| 25 | December 17 | @ Chicago | L 109–115 (OT) | Zach Randolph (30) | Marcus Camby (27) | Baron Davis (12) | United Center; 20,102 | 7–18 |
| 26 | December 19 | @ Indiana | W 117–109 (2OT) | Zach Randolph (34) | Zach Randolph (16) | Baron Davis (11) | Conseco Fieldhouse; 12,653 | 8–18 |
| 27 | December 20 | @ Milwaukee | L 85–119 | Al Thornton (20) | Marcus Camby (11) | Jason Hart (7) | Bradley Center; 15,014 | 8–19 |
| 28 | December 22 | Toronto | L 75–97 | Eric Gordon, Zach Randolph (19) | Al Thornton (9) | Baron Davis (9) | Staples Center; 16,094 | 8–20 |
| 29 | December 28 | Dallas | L 76–98 | Al Thornton, Marcus Camby (16) | Marcus Camby (12) | Baron Davis (9) | Staples Center; 16,685 | 8–21 |
| 30 | December 30 | @ Sacramento | L 90–92 | Eric Gordon (24) | Marcus Camby (24) | Marcus Camby, Baron Davis (4) | ARCO Arena; 11,420 | 8–22 |
| 31 | December 31 | Philadelphia | L 92–100 | Al Thornton (24) | Marcus Camby (17) | Baron Davis (8) | Staples Center; 14,021 | 8–23 |

January: 2–14 (home: 2–7; road: 0–7)

| Game | Date | Team | Score | High points | High rebounds | High assists | Location Attendance | Record |
|---|---|---|---|---|---|---|---|---|
| 32 | January 2 | @ Phoenix | L 98–106 | Eric Gordon (21) | Marcus Camby (23) | Fred Jones, Marcus Camby (4) | US Airways Center; 18,422 | 8–24 |
| 33 | January 4 | Detroit | L 87–88 | Eric Gordon (31) | Marcus Camby (20) | Mardy Collins (12) | Staples Center; 17,968 | 8–25 |
| 34 | January 6 | @ Dallas | L 102–107 | Eric Gordon (32) | Marcus Camby (19) | Eric Gordon (6) | American Airlines Center; 19,794 | 8–26 |
| 35 | January 8 | @ San Antonio | L 84–106 | Al Thornton, Eric Gordon (21) | Marcus Camby (9) | Jason Hart (4) | AT&T Center; 17,873 | 8–27 |
| 36 | January 9 | @ New Orleans | L 80–107 | Eric Gordon, Mardy Collins (15) | Marcus Camby (17) | Mardy Collins (6) | New Orleans Arena; 17,815 | 8–28 |
| 37 | January 11 | Phoenix | L 103–109 | Al Thornton (23) | Marcus Camby (18) | Fred Jones (10) | Staples Center; 17,307 | 8–29 |
| 38 | January 14 | Atlanta | L 80–97 | Al Thornton (25) | Marcus Camby (18) | Mardy Collins (8) | Staples Center; 15,901 | 8–30 |
| 39 | January 17 | Milwaukee | W 101–92 | Brian Skinner, Marcus Camby (18) | Marcus Camby (11) | Mardy Collins (11) | Staples Center; 16,448 | 9–30 |
| 40 | January 19 | Minnesota | L 86–94 | Eric Gordon (25) | DeAndre Jordan (10) | Mardy Collins (8) | Staples Center; 14,399 | 9–31 |
| 41 | January 21 | L.A. Lakers | L 97–108 | DeAndre Jordan (23) | DeAndre Jordan (12) | Eric Gordon (6) | Staples Center; 19,627 | 9–32 |
| 42 | January 23 | Oklahoma City | W 107–104 | Eric Gordon (41) | Cheikh Samb (8) | Ricky Davis (11) | Staples Center; 14,913 | 10–32 |
| 43 | January 25 | @ Golden State | L 92–107 | Eric Gordon (21) | DeAndre Jordan (20) | Ricky Davis (7) | Oracle Arena; 17,746 | 10–33 |
| 44 | January 26 | Portland | L 88–113 | Al Thornton (23) | Brian Skinner (10) | Fred Jones, Eric Gordon (7) | Staples Center; 16,570 | 10–34 |
| 45 | January 28 | Chicago | L 75–95 | Eric Gordon (19) | Al Thornton, DeAndre Jordan, Marcus Camby (6) | Eric Gordon (7) | Staples Center; 15,637 | 10–35 |
| 46 | January 30 | @ Cleveland | L 95–112 | Eric Gordon (27) | Eric Gordon, Baron Davis (7) | Fred Jones (9) | Quicken Loans Arena; 20,562 | 10–36 |
| 47 | January 31 | @ Washington | L 94–106 | Eric Gordon (25) | Brian Skinner (10) | Baron Davis, Fred Jones (6) | Verizon Center; 18,227 | 10–37 |

February: 5–8 (home: 3–2; road: 2–6)

| Game | Date | Team | Score | High points | High rebounds | High assists | Location Attendance | Record |
|---|---|---|---|---|---|---|---|---|
| 48 | February 2 | @ Miami | L 95–119 | Zach Randolph (21) | Al Thornton, Marcus Camby (7) | Baron Davis (9) | American Airlines Arena; 15,985 | 10–38 |
| 49 | February 4 | @ Orlando | L 96–125 | Al Thornton (27) | Marcus Camby (9) | Fred Jones (6) | Amway Arena; 16,101 | 10–39 |
| 50 | February 6 | @ Memphis | W 126–105 | Zach Randolph (35) | Marcus Camby (11) | Baron Davis (8) | FedExForum; 10,912 | 11–39 |
| 51 | February 7 | @ Atlanta | W 121–97 | Al Thornton (31) | Zach Randolph (9) | Fred Jones (9) | Philips Arena; 18,729 | 12–39 |
| 52 | February 9 | @ Charlotte | L 73–94 | Zach Randolph (20) | Marcus Camby (11) | Baron Davis (8) | Time Warner Cable Arena; 10,852 | 12–40 |
| 53 | February 11 | New York | W 128–124 (OT) | Eric Gordon (30) | Zach Randolph (15) | Baron Davis (20) | Staples Center; 16,928 | 13–40 |
| 54 | February 17 | @ Phoenix | L 100–140 | Eric Gordon (24) | DeAndre Jordan (7) | Baron Davis (6) | US Airways Center; 18,422 | 13–41 |
| 55 | February 18 | Phoenix | L 119–142 | Al Thornton (33) | DeAndre Jordan (11) | Baron Davis (7) | Staples Center; 18,169 | 13–42 |
| 56 | February 22 | @ Portland | L 87–116 | Eric Gordon (21) | DeAndre Jordan (12) | Baron Davis (6) | Rose Garden; 20,447 | 13–43 |
| 57 | February 23 | Golden State | W 118–105 | Zach Randolph, Eric Gordon (27) | Zach Randolph (11) | Baron Davis (10) | Staples Center; 15,383 | 14–43 |
| 58 | February 25 | Boston | W 93–91 | Zach Randolph (30) | Zach Randolph (12) | Mardy Collins, Baron Davis (5) | Staples Center; 18,609 | 15–43 |
| 59 | February 27 | @ Sacramento | L 86–98 | Steve Novak, Baron Davis (13) | Marcus Camby (13) | Mike Taylor (5) | ARCO Arena; 12,846 | 15–44 |
| 60 | February 28 | Charlotte | L 95–100 | Zach Randolph (33) | Marcus Camby (13) | Baron Davis, Ricky Davis (6) | Staples Center; 16,349 | 15–45 |

March: 3–11 (home: 2–4; road: 1–7)

| Game | Date | Team | Score | High points | High rebounds | High assists | Location Attendance | Record |
|---|---|---|---|---|---|---|---|---|
| 61 | March 2 | San Antonio | L 78–106 | Fred Jones, Al Thornton (14) | Mike Taylor, Marcus Camby (8) | Baron Davis (8) | Staples Center; 17,649 | 15–46 |
| 62 | March 4 | Memphis | L 95–118 | Al Thornton (25) | DeAndre Jordan (9) | Baron Davis (7) | Staples Center; 13,813 | 15–47 |
| 63 | March 7 | Indiana | L 105–106 | Eric Gordon (35) | DeAndre Jordan (11) | Eric Gordon (6) | Staples Center; 16,518 | 15–48 |
| 64 | March 10 | Cleveland | L 83–87 | Al Thornton, Zach Randolph (20) | Zach Randolph (12) | Baron Davis, Zach Randolph (6) | Staples Center; 19,060 | 15–49 |
| 65 | March 14 | @ Denver | L 94–107 | Al Thornton (19) | Al Thornton, Marcus Camby, Chris Kaman (7) | Baron Davis (10) | Pepsi Center; 18,676 | 15–50 |
| 66 | March 15 | New Jersey | W 107–105 | Steve Novak (21) | Al Thornton, Chris Kaman (8) | Baron Davis (10) | Staples Center; 18,266 | 16–50 |
| 67 | March 17 | @ Golden State | L 120–127 | Baron Davis (29) | Zach Randolph, Marcus Camby (11) | Baron Davis (7) | Oracle Arena; 18,223 | 16–51 |
| 68 | March 18 | Washington | W 123–108 | Eric Gordon (26) | Baron Davis, Zach Randolph (8) | Baron Davis (20) | Staples Center; 15,123 | 17–51 |
| 69 | March 20 | @ Detroit | L 90–108 | Eric Gordon (22) | Chris Kaman (8) | Baron Davis (8) | The Palace of Auburn Hills; 22,076 | 17–52 |
| 70 | March 22 | @ Toronto | L 76–100 | Zach Randolph (20) | Zach Randolph, Marcus Camby (7) | Baron Davis (4) | Air Canada Centre; 17,610 | 17–53 |
| 71 | March 23 | @ Boston | L 77–90 | Zach Randolph (17) | Zach Randolph (14) | Baron Davis (8) | TD Banknorth Garden; 18,624 | 17–54 |
| 72 | March 25 | @ New York | W 140–135 (OT) | Mike Taylor (35) | Al Thornton (9) | Baron Davis (6) | Madison Square Garden; 19,041 | 18–54 |
| 73 | March 27 | @ San Antonio | L 98–111 | Mike Taylor (23) | Alex Acker (8) | Eric Gordon (4) | AT&T Center; 18,797 | 18–55 |
| 74 | March 28 | @ Houston | L 93–110 | Eric Gordon (17) | Zach Randolph (8) | Mike Taylor (6) | Toyota Center; 18,267 | 18–56 |

April: 1–7 (home: 1–4; road: 0–3)

| Game | Date | Team | Score | High points | High rebounds | High assists | Location Attendance | Record |
|---|---|---|---|---|---|---|---|---|
| 75 | April 1 | New Orleans | L 98–104 | Eric Gordon (25) | Zach Randolph (14) | Baron Davis (12) | Staples Center; 19,060 | 18–57 |
| 76 | April 4 | @ Denver | L 104–120 | Zach Randolph (22) | Zach Randolph (12) | Baron Davis (8) | Pepsi Center; 17,880 | 18–58 |
| 77 | April 5 | @ L.A. Lakers | L 85–88 | Eric Gordon (24) | Brian Skinner (13) | Eric Gordon (4) | Staples Center; 18,997 | 18–59 |
| 78 | April 7 | Minnesota | L 77–87 | Eric Gordon (28) | Brian Skinner (14) | Fred Jones (7) | Staples Center; 16,757 | 18–60 |
| 79 | April 10 | Sacramento | W 109–78 | Brian Skinner (21) | Chris Kaman (13) | Baron Davis (5) | Staples Center; 18,232 | 19–60 |
| 80 | April 11 | Portland | L 72–87 | Eric Gordon (18) | Chris Kaman (8) | Fred Jones (5) | Staples Center; 18,321 | 19–61 |
| 81 | April 13 | @ Utah | L 85–106 | Marcus Camby (17) | DeAndre Jordan (11) | Baron Davis (7) | EnergySolutions Arena; 19,911 | 19–62 |
| 82 | April 15 | Oklahoma City | L 85–126 | Eric Gordon (22) | Marcus Camby (7) | Baron Davis, Fred Jones (5) | Staples Center; 19,060 | 19–63 |

2015–16 season schedule

== Player statistics ==
Legend
| GP | Games played | GS | Games started | MPG | Minutes per game |
| FG% | Field-goal percentage | 3P% | 3-point field-goal percentage | FT% | Free-throw percentage |
| RPG | Rebounds per game | APG | Assists per game | SPG | Steals per game |
| BPG | Blocks per game | PPG | Points per game |

=== Regular season ===
| Player | GP | GS | MPG | FG% | 3P% | FT% | RPG | APG | SPG | BPG | PPG |
|---|---|---|---|---|---|---|---|---|---|---|---|
| Eric Gordon | 78 | 65 | 34.3 | .456 | .389 | .854 | 2.6 | 2.8 | 1.0 | .4 | 16.1 |
| Al Thornton | 71 | 67 | 37.4 | .446 | .253 | .754 | 5.2 | 1.5 | .8 | .9 | 16.8 |
| Steve Novak | 71 | 3 | 16.4 | .444 | .416 | .913 | 1.8 | .6 | .3 | .1 | 6.9 |
| Baron Davis | 65 | 60 | 34.6 | .370 | .302 | .757 | 3.7 | 7.7 | 1.7 | .5 | 14.9 |
| Marcus Camby | 62 | 55 | 31.0 | .512 | .250 | .725 | 11.1 | 2.0 | .8 | 2.1 | 10.3 |
| DeAndre Jordan | 53 | 13 | 14.5 | .633 | | .385 | 4.5 | .2 | .2 | 1.1 | 4.3 |
| Fred Jones | 52 | 21 | 28.8 | .407 | .367 | .815 | 2.4 | 3.6 | 1.0 | .2 | 7.3 |
| Brian Skinner | 51 | 21 | 16.5 | .449 | .000 | .638 | 4.0 | .5 | .3 | 1.0 | 4.2 |
| Mike Taylor | 51 | 5 | 15.1 | .412 | .325 | .691 | 1.7 | 2.1 | .7 | .0 | 5.7 |
| Zach Randolph^{†} | 39 | 34 | 35.1 | .487 | .342 | .701 | 9.4 | 2.3 | .8 | .3 | 20.9 |
| Mardy Collins^{†} | 39 | 14 | 20.9 | .433 | .464 | .649 | 2.5 | 2.6 | .7 | .3 | 5.9 |
| Ricky Davis | 36 | 9 | 21.8 | .339 | .315 | .861 | 1.7 | 2.3 | .5 | .1 | 6.4 |
| Chris Kaman | 31 | 24 | 29.7 | .528 | | .680 | 8.0 | 1.5 | .5 | 1.5 | 12.0 |
| Jason Hart^{†} | 28 | 2 | 11.1 | .298 | .000 | .789 | 1.5 | 1.5 | .4 | .1 | 2.3 |
| Paul Davis | 27 | 1 | 11.9 | .408 | .000 | .794 | 2.5 | .4 | .4 | .1 | 4.0 |
| Alex Acker^{†} | 18 | 0 | 9.9 | .400 | .438 | .500 | 1.2 | .6 | .2 | .2 | 3.5 |
| Cuttino Mobley | 11 | 11 | 33.2 | .432 | .343 | .722 | 2.6 | 1.1 | 1.4 | .2 | 13.7 |
| Tim Thomas^{†} | 10 | 5 | 22.0 | .378 | .300 | .618 | 4.6 | 1.0 | .3 | .1 | 9.5 |
| Cheikh Samb^{†} | 10 | 0 | 5.1 | .250 | .000 | .600 | 1.3 | .0 | .1 | .5 | 1.1 |

- ^{†} Denotes player spent time with another team in the season. Stats reflect time with the Clippers only.

== Transactions ==
=== Trades ===
June 26, 2008
To Los Angeles Clippers

- Draft rights to Mike Taylor
To Portland Trail Blazers

- 2009 second-round draft pick
July 15, 2008
To Los Angeles Clippers

- Marcus Camby & 2010 2nd-round draft pick (54th pick)
To Denver Nuggets

- 2010 2nd-round draft pick (38th pick)
July 23, 2008
To Los Angeles Clippers

- Jason Hart
To Utah Jazz

- Brevin Knight
August 6, 2008
To Los Angeles Clippers

- Steve Novak
To Houston Rockets

- Option to swap 2011 second-round draft picks
November 21, 2008
To Los Angeles Clippers

- Mardy Collins and Zach Randolph
To New York Knicks

- Cuttino Mobley and Tim Thomas
January 1, 2009
To Los Angeles Clippers

- Hassan Adams
To Toronto Raptors

- Cash and 2015 second-round draft pick
January 5, 2009
To Los Angeles Clippers

- Cheikh Samb
To Denver Nuggets

- Cash and 2015 second-round draft pick
February 16, 2009
To Los Angeles Clippers

- Alex Acker and 2011 second-round draft pick
To Detroit Pistons

- 2013 second-round draft pick

=== Free agents ===
==== Additions ====
| Player | Signed | Former team |
| Baron Davis | July 1 (5 years, $65 million) | Golden State Warriors |
| Ricky Davis | July 28 | Miami Heat |
| Brian Skinner | July 31 | Phoenix Suns |
| Jason Williams | August 7 retired September 26 | Miami Heat |
| Fred Jones | December 28 waived January 5 re-signed January 9 | New York Knicks |

==== Subtractions ====
| Player | Left | New team |
| Elton Brand | free agency, July 9 | Philadelphia 76ers |
| Smush Parker | renounced, July 9 | Denver Nuggets |
| Shaun Livingston | released, July 10 | Miami Heat |
| Corey Maggette | free agency, July 10 | Golden State Warriors |
| Dan Dickau | waived, July 10 | Brose Baskets (BBL) |
| Josh Powell | waived, July 30 | Los Angeles Lakers |
| Nick Fazekas | free agency, August 1 | Denver Nuggets |
| Quinton Ross | free agency, September 26 | Memphis Grizzlies |
| Hassan Adams | waived, January 1 | KK Vojvodina (KLS) |
| Paul Davis | waived, January 5 | Washington Wizards |
| Cheikh Samb | waived, February 16 | New York Knicks |
| Jason Hart | waived, February 27 | Denver Nuggets |
| Marcus Williams | released, March 10 | San Antonio Spurs |
