= 2008–09 Memphis Grizzlies season =

- Head coach: Marc Iavaroni; Lionel Hollins
- General manager: Chris Wallace
- Owners: Michael Heisley
- Arena: FedExForum

Results
- Record: 24–58 (.293)
- Place: Division: 5th (Southwest); Conference: 11th (Western)
- Playoff finish: Did not qualify
- Stats at Basketball Reference

Local media
- Television: Fox Sports South, SportSouth
- Radio: WRBO

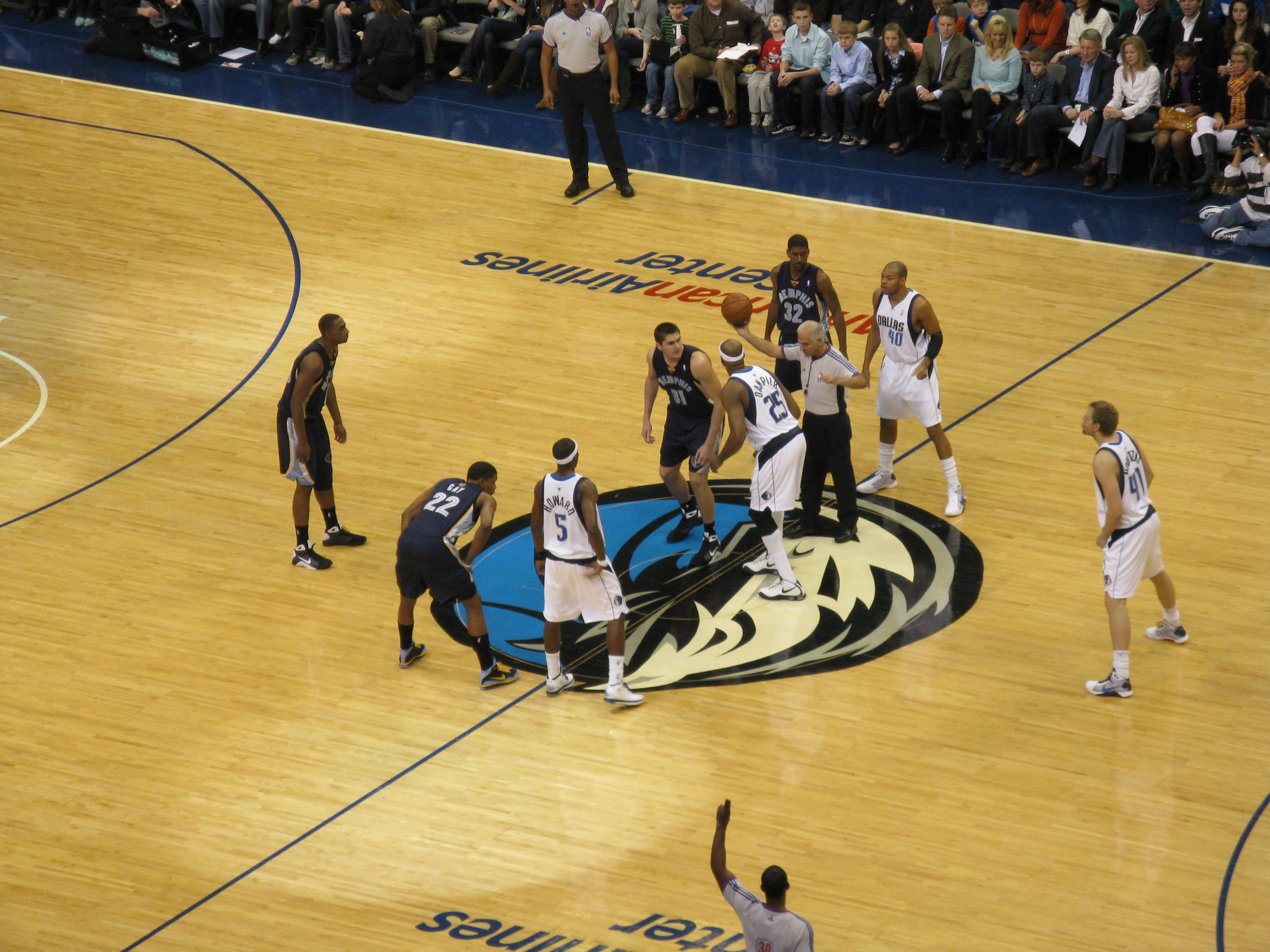
Memphis Grizzlies vs. Dallas Mavericks on December 23, 2008

The 2008–09 Memphis Grizzlies season was the 14th season of the franchise in the National Basketball Association (NBA). The Memphis Grizzlies finished 2 games ahead of their 2007–08 output, and finished 11th in the Western Conference as opposed to 14th.

== Key dates ==
- June 26: The 2008 NBA draft took place in New York City.
- July 1: The free agency period started.

== Draft picks ==
Round	Pick	Player	Position	Nationality	College
1	5	Kevin Love	Forward-center	American	UCLA
1	28	Donté Greene	Small Forward	American	Syracuse

Some hours after the completion of the draft, Memphis sent the rights to #5 overall pick Kevin Love to Minnesota as part of a trade that landed #3 pick O. J. Mayo.

== Roster ==
Memphis Grizzlies roster
Players

Pos.	No.	Player	Height	Weight	DOB	From
F	00	Darrell Arthur	6 ft 9 in (2.06 m)	235 lb (107 kg)		Kansas
G/F	7	Greg Buckner	6 ft 4 in (1.93 m)	210 lb (95 kg)		Clemson
G	11	Mike Conley Jr.	6 ft 1 in (1.85 m)	185 lb (84 kg)		Ohio State
C	33	Marc Gasol	7 ft 1 in (2.16 m)	265 lb (120 kg)		Spain
F	22	Rudy Gay	6 ft 8 in (2.03 m)	230 lb (104 kg)		Connecticut
C	15	Hamed Haddadi	7 ft 2 in (2.18 m)	265 lb (120 kg)		Iran
G/F	55	Marko Jarić	6 ft 7 in (2.01 m)	198 lb (90 kg)		Serbia
G	32	O. J. Mayo	6 ft 4 in (1.93 m)	210 lb (95 kg)		USC
F/C	4	Chris Mihm (injured) (IN)	7 ft 0 in (2.13 m)	265 lb (120 kg)		Texas
F	3	Darius Miles	6 ft 9 in (2.06 m)	210 lb (95 kg)		East St. Louis HS (IL)
F/C	31	Darko Miličić	7 ft 0 in (2.13 m)	250 lb (113 kg)		Serbia
G/F	13	Quinton Ross	6 ft 6 in (1.98 m)	195 lb (88 kg)		SMU
F/C	21	Hakim Warrick	6 ft 9 in (2.06 m)	219 lb (99 kg)		Syracuse
G	29	Mike Wilks (injured) (IN)	5 ft 10 in (1.78 m)	185 lb (84 kg)		Rice

Coaches
Head coach
- Lionel Hollins
Assistant(s)
- Johnny Davis
- Henry Bibby
- Dave Joerger
- Barry Hecker
- Damon Stoudamire

Legend
- (DP) Unsigned draft pick
- (FA) Free agent
- (S) Suspended
- Injured

== Regular season ==
=== Standings ===
Southwest Division	W	L	PCT	GB	Home	Road	Div
y-San Antonio Spurs	54	28	.659	—	28–13	26–15	10–6
x-Houston Rockets	53	29	.646	1	33–8	20–21	9–7
x-Dallas Mavericks	50	32	.610	4	32–9	18–23	7–9
x-New Orleans Hornets	49	33	.598	5	28–13	21–20	9–7
Memphis Grizzlies	24	58	.284	30	16–25	8–33	5–11

#	Western Conference				
#	Team	W	L	PCT	GB
1	c-Los Angeles Lakers	65	17	.793	—
2	y-Denver Nuggets	54	28	.659	11
3	y-San Antonio Spurs	54	28	.659	11
4	x-Portland Trail Blazers	54	28	.659	11
5	x-Houston Rockets	53	29	.646	12
6	x-Dallas Mavericks	50	32	.610	15
7	x-New Orleans Hornets	49	33	.598	16
8	x-Utah Jazz	48	34	.585	17
9	Phoenix Suns	46	36	.561	19
10	Golden State Warriors	29	53	.354	36
11	Memphis Grizzlies	24	58	.293	41
12	Minnesota Timberwolves	24	58	.293	41
13	Oklahoma City Thunder	23	59	.280	42
14	Los Angeles Clippers	19	63	.232	46
15	Sacramento Kings	17	65	.207	48

=== Game log ===
2008–09 game log
October: 1–1 (home: 1–0; road: 0–1)

Game	Date	Team	Score	High points	High rebounds	High assists	Location Attendance	Record
1	October 29	@ Houston	L 71–82	Rudy Gay (20)	Darrell Arthur (15)	Mike Conley Jr., Kyle Lowry (3)	Toyota Center; 18,196	0–1
2	October 31	Orlando	W 86–84	Rudy Gay (29)	Darrell Arthur (10)	Kyle Lowry (4)	FedExForum; 16,139	1–1

November: 3–12 (home: 2–5; road: 1–7)

Game	Date	Team	Score	High points	High rebounds	High assists	Location Attendance	Record
3	November 1	@ Chicago	L 86–96	Rudy Gay (20)	Darko Miličić (9)	Kyle Lowry (4)	United Center; 21,785	1–2
4	November 3	Golden State	W 90–79	Marc Gasol (27)	Marc Gasol (16)	Mike Conley Jr. (7)	FedExForum; 10,121	2–2
5	November 5	@ Sacramento	L 95–100	O. J. Mayo (28)	Rudy Gay, Kyle Lowry, Marc Gasol (6)	Kyle Lowry (7)	ARCO Arena; 13,685	2–3
6	November 7	@ Golden State	W 109–104	Rudy Gay (23)	Darrell Arthur (12)	Mike Conley Jr. (6)	Oracle Arena; 18,744	3–3
7	November 9	@ Denver	L 90–100	O. J. Mayo (31)	Marc Gasol, O. J. Mayo (8)	Mike Conley Jr., Rudy Gay (4)	Pepsi Center; 14,359	3–4
8	November 10	@ Phoenix	L 102–107	O. J. Mayo (33)	Rudy Gay, Darrell Arthur (7)	O. J. Mayo (5)	US Airways Center; 18,422	3–5
9	November 12	New York	L 103–132	Rudy Gay (20)	Hakim Warrick (8)	Marko Jarić, Kyle Lowry (4)	FedExForum; 10,129	3–6
10	November 14	Milwaukee	L 96–101 (OT)	O. J. Mayo (25)	Hakim Warrick (10)	Mike Conley Jr., Kyle Lowry (4)	FedExForum; 11,308	3–7
11	November 18	Sacramento	W 109–94	Rudy Gay (22)	Hakim Warrick (10)	Mike Conley Jr. (7)	FedExForum; 10,834	4–7
12	November 21	@ Dallas	L 76–91	O. J. Mayo (19)	Rudy Gay, Marc Gasol (8)	Rudy Gay (5)	American Airlines Center; 20,035	4–8
13	November 22	Utah	L 94–103	O. J. Mayo (23)	Darrell Arthur (9)	Mike Conley Jr. (8)	FedExForum; 13,121	4–9
14	November 24	San Antonio	L 81–94	O. J. Mayo (26)	Darko Miličić (11)	O. J. Mayo, Kyle Lowry (3)	FedExForum; 12,053	4–10
15	November 26	@ Utah	L 100–117	Rudy Gay (27)	Marc Gasol (8)	Kyle Lowry (5)	EnergySolutions Arena; 19,911	4–11
16	November 28	@ San Antonio	L 98–109	O. J. Mayo (32)	Rudy Gay, Marc Gasol, Darko Miličić (6)	O. J. Mayo, Mike Conley Jr. (4)	AT&T Center; 17,074	4–12
17	November 29	Oklahoma City	L 103–111	O. J. Mayo (30)	O. J. Mayo (7)	Mike Conley Jr. (6)	FedExForum; 11,977	4–13

December: 6–9 (home: 5–4; road: 1–5)

Game	Date	Team	Score	High points	High rebounds	High assists	Location Attendance	Record
18	December 3	@ Atlanta	L 95–105	Hakim Warrick (20)	Rudy Gay (10)	Mike Conley Jr., Kyle Lowry (4)	Philips Arena; 12,088	4–14
19	December 5	L.A. Clippers	W 93–81	Rudy Gay (25)	Darko Miličić (9)	Kyle Lowry (5)	FedExForum; 10,484	5–14
20	December 6	@ New Orleans	L 87–106	Marc Gasol (21)	Marc Gasol (7)	O. J. Mayo (5)	New Orleans Arena; 16,822	5–15
21	December 8	Houston	W 109–97	Rudy Gay (20)	Hakim Warrick, Marc Gasol (8)	Kyle Lowry (5)	FedExForum; 10,691	6–15
22	December 10	@ Oklahoma City	W 108–102	Rudy Gay (22)	Rudy Gay, Hakim Warrick, Marc Gasol (6)	O. J. Mayo, Kyle Lowry (5)	Ford Center; 18,009	7–15
23	December 12	Chicago	W 103–96	Rudy Gay (29)	Darko Miličić (11)	Mike Conley Jr. (7)	FedExForum; 17,132	8–15
24	December 14	Miami	W 102–86	O. J. Mayo (28)	Marc Gasol (7)	Kyle Lowry (5)	FedExForum; 12,271	9–15
25	December 16	New Orleans	L 84–91	Rudy Gay (28)	Marc Gasol (11)	O. J. Mayo, Mike Conley Jr. (4)	FedExForum; 10,231	9–16
26	December 19	Charlotte	L 83–112	Rudy Gay (17)	Marc Gasol (6)	O. J. Mayo (4)	FedExForum; 11,869	9–17
27	December 22	L.A. Lakers	L 96–105	Rudy Gay (23)	Darko Miličić (8)	Kyle Lowry (7)	FedExForum; 17,456	9–18
28	December 23	@ Dallas	L 82–100	Hakim Warrick (17)	Rudy Gay (9)	Kyle Lowry (4)	American Airlines Center; 20,200	9–19
29	December 26	Indiana	W 108–105	Hakim Warrick (21)	O. J. Mayo (8)	O. J. Mayo (7)	FedExForum; 12,346	10–19
30	December 27	@ San Antonio	L 103–106 (2OT)	O. J. Mayo (29)	Rudy Gay (11)	Kyle Lowry (8)	AT&T Center; 18,797	10–20
31	December 29	@ Minnesota	L 98–108 (OT)	O. J. Mayo (23)	Hakim Warrick (8)	Kyle Lowry (12)	Target Center; 12,207	10–21
32	December 30	Phoenix	L 89–101	Hakim Warrick (25)	Marc Gasol (13)	Kyle Lowry (6)	FedExForum; 14,471	10–22

January: 1–13 (home: 1–8; road: 0–5)

Game	Date	Team	Score	High points	High rebounds	High assists	Location Attendance	Record
33	January 2	San Antonio	L 80–91	Hakim Warrick (16)	Marc Gasol (11)	Kyle Lowry, Rudy Gay (3)	FedExForum; 12,597	10–23
34	January 4	Dallas	W 102–82	O. J. Mayo (21)	Hakim Warrick, Rudy Gay (7)	Kyle Lowry (5)	FedExForum; 11,731	11–23
35	January 6	Minnesota	L 87–94	Hakim Warrick (22)	O. J. Mayo (8)	O. J. Mayo, Kyle Lowry (5)	FedExForum; 10,156	11–24
36	January 7	@ New Jersey	L 89–100	O. J. Mayo (26)	Marc Gasol (10)	O. J. Mayo, Rudy Gay, Kyle Lowry, Greg Buckner (3)	Izod Center; 11,552	11–25
37	January 9	@ Toronto	L 82–103	Rudy Gay (22)	Darrell Arthur (7)	Marc Gasol, Mike Conley Jr. (4)	Air Canada Centre; 18,486	11–26
38	January 13	Cleveland	L 87–102	Kyle Lowry (25)	Marc Gasol (11)	Kyle Lowry (7)	FedExForum; 15,121	11–27
39	January 16	Utah	L 91–101	O. J. Mayo (23)	Marc Gasol (10)	Marc Gasol (3)	FedExForum; 10,422	11–28
40	January 19	Detroit	L 79–87	Rudy Gay, O. J. Mayo (15)	Marc Gasol (13)	Mike Conley Jr. (5)	FedExForum; 17,483	11–29
41	January 21	@ Charlotte	L 86–101	Rudy Gay (26)	Marc Gasol (6)	Mike Conley Jr. (5)	Time Warner Cable Arena; 11,249	11–30
42	January 23	@ New York	L 88–108	Rudy Gay (20)	Rudy Gay (9)	Mike Conley Jr. (4)	Madison Square Garden; 18,391	11–31
43	January 24	New Jersey	L 88–99	O. J. Mayo (23)	Marc Gasol (10)	Rudy Gay (4)	FedExForum; 12,817	11–32
44	January 27	Denver	L 85–100	O. J. Mayo (19)	Hakim Warrick (10)	Kyle Lowry, Mike Conley Jr. (4)	FedExForum; 11,338	11–33
45	January 28	@ Oklahoma City	L 102–114 (OT)	Rudy Gay (25)	Rudy Gay, Darrell Arthur (8)	Mike Conley Jr. (9)	Ford Center; 18,450	11–34
46	January 31	L.A. Lakers	L 98–115	Rudy Gay (23)	Hakim Warrick, Darrell Arthur (7)	Mike Conley Jr. (7)	FedExForum; 18,119	11–35

February: 4–8 (home: 3–3; road: 1–5)

Game	Date	Team	Score	High points	High rebounds	High assists	Location Attendance	Record
47	February 2	@ Washington	W 113–97	O. J. Mayo (33)	Marc Gasol (11)	Mike Conley Jr. (5)	Verizon Center; 11,442	12–35
48	February 4	Houston	W 104–93	O. J. Mayo (32)	Rudy Gay, Mike Conley Jr. (9)	Mike Conley Jr. (7)	FedExForum; 10,109	13–35
49	February 6	L.A. Clippers	L 105–126	Rudy Gay (26)	Rudy Gay, O. J. Mayo, Marc Gasol (5)	Mike Conley Jr. (3)	FedExForum; 10,912	13–36
50	February 7	Toronto	W 78–70	O. J. Mayo, Hakim Warrick (16)	O. J. Mayo, Marc Gasol, Greg Buckner, Hakim Warrick, Darko Miličić (8)	Mike Conley Jr. (8)	FedExForum; 11,498	14–36
51	February 9	New Orleans	W 85–80	O. J. Mayo (22)	O. J. Mayo (16)	Mike Conley Jr. (8)	FedExForum; 10,896	15–36
52	February 11	@ Philadelphia	L 87–91	Hakim Warrick (31)	Marc Gasol (9)	O. J. Mayo (5)	Wachovia Center; 12,812	15–37
53	February 17	@ Utah	L 99–117	O. J. Mayo, Rudy Gay (18)	Darko Miličić (10)	Mike Conley Jr. (4)	EnergySolutions Arena; 19,911	15–38
54	February 18	@ Portland	L 90–94	Rudy Gay (20)	Marc Gasol (10)	Mike Conley Jr. (10)	Rose Garden; 20,385	15–39
55	February 20	Sacramento	L 106–115	O. J. Mayo (24)	Rudy Gay, Mike Conley Jr. (10)	Mike Conley Jr. (7)	FedExForum; 15,036	15–40
56	February 24	@ Cleveland	L 79–94	Hakim Warrick, Rudy Gay (13)	Marc Gasol (9)	Mike Conley Jr. (7)	Quicken Loans Arena; 20,562	15–41
57	February 25	@ Indiana	L 99–104	Marc Gasol (22)	Marc Gasol (15)	Mike Conley Jr. (8)	Conseco Fieldhouse; 13,211	15–42
58	February 28	Oklahoma City	L 92–99	Rudy Gay (20)	Marc Gasol (9)	Mike Conley Jr. (4)	FedExForum; 10,074	15–43

March: 4–11 (home: 0–4; road: 4–7)

Game	Date	Team	Score	High points	High rebounds	High assists	Location Attendance	Record
59	March 3	@ L.A. Lakers	L 89–99	Marc Gasol, O. J. Mayo (17)	Marc Gasol (14)	Rudy Gay, Mike Conley Jr. (6)	Staples Center; 18,997	15–44
60	March 4	@ L.A. Clippers	W 118–95	Rudy Gay (35)	Rudy Gay, Marc Gasol (8)	Marc Gasol (10)	Staples Center; 13,813	16–44
61	March 7	Philadelphia	L 105–110	Mike Conley Jr. (31)	Marc Gasol (13)	Mike Conley Jr. (9)	FedExForum; 14,458	16–45
62	March 8	@ Houston	L 83–93	Rudy Gay (21)	Darrell Arthur (12)	Mike Conley Jr. (7)	Toyota Center; 16,179	16–46
63	March 11	@ Minnesota	L 79–104	O. J. Mayo (18)	Darko Miličić (10)	O. J. Mayo, Mike Conley Jr. (5)	Target Center; 12,443	16–47
64	March 13	@ Boston	L 92–102	Rudy Gay (26)	Marc Gasol (15)	Mike Conley Jr. (9)	TD Banknorth Garden; 18,624	16–48
65	March 15	@ Detroit	W 89–84	Mike Conley Jr. (20)	Darko Miličić (11)	Marc Gasol (4)	The Palace of Auburn Hills; 22,076	17–48
66	March 16	Portland	L 92–103	O. J. Mayo (21)	Rudy Gay (11)	O. J. Mayo (6)	FedExForum; 11,417	17–49
67	March 18	Denver	L 109–111	Rudy Gay (30)	Marc Gasol (8)	Mike Conley Jr. (10)	FedExForum; 11,087	17–50
68	March 20	@ New Orleans	L 84–96	Rudy Gay (23)	Marc Gasol, Darko Miličić (6)	O. J. Mayo (4)	New Orleans Arena; 17,837	17–51
69	March 21	Boston	L 87–105	Hakim Warrick (20)	Greg Buckner (7)	Rudy Gay, Mike Conley Jr. (3)	FedExForum; 18,119	17–52
70	March 23	@ Miami	L 82–94	O. J. Mayo (21)	Marc Gasol (9)	Mike Conley Jr. (5)	American Airlines Arena; 18,654	17–53
71	March 27	@ Sacramento	W 113–95	Marc Gasol (27)	Rudy Gay (9)	Mike Conley Jr. (5)	ARCO Arena; 12,987	18–53
72	March 28	@ Portland	L 66–86	O. J. Mayo (12)	Hamed Haddadi, Mike Conley Jr. (6)	O. J. Mayo (5)	Rose Garden; 20,680	18–54
73	March 30	@ Golden State	W 114–109	O. J. Mayo (24)	Hamed Haddadi (8)	O. J. Mayo (10)	Oracle Arena; 18,471	19–54

April: 5–4 (home: 4–1; road: 1–3)

Game	Date	Team	Score	High points	High rebounds	High assists	Location Attendance	Record
74	April 1	Washington	W 112–107	Rudy Gay (25)	Marc Gasol (9)	O. J. Mayo (7)	FedExForum; 10,013	20–54
75	April 3	Dallas	W 107–102	Rudy Gay (27)	Rudy Gay (10)	Mike Conley Jr. (5)	FedExForum; 15,126	21–54
76	April 4	@ Milwaukee	W 107–102	Rudy Gay (26)	Marc Gasol (10)	Mike Conley Jr. (9)	Bradley Center; 18,717	22–54
77	April 7	Portland	L 93–96	O. J. Mayo (31)	Darrell Arthur (5)	Mike Conley Jr. (8)	FedExForum; 10,089	22–55
78	April 8	@ Orlando	L 78–81	Rudy Gay (18)	Marc Gasol (8)	O. J. Mayo, Darrell Arthur (2)	Amway Arena; 17,461	22–56
79	April 10	Phoenix	W 106–89	O. J. Mayo, Rudy Gay (20)	Darrell Arthur, Hakim Warrick (10)	O. J. Mayo, Mike Conley Jr. (6)	FedExForum; 15,908	23–56
80	April 12	@ L.A. Lakers	L 75–92	O. J. Mayo (20)	Marc Gasol (8)	Marc Gasol, Mike Conley Jr. (4)	Staples Center; 18,997	23–57
81	April 13	@ Phoenix	L 110–119	Hakim Warrick, Rudy Gay (26)	Hakim Warrick (9)	Mike Conley Jr. (6)	US Airways Center; 18,422	23–58
82	April 15	Atlanta	W 98–90	O. J. Mayo (26)	Darrell Arthur (10)	Mike Conley Jr. (7)	FedExForum; 12,736	24–58

== Awards and records ==
- O. J. Mayo, NBA All-Rookie Team 1st Team
- Marc Gasol, NBA All-Rookie Team 2nd Team

== Player statistics ==
=== Ragular season ===
Player	POS	GP	GS	MP	REB	AST	STL	BLK	PTS	MPG	RPG	APG	SPG	BPG	PPG
O. J. Mayo	SG	82	82	3,120	308	262	91	13	1,516	38.0	3.8	3.2	1.1	.2	18.5
Marc Gasol	C	82	75	2,521	605	143	63	90	975	30.7	7.4	1.7	.8	1.1	11.9
Mike Conley Jr.	PG	82	61	2,508	276	354	90	8	895	30.6	3.4	4.3	1.1	.1	10.9
Hakim Warrick	PF	82	7	2,029	406	66	48	39	951	24.7	5.0	.8	.6	.5	11.6
Rudy Gay	SF	79	78	2,945	437	135	98	59	1,493	37.3	5.5	1.7	1.2	.7	18.9
Darrell Arthur	PF	76	64	1,464	346	43	52	52	422	19.3	4.6	.6	.7	.7	5.6
Quinton Ross	SF	68	7	1,164	126	47	32	14	265	17.1	1.9	.7	.5	.2	3.9
Greg Buckner	SF	63	0	878	130	57	29	8	155	13.9	2.1	.9	.5	.1	2.5
Darko Miličić	C	61	15	1,034	264	34	22	51	333	17.0	4.3	.6	.4	.8	5.5
Marko Jarić	SG	53	0	605	65	74	29	11	136	11.4	1.2	1.4	.5	.2	2.6
Kyle Lowry^{†}	PG	49	21	1,071	111	178	48	8	370	21.9	2.3	3.6	1.0	.2	7.6
Darius Miles	SF	34	0	298	57	17	11	20	120	8.8	1.7	.5	.3	.6	3.5
Hamed Haddadi	C	19	0	120	47	8	1	12	48	6.3	2.5	.4	.1	.6	2.5
Javaris Crittenton^{†}	SG	7	0	44	6	5	1	0	19	6.3	.9	.7	.1	.0	2.7
Adonal Foyle^{†}	C	1	0	3	0	0	0	0	0	3.0	.0	.0	.0	.0	.0

- ^{†} Denotes player spent time with another team in the season. Stats reflect time with the Grizzlies only.

== Transactions ==
=== Free agents ===
==== Additions ====
Player	Signed	Former team

==== Subtractions ====
Player	Left	New team
