= 2009–10 Denver Nuggets season =

NBA professional basketball team season

- Division champions
- Head coach: George Karl
- General manager: Mark Warkentien
- Owner: Stan Kroenke
- Arena: Pepsi Center

Results
- Record: 53–29 (.646)
- Place: Division: 1st (Northwest); Conference: 4th (Western)
- Playoff finish: First Round (lost to Jazz 2–4)
- Stats at Basketball Reference

Local media
- Television: Altitude Sports and Entertainment
- Radio: KCKK

The 2009–10 Denver Nuggets season was the 43rd season of the franchise, its 34th in the National Basketball Association (NBA). After their trip the conference finals last season, the Nuggets started the season 35–18 before the All-Star break. Carmelo Anthony and Chauncey Billups were selected to the 2010 NBA All-Star Game with George Karl coaching the Western Conference. Karl was diagnosed with neck and throat cancer, ending his season. Adrian Dantley took over and the team struggled in the second half of the season, finishing with a 53–29 record and earned the number 4 seed in the West. Denver's season ended in the first round with a defeat to the Utah Jazz in six games. The Nuggets had the third best team offensive rating in the NBA.

== Key dates ==
- June 25 – The 2009 NBA draft took place in New York City.
- July 8 – The free agency period started.

== Free Agency ==
On July 8, the Nuggets re-signed fan favorite Chris "Birdman" Andersen to a 5-year, $21.17 million contract, worth up to $26 million with incentives. However, on July 13, the Nuggets lost starting shooting guard Dahntay Jones, who signed a 4-year, $10.6 million contract with the Indiana Pacers. The Nuggets also lost reserve forward Linas Kleiza to Greek team Olympiacos Piraeus on August 10, when he signed a 2-year, $12.2 million contract. On August 16, backup point guard Anthony Carter was re-signed to a 1-year minimum-salary contract worth $1,306,455. On August 27, the team re-signed reserve center Johan Petro to a 1-year minimum-salary contract worth $884,881. On September 25, the Nuggets signed forward Joey Graham to a 1-year, non-guaranteed, minimum salary contract worth $884,881. On September 28, reserve point guard Jason Hart signed a 1-year non-guaranteed minimum-salary contract with the Minnesota Timberwolves. On September 26, the team also signed forward Keith Brumbaugh, point guard Dontaye Draper, and center Kurt Looby to non-guaranteed contracts for training camp. Brumbaugh was waived on October 10. Draper and Looby were waived on October 21.

== Trades ==
The Nuggets made two draft-day trades as well as several others later in the offseason. On draft day, the Nuggets acquired the draft rights to point guard Ty Lawson, the 18th overall pick, from Minnesota in exchange for Charlotte's 2010 1st-round pick, which they had previously acquired. The Nuggets also traded the draft rights to point guard Sergio Llull, a second-round pick (34th overall), to the Houston Rockets in exchange for $2.25 million cash. On July 13, the Nuggets acquired shooting guard Arron Afflalo, forward Walter Sharpe, and $350,000 cash from the Detroit Pistons in exchange for a 2011 2nd-round pick. The pick will be the lower of the Nuggets' and Blazers' selections, which the Nuggets previously acquired. On July 31, the Nuggets acquired power forward Malik Allen from the Milwaukee Bucks in exchange for swingman Sonny Weems, Sharpe, and cash considerations. On August 10, the Nuggets traded F/C Steven Hunter, their 2010 1st-round pick, and $3 million cash to the Memphis Grizzlies for a 2014 conditional 2nd-round pick. On September 22, the Nuggets acquired swingman James White from Houston in exchange for the draft rights to forward Axel Hervelle, a 2005 2nd-round pick (52nd overall). White was waived on October 21.

== Draft ==
Round	Pick	Player	Position	Nationality	College
1	18	Ty Lawson^{*}	Point guard	United States	UNC
2	34	Sergio Llull^{x}	Point guard	Spain	Real Madrid (Spain)

^{*} Acquired from Minnesota. ^{x} Traded to Houston.

== Roster ==
2009–10 Denver Nuggets roster
Players

Pos.	No.	Player	Height	Weight	DOB	From
G	6	Arron Afflalo	6 ft 5 in (1.96 m)	215 lb (98 kg)		UCLA
F	30	Malik Allen	6 ft 10 in (2.08 m)	255 lb (116 kg)	1978–06–27	Villanova
F/C	11	Chris Andersen	6 ft 10 in (2.08 m)	228 lb (103 kg)	1978–07–07	Blinn
SF	15	Carmelo Anthony	6 ft 8 in (2.03 m)	230 lb (104 kg)	1984–05–29	Syracuse
F	32	Renaldo Balkman (IN)	6 ft 8 in (2.03 m)	208 lb (94 kg)	1984–07–14	South Carolina
G	7	Chauncey Billups	6 ft 3 in (1.91 m)	202 lb (92 kg)	1976–09–25	Colorado
C	43	Brian Butch (IN)	6 ft 11 in (2.11 m)	240 lb (109 kg)	1984–12–22	Wisconsin
PG	25	Anthony Carter	6 ft 1 in (1.85 m)	190 lb (86 kg)	1975–06–16	Hawaiʻi
G/F	14	Joey Graham	6 ft 7 in (2.01 m)	225 lb (102 kg)	1982–06–11	Oklahoma State
G	22	Coby Karl (IN)	6 ft 5 in (1.96 m)	215 lb (98 kg)	1983–06–08	Boise State
G	3	Ty Lawson	5 ft 11 in (1.80 m)	195 lb (88 kg)	1987–11–03	North Carolina
PF	4	Kenyon Martin	6 ft 9 in (2.06 m)	240 lb (109 kg)	1977–12–30	Cincinnati
F/C	31	Nenê	6 ft 11 in (2.11 m)	250 lb (113 kg)	1982–09–13	Brazil
C	27	Johan Petro	7 ft 0 in (2.13 m)	247 lb (112 kg)	1986–01–27	France
G/F	1	J. R. Smith	6 ft 6 in (1.98 m)	220 lb (100 kg)	1985–09–09	St. Benedict's Prep (NJ)

Coaches
Head coach
- (United States) George Karl (North Carolina)
Assistant(s)
- (United States) Adrian Dantley (Notre Dame)
- (United States) John Welch (UNLV)
- (United States) Tim Grgurich (Pittsburgh)
- (United States) Jamahl Mosley (Colorado)

Legend
- (DP) Unsigned draft pick
- (FA) Free agent
- (S) Suspended
- Injured

== Pre-season ==
2009 Pre-season game log: 4–4 (home: 2–1; road: 2–3)
#	Date	Visitor	Score	Home	OT	Attendance	Record
1	October 1	Denver Nuggets	87 – 103	Utah Jazz		18,114	0–1
2	October 3	Partizan Belgrade (Serbia)	70 – 102	Denver Nuggets		9,749	1-1
3	October 8 (in Taipei)	Indiana Pacers	126–104	Denver Nuggets		13,599	1–2
4	October 11 (in Beijing, China)	Denver Nuggets	128–112	Indiana Pacers		16,982	2-2
5	October 18	Denver Nuggets	96 – 98	Portland Trail Blazers		18,943	2–3
6	October 20	Minnesota Timberwolves	100–129	Denver Nuggets		11,228	3-3
7	October 22 (in Anaheim, California)	Denver Nuggets	89 – 106	Los Angeles Lakers		15,206	3–4
8	October 23 (in San Diego)	Denver Nuggets	119–105	Los Angeles Lakers		13,586	4-4

== Regular season ==
=== Standings ===
Northwest Division	W	L	PCT	GB	Home	Road	Div
y-Denver Nuggets	53	29	.646	–	34–7	19–22	12–4
x-Utah Jazz	53	29	.646	–	32–9	21–20	8–8
x-Portland Trail Blazers	50	32	.610	3	26–15	24–17	8–8
x-Oklahoma City Thunder	50	32	.610	3	27–14	23–18	9–7
Minnesota Timberwolves	15	67	.183	38	10–31	5–36	3–13

#	Western Conference				
#	Team	W	L	PCT	GB
1	c-Los Angeles Lakers	57	25	.695	–
2	y-Dallas Mavericks	55	27	.671	2
3	x-Phoenix Suns	54	28	.659	3
4	y-Denver Nuggets	53	29	.646	4
5	x-Utah Jazz	53	29	.646	4
6	x-Portland Trail Blazers	50	32	.610	7
7	x-San Antonio Spurs	50	32	.610	7
8	x-Oklahoma City Thunder	50	32	.610	7
9	Houston Rockets	42	40	.512	15
10	Memphis Grizzlies	40	42	.488	17
11	New Orleans Hornets	37	45	.451	20
12	Los Angeles Clippers	29	53	.354	28
13	Golden State Warriors	26	56	.317	31
14	Sacramento Kings	25	57	.305	32
15	Minnesota Timberwolves	15	67	.183	42

=== Game log ===
2009–10 game log
October: 2–0 (home: 1–0; road: 1–0)

Game	Date	Team	Score	High points	High rebounds	High assists	Location Attendance	Record
1	October 28	Jazz	W 114–105	Carmelo Anthony (30)	Kenyon Martin (11)	Ty Lawson (6)	Pepsi Center; 19,155	1–0
2	October 29	@ Trail Blazers	W 97–94	Carmelo Anthony (41)	Nenê (11)	Chauncey Billups (6)	Rose Garden Arena; 20,218	2–0

November: 10–5 (home: 6–1; road: 4–4)

Game	Date	Team	Score	High points	High rebounds	High assists	Location Attendance	Record
3	November 1	Grizzlies	W 133–123	Carmelo Anthony (42)	Nenê (9)	Chauncey Billups (12)	Pepsi Center; 15,823	3–0
4	November 3	@ Pacers	W 111–93	Carmelo Anthony (25)	Nenê (13)	Anthony Carter (5)	Conseco Fieldhouse; 10,627	4–0
5	November 4	@ Nets	W 122–94	Ty Lawson (23)	Kenyon Martin (10)	Chauncey Billups (5)	Izod Center; 15,319	5–0
6	November 6	@ Heat	L 88–96	Carmelo Anthony (30)	Carmelo Anthony, Nenê (8)	Chauncey Billups, Carmelo Anthony, Ty Lawson, Arron Afflalo (2)	AmericanAirlines Arena; 19,600	5–1
7	November 7	@ Hawks	L 100–125	Carmelo Anthony (30)	Chris Andersen (11)	Chauncey Billups (7)	Philips Arena; 17,801	5–2
8	November 10	@ Bulls	W 90–89	Carmelo Anthony (20)	Nenê (12)	Chauncey Billups (6)	United Center; 21,409	6–2
9	November 11	@ Bucks	L 102–108	Carmelo Anthony (32)	Carmelo Anthony (10)	Chauncey Billups, Ty Lawson (5)	Bradley Center; 12,987	6–3
10	November 13	Lakers	W 105–79	Carmelo Anthony (25)	Chris Andersen (11)	Chauncey Billups (8)	Pepsi Center; 19,141	7–3
11	November 17	Raptors	W 130–112	Carmelo Anthony (32)	Nenê (10)	Chauncey Billups (10)	Pepsi Center; 16,446	8–3
12	November 20	@ Clippers	L 99–106	Carmelo Anthony (37)	Nenê (12)	Chauncey Billups (7)	Staples Center; 18,155	8–4
13	November 21	Bulls	W 112–93	Carmelo Anthony (30)	Carmelo Anthony, Kenyon Martin (11)	Carmelo Anthony (7)	Pepsi Center; 19,359	9–4
14	November 24	Nets	W 101–87	Carmelo Anthony (27)	Nenê (9)	Chauncey Billups (7)	Pepsi Center; 16,307	10–4
15	November 25	@ Timberwolves	W 124–111	Carmelo Anthony (22)	Nenê (8)	Nenê, Ty Lawson (6)	Target Center; 13,101	11–4
16	November 27	Knicks	W 128–125	Carmelo Anthony (50)	Nenê, Kenyon Martin (11)	Chauncey Billups (8)	Pepsi Center; 19,155	12–4
17	November 29	Timberwolves	L 100–106	Carmelo Anthony (32)	Kenyon Martin (14)	Nenê (5)	Pepsi Center; 15,147	12–5

December: 8–7 (home: 6–1; road: 2–6)

Game	Date	Team	Score	High points	High rebounds	High assists	Location Attendance	Record
18	December 1	Warriors	W 135–107	Carmelo Anthony (25)	Nenê (12)	Chauncey Billups (8)	Pepsi Center; 14,570	13–5
19	December 3	Heat	W 114–96	Carmelo Anthony (22)	Chris Andersen (10)	Chauncey Billups (7)	Pepsi Center; 14,998	14–5
20	December 5	@ Spurs	W 106–99	Carmelo Anthony (34)	Kenyon Martin (13)	Chauncey Billups (5)	AT&T Center; 17,592	15–5
21	December 7	@ 76ers	W 93–83	Chauncey Billups (31)	Chauncey Billups (8)	Chauncey Billups (8)	Wachovia Center; 20,664	16–5
22	December 8	@ Bobcats	L 95–107	Carmelo Anthony (34)	Nenê (10)	J.R. Smith (4)	Time Warner Cable Arena; 14,127	16–6
23	December 10	@ Pistons	L 99–101	Carmelo Anthony (40)	Nenê (11)	Ty Lawson (4)	The Palace of Auburn Hills; 17,176	16–7
24	December 12	Suns	W 105–99	Carmelo Anthony (32)	Chris Andersen (10)	Chauncey Billups (8)	Pepsi Center; 19,155	17–7
25	December 14	Thunder	W 102–93	Carmelo Anthony (31)	Chris Andersen, Kenyon Martin (11)	Chauncey Billups (7)	Pepsi Center; 16,022	18–7
26	December 16	Rockets	W 111–101	Carmelo Anthony (38)	Chris Andersen (11)	Ty Lawson (6)	Pepsi Center; 15,753	19–7
27	December 18	@ Hornets	L 92–98	J.R. Smith (25)	Kenyon Martin (13)	Anthony Carter (5)	New Orleans Arena; 14,453	19–8
28	December 20	@ Grizzlies	L 96–102	Carmelo Anthony (41)	Chris Andersen (14)	Anthony Carter (7)	FedExForum; 13,385	19–9
29	December 23	Hawks	W 124–104	J.R. Smith (41)	Kenyon Martin, Nenê (8)	Carmelo Anthony, Anthony Carter (7)	Pepsi Center; 19,155	20–9
30	December 25	@ Trail Blazers	L 96–107	Carmelo Anthony (32)	Kenyon Martin (14)	Chauncey Billups (5)	Rose Garden Arena; 20,664	20–10
31	December 27	Mavericks	L 96–104	Kenyon Martin (18)	Carmelo Anthony (12)	Arron Afflalo, Carmelo Anthony, Ty Lawson, J.R. Smith (4)	Pepsi Center; 19,756	20–11
32	December 28	@ Kings	L 101–106	Carmelo Anthony (34)	Kenyon Martin (12)	Ty Lawson (6)	ARCO Arena; 14,548	20–12

January: 12–3 (home: 8–1; road: 4–2)

Game	Date	Team	Score	High points	High rebounds	High assists	Location Attendance	Record
33	January 2	@ Jazz	W 105–95	Ty Lawson (23)	Kenyon Martin (12)	Ty Lawson (9)	EnergySolutions Arena; 19,911	21–12
34	January 3	76ers	L 105–108	Nenê (24)	Nenê (15)	Ty Lawson (9)	Pepsi Center; 19,155	21–13
35	January 5	Warriors	W 123–122	Kenyon Martin (27)	Kenyon Martin (13)	Ty Lawson (8)	Pepsi Center; 15,129	22–13
36	January 8	Cavaliers	W 99–97	Chauncey Billups (23)	Kenyon Martin (12)	Chauncey Billups (5)	Pepsi Center; 19,996	23–13
37	January 9	@ Kings	L 100–102	Chauncey Billups (27)	Kenyon Martin (10)	Kenyon Martin (5)	ARCO Arena; 14,411	23–14
38	January 11	Timberwolves	W 105–94	Carmelo Anthony (24)	Kenyon Martin (15)	Chauncey Billups (10)	Pepsi Center; 14,669	24–14
39	January 13	Magic	W 115–97	Carmelo Anthony (27)	Kenyon Martin (10)	Anthony Carter (6)	Pepsi Center; 18,475	25–14
40	January 17	Jazz	W 119–112	Carmelo Anthony (37)	Kenyon Martin (9)	J.R. Smith (5)	Pepsi Center; 19,519	26–14
41	January 20	@ Warriors	W 123–118 OT	Chauncey Billups (37)	Kenyon Martin (14)	Chauncey Billups (8)	Oracle Arena; 17,223	27–14
42	January 21	Clippers	W 105–85	Carmelo Anthony (28)	Kenyon Martin (14)	Chauncey Billups (6)	Pepsi Center; 15,343	28–14
43	January 23	Hornets	W 116–110	Carmelo Anthony (30)	Kenyon Martin (14)	Chauncey Billups (9)	Pepsi Center; 19,807	29–14
44	January 25	Bobcats	W 104–93	Chauncey Billups (27)	Chauncey Billups, J.R. Smith (6)	Chauncey Billups (11)	Pepsi Center; 16,909	30–14
45	January 27	@ Rockets	W 97–92	J.R. Smith (22)	Kenyon Martin (15)	Chauncey Billups (4)	Toyota Center; 16,357	31–14
46	January 29	@ Thunder	L 84–101	J.R. Smith (19)	Kenyon Martin (9)	Chauncey Billups (7)	Ford Center; 18,203	31–15
47	January 31	@ Spurs	W 103–89	Chauncey Billups (25)	Kenyon Martin (11)	Chauncey Billups (11)	AT&T Center; 17,607	32–15

February: 7–5 (home: 4–2; road: 3–3)

Game	Date	Team	Score	High points	High rebounds	High assists	Location Attendance	Record
48	February 1	Kings	W 112–109	Kenyon Martin (24)	Kenyon Martin (12)	Chauncey Billups (9)	Pepsi Center; 15,544	33–15
49	February 3	Suns	L 97–109	Nenê, J.R. Smith (15)	Kenyon Martin (10)	J.R. Smith (5)	Pepsi Center; 19,155	33–16
50	February 5	@ Lakers	W 126–113	Chauncey Billups (39)	Chris Andersen (15)	Chauncey Billups (8)	Staples Center; 18,997	34–16
51	February 6	@ Jazz	L 106–116	Ty Lawson (25)	Kenyon Martin (13)	Ty Lawson (4)	EnergySolutions Arena; 19,911	34–17
52	February 9	Mavericks	W 127–91	Nenê (21)	Chris Andersen (10)	Ty Lawson (7)	Pepsi Center; 17,485	35–17
53	February 11	Spurs	L 92–111	Nenê (20)	Nenê (9)	Chauncey Billups (7)	Pepsi Center; 18,611	35–18
54	February 18	@ Cavaliers	W 118–116	Carmelo Anthony (40)	Kenyon Martin (17)	Chauncey Billups (8)	Quicken Loans Arena; 20,562	36–18
55	February 19	@ Wizards	L 97–107	Chauncey Billups (28)	Kenyon Martin, Nenê (9)	Ty Lawson (3)	Verizon Center; 17,212	36–19
56	February 21	Celtics	W 114–105	Chauncey Billups (26)	Kenyon Martin, Nenê (10)	Carmelo Anthony (8)	Pepsi Center; 19,818	37–19
57	February 25	@ Warriors	W 127–112	Chauncey Billups (37)	Chris Andersen (11)	Chauncey Billups (9)	Oracle Arena; 18,555	38–19
58	February 26	Pistons	W 107–102	Chauncey Billups (25)	Joey Graham (7)	Ty Lawson, Nenê, J.R. Smith (4)	Pepsi Center; 19,845	39–19
59	February 28	@ Lakers	L 89–95	Carmelo Anthony (21)	Nenê (11)	Chauncey Billups (4)	Staples Center; 18,997	39–20

March: 9–7 (home: 5–1; road: 4–6)

Game	Date	Team	Score	High points	High rebounds	High assists	Location Attendance	Record
60	March 1	@ Suns	L 85–101	Chauncey Billups (21)	Kenyon Martin (10)	Carmelo Anthony, Chauncey Billups (4)	US Airways Center; 18,159	39–21
61	March 3	Thunder	W 119–90	Carmelo Anthony (30)	Kenyon Martin (13)	Anthony Carter (12)	Pepsi Center; 18,822	40–21
62	March 5	Pacers	W 122–114	Carmelo Anthony (34)	Chris Andersen (10)	J.R. Smith (8)	Pepsi Center; 19,155	41–21
63	March 7	Trail Blazers	W 118–106	Carmelo Anthony (30)	Johan Petro (10)	J.R. Smith (7)	Pepsi Center; 17,266	42–21
64	March 10	@ Timberwolves	W 110–102	Chauncey Billups (25)	Chris Andersen (10)	Anthony Carter (8)	Target Center; 14,256	43–21
65	March 12	@ Hornets	W 102–95	Carmelo Anthony (32)	Carmelo Anthony, Nenê (12)	Chauncey Billups (7)	New Orleans Arena; 17,220	44–21
66	March 13	@ Grizzlies	W 125–108	J.R. Smith (30)	Carmelo Anthony, Arron Afflalo (6)	Anthony Carter (7)	FedExForum; 17,023	45–21
67	March 15	@ Rockets	L 123–125	Carmelo Anthony (45)	Carmelo Anthony, Nenê, Johan Petro (10)	Nenê (5)	Toyota Center; 16,369	45–22
68	March 16	Wizards	W 97–87	Carmelo Anthony (29)	Carmelo Anthony (12)	Anthony Carter, Nenê (4)	Pepsi Center; 17,447	46–22
69	March 18	Hornets	W 93–80	Carmelo Anthony (26)	Carmelo Anthony (18)	Chauncey Billups (8)	Pepsi Center; 19,155	47–22
70	March 20	Bucks	L 97–102	Carmelo Anthony, Chauncey Billups (29)	Chris Andersen (12)	Anthony Carter (4)	Pepsi Center; 19,390	47–23
71	March 23	@ Knicks	L 104–109	Carmelo Anthony (36)	Chris Andersen, Joey Graham, Nenê (7)	Chauncey Billups (6)	Madison Square Garden; 19,763	47–24
72	March 24	@ Celtics	L 99–113	Carmelo Anthony (32)	Chris Andersen, Chauncey Billups (7)	Chauncey Billups (6)	TD Banknorth Garden; 18,624	47–25
73	March 26	@ Raptors	W 97–96	Carmelo Anthony (25)	Nenê (9)	Nenê (6)	Air Canada Centre; 19,800	48–25
74	March 28	@ Magic	L 97–103	Carmelo Anthony (26)	Carmelo Anthony, Arron Afflalo (8)	Chauncey Billups (5)	Amway Arena; 17,461	48–26
75	March 29	@ Mavericks	L 93–109	J.R. Smith (27)	Carmelo Anthony (9)	Chauncey Billups (6)	American Airlines Center; 20,085	48–27

April: 5–2 (home: 4–1; road: 1–1)

Game	Date	Team	Score	High points	High rebounds	High assists	Location Attendance	Record
76	April 1	Trail Blazers	W 109–92	Carmelo Anthony (25)	Chris Andersen (6)	Chauncey Billups (6)	Pepsi Center; 19,155	49–27
77	April 3	Clippers	W 98–90	Carmelo Anthony (24)	Arron Afflalo (9)	Chauncey Billups (6)	Pepsi Center; 19,155	50–27
78	April 7	@ Thunder	W 98–94	Chauncey Billups (29)	Nenê (13)	Chauncey Billups (4)	Ford Center; 18,332	51–27
79	April 8	Lakers	W 98–96	Carmelo Anthony (31)	Chris Andersen, Nenê, Johan Petro (7)	Chauncey Billups (6)	Pepsi Center; 20,044	52–27
80	April 10	Spurs	L 85–104	Chauncey Billups (27)	Kenyon Martin (10)	Chauncey Billups, Ty Lawson, J.R. Smith (3)	Pepsi Center; 19,155	52–28
81	April 12	Grizzlies	W 123–101	J.R. Smith (26)	Arron Afflalo (13)	Chauncey Billups (7)	Pepsi Center; 19,155	53–28
82	April 13	@ Suns	L 101–123	Carmelo Anthony (29)	Carmelo Anthony (6)	Ty Lawson (5)	US Airways Center; 18,422	53–29

2009–10 season schedule

== Playoffs ==
=== Game log ===
2010 playoff game log
First Round: 2–4 (home: 2–1; road: 0–3)

Game	Date	Team	Score	High points	High rebounds	High assists	Location Attendance	Series
1	April 17	Utah	W 126–113	Carmelo Anthony (42)	Kenyon Martin (12)	Chauncey Billups (8)	Pepsi Center; 19,155	1–0
2	April 19	Utah	L 111–114	Carmelo Anthony (32)	Carmelo Anthony, Nenê, J.R. Smith (6)	Chauncey Billups (11)	Pepsi Center; 19,155	1–1
3	April 23	@ Utah	L 93–105	Carmelo Anthony, Chauncey Billups (25)	Kenyon Martin (13)	Chauncey Billups, Anthony Carter (3)	EnergySolutions Arena; 19,911	1–2
4	April 25	@ Utah	L 106–117	Carmelo Anthony (39)	Carmelo Anthony, Nenê (11)	Chauncey Billups (4)	EnergySolutions Arena; 19,911	1–3
5	April 28	Utah	W 116–102	Carmelo Anthony (26)	Carmelo Anthony (11)	Chauncey Billups, Nenê (4)	Pepsi Center; 19,155	2–3
6	April 30	@ Utah	L 104–112	Chauncey Billups (30)	Carmelo Anthony (12)	Chauncey Billups (8)	EnergySolutions Arena; 19,911	2–4

2010 playoff schedule

== Player statistics ==
Legend
GP	Games played	GS	Games started	MPG	Minutes per game
FG%	Field-goal percentage	3P%	3-point field-goal percentage	FT%	Free-throw percentage
RPG	Rebounds per game	APG	Assists per game	SPG	Steals per game
BPG	Blocks per game	PPG	Points per game

=== Regular season ===
Player	GP	GS	MPG	FG%	3FG%	FT%	RPG	APG	SPG	BPG	PPG
Carmelo Anthony	69	69	38.2	.458	.316	.830	6.6	3.2	1.3	0.4	28.2
Chauncey Billups	73	73	34.1	.418	.386	.910	3.1	5.6	1.1	0.1	19.5
J.R. Smith	75	0	27.8	.414	.338	.706	3.1	2.4	1.3	0.3	15.4
Nenê	82	82	33.6	.587	.000	.704	7.6	2.5	1.4	1.0	13.8
Kenyon Martin	58	58	34.2	.456	.276	.557	9.4	1.9	1.2	1.1	11.5
Arron Afflalo	82	75	27.1	.465	.434	.735	3.1	1.7	0.6	0.4	8.8
Ty Lawson	65	8	20.3	.515	.410	.757	1.9	3.1	0.7	0.0	8.3
Chris Andersen	76	0	22.3	.566	.000	.695	6.4	0.4	0.6	1.9	5.9
Joey Graham	63	18	12.0	.520	.154	.740	2.0	0.3	0.4	0.1	4.2
Johan Petro	36	16	12.1	.535	.000	.667	3.6	0.4	0.3	0.4	3.4
Anthony Carter	54	7	15.9	.420	.270	.846	1.6	3.0	0.7	0.2	3.3
Malik Allen	51	3	8.9	.397	.167	.923	1.6	0.3	0.2	0.1	2.1
Renaldo Balkman	13	1	7.0	.333	.000	.333	1.8	0.5	0.6	0.2	1.1

=== Playoffs ===
Player	GP	GS	MPG	FG%	3P%	FT%	RPG	APG	SPG	BPG	PPG
Arron Afflalo	6	6	20.0	.625	.429	.818	2.0	1.2	.2	.3	9.2
Malik Allen	4	0	2.8	.000	.000	.000	.8	.0	.2	.0	.0
Chris Andersen	6	0	19.3	.529	.000	.643	4.5	.2	.2	1.0	4.5
Carmelo Anthony	6	6	42.3	.464	.316	.877	8.5	3.2	2.0	.5	30.7
Renaldo Balkman	0	0	0	.000	.000	.000	.0	.0	.0	.0	.0
Chauncey Billups	6	6	34.5	.446	.355	.881	2.3	6.3	1.0	.5	20.6
Anthony Carter	1	0	7.0	.000	.000	.000	.0	3.0	.0	.0	.0
Joey Graham	4	0	7.3	.588	.333	.600	2.5	.0	.5	.2	6.0
Ty Lawson	6	6	19.7	.429	.400	.684	1.3	2.7	1.0	.0	7.8
Kenyon Martin	6	6	34.2	.480	.000	.632	8.3	1.3	1.5	1.2	10.0
Nenê	5	5	33.8	.621	.000	.583	5.8	2.2	1.2	.2	11.4
Johan Petro	6	1	7.5	.545	.000	.500	1.8	.2	.2	.5	2.2
J.R. Smith	6	0	26.5	.368	.355	.875	3.8	1.7	.7	.3	11.2

== Awards, records and milestones ==
=== Awards ===
==== Week/Month ====
- Carmelo Anthony was named Western Conference Player of the Week for games played from Tuesday, Oct. 27 through Sunday, Nov. 1.
- Carmelo Anthony was named Western Conference Player of the Month for games played during the month of November.
- Carmelo Anthony was named Western Conference Player of the Week for games played from Monday, Jan. 11 through Sunday, Jan. 17.
- Chauncey Billups was named Western Conference Player of the Week for games played from Monday, Jan. 18 through Sunday, Jan. 24.

==== All-Star ====
- Carmelo Anthony was voted as an NBA Western Conference All-Star starter.
- Chauncey Billups was named to the NBA Western Conference All-Star team as a replacement for Chris Paul. Billups finished in 3rd place in the 3-point contest.

==== Season ====
- Carmelo Anthony was named to the All-NBA Second Team.

== Transactions ==
Denver Nuggets

Players Added

Via Draft

- Sergio Llull

Via Trade

- Ty Lawson (From Timberwolves)
- Arron Afflalo (From Pistons)
- Walter Sharpe (From Pistons)
- Malik Allen (From Bucks)

Via Free Agency

- Chris Andersen (Re-signed)
Players Lost

Via Trade

- Sergio Llull (To Rockets)
- Sonny Weems (To Bucks)
- Walter Sharpe (To Bucks)
- Steven Hunter (To Grizzlies)

Via Free Agency

- Dahntay Jones (To Pacers)
- Linas Kleiza (To Olympiacos Piraeus)
