= 2008–09 Denver Nuggets season =

NBA professional basketball team season

- Division champions
- Head coach: George Karl
- General manager: Mark Warkentien
- Owner: Stan Kroenke
- Arena: Pepsi Center

Results
- Record: 54–28 (.659)
- Place: Division: 1st (Northwest); Conference: 2nd (Western)
- Playoff finish: Conference finals (lost to Lakers 2–4)
- Stats at Basketball Reference

Local media
- Television: Altitude Sports and Entertainment
- Radio: KCKK

The 2008–09 Denver Nuggets season was the 42nd season of the franchise, 33rd in the National Basketball Association (NBA). They finished the regular season with 54 wins and 28 losses, the franchise's best record since 1987–88. In the playoffs, the Nuggets defeated New Orleans Hornets in five games in the first round; this series included a notable 58-point bludgeoning of the Hornets in Game 4. The Nuggets then defeated the Dallas Mavericks in five games in the Western Conference Semi-finals to reach the conference finals for the first time since 1985, ending their streak of five straight first-round exits. However, the Nuggets lost to the eventual NBA champion Los Angeles Lakers, ending their playoff run. This was the second straight year the Nuggets had their season ended by the Lakers.

The Nuggets' six-game loss to the Lakers in the 2009 Western Conference finals matched their six-game defeat in the 1978 Western Conference finals for the closest the franchise had ever come to reaching an NBA Finals until 2023.

== Key dates ==
- June 26: The 2008 NBA draft took place in New York City.
- July 1: The free agency period started.

During the first week of the season, superstar guard Allen Iverson was traded in a blockbuster deal to the Detroit Pistons for Chauncey Billups, Antonio McDyess and Cheikh Samb. McDyess was released soon after the trade.

== Draft picks ==
The Denver Nuggets had no draft picks in the 2008 NBA draft, but did acquire the draft rights of Sonny Weems from the Chicago Bulls. Weems was the 39th pick of the draft.

== Roster ==
2008–09 Denver Nuggets roster
Players

Pos.	No.	Player	Height	Weight	DOB	From
F/C	11	Chris Andersen	6 ft 10 in (2.08 m)	228 lb (103 kg)	1978-07-07	Blinn
SF	15	Carmelo Anthony	6 ft 8 in (2.03 m)	230 lb (104 kg)	1984-05-29	Syracuse
F	32	Renaldo Balkman	6 ft 8 in (2.03 m)	225 lb (102 kg)	1984-07-14	South Carolina
G	7	Chauncey Billups	6 ft 3 in (1.91 m)	202 lb (92 kg)	1976-09-25	Colorado
PG	25	Anthony Carter	6 ft 1 in (1.85 m)	190 lb (86 kg)	1975-06-16	Hawaiʻi
PG	6	Jason Hart	6 ft 3 in (1.91 m)	185 lb (84 kg)	1978-04-29	Syracuse
F/C	45	Steven Hunter	7 ft 0 in (2.13 m)	240 lb (109 kg)	1981-10-31	DePaul
G/F	30	Dahntay Jones	6 ft 6 in (1.98 m)	210 lb (95 kg)	1980-12-27	Duke
F	43	Linas Kleiza	6 ft 8 in (2.03 m)	245 lb (111 kg)	1985-01-03	Missouri
PF	4	Kenyon Martin	6 ft 9 in (2.06 m)	240 lb (109 kg)	1977-12-30	Cincinnati
F/C	31	Nenê	6 ft 11 in (2.11 m)	250 lb (113 kg)	1982-09-13	Brazil
C	27	Johan Petro	7 ft 0 in (2.13 m)	247 lb (112 kg)	1986-01-27	France
G/F	1	J. R. Smith	6 ft 6 in (1.98 m)	220 lb (100 kg)	1985-09-09	St. Benedict's Prep (NJ)
G/F	13	Sonny Weems	6 ft 6 in (1.98 m)	205 lb (93 kg)	1986-07-08	Arkansas

Coaches
Head coach
- George Karl
Assistant(s)
- Chad Iske
- Jamahl Mosley
- Adrian Dantley
- Tim Grgurich
- John Welch

Legend
- (DP) Unsigned draft pick
- (FA) Free agent
- (S) Suspended
- Injured

Roster
Updated: March 3, 2009

== Regular season ==
=== Standings ===
Northwest Division	W	L	PCT	GB	Home	Road	Div	GP
y–Denver Nuggets	54	28	.659	—	33–8	21–20	12–4	82
x–Portland Trail Blazers	54	28	.659	—	34–7	20–21	11–5	82
x–Utah Jazz	48	34	.585	6	33–8	15–26	10–6	82
Minnesota Timberwolves	24	58	.293	30	11–30	13–28	3–13	82
Oklahoma City Thunder	23	59	.280	31	15–26	8–33	4–12	82

#	Western Conference				
#	Team	W	L	PCT	GB
1	c-Los Angeles Lakers	65	17	.793	—
2	y-Denver Nuggets	54	28	.659	11
3	y-San Antonio Spurs	54	28	.659	11
4	x-Portland Trail Blazers	54	28	.659	11
5	x-Houston Rockets	53	29	.646	12
6	x-Dallas Mavericks	50	32	.610	15
7	x-New Orleans Hornets	49	33	.598	16
8	x-Utah Jazz	48	34	.585	17
9	Phoenix Suns	46	36	.561	19
10	Golden State Warriors	29	53	.354	36
11	Memphis Grizzlies	24	58	.293	41
12	Minnesota Timberwolves	24	58	.293	41
13	Oklahoma City Thunder	23	59	.280	42
14	Los Angeles Clippers	19	63	.232	46
15	Sacramento Kings	17	65	.207	48

=== Game log ===
2008–09 game log
October: 1–1 (home: 0–0; road: 1–1)

Game	Date	Team	Score	High points	High rebounds	High assists	Location Attendance	Record
1	October 29	@ Utah	L 94–98	Allen Iverson, Kenyon Martin (18)	Kenyon Martin, Chris Andersen (6)	Allen Iverson (8)	EnergySolutions Arena; 19,111	0–1
2	October 31	@ L.A. Clippers	W 113–103 (OT)	Allen Iverson (25)	Kenyon Martin (13)	Anthony Carter (6)	Staples Center; 11,418	1–1

November: 11–5 (home: 6–2; road: 5–3)

Game	Date	Team	Score	High points	High rebounds	High assists	Location Attendance	Record
3	November 1	L.A. Lakers	L 97–104	Anthony Carter (20)	Chris Andersen (7)	Allen Iverson (7)	Pepsi Center; 19,651	1–2
4	November 5	@ Golden State	L 101–111	Carmelo Anthony (28)	Nenê (15)	Anthony Carter (11)	Oracle Arena; 18,194	1–3
5	November 7	Dallas	W 108–105	Carmelo Anthony (28)	Carmelo Anthony (8)	Anthony Carter (7)	Pepsi Center; 19,175	2–3
6	November 9	Memphis	W 100–90	Carmelo Anthony (24)	Nenê (12)	Chauncey Billups (10)	Pepsi Center; 14,359	3–3
7	November 11	@ Charlotte	W 88–80	Carmelo Anthony (25)	Nenê, Linas Kleiza (8)	Anthony Carter (6)	Time Warner Cable Arena; 10,753	4–3
8	November 13	@ Cleveland	L 99–110	Chauncey Billups (26)	Kenyon Martin (10)	Chauncey Billups (6)	Quicken Loans Arena; 20,562	4–4
9	November 14	@ Boston	W 94–85	Chauncey Billups, Carmelo Anthony (18)	Carmelo Anthony (13)	Chauncey Billups (7)	TD Banknorth Garden; 18,624	5–4
10	November 16	Minnesota	W 90–84	Chauncey Billups (26)	Carmelo Anthony (12)	Chauncey Billups (5)	Pepsi Center; 16,721	6–4
11	November 18	Milwaukee	W 114–105	Linas Kleiza (25)	Nenê (6)	Chauncey Billups (5)	Pepsi Center; 14,413	7–4
12	November 19	@ San Antonio	W 91–81	Chauncey Billups (22)	Carmelo Anthony, Nenê (9)	Carmelo Anthony (7)	AT&T Center; 16,559	8–4
13	November 21	@ L.A. Lakers	L 90–104	J. R. Smith, Nenê (18)	Carmelo Anthony (10)	Chauncey Billups (9)	Staples Center; 18,997	8–5
14	November 23	Chicago	W 114–101	Kenyon Martin (26)	Carmelo Anthony (13)	Chauncey Billups, Carmelo Anthony (8)	Pepsi Center; 16,202	9–5
15	November 26	@ L.A. Clippers	W 106–105	Carmelo Anthony (30)	Carmelo Anthony (11)	Chauncey Billups (11)	Staples Center; 14,934	10–5
16	November 27	New Orleans	L 101–105	J. R. Smith (32)	Chris Andersen (8)	Anthony Carter (8)	Pepsi Center; 15,563	10–6
17	November 29	@ Minnesota	W 106–97	Chauncey Billups (27)	Carmelo Anthony (10)	Chucky Atkins (5)	Target Center; 14,197	11–6
18	November 30	Houston	W 104–94	Chauncey Billups (28)	Nenê (10)	Chauncey Billups (10)	Pepsi Center; 17,201	12–6

December: 9–6 (home: 5–2; road: 4–4)

Game	Date	Team	Score	High points	High rebounds	High assists	Location Attendance	Record
19	December 2	Toronto	W 132–93	Chauncey Billups (24)	Nenê (11)	Chauncey Billups (14)	Pepsi Center; 14,243	13–6
20	December 4	San Antonio	L 91–108	Carmelo Anthony (16)	J. R. Smith (10)	J. R. Smith, Chauncey Billups (4)	Pepsi Center; 15,866	13–7
21	December 6	@ Sacramento	W 118–85	Chauncey Billups (24)	Nenê, Carmelo Anthony (7)	Chauncey Billups (4)	ARCO Arena; 12,322	14–7
22	December 10	Minnesota	W 116–105	Carmelo Anthony (45)	Carmelo Anthony (11)	Chauncey Billups (6)	Pepsi Center; 14,007	15–7
23	December 13	Golden State	W 123–105	Carmelo Anthony (27)	Carmelo Anthony (9)	Chauncey Billups (11)	Pepsi Center; 15,322	16–7
24	December 15	@ Dallas	W 98–88	J. R. Smith (25)	Kenyon Martin (10)	Chauncey Billups (8)	American Airlines Center; 19,969	17–7
25	December 16	@ Houston	L 96–108	Carmelo Anthony (22)	Kenyon Martin (8)	Chauncey Billups (6)	Toyota Center; 17,737	17–8
26	December 19	Cleveland	L 88–105	Chauncey Billups (16)	Chris Andersen (10)	Anthony Carter, J. R. Smith (4)	Pepsi Center; 19,155	17–9
27	December 20	@ Phoenix	L 101–108	J. R. Smith (23)	Nenê (15)	Chauncey Billups (8)	US Airways Center; 18,422	17–10
28	December 22	Portland	W 97–89	Chauncey Billups, Nenê (19)	Kenyon Martin (12)	Chauncey Billups (10)	Pepsi Center; 18,611	18–10
29	December 23	@ Portland	L 92–101	Linas Kleiza (20)	Nenê (13)	Chucky Atkins (4)	Rose Garden; 20,007	18–11
30	December 26	Philadelphia	W 105–101	J. R. Smith (27)	Nenê (12)	Chauncey Billups (10)	Pepsi Center; 19,155	19–11
31	December 28	@ New York	W 117–110	Carmelo Anthony (32)	Carmelo Anthony, Nenê (9)	Chauncey Billups (5)	Madison Square Garden; 19,763	20–11
32	December 29	@ Atlanta	L 91–109	Kenyon Martin (19)	Chris Andersen (6)	Anthony Carter (7)	Philips Arena; 17,131	20–12
33	December 31	@ Toronto	W 114–107	Nenê (21)	Chris Andersen (10)	Chauncey Billups (7)	Air Canada Centre; 18,879	21–12

January: 10–4 (home: 8–2; road: 2–2)

Game	Date	Team	Score	High points	High rebounds	High assists	Location Attendance	Record
34	January 2	@ Oklahoma City	W 122–120	Carmelo Anthony (31)	Nenê (14)	Chauncey Billups, Anthony Carter (7)	Ford Center; 18,613	22–12
35	January 3	New Orleans	W 105–100	Carmelo Anthony (22)	Carmelo Anthony (7)	Chauncey Billups (6)	Pepsi Center; 19,614	23–12
36	January 5	Indiana	W 135–115	Kenyon Martin (25)	Chris Andersen (9)	Chauncey Billups (11)	Pepsi Center; 14,255	24–12
37	January 7	Miami	W 108–97	Chauncey Billups, J. R. Smith, Linas Kleiza (21)	Kenyon Martin (8)	Anthony Carter (9)	Pepsi Center; 15,459	25–12
38	January 9	Detroit	L 90–93	Chauncey Billups (30)	Nenê (9)	Chauncey Billups, J. R. Smith (4)	Pepsi Center; 19,682	25–13
39	January 13	Dallas	W 99–97	Chauncey Billups (23)	Chris Andersen (10)	J. R. Smith (7)	Pepsi Center; 14,158	26–13
40	January 15	Phoenix	W 119–113 (OT)	Chauncey Billups (26)	Nenê (14)	Chauncey Billups (8)	Pepsi Center; 18,073	27–13
41	January 17	Orlando	L 88–106	Linas Kleiza (26)	Chris Andersen (9)	Anthony Carter (7)	Pepsi Center; 19,749	27–14
42	January 19	@ Houston	L 113–115	J. R. Smith (24)	Nenê (12)	Chauncey Billups (12)	Toyota Center; 18,199	27–15
43	January 20	Sacramento	W 118–99	Linas Kleiza (27)	Nenê (12)	Anthony Carter (10)	Pepsi Center; 15,164	28–15
44	January 25	Utah	W 117–97	Nenê (28)	Linas Kleiza, Nenê (9)	Anthony Carter (10)	Pepsi Center; 17,895	29–15
45	January 27	@ Memphis	W 100–85	Chauncey Billups (29)	Kenyon Martin (10)	Kenyon Martin (4)	FedExForum; 11,338	30–15
46	January 28	@ New Orleans	L 81–94	Kenyon Martin (22)	Linas Kleiza, Kenyon Martin, J. R. Smith, Nenê (6)	Anthony Carter (6)	New Orleans Arena; 15,792	30–16
47	January 30	Charlotte	W 110–99	Nenê (22)	Nenê (12)	Anthony Carter, Chauncey Billups (6)	Pepsi Center; 18,463	31–16

February: 8–4 (home: 3–1; road: 5–3)

Game	Date	Team	Score	High points	High rebounds	High assists	Location Attendance	Record
48	February 3	San Antonio	W 104–96	Carmelo Anthony (35)	Nenê (11)	Anthony Carter (9)	Pepsi Center; 18,536	32–16
49	February 4	@ Oklahoma City	W 114–113	Carmelo Anthony (32)	Nenê (8)	Carmelo Anthony (11)	Ford Center; 18,332	33–16
50	February 6	@ Washington	W 124–103	Carmelo Anthony (23)	Nenê (10)	Anthony Carter (7)	Verizon Center; 20,173	34–16
51	February 7	@ New Jersey	L 70–114	Carmelo Anthony (15)	Nenê (7)	Chauncey Billups (3)	Izod Center; 17,697	34–17
52	February 10	@ Miami	W 99–82	Chauncey Billups (23)	Kenyon Martin (10)	Anthony Carter, Chauncey Billups (5)	American Airlines Arena; 16,784	35–17
53	February 11	@ Orlando	W 82–73	Carmelo Anthony (29)	Carmelo Anthony (8)	Chauncey Billups (4)	Amway Arena; 17,461	36–17
54	February 18	@ Philadelphia	W 101–89	Carmelo Anthony (26)	Carmelo Anthony (14)	Anthony Carter, Chauncey Billups, J. R. Smith (5)	Wachovia Center; 15,979	37–17
55	February 20	@ Chicago	L 99–116	Chauncey Billups (25)	Carmelo Anthony (8)	Chauncey Billups (6)	United Center; 21,970	37–18
56	February 22	@ Milwaukee	L 117–120	Carmelo Anthony (33)	Carmelo Anthony (9)	J. R. Smith (5)	Bradley Center; 14,891	37–19
57	February 23	Boston	L 76–114	J. R. Smith (19)	Johan Petro (10)	J. R. Smith, Chauncey Billups (5)	Pepsi Center; 19,784	37–20
58	February 25	Atlanta	W 110–109	Chauncey Billups (33)	Chris Andersen (12)	Chauncey Billups (7)	Pepsi Center; 18,418	38–20
59	February 27	L.A. Lakers	W 90–79	Chauncey Billups, J. R. Smith (22)	Carmelo Anthony, Chris Andersen (12)	Chauncey Billups (6)	Pepsi Center; 19,920	39–20

March: 10–6 (home: 7–1; road: 3–5)

Game	Date	Team	Score	High points	High rebounds	High assists	Location Attendance	Record
60	March 1	@ Indiana	L 94–100	Chauncey Billups (27)	Chris Andersen (12)	Chauncey Billups (7)	Conseco Fieldhouse; 12,458	39–21
61	March 3	@ Detroit	L 95–100	Chauncey Billups (34)	Nenê, Renaldo Balkman, Chris Andersen (7)	Chauncey Billups, Kenyon Martin (4)	The Palace of Auburn Hills; 22,076	39–22
62	March 5	Portland	W 106–90	Carmelo Anthony (38)	J. R. Smith (7)	Chauncey Billups (9)	Pepsi Center; 16,801	40–22
63	March 6	@ Utah	L 91–97	J. R. Smith (27)	Renaldo Balkman (14)	J. R. Smith (5)	EnergySolutions Arena; 19,911	40–23
64	March 8	@ Sacramento	L 106–114	Carmelo Anthony (32)	Renaldo Balkman (10)	Chauncey Billups (8)	ARCO Arena; 12,678	40–24
65	March 9	Houston	L 95–97	Chauncey Billups (28)	Nenê (8)	Chauncey Billups (5)	Pepsi Center; 16,020	40–25
66	March 11	Oklahoma City	W 112–99	Carmelo Anthony (22)	Renaldo Balkman (14)	Anthony Carter (12)	Pepsi Center; 16,186	41–25
67	March 14	L.A. Clippers	W 107–94	Renaldo Balkman (22)	Chris Andersen, Renaldo Balkman (11)	Chauncey Billups (9)	Pepsi Center; 18,676	42–25
68	March 16	New Jersey	W 121–96	J. R. Smith, Nenê (19)	Chris Andersen (9)	Chauncey Billups (10)	Pepsi Center; 16,223	43–25
69	March 18	@ Memphis	W 111–109	Carmelo Anthony (35)	Renaldo Balkman (12)	Chauncey Billups (12)	FedExForum; 11,087	44–25
70	March 20	Washington	W 116–105	J. R. Smith (40)	Chris Andersen (11)	Anthony Carter (10)	Pepsi Center; 18,231	45–25
71	March 23	@ Phoenix	L 115–118	Carmelo Anthony (29)	Kenyon Martin (9)	Chauncey Billups (8)	US Airways Center; 18,422	45–26
72	March 25	@ New Orleans	W 101–88	Carmelo Anthony (29)	Chris Andersen (9)	Chauncey Billups (6)	New Orleans Arena; 17,274	46–26
73	March 27	@ Dallas	W 103–101	Carmelo Anthony (43)	Carmelo Anthony (11)	Chauncey Billups (9)	American Airlines Center; 20,310	47–26
74	March 28	Golden State	W 129–116	Carmelo Anthony (31)	Chris Andersen (11)	Anthony Carter (13)	Pepsi Center; 19,155	48–26
75	March 31	New York	W 111–104	Carmelo Anthony (29)	Nenê (12)	Anthony Carter (8)	Pepsi Center; 17,851	49–26

April: 5–2 (home: 4–0; road: 1–2)

Game	Date	Team	Score	High points	High rebounds	High assists	Location Attendance	Record
76	April 2	Utah	W 114–104	J. R. Smith (28)	Chris Andersen (10)	J. R. Smith (7)	Pepsi Center; 17,969	50–26
77	April 4	L.A. Clippers	W 120–104	J. R. Smith (34)	Chris Andersen (8)	Chauncey Billups (9)	Pepsi Center; 17,880	51–26
78	April 5	@ Minnesota	W 110–87	Carmelo Anthony (23)	Carmelo Anthony, Chris Andersen (8)	Chauncey Billups (7)	Target Center; 16,839	52–26
79	April 8	Oklahoma City	W 122–112	Carmelo Anthony (31)	Nenê (10)	Chauncey Billups (9)	Pepsi Center; 16,536	53–26
80	April 9	@ L.A. Lakers	L 102–116	Carmelo Anthony (23)	Nenê (10)	Chauncey Billups (8)	Staples Center; 18,997	53–27
81	April 13	Sacramento	W 118–98	J. R. Smith (45)	Chris Andersen (10)	Carmelo Anthony (9)	Pepsi Center; 15,823	54–27
82	April 15	@ Portland	L 76–104	Chauncey Billups (13)	Nenê (9)	Chauncey Billups (4)	Rose Garden; 20,652	54–28

2015–16 season schedule

== Playoffs ==
=== Game log ===
2009 playoff game log
First Round: 4–1 (home: 3–0; road: 1–1)

Game	Date	Team	Score	High points	High rebounds	High assists	Location Attendance	Record
1	April 19	New Orleans	W 113–84	Billups (36)	Nenê (14)	Billups (8)	Pepsi Center; 19,536	1–0
2	April 22	New Orleans	W 108–93	Billups (31)	Nenê (8)	Anthony (9)	Pepsi Center; 19,623	2–0
3	April 25	@ New Orleans	L 93–95	Anthony (25)	Martin (10)	Billups (6)	New Orleans Arena; 17,489	2–1
4	April 27	@ New Orleans	W 121–63	Anthony (26)	Andersen (8)	Billups (8)	New Orleans Arena; 17,236	3–1
5	April 29	New Orleans	W 107–86	Anthony (34)	Andersen, Martin, Nenê (7)	Billups (11)	Pepsi Center; 19,744	4–1

Conference Semifinals: 4–1 (home: 3–0; road: 1–1)

Game	Date	Team	Score	High points	High rebounds	High assists	Location Attendance	Record
1	May 3	Dallas	W 109–95	Nenê (24)	Andersen (6)	Billups, Smith (6)	Pepsi Center; 19,631	1–0
2	May 5	Dallas	W 117–105	Anthony, Nenê (25)	Andersen (9)	Billups (8)	Pepsi Center; 19,890	2–0
3	May 9	@ Dallas	W 106–105	Billups (32)	Anthony, Nenê (8)	Nenê (4)	American Airlines Center; 20,620	3–0
4	May 11	@ Dallas	L 117–119	Anthony (41)	Anthony (11)	Billups (7)	American Airlines Center; 20,523	3–1
5	May 13	Dallas	W 124–110	Anthony (30)	Billups, Nenê (7)	Billups (12)	Pepsi Center; 19,962	4–1

Conference Finals: 2–4 (home: 1–2; road: 1–2)

Game	Date	Team	Score	High points	High rebounds	High assists	Location Attendance	Record
1	May 19	@ L.A. Lakers	L 103–105	Anthony (39)	Martin (8)	Billups (8)	Staples Center; 18,997	0–1
2	May 21	@ L.A. Lakers	W 106–103	Anthony (34)	Anthony, Nenê (9)	Nenê (6)	Staples Center; 18,997	1–1
3	May 23	L.A. Lakers	L 97–103	Anthony (21)	Andersen, Martin (7)	Billups (7)	Pepsi Center; 19,939	1–2
4	May 25	L.A. Lakers	W 120–101	Billups, Smith (24)	Martin (15)	Nenê (6)	Pepsi Center; 20,037	2–2
5	May 27	@ L.A. Lakers	L 94–103	Anthony (31)	Andersen, Nenê (8)	Billups (5)	Staples Center; 18,997	2–3
6	May 29	L.A. Lakers	L 92–119	Anthony (25)	Nenê (6)	Billups (9)	Pepsi Center; 20,053	2–4

2016 playoff schedule

== Player statistics ==
Legend
GP	Games played	GS	Games started	MPG	Minutes per game
FG%	Field-goal percentage	3P%	3-point field-goal percentage	FT%	Free-throw percentage
RPG	Rebounds per game	APG	Assists per game	SPG	Steals per game
BPG	Blocks per game	PPG	Points per game	Source:

=== Season ===
Player	GP	GS	MPG	FG%	3P%	FT%	RPG	APG	SPG	BPG	PPG
Chris Andersen	71	1	20.6	.548	.200	.718	6.20	.4	.58	2.46	6.4
Carmelo Anthony	66	66	34.5	.443	.371	.793	6.80	3.4	1.14	.36	22.8
Renaldo Balkman	53	10	14.7	.558	.286	.646	3.80	.6	.89	.43	5.0
Chauncey Billups	77	77	35.3	.420	.410	.913	3.00	6.4	1.17	.22	17.9
Anthony Carter	78	5	22.9	.433	.239	.731	2.60	4.7	1.23	.17	5.3
Dahntay Jones	79	71	18.1	.458	.647	.728	2.10	1.0	.62	.24	5.4
Jason Hart	11	0	3.3	.500	.000	.750	.40	.5	.00	.00	1.2
Linas Kleiza	82	7	22.2	.447	.326	.725	4.00	.8	.38	.17	9.9
Kenyon Martin	66	66	32.0	.491	.368	.604	6.00	2.0	1.45	1.12	11.7
Nenê	77	76	32.0	.604	.200	.723	7.80	1.4	1.23	1.31	14.6
Johan Petro	27	10	8.0	.429	.000	.429	2.30	.4	.11	.37	2.2
J.R. Smith	81	18	27.7	.446	.397	.754	3.70	2.8	.96	.17	15.2
Sonny Weems	12	0	4.6	.320	.000	.375	.30	.3	.08	.00	1.6

=== Playoffs ===
Player	GP	GS	MPG	FG%	3P%	FT%	RPG	APG	SPG	BPG	PPG
Chris Andersen	15	0	21.9	.630	.000	.659	6.30	.6	.33	2.13	6.5
Carmelo Anthony	16	16	38.3	.453	.364	.826	5.80	4.1	1.75	.63	27.2
Renaldo Balkman	8	0	2.5	.333	.000	.000	.50	.1	.50	.00	.5
Chauncey Billups	16	16	38.7	.457	.468	.906	3.80	6.8	1.25	.25	20.6
Anthony Carter	16	0	14.3	.408	.167	.500	2.00	2.1	.94	.06	2.8
Dahntay Jones	16	16	17.5	.481	.250	.767	2.40	.6	.81	.31	7.0
Jason Hart	9	0	2.1	.500	.000	.000	.30	.6	.22	.11	.2
Linas Kleiza	14	0	15.0	.470	.425	.750	3.20	.5	.36	.07	6.9
Kenyon Martin	16	16	33.6	.497	.200	.657	5.90	2.1	1.13	.88	10.9
Nenê	16	16	32.8	.548	.000	.657	7.50	2.6	1.25	.63	11.5
Johan Petro	10	0	2.6	.222	.000	.625	.60	.1	.00	.10	.9
J.R. Smith	16	0	27.2	.454	.358	.543	3.30	2.8	1.06	.25	14.9

== Transactions ==
=== Trades ===
June 26, 2008	To Chicago Bulls Ömer Aşık	To Portland Trail Blazers Nuggets’ 2009 second round pick New York's 2009 second round pick (via Chicago); Chicago's 2010 second round pick	To Denver Nuggets Sonny Weems
July 15, 2008	To Los Angeles Clippers Marcus Camby	To Denver Nuggets The rights to swap second-round picks in the 2010 NBA draft
July 22, 2008	To New York Knicks Taurean Green; Bobby Jones; 2010 second round draft pick	To Denver Nuggets Renaldo Balkman
November 3, 2008	To Detroit Pistons Allen Iverson	To Denver Nuggets Chauncey Billups; Antonio McDyess; Cheikh Samb
January 5, 2009	To Los Angeles Clippers Cheikh Samb	To Denver Nuggets Future Conditional Second-Round Draft Pick
January 7, 2009	To Oklahoma City Thunder Chucky Atkins; Conditional 2009 First-Round Draft Pick	To Denver Nuggets Johan Petro; Second-Round Draft Pick

== Free agents ==
=== Additions ===
Player	Signed	Former team
Chris Andersen	July 24	New Orleans Hornets
Dahntay Jones	July 31	Sacramento Kings
Mateen Cleaves	September 30	Bakersfield Jam
Smush Parker	September 30	Los Angeles Clippers
Nick Fazekas	September 30	Los Angeles Clippers
James Mays	September 30	Clemson Tigers
Ruben Patterson	September 30	Los Angeles Clippers
Juwan Howard	October 3	Dallas Mavericks
Jason Hart	March 3	Los Angeles Clippers

=== Subtractions ===
Player	Left	New team
Eduardo Nájera	July 11	New Jersey Nets
Yakhouba Diawara	August 7	Miami Heat
