= Chucky Atkins =

American basketball player (born 1974)

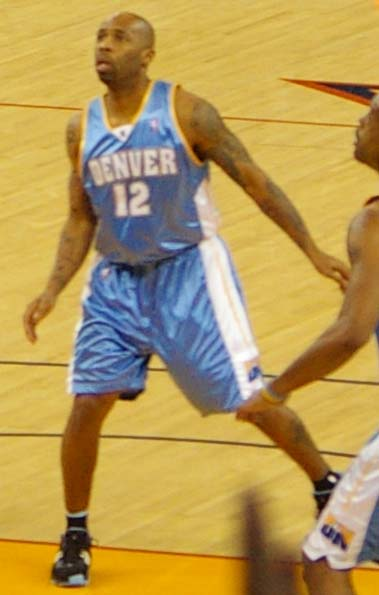
- Atkins with the Denver Nuggets in 2007

Personal information
- Born: August 14, 1974 (age 52) Orlando, Florida, U.S.
- Listed height: 5 ft 11 in (1.80 m)
- Listed weight: 185 lb (84 kg)

Career information
- High school: Maynard Evans (Orlando, Florida)
- College: South Florida (1992–1996)
- NBA draft: 1996: undrafted
- Playing career: 1996–2010
- Position: Point guard
- Number: 31, 7, 9, 32, 3, 12, 8, 17

Career history
- 1996–1997: La Crosse Bobcats
- 1997–1999: Cibona Zagreb
- 1999–2000: Orlando Magic
- 2000–2004: Detroit Pistons
- 2004: Boston Celtics
- 2004–2005: Los Angeles Lakers
- 2005–2006: Washington Wizards
- 2006–2007: Memphis Grizzlies
- 2007–2009: Denver Nuggets
- 2009: Oklahoma City Thunder
- 2009–2010: Detroit Pistons

Career highlights
- NBA All-Rookie Second Team (2000); 3× Croatian League champion (1997–1999); Croatian Cup champion (1999); CBA All-Rookie First Team (1997); Second-team All-Conference USA (1996); Second-team All-Metro Conference (1995); No. 12 jersey retired by South Florida Bulls

Career NBA statistics
- Points: 6,863 (9.9 ppg)
- Rebounds: 1,186 (1.7 rpg)
- Assists: 2,396 (3.4 apg)
- Stats at NBA.com
- Stats at Basketball Reference
Medals
Men's basketball
Representing United States
Summer Universiade
| Gold medal – first place | 1995 Fukuoka | Team competition |

Kenneth Lavon "Chucky" Atkins (born August 14, 1974) is an American former professional basketball player who played for nine different NBA teams throughout his career.

== Professional career ==
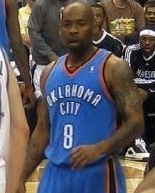
Atkins with the Oklahoma City Thunder in 2009

Atkins played college basketball at the University of South Florida from 1992 to 1996. As of November 2020, he still owns three team records. He is a member of the USF Athletic Hall of Fame.

Atkins was undrafted in the 1996 NBA draft. In 1996–97, he played with the LaCrosse Bobcats in the now-defunct Continental Basketball Association (CBA) and was named to the CBA All-Rookie First Team in 1997. He then went overseas to play for the Cibona Zagreb club in Croatia from 1997 to 1999.

Atkins started his NBA career in 1999 with his hometown Orlando Magic, with immediate impact, playing in all 82 games and averaging nine points and four assists per game. The following year, the Magic dealt Atkins and center Ben Wallace to the Detroit Pistons for star forward Grant Hill, who was acquired by Orlando in a sign-and-trade deal. In 2004, Atkins was acquired by the Boston Celtics in a three-team deal with the Atlanta Hawks, sending Mike James and Rasheed Wallace to Detroit.

In the offseason of 2004, Atkins, Chris Mihm, and Jumaine Jones were traded to the Los Angeles Lakers for Gary Payton and Rick Fox. During the 2004–05 NBA season, Atkins played well, registered career-highs in points (14 ppg) and minutes (35), playing and starting in all 82 regular season contests for the Lakers.

In the summer of 2005, Atkins was traded along with Caron Butler to the Washington Wizards in exchange for Kwame Brown and Laron Profit in the 2005 offseason. As Atkins appeared sparingly throughout the season, the Wizards bought out the remainder of his contract on January 18, 2006. Atkins had voiced displeasure with the amount of playing time he was receiving, and he and the team both felt a change of scenery was needed.

On January 23, 2006, Atkins signed as a free agent with the Memphis Grizzlies, replacing the injured Damon Stoudamire. Atkins averaged in double figures in his half-season stint in Memphis.

Atkins signed as a free agent in July 2007 with the Denver Nuggets. A hernia injury plagued him throughout most of the year, and he failed to have a significant impact in the 2007–08 NBA season.

On January 7, 2009, the Nuggets traded Atkins, along with a 2009 first round draft pick and cash considerations, to the Oklahoma City Thunder for Johan Petro and a 2009 second round draft pick.

On July 27, 2009, Atkins was traded to the Minnesota Timberwolves along with Damien Wilkins for center Etan Thomas and two future second-round draft picks. On September 22, 2009, Chucky Atkins was waived by the Minnesota Timberwolves. He signed a non guaranteed contract with the Detroit Pistons on September 28, 2009. Atkins played 40 games for the Pistons in his second stint with them during the 2009–2010 season .

On September 27, 2010, Atkins signed with the Phoenix Suns. He was waived on October 11, 2010.

After retiring from the game in 2011, Atkins went on to coach his alum high school in 2012–13 and 2013–14 before quitting the job on the eve of the 2014–15 season after he was arrested on charges of driving under the influence twice within three months.

== NBA career statistics ==
Legend
| GP | Games played | GS | Games started | MPG | Minutes per game |
| FG% | Field goal percentage | 3P% | 3-point field goal percentage | FT% | Free throw percentage |
| RPG | Rebounds per game | APG | Assists per game | SPG | Steals per game |
| BPG | Blocks per game | PPG | Points per game | **Bold** | Career high |
| * | Led the league |

=== Regular season ===
| Year | Team | GP | GS | MPG | FG% | 3P% | FT% | RPG | APG | SPG | BPG | PPG |
|---|---|---|---|---|---|---|---|---|---|---|---|---|
| 1999–00 | Orlando | **82** | 0 | 19.8 | .424 | .350 | .729 | 1.5 | 3.7 | .6 | .0 | 9.5 |
| 2000–01 | Detroit | 81 | 75 | 29.2 | .399 | .357 | .692 | 2.1 | 4.1 | .8 | **.1** | 12.0 |
| 2001–02 | Detroit | 79 | 62 | 28.9 | **.466** | **.411** | .692 | 2.0 | 3.3 | .9 | **.1** | 12.1 |
| 2002–03 | Detroit | 65 | 7 | 21.5 | .361 | .355 | .816 | 1.5 | 2.7 | .4 | **.1** | 7.1 |
| 2003–04 | Detroit | 40 | 0 | 18.8 | .374 | .323 | .721 | 1.2 | 2.4 | .5 | .0 | 6.2 |
| 2003–04 | Boston | 24 | 24 | 33.0 | .418 | .351 | .778 | 1.9 | **5.3** | **1.1** | .0 | 12.0 |
| 2004–05 | L.A. Lakers | **82** | **82*** | **35.4** | .426 | .387 | .803 | **2.4** | 4.4 | .9 | .0 | **13.6** |
| 2005–06 | Washington | 28 | 2 | 19.7 | .379 | .359 | .710 | 1.6 | 2.5 | .5 | .0 | 6.7 |
| 2005–06 | Memphis | 43 | 39 | 27.0 | .401 | .352 | .811 | 1.7 | 3.0 | .7 | **.1** | 11.4 |
| 2006–07 | Memphis | 75 | 23 | 27.5 | .434 | .379 | .810 | 1.9 | 4.6 | .7 | **.1** | 13.2 |
| 2007–08 | Denver | 24 | 0 | 14.7 | .344 | .316 | .444 | 1.3 | 2.0 | .4 | .0 | 4.7 |
| 2008–09 | Denver | 14 | 0 | 8.2 | .333 | .294 | **1.000** | .4 | 2.0 | .1 | **.1** | 1.9 |
| 2008–09 | Oklahoma City | 18 | 0 | 16.6 | .291 | .250 | .917 | 1.0 | 1.7 | .4 | **.1** | 3.9 |
| 2009–10 | Detroit | 40 | 11 | 16.1 | .363 | .301 | .926 | .7 | 2.3 | .4 | .0 | 4.0 |
| Career | | 696 | 325 | 24.9 | .412 | .364 | .772 | 1.7 | 3.4 | .7 | .0 | 9.9 |

=== Playoffs ===
| Year | Team | GP | GS | MPG | FG% | 3P% | FT% | RPG | APG | SPG | BPG | PPG |
|---|---|---|---|---|---|---|---|---|---|---|---|---|
| 2002 | Detroit | 10 | **10** | 29.4 | .364 | .359 | .765 | 2.4 | 3.4 | .6 | **.1** | 11.3 |
| 2003 | Detroit | **17** | 3 | 18.4 | .352 | **.367** | .808 | 1.2 | 1.5 | **1.0** | .0 | 6.1 |
| 2004 | Boston | 4 | 4 | **33.3** | **.436** | .300 | **.895** | **3.5** | **3.8** | .8 | .0 | **13.5** |
| 2006 | Memphis | 4 | 4 | 25.8 | .405 | .364 | .625 | .8 | 3.0 | .5 | .0 | 9.8 |
| 2008 | Denver | 1 | 0 | 3.0 | .000 | .000 | .000 | 1.0 | .0 | .0 | .0 | .0 |
| Career | | 36 | 21 | 23.5 | .374 | .355 | .800 | 1.7 | 2.4 | .8 | .0 | 8.6 |
