= 2008–09 Oklahoma City Thunder season =

NBA professional basketball team season

- Head coach: P. J. Carlesimo (games 1–13, fired); Scott Brooks (interim, games 14–82)
- General manager: Sam Presti
- Owners: Professional Basketball Club LLC
- Arena: Ford Center

Results
- Record: 23–59 (.280)
- Place: Division: 5th (Northwest); Conference: 13th (Western)
- Playoff finish: Did not qualify
- Stats at Basketball Reference

Local media
- Television: KSBI; Fox Sports Oklahoma
- Radio: WWLS-AM; FM

The Oklahoma City Thunder played its inaugural season in the 2008–09 NBA season. It was the team's first season in Oklahoma City since the Seattle SuperSonics relocation was approved by league owners prior to settling a lawsuit. The team played at the Ford Center.

Oklahoma City hosted the New Orleans Hornets for two seasons, due to Hurricane Katrina's devastation along the Gulf Coast in August 2005.

The Thunder finished with a 23–59 record, and would not have a losing season again until the 2020–21 season.

== Key dates ==
- June 26: The 2008 NBA draft took place in New York City.
- July 1: The free agency period started.
- July 2: The Seattle SuperSonics announced their immediate relocation to Oklahoma City, Oklahoma.
- September 3 The team announces name and colors.
- October 8 The Oklahoma City Thunder took the court for the first time in an 88–82 preseason loss against the Minnesota Timberwolves in Billings, Montana.
- October 29 The Oklahoma City Thunder played their first regular season game ever, hosting the Milwaukee Bucks.
- November 2 The Oklahoma City Thunder get their first win as an NBA franchise.
- November 22 P. J. Carlesimo is fired and replaced on an interim basis by Scott Brooks.
- November 28 The Thunder tie the franchise record for consecutive games lost at 14 with a 103–105 loss to the Timberwolves.
- November 29 Oklahoma City snaps 14-game losing streak.
- January 21 Jeff Green shoots Thunder's first buzzer beater to beat the Golden State Warriors 122–121.
- February 14 Kevin Durant wins All-Star Break H.O.R.S.E competition.
- April 15 The Thunder won over Los Angeles Clippers 126–85 to end 23–59 in their first season.
- April 15 Scott Brooks is named full-time coach of Thunder.

== Offseason ==
- Oklahoma City rookies and other young professionals played in the first game of the Orlando summer league. Oklahoma City lost its summer league opener to the Indiana Pacers rookies by a score of 95–78. Earl Calloway scored 16 points and Andre Emmett had 15 for the Pacers, who scored the game's first eight points and never trailed. Jeff Green took the first shot in Oklahoma City's history and it bounced off the rim 43 seconds after tipoff. The first basket came 2:15 into the first quarter by D.J. White, who was drafted by Detroit, traded to Seattle and played in Oklahoma City.
- The Oklahoma City franchise released its season-ticket prices on Thursday, August 14. The franchise announced that there will be 3,400 seats available at $10 per game.
  - On average, ticket prices were about 36 per cent higher than they were for the 2007–08 Seattle SuperSonics season. The announcement also stated that the average ticket price would be US$47.51 while Seattle's average ticket price last season was $35. While last year's NBA average ticket price at $48.83, Oklahoma City's rates below the league average.
  - Season tickets went on sale on Monday, September 8. Chairman Clay Bennett announced that the last of the 13,000 season tickets available were sold on Friday, September 12, and the team started a waiting list for season tickets.

== Pre-season ==
- The Oklahoma City Thunder made their debut in an 88-82 preseason loss to the Minnesota Timberwolves on October 8, 2008.

=== First pre-season game ===
KSBI

October 8, 2008

Oklahoma City Thunder 82, Minnesota Timberwolves 88
Scoring by quarter: 13–24, 28–16, 22–20, 19–28
Pts: Damien Wilkins 19; Rebs: Kevin Durant, Johan Petro 7 each Asts: Earl Watson 4	Pts: Rashad McCants 15; Rebs: Al Jefferson 9 Asts: Mike Miller 5

Rimrock Auto Arena, Billings
Attendance: 3,817
Referees: Leroy Richardson, David Jones, Eric Dalen

- Kevin Durant took and made the first shot in Oklahoma City history.
- The Thunder had their home debut on October 14, 2008, against the Los Angeles Clippers.

== Draft picks ==
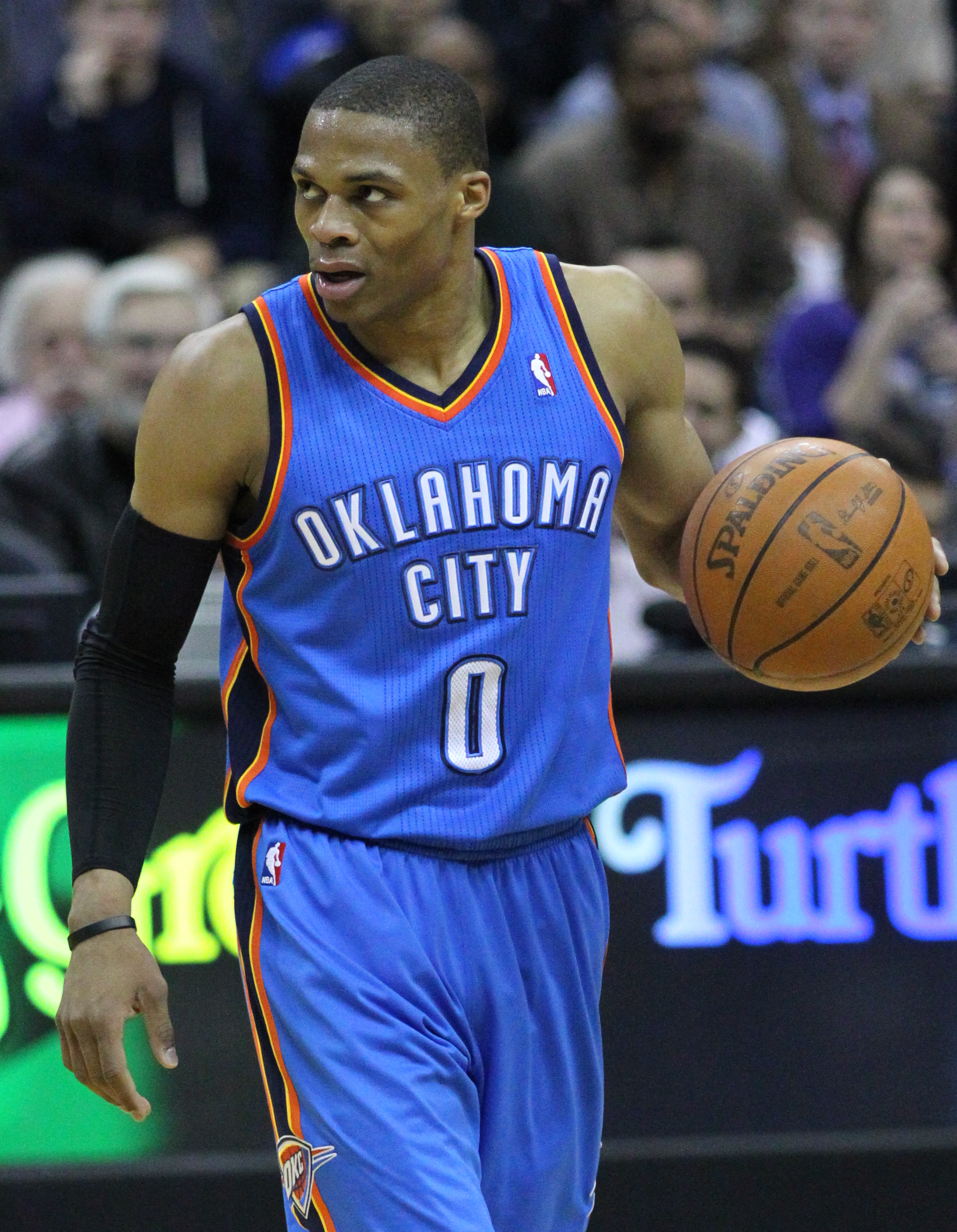
Russell Westbrook

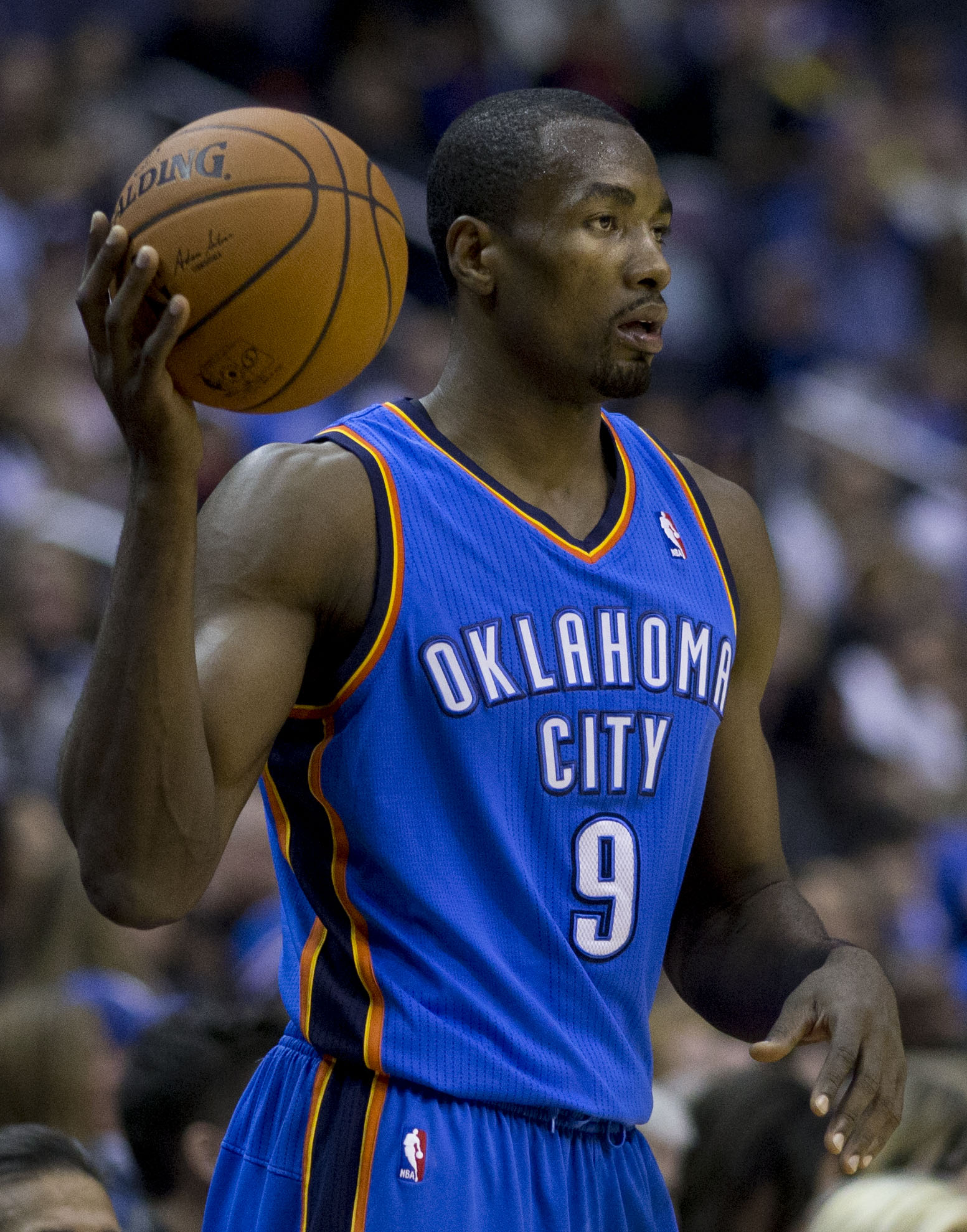
Serge Ibaka

The 2008 NBA Draft was the final time that the Seattle SuperSonics made an NBA Draft appearance, as well as the final time that the SuperSonics appeared in official media publications. In early July, the franchise relocated to Oklahoma City, Oklahoma, and was renamed the Oklahoma City Thunder. The Thunder made their first NBA Draft appearance in 2009.

The SuperSonics entered the draft with two first-round picks and four second-round picks. They retained their original pick in each round, while the remainder were acquired through previous trades.

Round	Pick	Player	Position	Nationality	College/club team
1	4	Russell Westbrook	PG	United States	UCLA
1	24	Serge Ibaka	PF	Republic of the Congo; Spain	L'Hospitalet (Spain)
2	32	Walter Sharpe	PF	United States	UAB
2	46	Trent Plaisted	PF	United States	BYU
2	50	DeVon Hardin	C	United States	California
2	56	Sasha Kaun	C	Russia	Kansas
D.J. White was later traded to the SuperSonics via Detroit Pistons

== Roster ==
2008–09 Oklahoma City Thunder roster
Players

Pos.	No.	Player	Height	Weight	DOB	From
PG	8	Chucky Atkins	5 ft 11 in (1.80 m)	160 lb (73 kg)	1974-08-14	South Florida
C	4	Nick Collison	6 ft 9 in (2.06 m)	255 lb (116 kg)	1980-10-26	Kansas
SF	35	Kevin Durant	6 ft 9 in (2.06 m)	215 lb (98 kg)	1988-09-29	Texas
PF	22	Jeff Green	6 ft 9 in (2.06 m)	235 lb (107 kg)	1986-08-28	Georgetown
PF	51	Steven Hill	7 ft 0 in (2.13 m)	248 lb (112 kg)	1985-11-14	Arkansas
C	12	Nenad Krstić	7 ft 0 in (2.13 m)	240 lb (109 kg)	1983-07-25	Serbia
PG	14	Shaun Livingston	6 ft 7 in (2.01 m)	182 lb (83 kg)	1985-09-11	Peoria Central HS (IL)
SG	34	Desmond Mason	6 ft 7 in (2.01 m)	224 lb (102 kg)	1977-10-11	Oklahoma State
PF	9	Malik Rose	6 ft 7 in (2.01 m)	250 lb (113 kg)	1974-11-23	Drexel
SG	2	Thabo Sefolosha	6 ft 5 in (1.96 m)	215 lb (98 kg)	1984-05-02	Switzerland
C	31	Robert Swift	7 ft 0 in (2.13 m)	245 lb (111 kg)	1985-12-03	Bakersfield HS (CA)
PG	25	Earl Watson	6 ft 1 in (1.85 m)	195 lb (88 kg)	1979-06-12	UCLA
SG	5	Kyle Weaver	6 ft 6 in (1.98 m)	201 lb (91 kg)	1986-02-18	Washington State
PG	0	Russell Westbrook	6 ft 3 in (1.91 m)	187 lb (85 kg)	1988-11-12	UCLA
PF	3	D. J. White	6 ft 9 in (2.06 m)	251 lb (114 kg)	1986-08-31	Indiana
C	54	Chris Wilcox	6 ft 8 in (2.03 m)	221 lb (100 kg)	1982-09-03	Maryland
SG	21	Damien Wilkins	6 ft 6 in (1.98 m)	225 lb (102 kg)	1980-01-11	Georgia

Coaches
Head coach
- P. J. Carlesimo (fired)
- Scott Brooks
Assistant(s)
- Mark Bryant
- Ralph Lewis
- Paul Westhead

Legend
- (DP) Unsigned draft pick
- (FA) Free agent
- (S) Suspended
- Injured

Roster
Updated: April 4, 2009

== Regular season ==
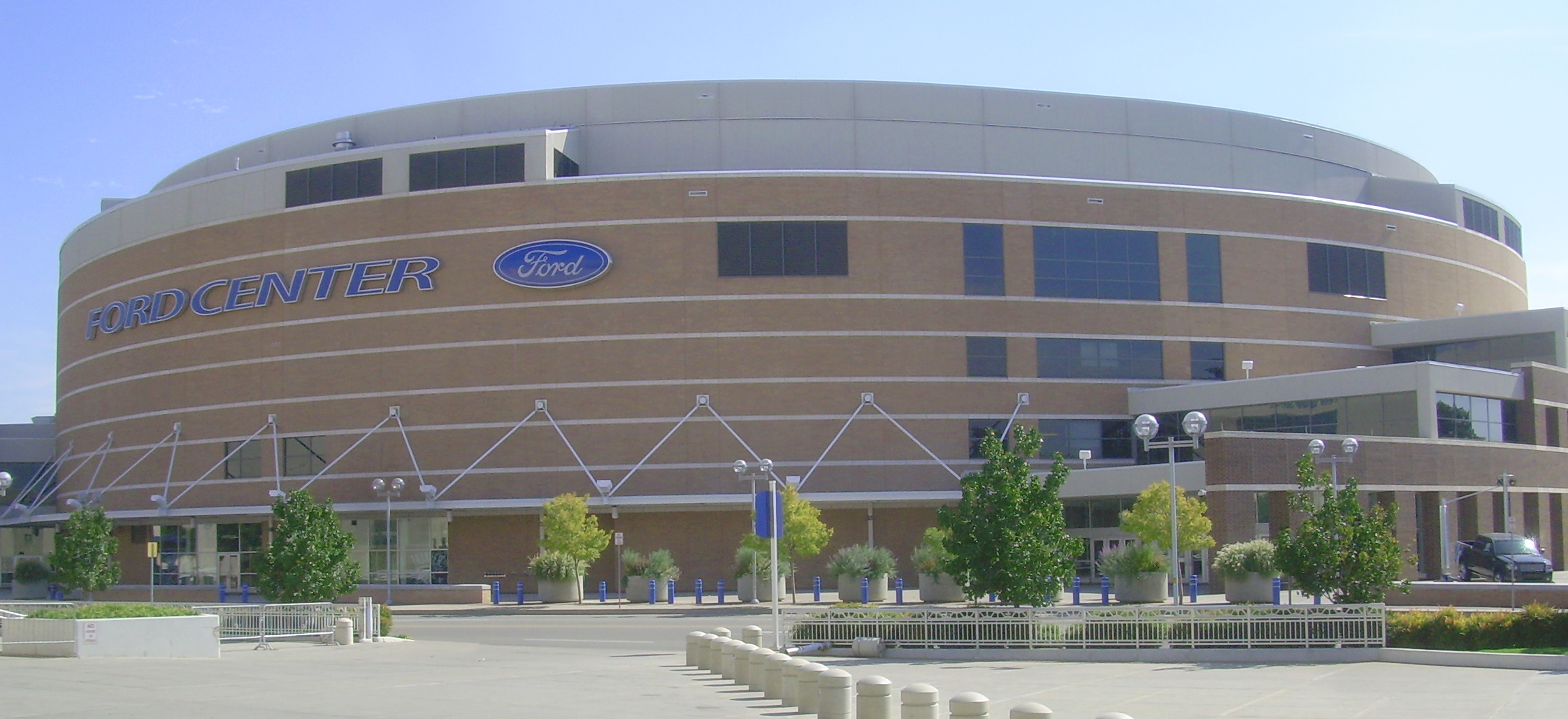
The Ford Center, which seats 19,599 for basketball, was built in 2002 and has received public funding for renovation.

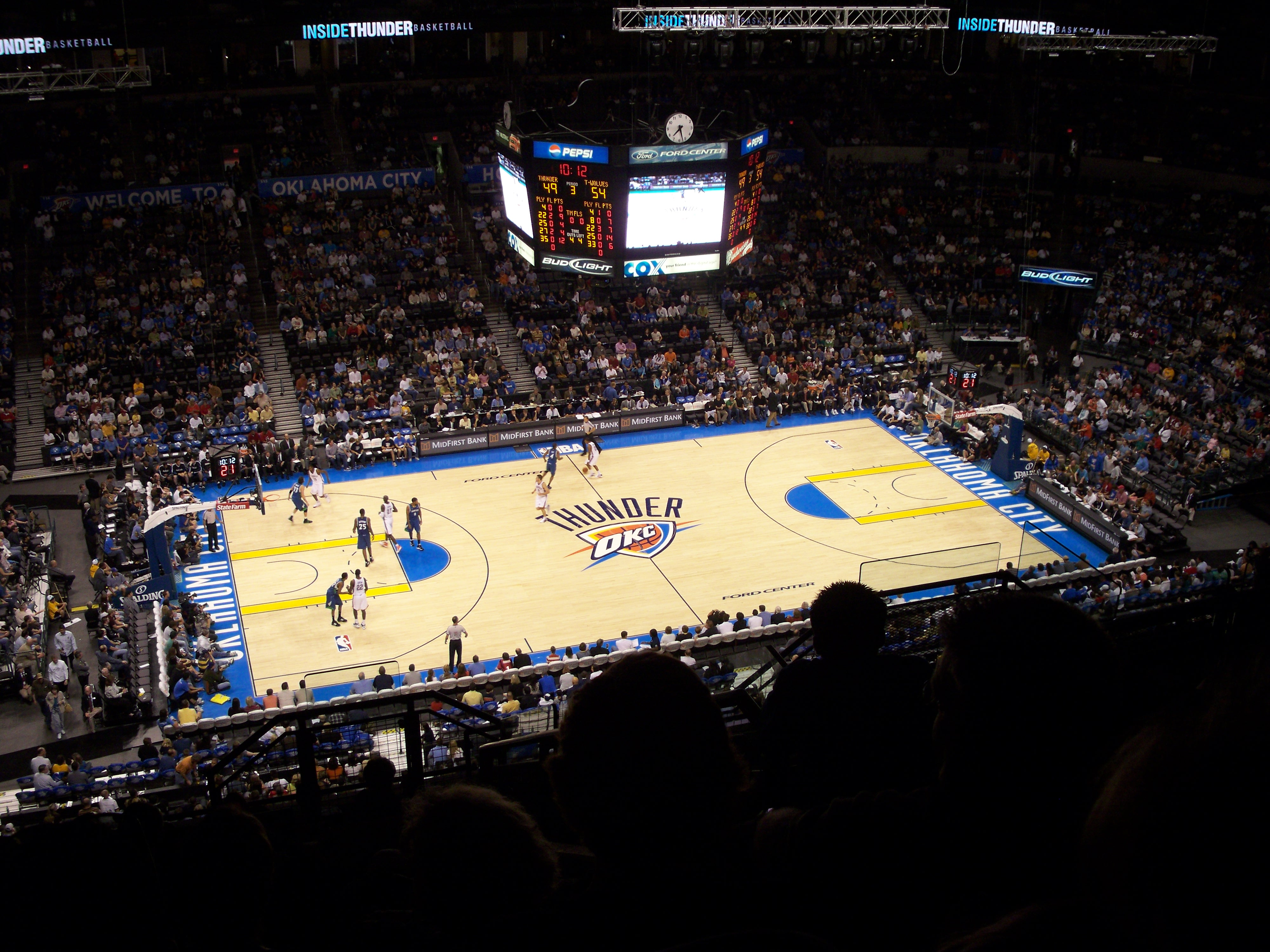
Oklahoma City Thunder host the Minnesota Timberwolves on November 2, 2008, a matchup that led to their first win under the new name.

=== Standings ===
Northwest Division	W	L	PCT	GB	Home	Road	Div	GP
y–Denver Nuggets	54	28	.659	—	33–8	21–20	12–4	82
x–Portland Trail Blazers	54	28	.659	—	34–7	20–21	11–5	82
x–Utah Jazz	48	34	.585	6	33–8	15–26	10–6	82
Minnesota Timberwolves	24	58	.293	30	11–30	13–28	3–13	82
Oklahoma City Thunder	23	59	.280	31	15–26	8–33	4–12	82

#	Western Conference				
#	Team	W	L	PCT	GB
1	c-Los Angeles Lakers	65	17	.793	—
2	y-Denver Nuggets	54	28	.659	11
3	y-San Antonio Spurs	54	28	.659	11
4	x-Portland Trail Blazers	54	28	.659	11
5	x-Houston Rockets	53	29	.646	12
6	x-Dallas Mavericks	50	32	.610	15
7	x-New Orleans Hornets	49	33	.598	16
8	x-Utah Jazz	48	34	.585	17
9	Phoenix Suns	46	36	.561	19
10	Golden State Warriors	29	53	.354	36
11	Memphis Grizzlies	24	58	.293	41
12	Minnesota Timberwolves	24	58	.293	41
13	Oklahoma City Thunder	23	59	.280	42
14	Los Angeles Clippers	19	63	.232	46
15	Sacramento Kings	17	65	.207	48

=== Game log ===
2008–09 game log
October: 0–1 (home: 0–1; road: 0–0)

Game	Date	Team	Score	High points	High rebounds	High assists	Location Attendance	Record
1	October 29	Milwaukee	L 87–98	Russell Westbrook, Chris Wilcox (13)	Nick Collison, Chris Wilcox (6)	Russell Westbrook, Earl Watson (4)	Ford Center; 19,136	0–1

November: 2–15 (home: 1–8; road: 1–7)

Game	Date	Team	Score	High points	High rebounds	High assists	Location Attendance	Record
2	November 1	@ Houston	L 77–89	Kevin Durant (26)	Johan Petro (9)	Earl Watson (8)	Toyota Center; 16,996	0–2
3	November 2	Minnesota	W 88–85	Kevin Durant (18)	Nick Collison (10)	Earl Watson (4)	Ford Center; 18,163	1–2
4	November 5	Boston	L 83–96	Kevin Durant (17)	Chris Wilcox (8)	Earl Watson (5)	Ford Center; 19,136	1–3
5	November 7	@ Utah	L 97–104	Kevin Durant (24)	Nick Collison, Joe Smith, Chris Wilcox (6)	Kevin Durant, Earl Watson (3)	EnergySolutions Arena; 19,911	1–4
6	November 9	Atlanta	L 85–89	Kevin Durant (20)	Joe Smith (9)	Earl Watson (6)	Ford Center; 18,231	1–5
7	November 10	@ Indiana	L 99–107	Kevin Durant (37)	Kevin Durant, Nick Collison, Johan Petro (8)	Earl Watson (9)	Conseco Fieldhouse; 10,165	1–6
8	November 12	Orlando	L 92–109	Jeff Green (25)	Jeff Green (10)	Earl Watson (8)	Ford Center; 18,185	1–7
9	November 14	@ New York	L 106–116	Kevin Durant (23)	Robert Swift (13)	Earl Watson (8)	Madison Square Garden; 18,008	1–8
10	November 15	@ Philadelphia	L 85–110	Jeff Green (21)	Johan Petro (12)	Jeff Green, Russell Westbrook (4)	Wachovia Center; 13,385	1–9
11	November 17	Houston	L 89–100	Kevin Durant (29)	Robert Swift, Johan Petro (8)	Kevin Durant, Earl Watson (4)	Ford Center; 18,145	1–10
12	November 19	L.A. Clippers	L 88–108	Kevin Durant (18)	Joe Smith (7)	Earl Watson (5)	Ford Center; 18,312	1–11
13	November 21	New Orleans	L 80–105	Kevin Durant (17)	Nick Collison (13)	Earl Watson (4)	Ford Center; 19,136	1–12
14	November 22	@ New Orleans	L 97–109	Kevin Durant (30)	Chris Wilcox (10)	Russell Westbrook (11)	New Orleans Arena; 16,023	1–13
15	November 25	Phoenix	L 98–99	Kevin Durant (29)	Chris Wilcox, Jeff Green, Earl Watson, Joe Smith (6)	Earl Watson (13)	Ford Center; 19,136	1–14
16	November 26	@ Cleveland	L 82–117	Chris Wilcox (14)	Chris Wilcox, Nick Collison (5)	Russell Westbrook, Kyle Weaver (5)	Quicken Loans Arena; 19,753	1–15
17	November 28	Minnesota	L 103–105	Kevin Durant, Jeff Green (22)	Chris Wilcox (7)	Russell Westbrook (8)	Ford Center; 18,229	1–16
18	November 29	@ Memphis	W 111–103	Kevin Durant (30)	Kevin Durant (7)	Earl Watson (7)	FedExForum; 11,977	2–16

December: 2–13 (home: 2–5; road: 0–8)

Game	Date	Team	Score	High points	High rebounds	High assists	Location Attendance	Record
19	December 3	@ Charlotte	L 97–103	Kevin Durant (24)	Jeff Green (6)	Earl Watson (11)	Time Warner Cable Arena; 11,629	2–17
20	December 5	@ Orlando	L 89–98	Russell Westbrook (19)	Kevin Durant (10)	Russell Westbrook (5)	Amway Arena; 16,812	2–18
21	December 6	@ Miami	L 99–105	Russell Westbrook (30)	Jeff Green (9)	Earl Watson (12)	American Airlines Arena; 17,585	2–19
22	December 8	Golden State	L 102–112	Kevin Durant (41)	Kevin Durant, Nick Collison (10)	Russell Westbrook, Earl Watson (7)	Ford Center; 17,854	2–20
23	December 10	Memphis	L 102–108	Kevin Durant (28)	Nick Collison (8)	Earl Watson (7)	Ford Center; 18,009	2–21
24	December 13	@ Dallas	L 99–103	Jeff Green (25)	Kevin Durant, Russell Westbrook, Nick Collison (8)	Russell Westbrook, Earl Watson (6)	American Airlines Center; 20,190	2–22
25	December 14	@ San Antonio	L 104–109	Jeff Green (33)	Kevin Durant (13)	Nick Collison (5)	AT&T Center; 17,419	2–23
26	December 16	L.A. Clippers	L 88–98	Kevin Durant (25)	Russell Westbrook, Desmond Mason (7)	Earl Watson (12)	Ford Center; 18,275	2–24
27	December 19	Toronto	W 91–83	Kevin Durant (26)	Desmond Mason (10)	Russell Westbrook (8)	Ford Center; 18,806	3–24
28	December 21	Cleveland	L 91–102	Kevin Durant (26)	Jeff Green (10)	Russell Westbrook (11)	Ford Center; 19,136	3–25
29	December 23	@ Atlanta	L 88–99	Kevin Durant (28)	Jeff Green (14)	Earl Watson (7)	Philips Arena; 12,138	3–26
30	December 26	@ Detroit	L 88–90	Kevin Durant (26)	Joe Smith (10)	Earl Watson (6)	The Palace of Auburn Hills; 22,076	3–27
31	December 27	@ Washington	L 95–104	Kevin Durant (25)	Kevin Durant (11)	Earl Watson (6)	Verizon Center; 16,181	3–28
32	December 29	Phoenix	L 102–110	Russell Westbrook (31)	Jeff Green (11)	Russell Westbrook (5)	Ford Center; 19,136	3–29
33	December 31	Golden State	W 107–100	Jeff Green (26)	Kevin Durant (10)	Kevin Durant, Earl Watson (6)	Ford Center; 18,229	4–29

January: 7–7 (home: 5–3; road: 2–4)

Game	Date	Team	Score	High points	High rebounds	High assists	Location Attendance	Record
34	January 2	Denver	L 120–122	Kevin Durant (33)	Kevin Durant (9)	Earl Watson (7)	Ford Center; 18,613	4–30
35	January 6	New York	W 107–99	Kevin Durant, Jeff Green (27)	Kevin Durant (12)	Russell Westbrook (9)	Ford Center; 18,487	5–30
36	January 7	@ Minnesota	L 87–129	Nick Collison (17)	Nick Collison (10)	Russell Westbrook (12)	Target Center; 10,272	5–31
37	January 9	Houston	L 96–98	Kevin Durant (27)	Nick Collison (10)	Russell Westbrook (6)	Ford Center; 19,136	5–32
38	January 10	@ Chicago	W 109–98 (OT)	Kevin Durant (28)	Kevin Durant, Jeff Green, Russell Westbrook (12)	Earl Watson (11)	United Center; 20,469	6–32
39	January 12	@ New Jersey	L 99–103 (OT)	Kevin Durant (26)	Jeff Green (10)	Earl Watson (9)	Izod Center; 12,972	6–33
40	January 14	Utah	W 114–93	Jeff Green (23)	Nenad Krstić, Nick Collison (11)	Russell Westbrook (7)	Ford Center; 18,437	7–33
41	January 16	Detroit	W 89–79	Kevin Durant (32)	Jeff Green (14)	Russell Westbrook (6)	Ford Center; 19,136	8–33
42	January 18	Miami	L 94–104	Kevin Durant (31)	Russell Westbrook (8)	Earl Watson (6)	Ford Center; 19,136	8–34
43	January 21	@ Golden State	W 122–121	Russell Westbrook (30)	Kevin Durant (12)	Russell Westbrook (7)	Oracle Arena; 19,318	9–34
44	January 23	@ L.A. Clippers	L 104–107	Kevin Durant (46)	Kevin Durant (15)	Kyle Weaver (5)	Staples Center; 14,913	9–35
45	January 26	New Jersey	W 94–85	Kevin Durant (18)	Chris Wilcox (9)	Kevin Durant, Russell Westbrook (4)	Ford Center; 18,264	10–35
46	January 28	Memphis	W 114–102 (OT)	Kevin Durant (35)	Kevin Durant (10)	Kevin Durant (6)	Ford Center; 18,450	11–35
47	January 30	@ Utah	L 90–110	Kevin Durant (29)	Kevin Durant (10)	Kevin Durant, Earl Watson (4)	EnergySolutions Arena; 19,911	11–36

February: 3–9 (home: 2–3; road: 1–6)

Game	Date	Team	Score	High points	High rebounds	High assists	Location Attendance	Record
48	February 1	@ Sacramento	L 118–122 (OT)	Russell Westbrook (34)	Nick Collison (14)	Russell Westbrook (8)	ARCO Arena; 10,817	11–37
49	February 4	Denver	L 113–114	Kevin Durant (31)	Kevin Durant, Nick Collison (8)	Earl Watson (8)	Ford Center; 18,332	11–38
50	February 6	Portland	W 102–93	Kevin Durant (31)	Nick Collison (13)	Earl Watson (11)	Ford Center; 18,694	12–38
51	February 8	Sacramento	W 116–113	Kevin Durant (39)	Kevin Durant, Jeff Green, Russell Westbrook (7)	Russell Westbrook (8)	Ford Center; 18,271	13–38
52	February 10	@ L.A. Lakers	L 98–105	Kevin Durant (31)	Kevin Durant (10)	Russell Westbrook (7)	Staples Center; 18,997	13–39
53	February 11	@ Portland	L 92–106	Russell Westbrook (21)	Russell Westbrook (12)	Earl Watson (5)	Rose Garden; 20,050	13–40
54	February 17	New Orleans	L 98–100	Kevin Durant (47)	Nenad Krstić (10)	Earl Watson (7)	Ford Center; 18,593	13–41
55	February 20	@ Phoenix	L 118–140	Kevin Durant (35)	Jeff Green (14)	Russell Westbrook (8)	US Airways Center; 18,422	13–42
56	February 21	@ Golden State	L 120–133	Kevin Durant (32)	Jeff Green (15)	Russell Westbrook (11)	Oracle Arena; 19,108	13–43
57	February 24	L.A. Lakers	L 93–107	Kevin Durant (32)	Nenad Krstić (11)	Kevin Durant (6)	Ford Center; 19,136	13–44
58	February 27	@ Dallas	L 108–110 (OT)	Russell Westbrook (33)	Jeff Green (12)	Earl Watson (11)	American Airlines Center; 20,007	13–45
59	February 28	@ Memphis	W 99–92	Jeff Green (27)	Thabo Sefolosha (11)	Russell Westbrook (7)	FedExForum; 10,074	14–45

March: 7–8 (home: 4–3; road: 3–5)

Game	Date	Team	Score	High points	High rebounds	High assists	Location Attendance	Record
60	March 2	Dallas	W 96–87	Nenad Krstić (26)	Russell Westbrook (10)	Russell Westbrook (10)	Ford Center; 18,527	15–45
61	March 4	Washington	W 88–83	Nenad Krstić (18)	Nick Collison (10)	Russell Westbrook (8)	Ford Center; 18,576	16–45
62	March 7	@ New Orleans	L 90–108	Russell Westbrook (24)	Nick Collison (8)	Malik Rose (5)	New Orleans Arena; 18,114	16–46
63	March 8	Philadelphia	W 89–74	Nenad Krstić (20)	Nick Collison (11)	Russell Westbrook (5)	Ford Center; 18,738	17–46
64	March 10	@ Sacramento	W 99–98	Jeff Green, Russell Westbrook (22)	Nenad Krstić (15)	Russell Westbrook (4)	ARCO Arena; 10,784	18–46
65	March 11	@ Denver	L 99–112	Jeff Green (19)	Thabo Sefolosha (9)	Earl Watson (7)	Pepsi Center; 16,186	18–47
66	March 14	@ Phoenix	L 95–106	Kevin Durant (22)	Jeff Green (10)	Russell Westbrook (7)	US Airways Center; 18,422	18–48
67	March 16	San Antonio	W 78–76	Kevin Durant (25)	Nick Collison (10)	Chucky Atkins (3)	Ford Center; 19,136	19–48
68	March 18	Chicago	L 96–103	Kevin Durant (28)	Nick Collison (13)	Russell Westbrook (6)	Ford Center; 19,136	19–49
69	March 20	Utah	L 94–101	Kevin Durant (24)	Kevin Durant (12)	Kevin Durant (5)	Ford Center; 19,136	19–50
70	March 22	@ Minnesota	W 97–90	Kevin Durant (30)	Kevin Durant, Russell Westbrook (8)	Russell Westbrook (10)	Target Center; 18,561	20–50
71	March 24	L.A. Lakers	L 89–107	Kevin Durant (24)	Nick Collison (8)	Russell Westbrook (6)	Ford Center; 19,136	20–51
72	March 27	@ Toronto	L 96–112	Nick Collison (21)	Nick Collison, Thabo Sefolosha (7)	Russell Westbrook (5)	Air Canada Centre; 17,127	20–52
73	March 29	@ Boston	L 84–103	Russell Westbrook (23)	Jeff Green (9)	Kyle Weaver (7)	TD Banknorth Garden; 18,624	20–53
74	March 31	@ San Antonio	W 96–95	Kevin Durant (31)	Kevin Durant, Nenad Krstić (8)	Russell Westbrook (10)	AT&T Center; 18,797	21–53

April: 2–6 (home: 1–3; road: 1–3)

Game	Date	Team	Score	High points	High rebounds	High assists	Location Attendance	Record
75	April 3	Portland	L 72–107	Kevin Durant (13)	Russell Westbrook (8)	Chucky Atkins, Russell Westbrook (4)	Ford Center; 19,136	21–54
76	April 5	Indiana	L 99–117	Kevin Durant (25)	Shaun Livingston, Russell Westbrook (7)	Shaun Livingston (5)	Ford Center; 19,136	21–55
77	April 7	San Antonio	L 89–99	Kevin Durant (24)	Thabo Sefolosha (9)	Kevin Durant, Russell Westbrook (6)	Ford Center; 19,136	21–56
78	April 8	@ Denver	L 112–122	Kevin Durant (31)	Kevin Durant (7)	Russell Westbrook (11)	Pepsi Center; 16,536	21–57
79	April 10	Charlotte	W 84–81	Kevin Durant (20)	Jeff Green (11)	Russell Westbrook (11)	Ford Center; 19,136	22–57
80	April 11	@ Milwaukee	L 98–115	Kevin Durant (19)	Kyle Weaver (9)	Earl Watson (7)	Bradley Center; 15,418	22–58
81	April 13	@ Portland	L 83–113	Earl Watson (16)	Nenad Krstić (7)	Russell Westbrook (7)	Rose Garden; 20,655	22–59
82	April 15	@ L.A. Clippers	W 126–85	Kevin Durant (26)	D. J. White (11)	Earl Watson (14)	Staples Center; 19,060	23–59

2008–09 season schedule

== Player statistics ==
Legend
GP	Games played	GS	Games started	MPG	Minutes per game
FG%	Field-goal percentage	3P%	3-point field-goal percentage	FT%	Free-throw percentage
RPG	Rebounds per game	APG	Assists per game	SPG	Steals per game
BPG	Blocks per game	PPG	Points per game

=== Season ===
Oklahoma City Thunder statistics
Player	GP	GS	MPG	FG%	3P%	FT%	RPG	APG	SPG	BPG	PPG
Chucky Atkins*	18	0	16.6	.291	.250	.917	1.0	1.7	0.4	0.1	3.9
Nick Collison	71	40	25.8	.568	.000	.721	6.9	0.9	0.7	0.7	8.2
Kevin Durant	74	74	39.0	.476	.422	.863	6.5	2.8	1.3	0.7	25.3
Jeff Green	78	78	36.8	.446	.389	.788	6.7	2.0	1.0	0.4	16.5
Steven Hill	1	0	2.0	1.000	.000	.000	3.0	0.0	0.0	0.0	2.0
Nenad Krstić	46	29	24.8	.469	.000	.797	5.5	0.6	0.5	1.1	9.7
Shaun Livingston	8	1	23.8	.538	.000	1.000	3.3	2.0	0.6	0.3	7.8
Desmond Mason*	39	19	27.3	.435	.000	.541	4.0	1.2	0.4	0.8	7.5
Johan Petro*	22	12	15.5	.407	.000	.667	4.3	0.3	0.7	0.2	4.6
Malik Rose*	20	0	15.7	.378	.000	.800	3.3	1.3	0.5	0.1	5.0
Thabo Sefolosha*	23	22	31.1	.417	.243	.833	5.2	2.0	1.7	1.1	8.5
Mouhamed Sene*	5	0	4.6	.714	.000	.778	1.8	0.0	0.2	0.4	3.4
Joe Smith*	36	3	19.2	.454	.500	.704	4.5	0.7	0.3	0.7	6.6
Robert Swift	26	10	13.2	.521	.000	.750	3.4	0.3	0.2	0.7	3.3
Earl Watson	68	18	26.1	.384	.235	.755	2.7	5.8	0.7	0.2	6.6
Kyle Weaver	56	19	20.8	.459	.344	.707	2.3	1.8	0.8	0.4	5.3
Russell Westbrook	82	65	32.5	.398	.271	.815	4.9	5.3	1.3	0.2	15.3
D. J. White	7	0	18.6	.520	.000	.769	4.6	0.9	0.4	0.7	8.9
Chris Wilcox*	37	6	19.4	.485	.000	.598	5.3	0.9	0.5	0.3	8.4
Damien Wilkins	41	14	15.5	.362	.375	.804	1.7	0.9	0.5	0.2	5.3

* Statistics with Oklahoma City.

== Awards and records ==
=== Awards ===
==== Week/Month ====
- Russell Westbrook was named Western Conference rookie of the month in December and February.

==== All-Star ====
- Russell Westbrook, Jeff Green and Kevin Durant played in the Rookie Challenge, where Durant was named MVP.
- Kevin Durant won the H–O–R–S–E Competition.

==== Season ====
- Russell Westbrook was selected to the All-Rookie 1st team.

== Transactions ==
=== Overview ===
Players Added

Via draft

- Russell Westbrook

Via trade

- Desmond Mason
- Joe Smith
- Kyle Weaver
  (Draft rights)
- D.J. White
  (Draft rights)
Players Lost

Via trade

- Adrian Griffin
- Luke Ridnour

Via free agency

- Ronald Dupree
- Francisco Elson
- Mickaël Gelabale

Waived

- Donyell Marshall

=== Trades ===
July 5, 2008	To Seattle SuperSonics D.J. White	To Detroit Pistons Walter Sharpe; Trent Plaisted
August 11, 2008	To Oklahoma City Thunder Kyle Weaver	To Charlotte Bobcats 2009 second-round pick
August 13, 2008	To Oklahoma City Thunder Desmond Mason via MIL; Joe Smith via CLE	To Milwaukee Bucks Adrian Griffin via OKC; Luke Ridnour via OKC; Damon Jones via CLE
August 13, 2008	To Cleveland Cavaliers Mo Williams via MIL
January 7, 2009	To Oklahoma City Thunder Chucky Atkins; 2009 first-round pick	To Denver Nuggets Johan Petro; 2009 second-round pick
February 19, 2009	To Oklahoma City Thunder Thabo Sefolosha	To Chicago Bulls 2009 first-round pick
February 19, 2009	To Oklahoma City Thunder Malik Rose	To New York Knicks Chris Wilcox

=== Free agency ===
==== Re-signed ====
Date	Player	Contract
September 11, 2008	Robert Swift	Standard

==== Additions ====
Date	Player	Contract	Former team
November 4, 2008	Steven Hill	Standard	Arkansas Razorbacks
December 31, 2008	Nenad Krstic	Multi-Year Contract	New Jersey Nets; Triumph Lyubertsy
March 31, 2009	Shaun Livingston	Multi-Year Contract	Tulsa 66ers (D-League)

==== Subtractions ====
Date	Player	Reason left	New team
July 1, 2008	Mickaël Gelabale	Free Agency	Los Angeles D-Fenders (D-League)
August 20, 2008	Donyell Marshall	Waived	Philadelphia 76ers
September 9, 2008	Francisco Elson	Free Agency	Milwaukee Bucks
December 3, 2008	Ronald Dupree	Free Agency	Tulsa 66ers
December 30, 2008	Steven Hill	Waived	Tulsa 66ers (D-League)
February 19, 2009	Mouhamed Sene	Waived	Albuquerque Thunderbirds (D-League)

== See also ==
- Seattle SuperSonics relocation to Oklahoma City
- 2008–09 NBA season
