= Steven Hill (basketball) =

American basketball player (born 1985)

Personal information
- Born: November 14, 1985 (age 41) Chanute, Kansas, U.S.
- Listed height: 7 ft 0 in (2.13 m)
- Listed weight: 245 lb (111 kg)

Career information
- High school: Branson (Branson, Missouri)
- College: Arkansas (2004–2008)
- NBA draft: 2008: undrafted
- Playing career: 2008–2010
- Position: Power forward / center
- Number: 51

Career history
- 2008: Oklahoma City Thunder
- 2008–2010: Tulsa 66ers
- Stats at NBA.com
- Stats at Basketball Reference

Steven Hill (born November 14, 1985) is an American former professional basketball player. A 7-foot (2.1 m) center, he attended University of Arkansas.

== College career ==
In his freshman year, Hill started 18 of 30 games for the Arkansas Razorbacks and finished second in the Southeastern Conference with 1.8 blocks per game, also averaging 2.3 points and rebounds. The number of blocks achieved, 54, was second most for a freshman in Arkansas history, the leader being Oliver Miller with 60.

In his second year, Hill upped his numbers slightly, averaging 2.8 blocks in the process, good enough for second in the conference. His 91 blocks as a sophomore surpassed Miller's record of 85.

Hill received SEC Defensive Player of the Year accolades in his junior year, and improved his averages once again (6.2 points, 4.4 rebounds and 2.8 blocks), while his 93 made shots and 218 total points doubled his career totals entering the year. In blocked shots, Hill's total of 99 made him the first Razorback to get 90+ blocks in more than one year. In his senior year, his numbers decreased slightly.

== Professional career ==
After going undrafted in the 2008 NBA draft, Hill was signed by the Portland Trail Blazers in August 2008, but was waived in October, before the 2008–09 season began.

He was signed by the Oklahoma City Thunder on November 4, 2008, playing one game before being assigned to the Thunder's D-League affiliate Tulsa 66ers on November 21. On December 13, Hill was recalled by the Thunder, after averaging 9.6 points, 7.2 rebounds and 2.8 blocks in 25.6 minutes in five games for the 66ers. A week later, without playing an additional game, he was made expendable and subsequently waived by the Thunder to make room on their roster for newly signed 7'0" center Nenad Krstic.

He played with the Minnesota Timberwolves during the NBA 2009 Summer League and with the Sacramento Kings during the NBA 2010 Summer League.

In October 2010, Hill signed a training camp contract with the Portland Trail Blazers, but was waived prior to the regular season.

In 2015 Hill was inducted into the Missouri Sports Hall of Fame.

== Career statistics ==
Legend
GP	Games played	GS	Games started	MPG	Minutes per game
FG%	Field goal percentage	3P%	3-point field goal percentage	FT%	Free throw percentage
RPG	Rebounds per game	APG	Assists per game	SPG	Steals per game
BPG	Blocks per game	PPG	Points per game	**Bold**	Career high

=== NBA ===
==== Regular season ====
Year	Team	GP	GS	MPG	FG%	3P%	FT%	RPG	APG	SPG	BPG	PPG
2008–09	Oklahoma City	1	0	2.0	1.000	0.000	0.000	1.0	0.0	0.0	0.0	2.0
Career		1	0	2.0	1.000	0.000	0.000	1.0	0.0	0.0	0.0	2.0

=== College ===
Year	Team	GP	GS	MPG	FG%	3P%	FT%	RPG	APG	SPG	BPG	PPG
2004–05	Arkansas	30	18	15.7	.509	–	.462	2.3	0.2	0.5	1.8	2.3
2005–06	Arkansas	32	29	22.3	.473	–	.474	3.5	0.4	0.7	2.8	3.0
2006–07	Arkansas	35	31	23.5	.641	.000	.500	4.4	0.4	1.1	2.8	6.2
2007–08	Arkansas	35	28	16.3	.678	–	.588	2.9	0.3	0.5	2.1	4.2
Career		132	106	19.5	.589	.000	.519	3.3	0.3	0.7	2.4	4.0
