= Johan Petro =

French basketball player (born 1986)

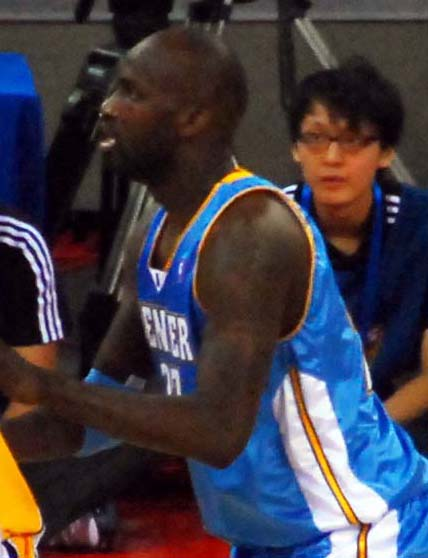
- Petro with the Denver Nuggets in 2009

Personal information
- Born: January 27, 1986 (age 40) Paris, France
- Listed height: 7 ft 0 in (2.13 m)
- Listed weight: 247 lb (112 kg)

Career information
- NBA draft: 2005: 1st round, 25th overall pick
- Drafted by: Seattle SuperSonics
- Playing career: 2003–2017
- Position: Center
- Number: 27, 10

Career history
- 2003–2005: Élan Béarnais Pau-Orthez
- 2005–2009: Seattle SuperSonics / Oklahoma City Thunder
- 2009–2010: Denver Nuggets
- 2010–2012: New Jersey Nets
- 2012–2013: Atlanta Hawks
- 2013–2014: Zhejiang Guangsha
- 2014: Limoges CSP
- 2015: Mets de Guaynabo
- 2016: Leones de Ponce
- 2016: Cangrejeros de Santurce
- 2017: Sioux Falls Skyforce

Career highlights
- 2× Pro A champion (2004, 2014)
- Stats at NBA.com
- Stats at Basketball Reference
Medals
Men's Basketball
Representing France
FIBA EuroBasket
Gold medal – first place	2013 Slovenia

Johan Petro (born January 27, 1986) is a French former professional basketball player of Guadeloupean descent. He was selected by the Seattle SuperSonics with the 25th overall pick in the 2005 NBA draft.

He was a key member of the French junior national team and played at the INSEP. In 2004, he won the French League title with Pau-Orthez. Petro has also represented the French national basketball team.

== Professional career ==
=== Seattle SuperSonics (2005–2009) ===
Petro was selected with the 25th pick of the first round of the 2005 NBA draft by the Seattle SuperSonics.

On March 30, 2007, Petro dropped a career high 22 points in a 120–93 victory over the Memphis Grizzlies.

On March 5, 2008, Petro grabbed a career high 15 rebounds in a 106–118 loss to the Milwaukee Bucks.

Unfortunately, the SuperSonics were not successful during this era as it was a stage of rebuilding the team after superstar Ray Allen left the team in 2007. Petro failed to make the playoffs with the SuperSonics, who later relocated to Oklahoma City and became the Oklahoma City Thunder in Petro's final season with the team during the 2008-2009 season.

=== Denver Nuggets (2009–2010) ===
On January 7, 2009, Petro was traded to the Denver Nuggets along with a 2009 second round pick in exchange for guard Chucky Atkins, a conditional 2009 first-round pick and cash considerations. The Nuggets declined Petro's team option, making him an unrestricted free agent. However, they resigned him on August 27, 2009. Petro was able to find team success with the Nuggets as Denver made the playoffs in 2009 and 2010 respectively. In the 2009 playoffs the Nuggets made it far, defeating the New Orleans Hornets and Dallas Mavericks in 5 games each in the first and second round, reaching the Western Conference Finals for the first time since 1985. They faced the Los Angeles Lakers led by Kobe Bryant, and fell to the Lakers in 6 games. That was the farthest Petro reached in the playoffs in his NBA career. The Nuggets reached the playoffs again in 2010 however they were disappointingly defeated in the first round by the Utah Jazz.

=== New Jersey Nets (2010–2012) ===
On July 10, 2010, the New Jersey Nets signed Petro to a three-year deal worth $10 million, reported by Yahoo! Sports. Unfortunately the Nets were also facing a rebuild era just like with the SuperSonics/Thunder in the late 2000s, so Petro didn't reach the playoffs with the team.

On April 26, 2012, Petro scored the final ever points of the New Jersey Nets against the Toronto Raptors at Air Canada Centre.

=== Atlanta Hawks (2012–2013) ===
On July 11, 2012, the Nets traded Petro, Jordan Farmar, Jordan Williams, Anthony Morrow, and DeShawn Stevenson to the Atlanta Hawks for Joe Johnson.

=== 2013–present ===
In August 2013, he agreed to a one-year deal with Zhejiang Guangsha. He left them in January 2014.

In February 2014, he returned to France and signed with Limoges CSP. In June 2014, Petro announced that he would halt his career indefinitely to seek treatment for his back in Florida.

On January 28, 2015, Petro signed with Mets de Guaynabo of the Baloncesto Superior Nacional. On April 14, 2015, he was cut by the Puerto Rican club.

On February 2, 2016, he signed with Leones de Ponce. On February 24, 2017, Petro signed with the Sioux Falls Skyforce of the NBA Development League. On March 23, 2017, he was waived by the Skyforce.

== National team career ==
Petro played with the senior men's French national basketball team at the 2006 FIBA World Championship. With France, he won the gold medal at the 2013 EuroBasket.

== NBA career statistics ==
Legend
GP	Games played	GS	Games started	MPG	Minutes per game
FG%	Field goal percentage	3P%	3-point field goal percentage	FT%	Free throw percentage
RPG	Rebounds per game	APG	Assists per game	SPG	Steals per game
BPG	Blocks per game	PPG	Points per game	**Bold**	Career high

=== Regular season ===
Year	Team	GP	GS	MPG	FG%	3P%	FT%	RPG	APG	SPG	BPG	PPG
2005–06	Seattle	68	**41**	**18.9**	.510	.000	.627	4.4	.2	.4	**.8**	5.2
2006–07	Seattle	**81**	13	18.6	.516	.000	.649	4.1	.6	.5	.6	**6.2**
2007–08	Seattle	72	28	18.2	.419	.000	.736	**5.1**	.4	.5	.6	6.0
2008–09	Oklahoma City	22	12	18.2	.407	.000	.667	4.3	.3	**.7**	.2	4.6
2008–09	Denver	27	10	8.1	.429	.000	.429	2.3	.4	.1	.4	2.2
2009–10	Denver	36	16	12.1	**.535**	.000	.667	3.6	.4	.3	.4	3.4
2010–11	New Jersey	77	1	11.6	.445	.000	.536	2.8	.6	.4	.4	3.5
2011–12	New Jersey	59	10	15.6	.419	**1.000**	.838	3.8	**.8**	.4	.4	4.2
2012–13	Atlanta	31	8	11.4	.436	.250	**.917**	3.6	.5	.3	.3	3.5
Career		473	139	15.4	.462	.154	.678	3.9	.5	.4	.5	4.7

=== Playoffs ===
Year	Team	GP	GS	MPG	FG%	3P%	FT%	RPG	APG	SPG	BPG	PPG
2009	Denver	**10**	0	2.6	.222	.000	**.625**	.6	.1	.0	.1	.9
2010	Denver	6	1	7.5	**.545**	.000	.500	1.8	.2	**.2**	.5	2.2
2013	Atlanta	6	**4**	**16.8**	.519	.000	.500	**3.7**	**.7**	**.2**	**.7**	**4.8**
Career		22	5	7.8	.468	.000	.583	1.8	.3	.1	.4	2.3

=== International stats ===
Tournament	Games played	Points per game	Rebounds per game	Assists per game
2006 FIBA World Championship	7	3.6	2.1	0.7
2013 EuroBasket	10	3.5	2.3	0.2

== See also ==
- List of French NBA players
- List of European basketball players in the United States
