= Chris Andersen =

American basketball player (born 1978)

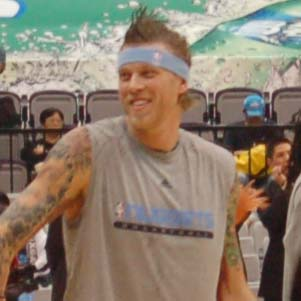
- Andersen with the Denver Nuggets in 2009

Personal information
- Born: July 7, 1978 (age 48) Long Beach, California, U.S.
- Listed height: 6 ft 10 in (2.08 m)
- Listed weight: 245 lb (111 kg)

Career information
- High school: Iola (Iola, Texas)
- College: Blinn (1997–1999)
- NBA draft: 2000: undrafted
- Playing career: 1999–2017
- Position: Center / power forward
- Number: 15, 11, 1, 12, 7, 00

Career history
- 1999–2000: Jiangsu Dragons
- 2000: New Mexico Slam
- 2000–2001: Fargo-Moorhead Beez
- 2001: Sugarland Sharks
- 2001: Fayetteville Patriots
- 2001–2004: Denver Nuggets
- 2004–2006, 2008: New Orleans Hornets (Note: During the 2005–06 and 2006–07 seasons, the team was known as the New Orleans/Oklahoma City Hornets during their temporary relocation to Oklahoma City due to Hurricane Katrina.)
- 2008–2012: Denver Nuggets
- 2013–2016: Miami Heat
- 2016: Memphis Grizzlies
- 2016–2017: Cleveland Cavaliers

Career highlights
- NBA champion (2013)

Career statistics
- Points: 3,755 (5.4 ppg)
- Rebounds: 3,493 (5.0 rpg)
- Blocks: 991 (1.4 bpg)
- Stats at NBA.com
- Stats at Basketball Reference

Christopher Claus Andersen (born July 7, 1978) is an American former professional basketball player. Nicknamed "Birdman" for his wingspan and blocking prowess, Andersen was born in Long Beach, California, grew up in Iola, Texas, and played one year at Blinn College. Andersen began his professional career in the Chinese Basketball Association and the American minor leagues.

After getting called up to play in the National Basketball Association (NBA) from the NBA D-League, Andersen would go on to play for the Denver Nuggets and New Orleans Hornets. He received a two-year ban from the NBA in 2006 for violating the league's drug policy, but was reinstated on March 4, 2008, and re-signed with the Hornets the next day. He returned to Denver later in 2008, and remained with the team until 2012.

Andersen signed with the Miami Heat in January 2013 and won a championship with them that same year. He and Oliver Lafayette are the only Blinn students to ever play in the NBA. He most recently played for the Dallas Power in the Big3 league, helping them win the 2018 Big3 championship.

== Early life ==
Andersen is the second of the three children of corrections officer and Danish immigrant Claus Andersen and Linda Holubec, a Tennessee native who worked as a waitress at the Port Hueneme naval base and played basketball in high school. In 1982, when Andersen was four, his family moved to Texas, using a loan from the Texas Veterans Land Board to purchase a 10-acre plot in unincorporated Iola, about 100 miles northwest of Houston. The Andersens then lived off the land, with Linda working in low-end jobs and relying on the help of neighbors and Linda's brother, who was a Navy supply boat captain. During Andersen's middle school years, he and his siblings were sent to a group home in Dallas for three years.

== College career ==
As a teenager, Andersen was convinced to take up basketball by the varsity basketball coach at Iola High School, Robert Stewart, who said the sport could give him a chance at a college scholarship. He was heavily recruited by the Texas A&M Aggies but did not have the necessary grades. Andersen instead signed an athletic scholarship to attend Blinn College in Brenham, where Stewart's father, Ernest, once served as athletic director. Andersen averaged 9 points, 7 rebounds and 7 blocks per game during the 1997–98 season. He led the National Junior College Athletic Association in blocks.

On October 9, 1998, Andersen committed to play for the Houston Cougars. During the fall semester at Blinn in 1998, he averaged 20 points, 10 rebounds and about 7 blocks per game. On January 8, 1999, Andersen left the Blinn basketball team to concentrate on his academics so he could meet eligibility standards. In May 1999, the Cougars announced that Andersen would not be eligible to play next season for academic reasons.

== Professional career ==
=== Jiangsu Dragons (1999–2000) ===
Convinced that he could play professionally, Andersen's high school coach arranged for him to play a series of exhibition games with the semi-professional Texas Ambassadors, and a game in China led Andersen to get an offer to join the Jiangsu Dragons of the Chinese Basketball Association.

=== New Mexico Slam (2000) ===
In March 2000, Andersen joined the New Mexico Slam of the International Basketball League where he averaged just 1.1 points and 1.6 rebounds in six regular-season games and four playoff games.

=== Fargo-Moorhead Beez (2000–2001) ===
Later that year, Andersen joined the Dakota Wizards of the International Basketball Association (IBA), but left before the season started. He then joined the Fargo-Moorhead Beez also of the IBA where he averaged 3.7 points, 2.9 rebounds, and 1.6 blocks in seven games before being released in January 2001.

=== Sugarland Sharks (2001) ===
After his stint in the IBA, Andersen joined the Sugarland Sharks of the Southwest Basketball League later on in 2001.

=== Fayetteville Patriots (2001) ===
In July 2001, Andersen joined the Cleveland Cavaliers for the 2001 NBA Summer League. On September 28, 2001, he signed with the Phoenix Suns. However, he was later waived by the Suns on October 7, 2001. On October 31, 2001, he was selected with the first overall pick by the Fayetteville Patriots in the National Basketball Development League's inaugural draft. Andersen averaged 4.7 points, 3.7 rebounds, and 1.7 blocks in just three games.

=== Denver Nuggets (2001–2004) ===
Andersen became the first D-League player called up by an NBA team, signing with the Denver Nuggets on November 21, 2001, after just two games for Fayetteville. He quickly became one of the top per-minute rebounders and shot-blockers in the league. During the 2002 Rocky Mountain Revue, teammates Junior Harrington and Kenny Satterfield nicknamed Andersen "Birdman" for his arm span and penchant for aerial acrobatics.

On September 29, 2003, he re-signed with the Nuggets.

=== New Orleans Hornets (2004–2006) ===
On July 19, 2004, Andersen signed a multi-year deal with the New Orleans Hornets. He appeared in the NBA Slam Dunk Contest during the 2005 All-Star Weekend for the second year in a row, where he unsuccessfully tried the same dunk eight times at Ball Arena.

Following the effects of Hurricane Katrina in August 2005, the Hornets moved to Oklahoma City for the 2005–06 season and temporarily became the New Orleans/Oklahoma City Hornets. In 2005–06, Andersen managed just 32 games (two starts), averaging 5.0 points and 4.8 rebounds per game.

=== Expulsion and reinstatement ===
On January 25, 2006, Andersen was disqualified from the NBA for violating the league's anti-drug policy by testing positive for a banned substance. Andersen's suspension fell under the league's category of "drugs of abuse", violation of which is possible grounds for expulsion from the NBA under the league's collective bargaining agreement. Andersen attempted to appeal the ruling through arbitration, but the arbitrator ruled to uphold his dismissal in March 2006. As Andersen waited for his reinstatement, effective January 2008, he was helped by a lawyer friend in Denver, Mark Bryant, who became his adviser. Andersen spent a month in a rehab clinic in Malibu, worked out and coached a boys' basketball team in Denver.

On March 4, 2008, the NBA Players Association granted Andersen's request to be reinstated as an NBA player. The reinstatement was effective immediately, and the rights to his services belonged to his former team, the New Orleans Hornets, who re-signed him on March 5, 2008, for the rest of the 2007–08 season.

=== Return to Denver (2008–2012) ===
On July 24, 2008, Andersen signed a one-year deal with the Denver Nuggets. Andersen finished the 2008–09 season second in the league in blocks per game with 2.5 despite playing only 20.6 minutes per game.

On July 8, 2009, Andersen re-signed with the Nuggets on a five-year deal.

On July 17, 2012, the Nuggets waived Andersen via the amnesty clause. Nuggets general manager Masai Ujiri, a friend of Andersen's, reluctantly made the transaction in order to remove $9 million from the team's payroll cap to avoid the luxury tax.

=== Miami Heat (2013–2016) ===
Before he was waived by the Nuggets, Miami Heat head coach Erik Spoelstra had repeatedly lobbied Pat Riley to acquire Andersen.

On January 20, 2013, Andersen signed a 10-day contract with the Miami Heat. He was signed to a second 10-day contract on January 30, and signed for the remainder of the season on February 8, 2013. Andersen played in only 42 games during the 2012–13 season but still contributed to the Heat's success by putting up 4.9 points per game, 4.1 rebounds, and 1 block on 57.7 FG% in 14.9 minutes of play. After he joined the Heat, his team went on a 27-game winning streak, overall going 37–3 in regular-season games in which Andersen played. Andersen also gained legions of fans inspired by his head-to-toe tattoos, Mohawk haircut, and trademark hustle.

Andersen shot 15–15 in Games 1–5 against the Indiana Pacers in the Eastern Conference Finals, including a 7-for-7 performance in Game 1 that set a franchise playoff record, besting the 6-for-6 mark by Alonzo Mourning in 2007. Andersen was suspended for Game 6 of the 2013 Eastern Conference Finals without pay for committing a flagrant foul on Tyler Hansbrough in Game 5.

At age 34, he reached the NBA Finals for the first time in his career. Against the San Antonio Spurs in the deciding Game 7 of the 2013 NBA Finals, Andersen recorded three points, four rebounds, and a block en route to his first NBA championship. With a field goal percentage of 80.7%, Andersen finished the 2013 NBA Playoffs with an NBA Playoffs record for the highest field goal percentage.

On July 10, 2013, Andersen re-signed with the Miami Heat. He played 72 games during the 2013–14 regular season, averaging 6.6 points, 5.3 rebounds and 1.3 blocks per game. On May 26, 2014, before Game 4 of the Eastern Conference Finals, it was announced that Andersen would miss Game 4 and subsequently Game 5 due to an array of nagging aches and pains which he had been suffering for some time. Andersen returned for Game 6, recording 9 points and 10 rebounds as the Heat went on to advance to their fourth straight NBA Finals and Andersen's second. The Heat again faced the Spurs in the 2014 NBA Finals but were defeated in five games.

On July 19, 2014, Andersen again re-signed with the Heat. Over the course of the 2014–15 regular season, Andersen started 20 games, the most in a single season of his career, averaging 5.3 points per game, 5.0 rebounds, and 1 block on 58.0 FG% in 18.9 minutes of play.

=== Memphis Grizzlies (2016) ===
On February 16, 2016, the Heat traded Andersen and two second-round picks to the Memphis Grizzlies in a three-team trade also involving the Charlotte Hornets. Three days later, he made his debut for the Grizzlies in a 109–104 win over the Minnesota Timberwolves, recording four points, three rebounds and one block in 11 minutes. In what would be the final postseason of his career, Andersen made his first career playoff start in a first round sweep at the hands of the San Antonio Spurs.

=== Cleveland Cavaliers (2016–2017) ===
On July 22, 2016, Andersen signed with the Cleveland Cavaliers. On December 16, 2016, he was ruled out for the rest of the season after suffering an ACL tear that required season-ending surgery.

On February 13, 2017, the Cavaliers traded Andersen and cash considerations to the Charlotte Hornets in exchange for a 2017 protected second-round pick. He was immediately waived by the Hornets upon being acquired.

== Big3 career ==
On March 23, 2018, Andersen was reported to have signed a contract with the Big3 to join the draft pool, making Andersen draft eligible in the Big3.

He was selected in the 2018 Big3 draft by the Dallas Power, and helped them win the 2018 Big3 championship.

== Personal life ==
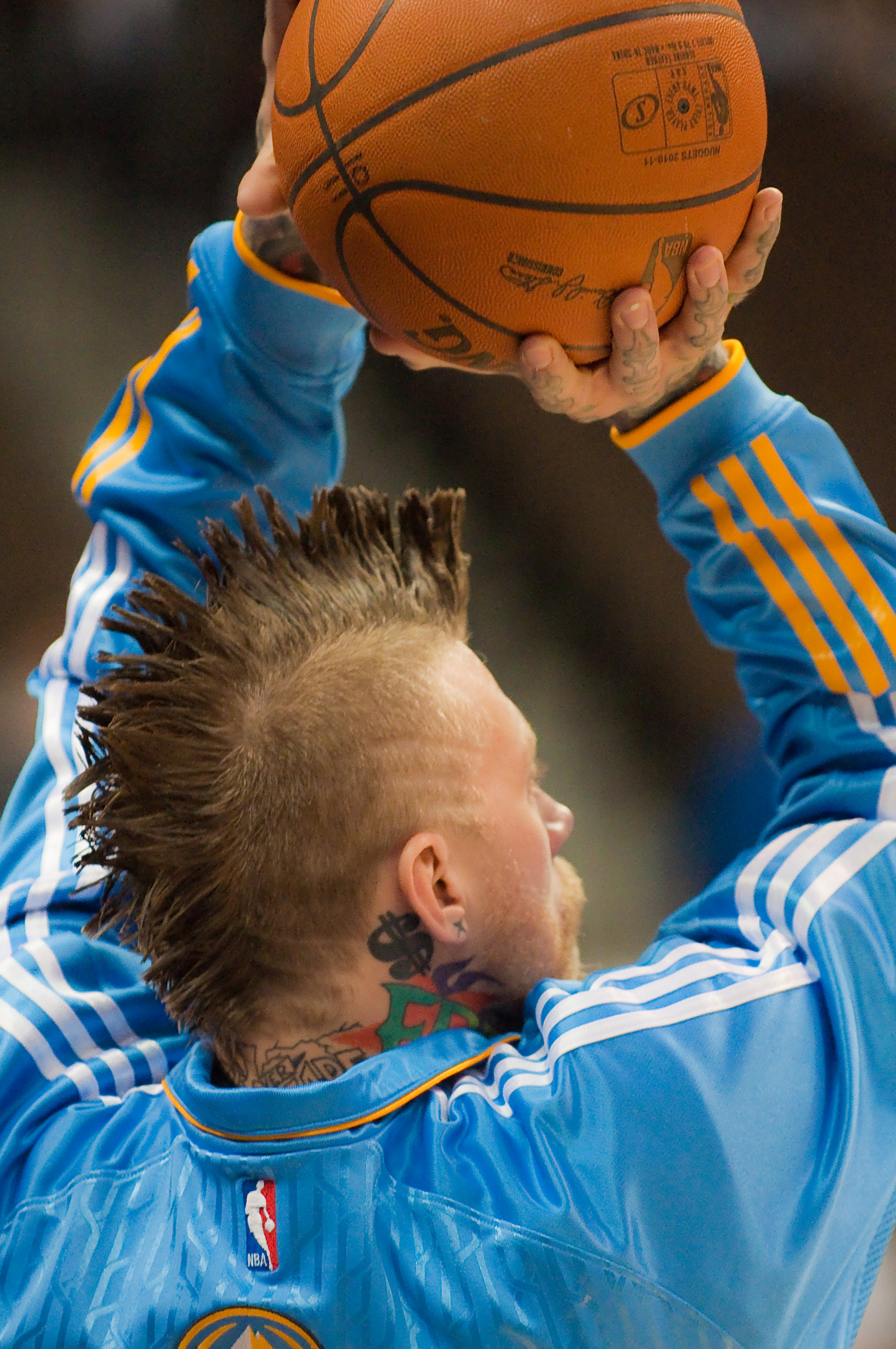
Andersen sporting a mohawk hairstyle and neck tattoos in 2011

Andersen is known for brightly colored tattoos on his arms, chest, neck, hands, and legs. His first tattoo was given as an eighteenth birthday gift by his mother, who has some of her own from her days associating with the Bandidos Motorcycle Club. Andersen's regular tattoo artist, Denver-based John Slaughter, estimates he has inked 65 percent of Andersen’s body. Andersen showed off those tattoos in PETA's "Ink Not Mink" ad campaign to protest the fur industry.

On May 10, 2012, Denver NBC affiliate KUSA reported that Andersen's home was the target of an investigation of a suspected internet criminal case by the Douglas County Sheriff's Office Internet Crimes Against Children Unit. Andersen was not charged with any crimes. In September 2013, it was revealed that Andersen, along with Internet model Paris Dunn, were victims of an elaborate catfishing hoax, orchestrated by Canadian woman Shelly Chartier in Easterville, Manitoba. The story was covered by ABC News' 20/20 and MTV's Catfish: The TV Show.

== NBA career statistics ==
Legend
| GP | Games played | GS | Games started | MPG | Minutes per game |
| FG% | Field goal percentage | 3P% | 3-point field goal percentage | FT% | Free throw percentage |
| RPG | Rebounds per game | APG | Assists per game | SPG | Steals per game |
| BPG | Blocks per game | PPG | Points per game | **Bold** | Career high |
| † | Won an NBA championship |

=== Regular season ===
| Year | Team | GP | GS | MPG | FG% | 3P% | FT% | RPG | APG | SPG | BPG | PPG |
|---|---|---|---|---|---|---|---|---|---|---|---|---|
| 2001–02 | Denver | 24 | 1 | 10.9 | .338 | .000 | **.786** | 3.2 | .3 | .3 | 1.2 | 3.0 |
| 2002–03 | Denver | 59 | 3 | 15.4 | .400 | .000 | .550 | 4.6 | .5 | .5 | 1.0 | 5.2 |
| 2003–04 | Denver | 71 | 0 | 14.5 | .443 | .000 | .589 | 4.2 | .5 | .5 | 1.6 | 3.4 |
| 2004–05 | New Orleans | 67 | 2 | 21.3 | .534 | .000 | .689 | 6.1 | **1.1** | .2 | 1.5 | **7.7** |
| 2005–06 | New Orleans | 32 | 2 | 17.8 | .571 | – | .476 | 4.8 | .2 | .3 | 1.3 | 5.0 |
| 2007–08 | New Orleans | 5 | 0 | 6.8 | .286 | – | .500 | 1.8 | .0 | .0 | .8 | 1.2 |
| 2008–09 | Denver | 71 | 1 | 20.6 | .548 | .200 | .718 | 6.2 | .4 | **.6** | **2.5** | 6.4 |
| 2009–10 | Denver | **76** | 0 | **22.3** | .566 | .000 | .695 | **6.4** | .4 | **.6** | 1.9 | 5.9 |
| 2010–11 | Denver | 45 | 0 | 16.3 | .599 | .000 | .637 | 4.9 | .4 | .5 | 1.3 | 5.6 |
| 2011–12 | Denver | 32 | 1 | 15.2 | .546 | – | .610 | 4.6 | .2 | **.6** | 1.4 | 5.3 |
| 2012–13† | Miami | 42 | 0 | 14.9 | .577 | **.667** | .677 | 4.1 | .4 | .4 | 1.0 | 4.9 |
| 2013–14 | Miami | 72 | 0 | 19.4 | **.664** | .250 | .710 | 5.3 | .3 | .4 | 1.3 | 6.6 |
| 2014–15 | Miami | 60 | **20** | 18.9 | .580 | .308 | .667 | 5.0 | .7 | .4 | 1.0 | 5.3 |
| 2015–16 | Miami | 7 | 1 | 5.1 | .400 | .400 | .750 | 1.3 | .4 | .1 | .4 | 1.9 |
| 2015–16 | Memphis | 20 | 14 | 18.3 | .548 | .222 | .688 | 4.5 | .5 | .7 | .5 | 4.6 |
| 2016–17 | Cleveland | 12 | 0 | 9.5 | .409 | .000 | .714 | 2.6 | .4 | .4 | .6 | 2.3 |
| Career | | 695 | 45 | 17.7 | .532 | .221 | .654 | 5.0 | .5 | .4 | 1.4 | 5.4 |

=== Playoffs ===
| Year | Team | GP | GS | MPG | FG% | 3P% | FT% | RPG | APG | SPG | BPG | PPG |
|---|---|---|---|---|---|---|---|---|---|---|---|---|
| 2004 | Denver | 5 | 0 | 6.8 | .333 | – | .000 | 2.8 | .4 | .2 | .4 | 1.2 |
| 2009 | Denver | 15 | 0 | **21.9** | .630 | .000 | .659 | 6.3 | .6 | .3 | **2.1** | **6.5** |
| 2010 | Denver | 6 | 0 | 19.3 | .529 | – | .643 | 4.5 | .2 | .2 | 1.0 | 4.5 |
| 2011 | Denver | 5 | 0 | 14.6 | .636 | – | .714 | 2.8 | .6 | **.6** | 1.4 | 4.8 |
| 2013† | Miami | **20** | 0 | 15.2 | **.807** | – | **.735** | 3.8 | .2 | .5 | 1.1 | 6.4 |
| 2014 | Miami | 18 | 0 | 17.6 | .579 | .000 | .684 | 5.9 | .3 | .3 | 1.0 | 5.1 |
| 2016 | Memphis | 4 | **2** | 19.8 | .417 | – | .625 | **7.8** | **.8** | .5 | .8 | 3.8 |
| Career | | 73 | 2 | 17.1 | .631 | .000 | .689 | 5.0 | .4 | .4 | 1.2 | 5.3 |

== See also ==
- List of doping cases in sport
- List of people banned or suspended by the NBA
