= Mark Warkentien =

Basketball executive (1953–2022)

Mark Warkentien (April 16, 1953 – December 23, 2022) was a basketball coach and executive whose most recent job was as a special assignment evaluator for the Oklahoma City Thunder. He recently served as the New York Knicks' director of player personnel. He was also the former vice president of basketball operations for the Denver Nuggets, where he won the NBA Executive of the Year Award for the 2008–09 NBA season.

== Career ==
Warkentien coached several Southern California college basketball teams before joining Jerry Tarkanian's coaching staff as an assistant at UNLV. He later left the bench to serve as assistant athletic director for the program.

His NBA career began in 1991 with the former Seattle SuperSonics, where he spent three years as a scout.

Warkentien then worked for the Portland Trail Blazers for ten seasons. During his time in Portland, Warkentien held several positions, including scout, assistant general manager, and director of player personnel.

He then joined the Cleveland Cavaliers front office as director of player personnel and became the interim GM for the latter half of the 2004-05 season.

Warkentien was elevated to vice president of basketball operations of the Denver Nuggets in 2006, replacing the released Kiki Vandeweghe shortly after the season ended. During his time in Denver he made two blockbuster deals, one involving the Philadelphia 76ers which sent Andre Miller to Philadelphia for Allen Iverson, and the second transaction sending Iverson to Detroit to return Denver native Chauncey Billups home.

He won the NBA Executive of the Year Award for the 2008–09 NBA season. His transactions included sending Allen Iverson to the Detroit Pistons for Chauncey Billups, and signing free-agent Chris Andersen, while moving the Nuggets under the luxury tax threshold at the same time.

On August 3, 2010, the Nuggets declined to extend Warkentien's contract, ending his four-year association with the team.

On January 30, 2011, the New York Knicks agreed to hire Warkentien as a high-level consultant. On February 5, 2011, they named him Director of Pro Player Personnel.

Soon after in 2012, Warkentien became a "Basketball GM and Scouting" instructor for the online sports-career training school Sports Management Worldwide.

Per his LinkedIn profile, Warkentien last served under the title of Special Assignment Evaluator for the Oklahoma City Thunder.

== Personal life ==
Warkentien graduated from Cal State Fullerton as a part of the school's 1976 graduating class. He earned a master's degree in sports leadership from Concordia University Chicago.

Warkentien had 2 daughters, Kreigh Dannette and Aubrie Jane. Aubrie was the director of basketball operations for the University of Nevada, where she was responsible for the day-to-day operations of the men's basketball office as well as assisting with its operations, recruiting and team travel budgets. Aubrie previously worked for the NBA Summer League and many NBA G-League Affiliate teams. Kreigh served as the chief of staff for the Washington men's basketball program under coach Mike Hopkins. Prior to joining UW, she was the assistant athletic director at the University of Nevada, Las Vegas, the same school where her dad coached before joining the NBA. She previously served as the director of basketball operations for the university's men's basketball team.

Warkentien died on December 23, 2022, aged 69.
