= 2008–09 Los Angeles Lakers season =

Season of the team the Los Angeles Lakers

- NBA champions
- Conference champions
- Division champions
- Head coach: Phil Jackson
- President: Jim Buss (vice)
- General manager: Mitch Kupchak
- Owner: Jerry Buss
- Arena: Staples Center

Results
- Record: 65–17 (.793)
- Place: Division: 1st (Pacific); Conference: 1st (Western)
- Playoff finish: NBA champions (Defeated Magic 4–1)
- Stats at Basketball Reference

Local media
- Television: Home: FS West HD Away: KCAL 9 HD
- Radio: AM 570 KLAC

The 2008–09 Los Angeles Lakers season was the franchise's 61st season, 60th in the National Basketball Association (NBA) and 49th in Los Angeles. Coming off an appearance in the 2008 NBA Finals, the Lakers won their division for the 31st time and appeared in the NBA Finals for the 30th time. With 65 wins, they tied the 1986–87 team for the third most wins in franchise history, the most since 1999–2000, and improved on their 2007–08 record by eight wins. The Lakers sold out all 41 home games for the season, led the NBA in money earned from overall ticket sales, and had the 5th highest increase in gate receipts from the previous season. The Lakers had the third best team offensive rating in the NBA.

Kobe Bryant and Pau Gasol were both selected for the 2009 NBA All-Star Game in Phoenix, with head coach Phil Jackson coaching the Western Conference, and with Bryant winning his third All-Star Game MVP award. Bryant finished second in league MVP voting, averaging 26.8 points, 5.2 rebounds, 4.9 assists and 1.5 steals per game. In addition, Gasol averaged 18.9 points, 9.6 rebounds, 3.5 assists and 1 block per game. Bryant was named both First Team All-NBA and First Team All-Defense, while Gasol was both named to the All-NBA Third Team. Phil Jackson reached 1,000 career wins on December 25, 2008, against the Boston Celtics. With 1,423 games coached, he became the fastest coach in NBA history to reach 1,000 wins, surpassing former Lakers coach Pat Riley.

In the playoffs, the Lakers defeated the Utah Jazz in five games in the First Round, then defeated the Houston Rockets in a hard-fought seven games in the Semifinals, and on May 29, the Lakers defeated the Denver Nuggets in the Western Conference Finals to advance to the NBA Finals for the second consecutive year and 30th time in franchise history, extending their NBA record for most Finals appearances. On June 14, the Los Angeles Lakers defeated the Dwight Howard-led Orlando Magic 4–1 in the best of seven series to become the 2009 NBA champions, winning their first championship in seven years, their tenth title in Los Angeles, and the 15th overall in franchise history. Kobe Bryant was awarded the 2009 NBA Finals MVP. Following the season, Trevor Ariza signed as a free agent with the Houston Rockets.

On July 15, 2009, the Los Angeles Lakers won the 2009 ESPY Awards for Best Team and Best Coach/Manager for Phil Jackson.

== Key dates ==
- June 26: The 2008 NBA draft took place in New York City.
- July 1: The free agency period started.
- October 7: The Lakers pre-season started with a game against the Utah Jazz.
- October 28: The Lakers won their season opener against the Portland Trail Blazers at Staples Center.
- December 8: With a 17–2 season start, the Lakers tied their record for best opening in franchise history.
- December 25: The Lakers avenged their 2008 NBA Finals loss with a 92–83 win over the Boston Celtics, ending Boston's 19-game winning streak.
- February 2: Kobe Bryant scored 61 points, the most ever scored at Madison Square Garden.
- February 8: The Lakers ended the Cavaliers 23-game home winning streak. The Lakers also became the first team in NBA history to win back-to-back games on the road (Boston and Cleveland), against teams with .800-plus win percentage at least 40 games into the season. Cleveland's loss to L.A. was one of only three games they lost at home all season, including the playoffs.
- February 14–15: 2009 NBA All-Star Weekend took place.
- March 12: The Lakers clinched the Pacific Division title with a win over the San Antonio Spurs.
- March 26: The Lakers matched last season's win total (57) with 11 games remaining with a win over the Detroit Pistons.
- March 27: The Lakers clinched the top record in the Western Conference with a win against the New Jersey Nets for their 58th win.
- April 14: The Lakers ended their regular season with a 125–112 victory over the Utah Jazz, becoming the third-winningest team in franchise history with 65 wins.
- April 19: The Lakers played their first playoff game of the season against the Utah Jazz.
- April 27: The Lakers won their Western Conference First Round series 4–1 over the Utah Jazz, advancing to the Conference Semi-Finals.
- May 17: The Lakers defeated the Houston Rockets in Game 7 of the Western Conference Semi-Finals and advance to the Western Conference Finals.
- May 29: The Lakers defeated the Denver Nuggets in Game 6 of the Western Conference Finals and advance to the 2009 NBA Finals.
- June 14: The Lakers defeated the Orlando Magic in Game 5 of 2009 NBA Finals, winning their 15th championship in franchise history.

== Offseason ==
=== Injuries ===
Following the 2007–08 NBA season, the Lakers faced two key injuries in the offseason. Andrew Bynum, who missed the second half of the season and playoffs was rehabilitating and working on conditioning. Trevor Ariza, who also missed the second half of the season, but later returned in the playoffs also had to work back into shape. Both players played on opening day. During the 2007–08 season, Kobe Bryant suffered a tear in his right pinkie finger. At the time, Bryant decided to forgo surgery and play out the rest of the season and participate in the 2008 Summer Olympics in Beijing. He eventually chose not to have surgery and let the hand heal naturally.

=== Departures ===
The most notable departure was last year's backup power forward Ronny Turiaf to the Golden State Warriors. As a restricted free agent, the Lakers were allowed to match any offer that another team gave Turiaf. The Lakers chose not to match the 4 year $17 million offer the Warriors gave.

Ira Newble, who the Lakers picked up midway through the 2007–08 season, was not re-signed and remained a free agent for the rest of the season. Coby Karl was also cut from the roster with Sun Yue replacing him.

=== Signings ===
Sasha Vujacic was the first member of the Lakers to sign a contract with the team in the offseason. Still, contract negotiations dragged on longer than usual because he wasn't signed to a tender offer from another team as a restricted free agent. Vujacic considered playing in Europe, but ultimately signed a 3-year contract worth $15 million with the Lakers.

Andrew Bynum, who is signed for the 2008–09 season, signed a 4-year contract extension for $57.4 million.

DJ Mbenga re-signed with the team for one year for approximately $850,000. Josh Powell was also signed to a one-year contract to replace the departed Ronny Turiaf The Lakers 2007 NBA draft pick Sun Yue, spent the entire 07–08 season playing for the Beijing Olympians in the ABA. He also played for China in the 2008 Summer Olympics. In the offseason the Lakers signed him to a 2-year deal.

Joe Crawford, C.J. Giles, Brandon Heath, and Dwayne Mitchell signed to the Lakers roster during the offseason but were all released before the season began.

=== Draft picks ===
Due to the midseason trade for Pau Gasol in February 2008, the Lakers only had a second-round draft pick in 2008. With it they selected Joe Crawford from Kentucky. He signed with the Lakers on August 27, 2008, but was waived October 22, during the 2008–09 pre-season.

Round	Pick	Player	Position	Nationality	College
2	58	Joe Crawford	Shooting guard	United States	Kentucky

== Trades ==
On February 7, Vladimir Radmanović was traded to the Charlotte Bobcats in return for Adam Morrison and Shannon Brown. The deal was made largely to save money to be able to resign players during the off-season, notably Lamar Odom and Trevor Ariza.

On February 18, backup center Chris Mihm was traded to the Memphis Grizzlies for a conditional second-round draft pick in 2013. The trade saves the Lakers approximately $2 million in salary and luxury tax money.

== Roster ==
2008–09 Los Angeles Lakers roster
Players

Pos.	No.	Player	Height	Weight	DOB	From
SF	3	Trevor Ariza	6 ft 8 in (2.03 m)	210 lb (95 kg)	1985-06-30	UCLA
SG	12	Shannon Brown	6 ft 4 in (1.93 m)	211 lb (96 kg)	1985-11-29	Michigan State
SG	24	Kobe Bryant	6 ft 6 in (1.98 m)	205 lb (93 kg)	1978-08-23	Lower Merion HS (PA)
C	17	Andrew Bynum	7 ft 0 in (2.13 m)	285 lb (129 kg)	1987-10-27	St. Joseph HS (NJ)
PG	5	Jordan Farmar	6 ft 2 in (1.88 m)	180 lb (82 kg)	1986-11-30	UCLA
PG	2	Derek Fisher	6 ft 1 in (1.85 m)	201 lb (91 kg)	1974-08-09	Little Rock
F/C	16	Pau Gasol	7 ft 0 in (2.13 m)	250 lb (113 kg)	1980-07-06	Spain
C	28	D. J. Mbenga	7 ft 0 in (2.13 m)	255 lb (116 kg)	1980-12-30	DR Congo
SF	6	Adam Morrison	6 ft 8 in (2.03 m)	205 lb (93 kg)	1984-07-19	Gonzaga
PF	7	Lamar Odom	6 ft 10 in (2.08 m)	230 lb (104 kg)	1979-11-06	Rhode Island
PF	21	Josh Powell	6 ft 9 in (2.06 m)	240 lb (109 kg)	1983-01-25	NC State
SG	18	Sasha Vujačić	6 ft 6 in (1.98 m)	200 lb (91 kg)	1984-03-08	Slovenia
SF	4	Luke Walton	6 ft 8 in (2.03 m)	235 lb (107 kg)	1980-03-28	Arizona
SG	9	Sun Yue	6 ft 9 in (2.06 m)	205 lb (93 kg)	1985-11-06	China

Coaches
Head coach
- Phil Jackson
Assistant(s)
- Kareem Abdul-Jabbar
- Jim Cleamons
- Frank Hamblen
- Craig Hodges
- Kurt Rambis
- Brian Shaw

Legend
- (DP) Unsigned draft pick
- (FA) Free agent
- (S) Suspended
- Injured

Roster
Updated: 2009-02-18

== Season summary ==
When the Lakers made it all the way to the 2008 NBA Finals without starter Andrew Bynum, they were seen as the favorites from the Western Conference to return there in 2009. The team's original starting lineup was:

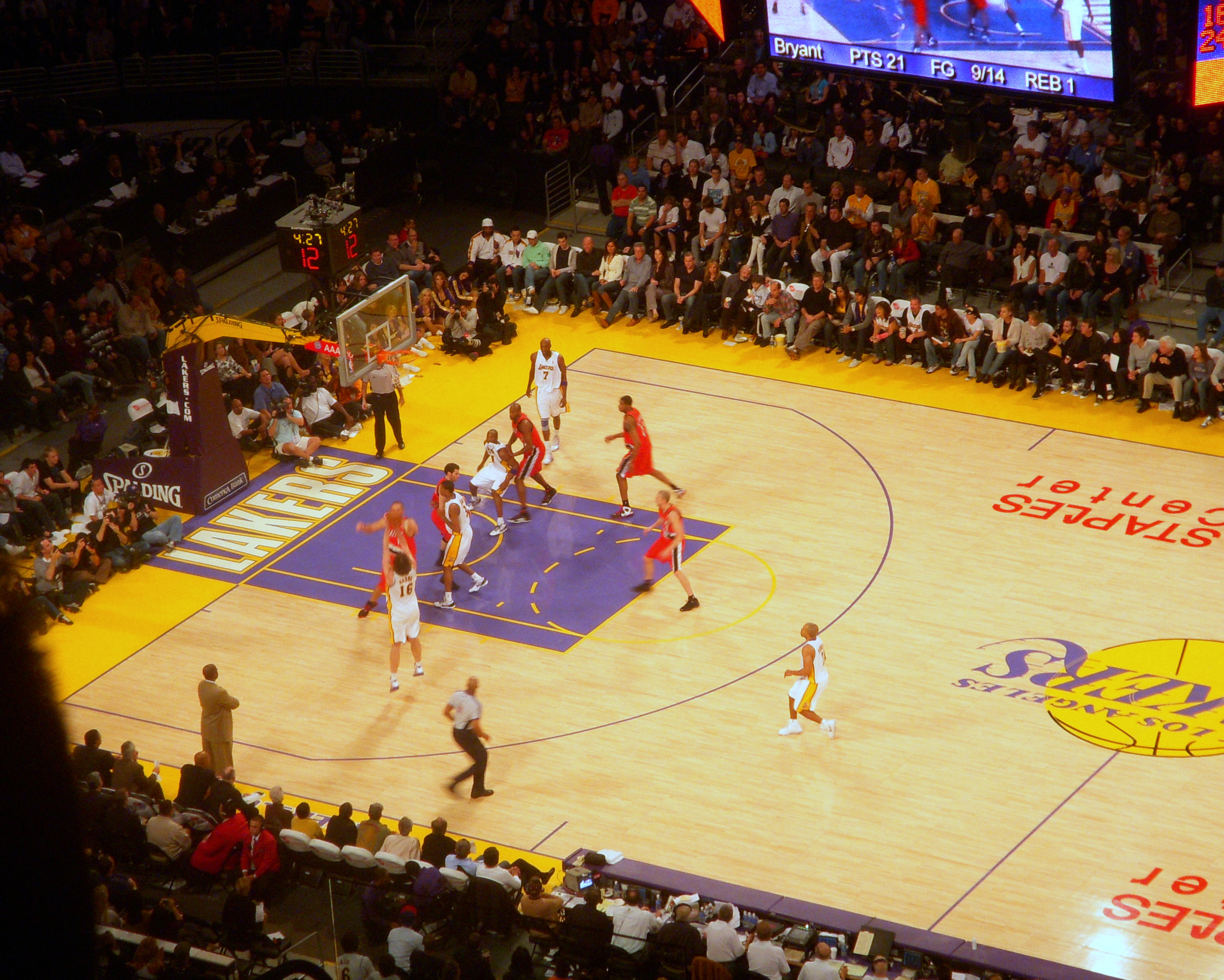
Lakers in a home game vs. the Trail Blazers.

C – Andrew Bynum
PF – Pau Gasol
SF – Vladimir Radmanović
SG – Kobe Bryant
PG – Derek Fisher

Having Radmanović start at SF instead of Lamar Odom was seen as a way to space out the offense since two 7-footers, Bynum and Gasol, were in the starting lineup.

With Bynum starting and swingman Trevor Ariza healthy, the team started off the season with a 7–0 record. A week later they tied the record for best start in franchise history. They were unable to break the record the next game, losing to the Sacramento Kings on the road. After peaking at a 21–3 record the Lakers played 4 games in 5 days on the road. They finished the road trip with a sub-par 2–2 record and were facing a rematch of last year's finals against the Boston Celtics on Christmas Day. Under the national spotlight the two teams kept the game close well into the fourth quarter, where the Lakers finally pulled away in the last 2:48 of the game. Phil Jackson earned his 1,000th career win in the game. The Lakers went to win 10 of 11 games, before losing back to back against the San Antonio Spurs and the Orlando Magic.

The losses revealed how injuries to role players Luke Walton and Jordan Farmar could affect the Lakers. Jackson eventually benched the under-performing Radmanović and was replaced by Walton in the starting lineup. Walton was chosen as starter because of his good passing skills and Jackson wanted to emphasize ball movement in the offense. Andrew Bynum was also criticized for his poor play, including a one rebound performance against the Houston Rockets on January 13. Bynum responded by going five straight games with a double-double including a career best 42 points against the Los Angeles Clippers. Around the same time Kobe Bryant also recorded two triple-doubles for the first and second time in his career since 2005.

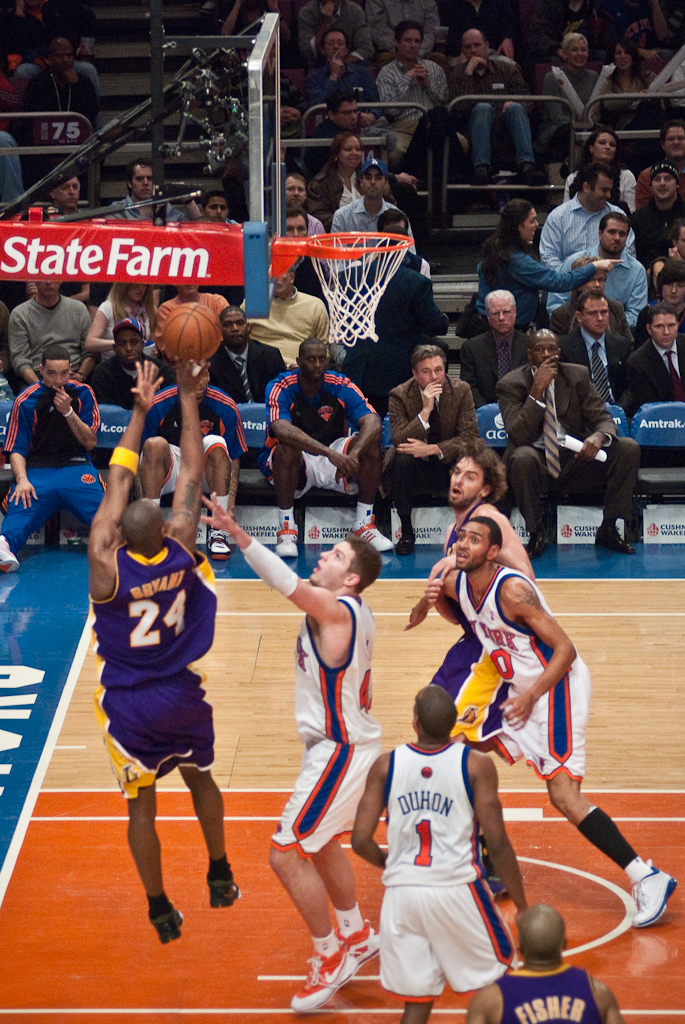
Bryant scored 61 points against the Knicks in New York.

On January 31, against the Memphis Grizzlies, Bynum left the game with an injured right knee after he was hit by Bryant driving to the basket. An MRI scan revealed he had a tear of the medial collateral ligament in his right knee and was expected to miss 8–12 weeks. To adjust to the injury Pau Gasol moved from power forward to center to replace Bynum and Lamar Odom was put into the starting lineup as power forward to replace Gasol. On February 7 the Lakers traded Vladimir Radmanović to the Charlotte Bobcats for Adam Morrison and Shannon Brown. Radmanović saw his role decrease drastically with the Lakers when he was taken out of the starting lineup, often coming in behind Walton and Trevor Ariza.

In a road game against the New York Knicks on February 2, Bryant scored 61 points on 61% shooting in a 126–117 win. Bryant's scoring outburst set a record for the most points ever scored at the historic Madison Square Garden, breaking Bernard King's record he remained for nearly five years until Carmelo Anthony broke his own record at this arena scored 62 points in 2014. Bryant's performance was also the highest single game point total of the 2008–2009 season in the NBA.

Aside from the team record, another result of the team's success was Kobe Bryant, Pau Gasol and Phil Jackson being selected to play and coach in the 2009 NBA All-Star Game. Bryant was named the All-Star MVP along with former teammate Shaquille O'Neal. After the All-Star break, the Lakers won 17 of 19 games.

After playing 27 of their first 46 games at home (a league high) the Lakers were on the road for 22 of 31 games; which started with a six-game road trip and ended with a seven-game road trip. The Lakers won the first six games on the road, including wins against the top two teams in the Eastern Conference, the Boston Celtics and the Cleveland Cavaliers (Cleveland's first of two home losses during the regular season). After the All-Star break, the Lakers won six straight games, but then went 2-5 including going 0–3 on the road. The Lakers redeemed themselves by winning two road games in two days; including a win against the Houston Rockets who were on a 12-game home winning streak and their Western rivals (and second seeded team in the West) the San Antonio Spurs.

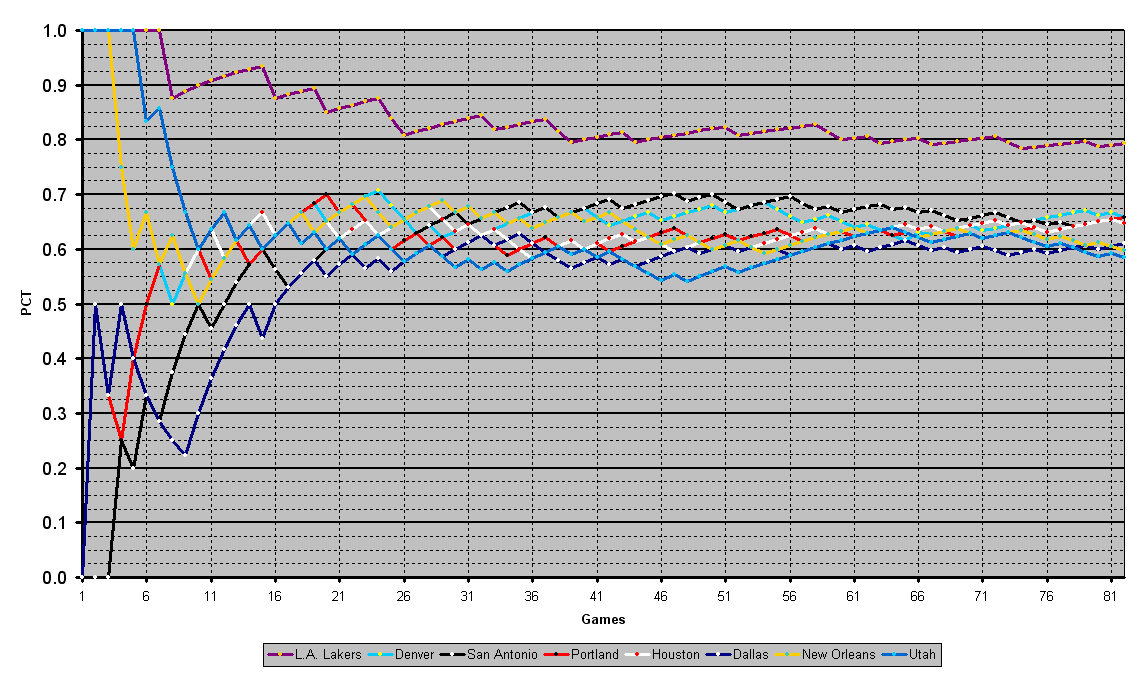
The Lakers spent the whole season atop the Western Conference standings.

In March, after recommending Phil Jackson to, Luke Walton was moved to the bench and was replaced with Trevor Ariza. Jackson hoped he can spark the bench activity which dwindled throughout the year. The change caused a surge in Ariza's production and allowed Walton to play less minutes against opposing teams' starting players. The Lakers were dealing with giving up leads in games and receiving inconsistent production from the reserves.

After spending the entire season with the best record in the Western Conference the Lakers clinched the top record in the Western Conference on March 27. Since then they were in a race with the Cleveland Cavaliers to finish with the best record in the league and secure home court advantage throughout the playoffs. With a loss to the Sixers on March 17, the Lakers fell to second place overall. They eventually conceded the best regular-season record to Cleveland and clinched the #2 record in the league in April. On April 9, Bynum returned to the Lakers after missing 31 games. His first game back he started and scored 16 points off of 7-11 shooting and grabbed 7 rebounds.

== Postseason ==
=== Utah Jazz ===
The Lakers went 65–17, and clinched the Pacific Division and home court advantage throughout the Western Conference playoffs. In the first round, the Lakers faced the eight-seeded Utah Jazz. The Lakers won Games 1 and 2 at the Staples, but lost Game 3 in Salt Lake City, following a game winner from Deron Williams. All three games saw the Lakers give up big leads, though they were able to still hold the series edge. After a 5-24 performance in Game 3, Kobe Bryant scored 38 points in Game 4 on 16 of 24 shooting in a road win. The Lakers won the series in Game 5 with a 107–96 win at home.

=== Houston Rockets ===
In the second round the Lakers faced the Houston Rockets. In Game 1, the Lakers fell behind in the first quarter and never got into a rhythm. As a result, they lost their first home game of the postseason. The Lakers rebounded in Game 2 behind Bryant's 40 point performance and a double double by Gasol and tied the series up at 1 win each. The game was very intense and physical as Derek Fisher of the Lakers and Ron Artest got ejected and technical fouls were assessed to Bryant, Artest, Luis Scola, Luke Walton and Lamar Odom. The series moved to Houston for Game 3 which the Lakers won 108–94 to retake home court advantage in the series. The Lakers went on to lose Game 4 87–99, despite Rockets center Yao Ming missing the game (and rest of the series) with a broken foot. In Game 5 the Lakers blew out the Rockets by 40 points, tying the Rockets worst loss in franchise history. Game 6 in Houston was a decisive 95-80 Rockets win. The Rockets jumped out to a 17–1 lead to start the game and were up at half time by 16. Game 6 was the most watched basketball game ever on ESPN. The final game of the series was played in Los Angeles on May 17. The Lakers routed the Rockets and won the game 89–70. With 2:30 left in the game the Lakers were up 89-58 and Bryant sat out for most of the 4th quarter. Kobe Bryant scored 14 points his lowest number of playoff points. In each game of the series the team that led at the first quarter won the game.

=== Denver Nuggets ===
In the third round the Lakers faced the Denver Nuggets. In Game 1, the Lakers fell behind in the first quarter by up to 13 points. In the second quarter the Lakers found their rhythm and took a 55–54 lead at halftime. In the fourth quarter the game was close and Kobe Bryant scored 18 of his 40 points in that quarter to lead the Lakers to a 105–103 to take a 1–0 series lead. In Game 2, the Lakers took a 41–27 lead in the second quarter. In the final minutes of the second quarter the Nuggets went on a 14–2 run to get themselves within 1. Ever since that the game was close. The Nuggets were able to get a win at Staples Center 106-103 which gave the Lakers their second home loss of the postseason. In Game 3, there was another close game which the winner was not decided until the Lakers pulled away at 12 seconds when Bryant made 2 free throws. The Lakers stole home court advantage back from the Nuggets with a 41-point performance from Kobe Bryant (13 of them in the 4th quarter). The Lakers were able to stop Denver's 16 home game winning streak by defeating the Nuggets 103–97 to take a 2–1 series lead. The Denver Nuggets would even the series by defeating the Lakers 120–101, thanks in part to 49 free throw attempts. The Lakers 120 points were the most the franchise has ever given up on the postseason, and they also allowed Denver to score 43 points in the 4th quarter. The Lakers defeated the Nuggets at Staples Center 103–94 in Game 5. Game 6 was a blowout in which the Lakers defeated the Nuggets 119–92 to advance to its franchise's 30th NBA Finals appearance.

=== Orlando Magic ===
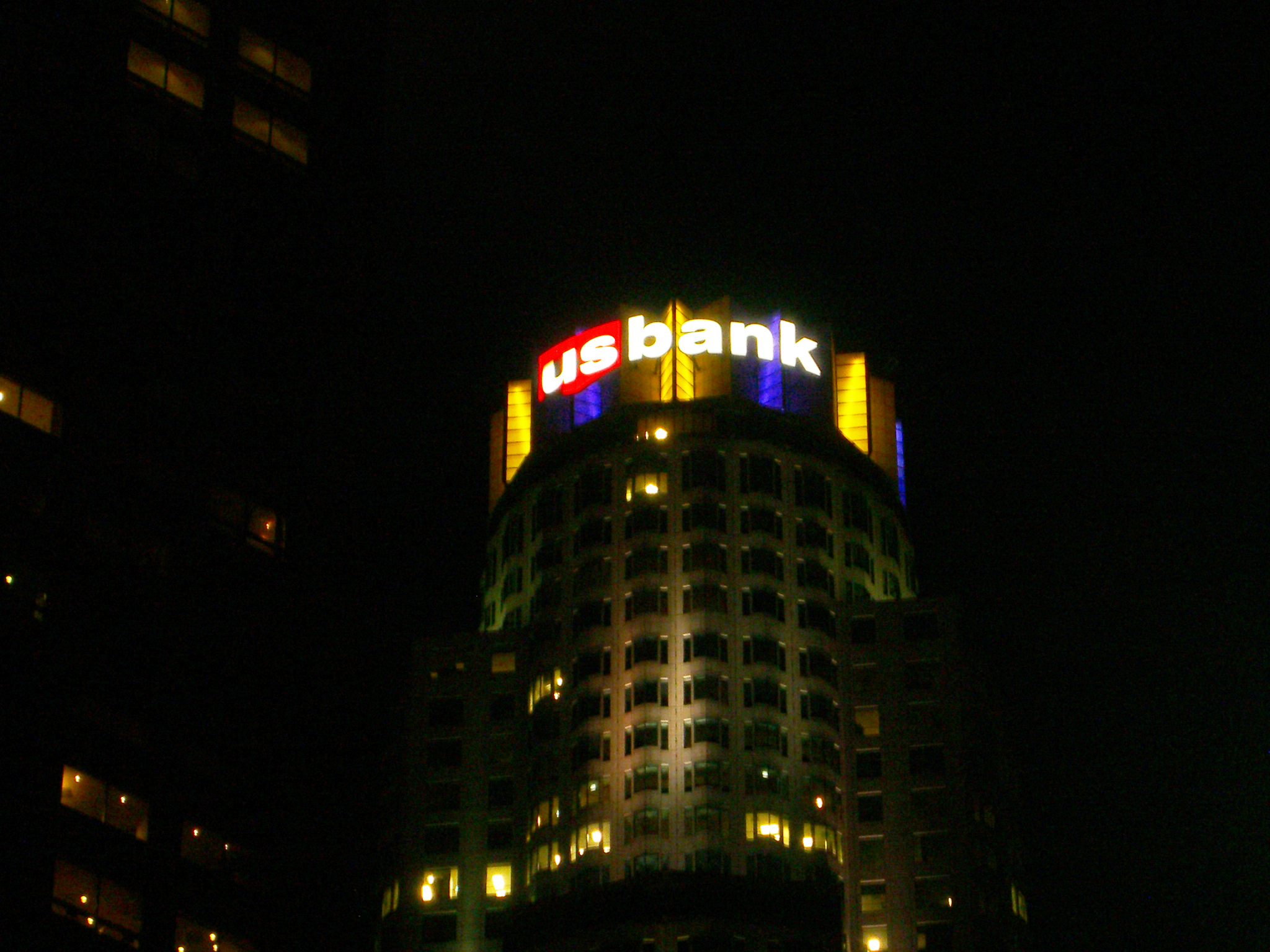
U.S. Bank Tower in Downtown Los Angeles lighted up Purple & Gold during the NBA Finals.

January 25, 2010 White House Visit (8:49)
On January 25, 2010, Barack Obama hosted the 2008–09 Los Angeles Lakers at the White House following their victory in the 2009 NBA Finals to end the 2008–09 NBA season.

While the Lakers were making their NBA record 30th Finals appearance, the Magic were entering only their second in franchise history. The Lakers had home court advantage due to having the better regular season record. The Lakers earned a blowout win in Game 1, defeating the Magic by 25 points. Game 2 was a tighter contest, with Magic guard Courtney Lee missing a game winning lay-up off an inbounds lob at the end of regulation. Instead, the game went into overtime and the Lakers prevailed. The series switched to Orlando for games 3, 4, and 5. In Game 3 the Magic shot 75% in the first half and 62.5% in the game, both NBA Finals records, to win by 4 and bring the series to 2–1. Game 4 was another close game. Derek Fisher hit two key 3-pointers, one with 4.6 seconds left in regulation to tie the game, and the other with 31.3 seconds to go in overtime. The Lakers moved within one win of their 15th championship by beating the Orlando Magic 99–91 to open a 3–1 series lead. The Lakers defeated the Magic in Game 5 to clinch their 15th NBA Championship with a 99–86 win, winning two consecutive games in Orlando.

Championship Celebration
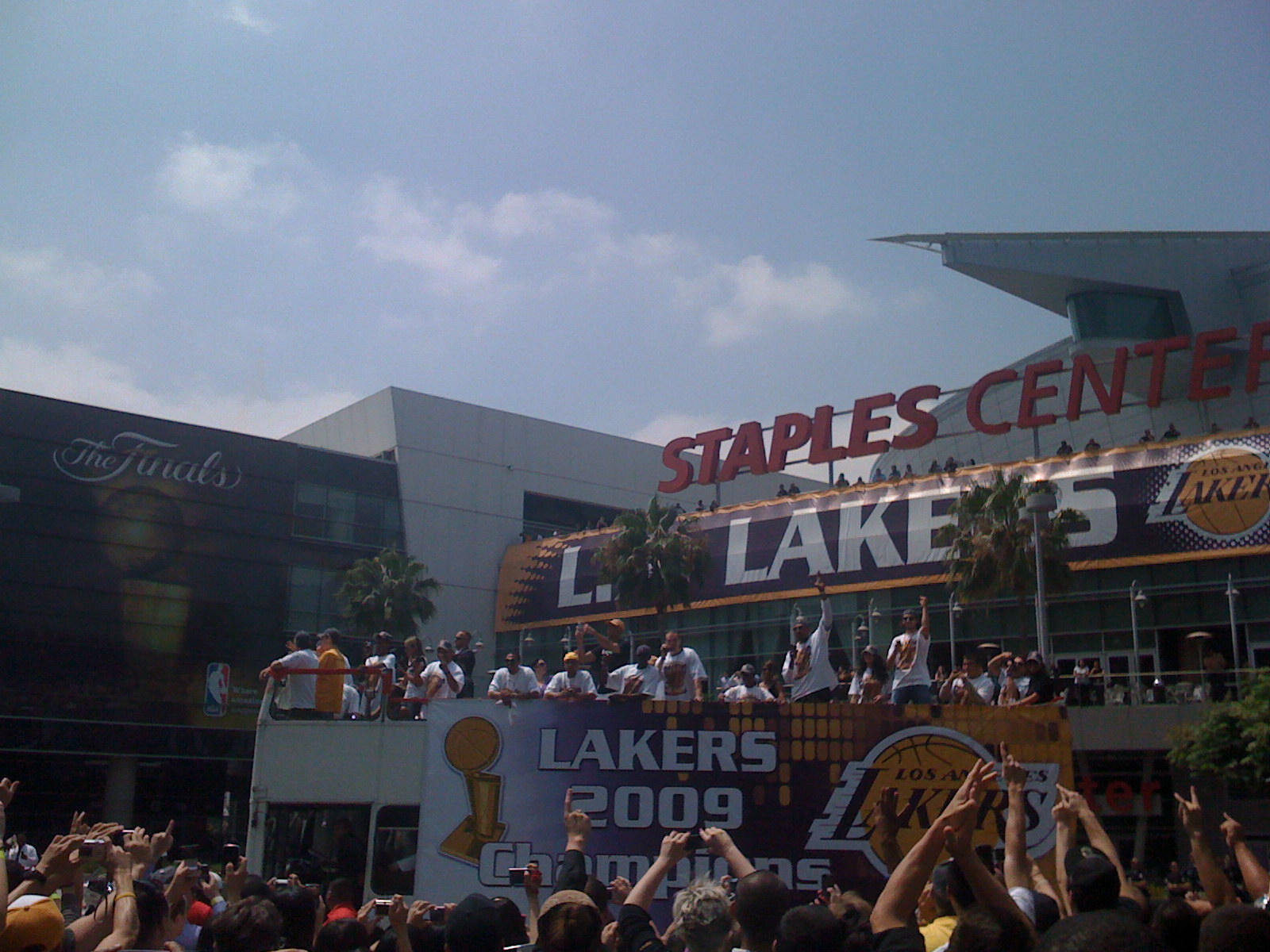
Fans celebrate with their 2009 NBA Champion Los Angeles Lakers.

== Regular season ==
=== Standings ===
Pacific Division	W	L	PCT	GB	Home	Road	Div	GP
c-Los Angeles Lakers	65	17	.793	—	36–5	29–12	14–2	82
Phoenix Suns	46	36	.561	19	28–13	18–23	11–5	82
Golden State Warriors	29	53	.354	36	21–20	8–33	6–10	82
Los Angeles Clippers	19	63	.232	46	11–30	8–33	2–14	82
Sacramento Kings	17	65	.207	48	11–30	6–35	7–9	82

#	Western Conference				
#	Team	W	L	PCT	GB
1	c-Los Angeles Lakers	65	17	.793	—
2	y-Denver Nuggets	54	28	.659	11
3	y-San Antonio Spurs	54	28	.659	11
4	x-Portland Trail Blazers	54	28	.659	11
5	x-Houston Rockets	53	29	.646	12
6	x-Dallas Mavericks	50	32	.610	15
7	x-New Orleans Hornets	49	33	.598	16
8	x-Utah Jazz	48	34	.585	17
9	Phoenix Suns	46	36	.561	19
10	Golden State Warriors	29	53	.354	36
11	Memphis Grizzlies	24	58	.293	41
12	Minnesota Timberwolves	24	58	.293	41
13	Oklahoma City Thunder	23	59	.280	42
14	Los Angeles Clippers	19	63	.232	46
15	Sacramento Kings	17	65	.207	48

== Game log ==
=== Pre-season ===
2008 preseason game log
Total: 6–2
Preseason

Game	Date	Team	Score	High points	High rebounds	High assists	Location Attendance	Record
1	October 7	Utah	L 90-99	Bynum & Farmar (15)	Andrew Bynum (8)	Bryant & Karl (5)	Honda Center (Anaheim, CA); 12,215	0–1
2	October 9	L.A. Clippers	L 80-107	Vladimir Radmanović (14)	Andrew Bynum (9)	Kobe Bryant (3)	Save Mart Center (Fresno, CA); 9,557	0–2
3	October 12	Sacramento	W 94-89	Pau Gasol (12)	Lamar Odom (9)	3 players tied (3)	Thomas & Mack Center (Las Vegas, NV); 11,090	1–2
4	October 18	FC Barcelona	W 108-104	Kobe Bryant (28)	Lamar Odom (8)	Farmar & Odom (5)	Staples Center; 14,572	2-2
5	October 19	Toronto	W 112-89	Jordan Farmar (16)	Chris Mihm (8)	Kobe Bryant (6)	Staples Center; 13,772	3–2
6	October 21	Charlotte	W 102-98	Jordan Farmar (17)	Andrew Bynum (8)	Andrew Bynum (5)	San Diego Sports Arena (San Diego, CA); 9,829	4–2
7	October 23	Charlotte	W 88-77	Pau Gasol (13)	Andrew Bynum (10)	Lamar Odom (5)	Honda Center (Anaheim, CA); 12,147	5–2
8	October 24	Oklahoma City	W 105-94	Andrew Bynum (23)	Ariza & Bynum (8)	Farmar & Fisher (5)	Citizens Business Bank Arena (Ontario, CA); 10,316	6–2

2008–09 season schedule

=== Regular season ===
2008–09 game log
Total: 65–17 (Home: 36–5; Road: 29–12)
October: 2–0 (home: 1–0; road: 1–0)

Game	Date	Team	Score	High points	High rebounds	High assists	Location Attendance	Record
1	October 28	Portland	W 96-76	Kobe Bryant (23)	Kobe Bryant (11)	Jordan Farmar (6)	Staples Center; 18,997	1–0
2	October 29	@ L.A. Clippers	W 117-79	Kobe Bryant (16)	Bynum & Gasol (9)	Pau Gasol (6)	Staples Center; 19,060	2–0

November: 12–1 (home: 8–1; road: 4–0)

Game	Date	Team	Score	High points	High rebounds	High assists	Location Attendance	Record
3	November 1	@ Denver	W 104-97	Kobe Bryant (33)	Pau Gasol (16)	Derek Fisher (4)	Pepsi Center; 19,651	3–0
4	November 5	L.A. Clippers	W 106-88	Kobe Bryant (27)	Andrew Bynum (17)	3 players tied (3)	Staples Center; 18,997	4–0
5	November 9	Houston	W 111-82	Kobe Bryant (23)	Pau Gasol (15)	Jordan Farmar (6)	Staples Center; 18,997	5–0
6	November 11	@ Dallas	W 106-99	Kobe Bryant (27)	Pau Gasol (11)	3 players tied (3)	American Airlines Center; 20,391	6–0
7	November 12	@ New Orleans	W 93-86	Bryant & Fisher (20)	Lamar Odom (9)	Kobe Bryant (6)	New Orleans Arena; 18,239	7–0
8	November 14	Detroit	L 95-106	Kobe Bryant (29)	Pau Gasol (10)	Bryant & Gasol (6)	Staples Center; 18,997	7–1
9	November 18	Chicago	W 116-109	Pau Gasol (34)	Andrew Bynum (9)	Kobe Bryant (6)	Staples Center; 18,997	8–1
10	November 20	@ Phoenix	W 105-92	Kobe Bryant (24)	Gasol & Odom (9)	Pau Gasol (9)	US Airways Center; 18,422	9–1
11	November 21	Denver	W 104-90	Kobe Bryant (29)	Andrew Bynum (13)	Andrew Bynum (5)	Staples Center; 18,997	10–1
12	November 23	Sacramento	W 118-108	Kobe Bryant (24)	Trevor Ariza (11)	Kobe Bryant (6)	Staples Center; 18,997	11–1
13	November 25	New Jersey	W 120-93	Pau Gasol (26)	Pau Gasol (8)	Ariza & Bryant (4)	Staples Center; 18,997	12–1
14	November 28	Dallas	W 114-107	Kobe Bryant (35)	Andrew Bynum (10)	Kobe Bryant (5)	Staples Center; 18,997	13–1
15	November 30	Toronto	W 112-99	Pau Gasol (24)	Bynum & Odom (10)	Kobe Bryant (7)	Staples Center; 18,997	14–1

December: 11–4 (home: 7–0; road: 4–4)

Game	Date	Team	Score	High points	High rebounds	High assists	Location Attendance	Record
16	December 2	@ Indiana	L 117-118	Kobe Bryant (28)	Bynum & Gasol (9)	Lamar Odom (5)	Conseco Fieldhouse; 16,412	14–2
17	December 3	@ Philadelphia	W 114-102	Kobe Bryant (32)	Pau Gasol (13)	4 players tied (4)	Wachovia Center; 19,119	15–2
18	December 5	@ Washington	W 106-104	Kobe Bryant (23)	Bynum & Gasol (10)	Kobe Bryant (7)	Verizon Center; 20,173	16–2
19	December 7	Milwaukee	W 105-92	Kobe Bryant (20)	Andrew Bynum (14)	Kobe Bryant (8)	Staples Center; 18,997	17–2
20	December 9	@ Sacramento	L 101-113	Kobe Bryant (28)	Pau Gasol (12)	Trevor Ariza (4)	ARCO Arena; 16,068	17–3
21	December 10	Phoenix	W 115-110	Pau Gasol (28)	Andrew Bynum (11)	Lamar Odom (7)	Staples Center; 18,997	18–3
22	December 12	Sacramento	W 112-103	Kobe Bryant (32)	Pau Gasol (11)	Luke Walton (8)	Staples Center; 18,997	19–3
23	December 14	Minnesota	W 98-86	Kobe Bryant (26)	Pau Gasol (11)	Fisher & Gasol (6)	Staples Center; 18,997	20–3
24	December 16	New York	W 116-114	Kobe Bryant (28)	Lamar Odom (12)	Derek Fisher (7)	Staples Center; 18,997	21–3
25	December 19	@ Miami	L 87-89	Kobe Bryant (28)	Pau Gasol (11)	Derek Fisher (4)	American Airlines Arena; 19,600	21–4
26	December 20	@ Orlando	L 103-106	Kobe Bryant (41)	Bryant & Odom (8)	Derek Fisher (4)	Amway Arena; 17,461	21–5
27	December 22	@ Memphis	W 105-96	Kobe Bryant (36)	Pau Gasol (7)	Pau Gasol (6)	FedExForum; 17,456	22–5
28	December 23	@ New Orleans	W 100-87	Kobe Bryant (26)	Lamar Odom (8)	Lamar Odom (5)	New Orleans Arena; 18,405	23–5
29	December 25	Boston	W 92–83	Kobe Bryant (27)	Kobe Bryant (9)	Derek Fisher (7)	Staples Center; 18,997	24–5
30	December 28	Golden State	W 130-113	Kobe Bryant (31)	Andrew Bynum (10)	Pau Gasol (7)	Staples Center; 18,997	25–5

January: 12–4 (home: 7–3; road: 5–1)

Game	Date	Team	Score	High points	High rebounds	High assists	Location Attendance	Record
31	January 2	Utah	W 113-100	Kobe Bryant (40)	Pau Gasol (11)	Pau Gasol (6)	Staples Center; 18,997	26–5
32	January 4	Portland	W 100-86	Kobe Bryant (26)	Andrew Bynum (10)	Derek Fisher (5)	Staples Center; 18,997	27–5
33	January 6	New Orleans	L 105-116	Kobe Bryant (39)	Bynum & Gasol (8)	Kobe Bryant (7)	Staples Center; 18,997	27–6
34	January 7	@ Golden State	W 114-106	Pau Gasol (33)	Pau Gasol (18)	Derek Fisher (8)	Oracle Arena; 19,596	28–6
35	January 9	Indiana	W 121-119	Kobe Bryant (36)	Pau Gasol (11)	Kobe Bryant (13)	Staples Center; 18,997	29–6
36	January 11	Miami	W 108-105	Andrew Bynum (24)	Pau Gasol (18)	Derek Fisher (11)	Staples Center; 18,997	30–6
37	January 13	@ Houston	W 105-100	Kobe Bryant (33)	Bryant & Gasol (7)	3 players tied (4)	Toyota Center; 18,557	31–6
38	January 14	@ San Antonio	L 111-112	Kobe Bryant (29)	Kobe Bryant (7)	Kobe Bryant (10)	AT&T Center; 18,797	31–7
39	January 16	Orlando	L 103-109	Kobe Bryant (28)	Kobe Bryant (13)	Kobe Bryant (11)	Staples Center; 18,997	31–8
40	January 19	Cleveland	W 105-88	Pau Gasol (22)	Pau Gasol (13)	Kobe Bryant (12)	Staples Center; 18,997	32–8
41	January 21	@ L.A. Clippers	W 108-97	Andrew Bynum (42)	Andrew Bynum (15)	Kobe Bryant (12)	Staples Center; 19,627	33–8
42	January 22	Washington	W 117-97	Andrew Bynum (23)	Andrew Bynum (14)	Derek Fisher (8)	Staples Center; 18,997	34–8
43	January 25	San Antonio	W 99-85	Kobe Bryant (22)	Andrew Bynum (11)	Fisher & Gasol (4)	Staples Center; 18,997	35–8
44	January 27	Charlotte	L 110-117 (2OT)	Kobe Bryant (38)	Andrew Bynum (14)	Derek Fisher (6)	Staples Center; 18,997	35–9
45	January 30	@ Minnesota	W 132-119	Kobe Bryant (30)	Andrew Bynum (15)	Kobe Bryant (5)	Target Center; 19,111	36–9
46	January 31	@ Memphis	W 115-98	Kobe Bryant (25)	Pau Gasol (8)	Kobe Bryant (7)	FedExForum; 18,119	37–9

February: 11–2 (home: 4–0; road: 7–2)

Game	Date	Team	Score	High points	High rebounds	High assists	Location Attendance	Record
47	February 2	@ New York	W 126-117	Kobe Bryant (61)	Gasol & Odom (14)	Gasol & Walton (5)	Madison Square Garden; 19,763	38–9
48	February 4	@ Toronto	W 115-107	Kobe Bryant (36)	Pau Gasol (15)	Bryant & Walton (5)	Air Canada Centre; 19,800	39–9
49	February 5	@ Boston	W 110-109 (OT)	Kobe Bryant (26)	Pau Gasol (14)	Bryant & Fisher (5)	TD Banknorth Garden; 18,624	40–9
50	February 8	@ Cleveland	W 101-91	Lamar Odom (28)	Lamar Odom (17)	Pau Gasol (6)	Quicken Loans Arena; 20,562	41–9
51	February 10	Oklahoma City	W 105-98	Kobe Bryant (34)	Lamar Odom (18)	Jordan Farmar (5)	Staples Center; 18,997	42–9
52	February 11	@ Utah	L 109-113	Kobe Bryant (37)	Lamar Odom (19)	Bryant & Farmar (4)	EnergySolutions Arena; 19,911	42–10
All-Star Break
53	February 17	Atlanta	W 96-83	Lamar Odom (15)	Lamar Odom (20)	Pau Gasol (10)	Staples Center; 18,997	43–10
54	February 18	@ Golden State	W 129-121	Kobe Bryant (30)	Pau Gasol (13)	Kobe Bryant (9)	Oracle Arena; 20,007	44–10
55	February 20	New Orleans	W 115-111 (OT)	Kobe Bryant (39)	Lamar Odom (17)	Pau Gasol (6)	Staples Center; 18,997	45–10
56	February 22	@ Minnesota	W 111-108	Kobe Bryant (28)	Lamar Odom (14)	Kobe Bryant (7)	Target Center; 19,177	46–10
57	February 24	@ Oklahoma City	W 107-93	Kobe Bryant (36)	Gasol & Odom (8)	Pau Gasol (6)	Ford Center; 19,136	47–10
58	February 26	Phoenix	W 132-106	Lamar Odom (23)	Gasol & Odom (9)	Kobe Bryant (8)	Staples Center; 18,997	48–10
59	February 27	@ Denver	L 79-90	Kobe Bryant (29)	Lamar Odom (19)	Derek Fisher (5)	Pepsi Center; 19,920	48–11

March: 10–5 (home: 4–1; road: 6–4)

Game	Date	Team	Score	High points	High rebounds	High assists	Location Attendance	Record
60	March 1	@ Phoenix	L 111-118	Kobe Bryant (49)	Kobe Bryant (11)	Lamar Odom (5)	US Airways Center; 18,422	48–12
61	March 3	Memphis	W 99-89	Kobe Bryant (31)	Lamar Odom (13)	Lamar Odom (8)	Staples Center; 18,997	49–12
62	March 6	Minnesota	W 110-90	Kobe Bryant (23)	Pau Gasol (9)	Bryant & Walton (4)	Staples Center; 18,997	50–12
63	March 9	@ Portland	L 94-111	Kobe Bryant (26)	Pau Gasol (13)	Farmar & Mbenga (4)	Rose Garden; 20,573	50–13
64	March 11	@ Houston	W 102-96	Kobe Bryant (37)	Josh Powell (9)	Kobe Bryant (6)	Toyota Center; 18,449	51–13
65	March 12	@ San Antonio	W 102-95	Bryant & Gasol (23)	Pau Gasol (11)	Kobe Bryant (6)	AT&T Center; 18,797	52–13
66	March 15	Dallas	W 107-100	Kobe Bryant (28)	Lamar Odom (14)	Derek Fisher (6)	Staples Center; 18,997	53–13
67	March 17	Philadelphia	L 93-94	Pau Gasol (25)	Lamar Odom (11)	Pau Gasol (6)	Staples Center; 18,997	53–14
68	March 19	Golden State	W 114-106	Bryant & Gasol (21)	Pau Gasol (14)	Jordan Farmar (7)	Staples Center; 18,997	54–14
69	March 21	@ Chicago	W 117-109	Kobe Bryant (28)	Pau Gasol (10)	Kobe Bryant (7)	United Center; 23,011	55–14
70	March 24	@ Oklahoma City	W 107-89	Kobe Bryant (19)	Pau Gasol (14)	Pau Gasol (7)	Ford Center; 19,136	56–14
71	March 26	@ Detroit	W 92-77	Kobe Bryant (30)	Pau Gasol (11)	Bryant & Odom (7)	The Palace of Auburn Hills; 22,076	57–14
72	March 27	@ New Jersey	W 103-95	Pau Gasol (36)	Gasol & Odom (11)	Kobe Bryant (9)	Izod Center; 19,990	58–14
73	March 29	@ Atlanta	L 76-86	Pau Gasol (21)	Pau Gasol (11)	Bryant & Odom (4)	Philips Arena; 20,148	58–15
74	March 31	@ Charlotte	L 84-94	Kobe Bryant (25)	Pau Gasol (11)	Pau Gasol (7)	Time Warner Cable Arena; 19,568	58–16

April: 7–1 (home: 5–0; road: 2–1)

Game	Date	Team	Score	High points	High rebounds	High assists	Location Attendance	Record
75	April 1	@ Milwaukee	W 104-98	Kobe Bryant (30)	Lamar Odom (10)	Kobe Bryant (4)	Bradley Center; 18,717	59–16
76	April 3	Houston	W 93-81	Pau Gasol (23)	Lamar Odom (11)	Kobe Bryant (7)	Staples Center; 18,997	60–16
77	April 5	L.A. Clippers	W 88-85	Bryant & Odom (18)	Lamar Odom (10)	Bryant & Farmar (5)	Staples Center; 18,997	61–16
78	April 7	@ Sacramento	W 122-104	Pau Gasol (26)	Pau Gasol (12)	Luke Walton (9)	ARCO Arena; 17,317	62–16
79	April 9	Denver	W 116-102	Kobe Bryant (33)	Pau Gasol (19)	Lamar Odom (4)	Staples Center; 18,997	63–16
80	April 10	@ Portland	L 98-106	Kobe Bryant (32)	Lamar Odom (10)	Luke Walton (8)	Rose Garden; 20,681	63–17
81	April 12	Memphis	W 92-75	Andrew Bynum (18)	Pau Gasol (13)	3 players tied (4)	Staples Center; 18,997	64–17
82	April 14	Utah	W 125-112	Andrew Bynum (22)	Pau Gasol (9)	Pau Gasol (6)	Staples Center; 18,997	65–17

2008–09 season schedule

=== Playoffs ===
2009 playoff game log
Total: 16–7 (Home: 10–2; Road: 6–5)
First Round: 4–1 (home: 3–0; road: 1–1)

Game	Date	Team	Score	High points	High rebounds	High assists	Location Attendance	Series
1	April 19	Utah	W 113-100	Kobe Bryant (24)	Pau Gasol (9)	Kobe Bryant (8)	Staples Center; 18,997	1–0
2	April 21	Utah	W 119-109	Kobe Bryant (26)	Ariza & Bryant (9)	Bryant & Gasol (9)	Staples Center; 18,997	2–0
3	April 23	@ Utah	L 86-88	Lamar Odom (21)	Lamar Odom (14)	Kobe Bryant (6)	EnergySolutions Arena; 19,111	2–1
4	April 25	@ Utah	W 108-94	Kobe Bryant (38)	Lamar Odom (15)	Lamar Odom (6)	EnergySolutions Arena; 19,111	3–1
5	April 27	Utah	W 107-96	Kobe Bryant (31)	Lamar Odom (15)	4 players tied (4)	Staples Center; 18,997	4–1

Conference Semifinals: 4–3 (home: 3–1; road: 1–2)

Game	Date	Team	Score	High points	High rebounds	High assists	Location Attendance	Series
1	May 4	Houston	L 92-100	Kobe Bryant (32)	Pau Gasol (13)	Bryant & Gasol (4)	Staples Center; 18,997	0–1
2	May 6	Houston	W 111-98	Kobe Bryant (40)	Pau Gasol (14)	Luke Walton (5)	Staples Center; 18,997	1–1
3	May 8	@ Houston	W 108-94	Kobe Bryant (33)	Lamar Odom (13)	Luke Walton (7)	Toyota Center; 18,495	2–1
4	May 10	@ Houston	L 87-99	Pau Gasol (30)	Pau Gasol (9)	Kobe Bryant (5)	Toyota Center; 18,495	2–2
5	May 12	Houston	W 118-78	Kobe Bryant (26)	Pau Gasol (13)	Jordan Farmar (6)	Staples Center; 18,997	3–2
6	May 14	@ Houston	L 80-95	Kobe Bryant (32)	Lamar Odom (14)	Kobe Bryant (3)	Toyota Center; 18,501	3–3
7	May 17	Houston	W 89-70	Pau Gasol (21)	Pau Gasol (18)	Kobe Bryant (5)	Staples Center; 18,997	4–3

Conference Finals: 4–2 (home: 2–1; road: 2–1)

Game	Date	Team	Score	High points	High rebounds	High assists	Location Attendance	Series
1	May 19	Denver	W 105-103	Kobe Bryant (40)	Pau Gasol (14)	Derek Fisher (6)	Staples Center; 18,997	1–0
2	May 21	Denver	L 103-106	Kobe Bryant (32)	Pau Gasol (17)	Luke Walton (4)	Staples Center; 18,997	1–1
3	May 23	@ Denver	W 103-97	Kobe Bryant (41)	Pau Gasol (11)	Kobe Bryant (5)	Pepsi Center; 19,939	2–1
4	May 25	@ Denver	L 101-120	Kobe Bryant (34)	Pau Gasol (10)	Bryant & Walton (5)	Pepsi Center; 20,037	2–2
5	May 27	Denver	W 103-94	Kobe Bryant (22)	Lamar Odom (14)	Kobe Bryant (8)	Staples Center; 18,997	3–2
6	May 29	@ Denver	W 119-92	Kobe Bryant (35)	Pau Gasol (12)	Kobe Bryant (10)	Pepsi Center; 20,053	4–2

NBA Finals: 4–1 (home: 2–0; road: 2–1)

Game	Date	Team	Score	High points	High rebounds	High assists	Location Attendance	Series
1	June 4	Orlando	W 100-75	Kobe Bryant (40)	Lamar Odom (14)	Kobe Bryant (8)	Staples Center; 18,997	1–0
2	June 7	Orlando	W 101-96 (OT)	Kobe Bryant (29)	Pau Gasol (10)	Kobe Bryant (8)	Staples Center; 18,997	2–0
3	June 9	@ Orlando	L 104-108	Kobe Bryant (31)	Trevor Ariza (7)	Kobe Bryant (8)	Amway Arena; 17,461	2–1
4	June 11	@ Orlando	W 99-91 (OT)	Kobe Bryant (32)	Pau Gasol (10)	Kobe Bryant (8)	Amway Arena; 17,461	3–1
5	June 14	@ Orlando	W 99-86	Kobe Bryant (30)	Pau Gasol (15)	Kobe Bryant (5)	Amway Arena; 17,461	4–1

2009 playoff schedule

== Player statistics ==
Legend
GP	Games played	GS	Games started	MPG	Minutes per game
FG%	Field-goal percentage	3P%	3-point field-goal percentage	FT%	Free-throw percentage
RPG	Rebounds per game	APG	Assists per game	SPG	Steals per game
BPG	Blocks per game	PPG	Points per game

=== Regular season ===
Player	GP	GS	MPG	FG%	3P%	FT%	RPG	APG	SPG	BPG	PPG
Trevor Ariza	82	20	24.4	.460	.319	.710	4.3	1.8	1.7	.3	8.9
Shannon Brown	18	0	7.6	.524	.667	.889	1.1	.6	.2	.1	3.2
Kobe Bryant	82	82	36.1	.467	.351	.856	5.2	4.9	1.5	.5	26.8
Andrew Bynum	50	50	28.9	.560	.	.707	8.0	1.4	.4	1.8	14.3
Jordan Farmar	65	0	18.3	.391	.336	.584	1.8	2.4	.9	.2	6.4
Derek Fisher	82	82	29.8	.424	.397	.846	2.3	3.2	1.2	.1	9.9
Pau Gasol	81	81	37.0	.567	.500	.781	9.6	3.5	.6	1.0	18.9
D. J. Mbenga	23	0	7.9	.474	.000	.875	1.3	.4	.4	1.0	2.7
Chris Mihm	18	0	5.8	.375	.	.857	1.9	.6	.1	.3	2.0
Adam Morrison	8	0	5.5	.333	.250	.500	1.0	.4	.0	.0	1.3
Lamar Odom	78	32	29.7	.492	.320	.623	8.2	2.6	1.0	1.3	11.3
Josh Powell	60	1	11.7	.444	.	.760	2.9	.5	.2	.3	4.2
Vladimir Radmanovic	46	28	16.8	.444	.441	.852	2.5	.8	.6	.2	5.9
Sasha Vujacic	80	0	16.2	.387	.363	.921	1.7	1.4	1.0	.1	5.8
Luke Walton	65	34	17.9	.436	.298	.719	2.8	2.7	.5	.2	5.0
Sun Yue	10	0	2.8	.273	.000	.	.0	.2	.1	.1	.6

=== Playoffs ===
Player	GP	GS	MPG	FG%	3P%	FT%	RPG	APG	SPG	BPG	PPG
Trevor Ariza	23	23	31.4	.497	.476	.563	4.2	2.3	1.6	.4	11.3
Shannon Brown	21	0	13.1	.434	.480	.792	1.2	.6	.5	.1	4.9
Kobe Bryant	23	23	40.9	.457	.349	.883	5.3	5.5	1.7	.9	30.2
Andrew Bynum	23	18	17.4	.457	.	.651	3.7	.4	.3	.9	6.3
Jordan Farmar	20	1	13.0	.391	.308	.737	1.4	1.7	.5	.2	4.7
Derek Fisher	22	22	28.9	.394	.284	.861	2.0	2.2	1.0	.0	8.0
Pau Gasol	23	23	40.5	.580	.	.714	10.8	2.5	.8	2.0	18.3
D. J. Mbenga	7	0	2.3	.167	.	.	.4	.0	.0	.3	.3
Lamar Odom	23	5	32.0	.524	.514	.613	9.1	1.8	.7	1.3	12.3
Josh Powell	14	0	5.2	.423	1.000	1.000	1.2	.3	.0	.1	2.1
Sasha Vujacic	23	0	10.9	.264	.314	.833	1.4	.5	.4	.2	3.0
Luke Walton	21	0	15.8	.427	.313	.611	2.5	2.1	.7	.1	3.8

== Awards and records ==
=== Awards ===
- The Los Angeles Lakers won the 2009 NBA Championship.
- Kobe Bryant was named the 2009 NBA Finals MVP.

==== All-Star ====
- Phil Jackson was named the Western Conference coach for the 2009 NBA All-Star Game. It was his fourth time coaching an All-Star team and second time with the Los Angeles Lakers.
- Kobe Bryant was voted to his 11th consecutive NBA All-Star Game as a starter.
- Pau Gasol was selected to his second NBA All-Star Game.
- Kobe Bryant was named the 2009 NBA All-Star MVP with former teammate Shaquille O'Neal.

==== Weekly/Monthly ====
- Phil Jackson was named Western Conference Coach of the Month for games played in October and November.
- Kobe Bryant was named Western Conference Player of the Week for games played from December 22 to December 28.
- Kobe Bryant was named Western Conference Player of the Month for December 2008.
- Kobe Bryant was named Western Conference Player of the Week for games played from January 5 to January 11.
- Andrew Bynum was named Western Conference Player of the Week for games played from January 19 to January 25.
- Kobe Bryant was named the Western Conference Player of the Month for January 2009.
- Pau Gasol was named Western Conference Player of the Week for games played from February 2 to February 8.
- Pau Gasol was named Western Conference Player of the Week for games played from February 16 to February 27.
- Pau Gasol was named Western Conference Player of the Month for February.
- Kobe Bryant was named Western Conference Player of the Week for games played from March 9 to March 15.

=== Records ===
- Phil Jackson reached 1,000 career wins on December 25, 2008, against the Boston Celtics. With 1,423 games coached, he became the fastest coach in NBA history to reach 1,000 wins, surpassing former Lakers coach Pat Riley.
- With a 17–2 season start, the Lakers tied their record for best opening in franchise history.
- On February 2, Kobe Bryant scored 61 points against the New York Knicks, making it the most points scored at Madison Square Garden ever.
- On February 8, the Lakers became the first team in NBA history to win back-to-back games on the road (Boston and Cleveland), against teams with .800-plus win percentage at least 40 games into the season.
- Vladimir Radmanović set a record for highest three-point field goal percentage in franchise history.
- On February 10, at 30 years, 171 days of age, Kobe Bryant surpassed Wilt Chamberlain (30 years, 176 days) as the youngest player to score 23,000 points in his career.
- On February 22, Kobe Bryant moved past Elgin Baylor into 20th place on the NBA's career scoring list.
- On February 24, Kobe Bryant moved past Adrian Dantley into 19th place on the NBA's career scoring list.
- On March 6, Kobe Bryant moved past Robert Parish into 18th place on the NBA's career scoring list.
- On March 27 Phil Jackson coached 728 games for the Los Angeles Lakers, surpassing the franchise record set by Pat Riley.
- On April 10, Kobe Bryant moved past Charles Barkley into 17th place on the NBA's career scoring list.
- On June 7, Phil Jackson coached his 42nd Finals game, surpassing Red Auerbach for most NBA Finals games coached.
- On June 14, Phil Jackson won his 10th NBA title as a head coach, surpassing Red Auerbach for most all-time.

== Transactions ==
=== Trades ===
February 7, 2009	To Los Angeles Lakers ----Adam Morrison, Shannon Brown	To Charlotte Bobcats ----Vladimir Radmanović
February 18, 2009	To Los Angeles Lakers ----Conditional second-round draft pick in 2013	To Memphis Grizzlies ----Chris Mihm

=== Free agents ===
==== Additions ====
Player	Signed	Former team
Josh Powell	August 14	Los Angeles Clippers

==== Subtractions ====
Player	Left	New team
Ronny Turiaf	July 18	Golden State Warriors
Coby Karl	July 1	free agent
Ira Newble	July 1	free agent
