= 2008–09 Sacramento Kings season =

NBA professional basketball team season

- Head coach: Reggie Theus (games 1–24, fired); Kenny Natt (interim, games 25–82)
- General manager: Geoff Petrie
- Owners: Maloof family
- Arena: ARCO Arena

Results
- Record: 17–65 (.207)
- Place: Division: 5th (Pacific); Conference: 15th (Western)
- Playoff finish: Did not qualify
- Stats at Basketball Reference

Local media
- Television: CSN California, KXTV
- Radio: KHTK

The 2008–09 Sacramento Kings season was the 64th season of the franchise, 60th in the National Basketball Association (NBA), 24th in Sacramento. They traded away Ron Artest to the Houston Rockets in exchange for former Kings guard Bobby Jackson as well as acquiring Donte Greene, a 2009 first–round draft pick, and cash considerations during the offseason. The Kings struggled all season and finished with a franchise–worst 17–65 record, surpassing their franchise record mark set in the 1989–90 season of 23–59 record while also suffering their first 60–loss season in franchise history.

After a slow start into the season, on December 15, 2008, just ten days before Christmas, the Kings fired their head coach Reggie Theus and their assistant head coach Chuck Person after a 6–18 start to the season. They were replaced by assistant coach Kenny Natt on an interim basis for the rest of the season.

At the trade deadline in midseason after the All-Star break, the Kings traded away former two–time All-Star Brad Miller and John Salmons to the Chicago Bulls in exchange for Andrés Nocioni, Drew Gooden, Michael Ruffin, Cedric Simmons, and future draft picks. Kings' guard Kevin Martin played only 51 games due to ankle injuries. This season would be his final full season with the team before being traded to the Houston Rockets in the trade deadline following the season.

Also, following the season, interim head coach Natt and their four assistant coaches Rex Kalamian, former Kings' player Randy Brown, Bubba Burrage, and Jason Hamm were all fired on April 24, 2009; just nine days after the regular season was concluded with a franchise–low 17–win single season Kings' record. Natt was replaced by former Phoenix Suns and Seattle SuperSonics (now, Oklahoma City Thunder) head coach Paul Westphal on June 9, 2009.

The team notably set a dubious inter-conference record, going 1–29 against the Eastern Conference. Their lone victory against an Eastern Conference opponent was the New York Knicks at Madison Square Garden on March 20, 2009.

== Key dates ==
- June 26: The 2008 NBA draft took place in New York City, New York.
- July 1: The free agency period started.

== Draft picks ==
Round	Pick	Player	Position	Nationality	College
1	12	Jason Thompson	Power forward	United States	Rider
2	42	Sean Singletary	Point guard	United States	Virginia
2	43	Patrick Ewing Jr.	Power forward	United States	Georgetown

== Roster ==
Sacramento Kings roster
Players

Pos.	No.	Player	Height	Weight	DOB	From
C	52	Calvin Booth	6 ft 11 in (2.11 m)	230 lb (104 kg)		Penn State
F	3	Ike Diogu	6 ft 8 in (2.03 m)	250 lb (113 kg)		Arizona State
G/F	32	Francisco García	6 ft 7 in (2.01 m)	195 lb (88 kg)		Louisville
G/F	20	Donté Greene	6 ft 11 in (2.11 m)	226 lb (103 kg)		Syracuse
C	31	Spencer Hawes	7 ft 1 in (2.16 m)	245 lb (111 kg)		Washington
G	24	Bobby Jackson	6 ft 1 in (1.85 m)	185 lb (84 kg)		Minnesota
G	23	Kevin Martin (injured)	6 ft 7 in (2.01 m)	199 lb (90 kg)		Western Carolina
G	7	Rashad McCants	6 ft 4 in (1.93 m)	207 lb (94 kg)		North Carolina
F	5	Andrés Nocioni	6 ft 7 in (2.01 m)	225 lb (102 kg)		Argentina
F	15	Cedric Simmons	6 ft 9 in (2.06 m)	235 lb (107 kg)		NC State
F	9	Kenny Thomas	6 ft 7 in (2.01 m)	261 lb (118 kg)		New Mexico
F/C	34	Jason Thompson	6 ft 11 in (2.11 m)	250 lb (113 kg)		Rider
G	19	Beno Udrih	6 ft 3 in (1.91 m)	205 lb (93 kg)		Slovenia

Coaches
Head coach
- Kenny Natt (interim) (Northeast Louisiana)
Assistant(s)
- Shareef Abdur-Rahim (California)
- Randy Brown (New Mexico State)
- Bubba Burrage (Cal Poly)
- Jason Hamm (South Alabama)
- Rex Kalamian (Cal Poly)
- Chuck Person (Auburn)

Legend
- (DP) Unsigned draft pick
- (FA) Free agent
- (S) Suspended
- Injured

=== Roster notes ===
- Ike Diogu holds American citizenship, but he represents Nigeria in international play.

== Regular season ==
=== Standings ===
Pacific Division	W	L	PCT	GB	Home	Road	Div	GP
c-Los Angeles Lakers	65	17	.793	—	36–5	29–12	14–2	82
Phoenix Suns	46	36	.561	19	28–13	18–23	11–5	82
Golden State Warriors	29	53	.354	36	21–20	8–33	6–10	82
Los Angeles Clippers	19	63	.232	46	11–30	8–33	2–14	82
Sacramento Kings	17	65	.207	48	11–30	6–35	7–9	82

#	Western Conference				
#	Team	W	L	PCT	GB
1	c-Los Angeles Lakers	65	17	.793	—
2	y-Denver Nuggets	54	28	.659	11
3	y-San Antonio Spurs	54	28	.659	11
4	x-Portland Trail Blazers	54	28	.659	11
5	x-Houston Rockets	53	29	.646	12
6	x-Dallas Mavericks	50	32	.610	15
7	x-New Orleans Hornets	49	33	.598	16
8	x-Utah Jazz	48	34	.585	17
9	Phoenix Suns	46	36	.561	19
10	Golden State Warriors	29	53	.354	36
11	Memphis Grizzlies	24	58	.293	41
12	Minnesota Timberwolves	24	58	.293	41
13	Oklahoma City Thunder	23	59	.280	42
14	Los Angeles Clippers	19	63	.232	46
15	Sacramento Kings	17	65	.207	48

=== Game log ===
2008–09 game log
October: 0–2 (home: 0–0; road: 0–2)

Game	Date	Team	Score	High points	High rebounds	High assists	Location Attendance	Record
1	October 29	@ Minnesota	L 96–98	John Salmons (24)	Spencer Hawes (14)	John Salmons (8)	Target Center; 17,820	0–1
2	October 31	@ Miami	L 77–103	Quincy Douby, John Salmons (14)	Spencer Hawes (11)	John Salmons (3)	American Airlines Arena; 19,600	0–2

November: 5–12 (home: 3–6; road: 2–6)

Game	Date	Team	Score	High points	High rebounds	High assists	Location Attendance	Record
3	November 1	@ Orlando	L 103–121	Kevin Martin (31)	Jason Thompson (5)	Beno Udrih (5)	Amway Arena; 16,704	0–3
4	November 3	@ Philadelphia	L 91–125	Jason Thompson (17)	Spencer Hawes (8)	Jason Thompson (5)	Wachovia Center; 10,100	0–4
5	November 5	Memphis	W 100–95	Kevin Martin (33)	Mikki Moore (11)	Beno Udrih (6)	ARCO Arena; 13,685	1–4
6	November 7	Minnesota	W 121–109	Kevin Martin (26)	Brad Miller (10)	Kevin Martin (6)	ARCO Arena; 10,592	2–4
7	November 9	Golden State	W 115–98	Kevin Martin (27)	Spencer Hawes (11)	Brad Miller (6)	ARCO Arena; 12,090	3–4
8	November 11	Detroit	L 92–100	Spencer Hawes (19)	Jason Thompson (9)	John Salmons (7)	ARCO Arena; 11,423	3–5
9	November 12	@ L.A. Clippers	W 103–98	Beno Udrih (30)	Brad Miller, Jason Thompson (11)	Brad Miller (8)	Staples Center; 13,266	4–5
10	November 14	Phoenix	L 95–97 (OT)	John Salmons (21)	Brad Miller (11)	Brad Miller (7)	ARCO Arena; 12,810	4–6
11	November 16	San Antonio	L 88–90	John Salmons (31)	Brad Miller, Mikki Moore (8)	Beno Udrih, Brad Miller (4)	ARCO Arena; 11,699	4–7
12	November 18	@ Memphis	L 94–109	John Salmons (18)	Jason Thompson (9)	Beno Udrih, Brad Miller (5)	FedExForum; 10,834	4–8
13	November 19	@ New Orleans	W 105–96	John Salmons (29)	Brad Miller (8)	Beno Udrih (7)	New Orleans Arena; 15,533	5–8
14	November 21	Portland	L 96–117	Jason Thompson (19)	Jason Thompson (12)	Bobby Brown (7)	ARCO Arena; 12,056	5–9
15	November 23	@ L.A. Lakers	L 108–118	John Salmons (24)	Spencer Hawes (8)	Bobby Brown, Beno Udrih (7)	Staples Center; 18,997	5–10
16	November 24	@ Portland	L 90–91	John Salmons (20)	Brad Miller, Jason Thompson (6)	Beno Udrih (8)	Rose Garden; 20,467	5–11
17	November 26	New Jersey	L 114–116 (OT)	John Salmons (38)	Brad Miller (13)	Beno Udrih (10)	ARCO Arena; 11,650	5–12
18	November 28	@ Utah	L 94–120	John Salmons (20)	Donté Greene, Spencer Hawes (6)	Beno Udrih, Brad Miller (6)	EnergySolutions Arena; 19,911	5–13
19	November 29	Dallas	L 78–101	Beno Udrih (13)	Beno Udrih (9)	Beno Udrih (7)	ARCO Arena; 12,650	5–14

December: 3–10 (home: 3–5; road: 0–5)

Game	Date	Team	Score	High points	High rebounds	High assists	Location Attendance	Record
20	December 2	Utah	L 94–99	Kevin Martin (22)	Brad Miller (9)	Spencer Hawes (6)	ARCO Arena; 10,798	5–15
21	December 6	Denver	L 85–118	John Salmons (22)	Jason Thompson (15)	Beno Udrih (4)	ARCO Arena; 12,322	5–16
22	December 9	L.A. Lakers	W 113–101	John Salmons, Francisco García (21)	Spencer Hawes (9)	Brad Miller, Beno Udrih (5)	ARCO Arena; 16,068	6–16
23	December 12	@ L.A. Lakers	L 103–112	John Salmons (26)	Jason Thompson (8)	Beno Udrih (7)	Staples Center; 18,997	6–17
24	December 13	New York	L 90–114	John Salmons (14)	Jason Thompson (11)	Beno Udrih (6)	ARCO Arena; 12,155	6–18
25	December 15	Minnesota	W 118–103	Francisco García (21)	Spencer Hawes, Brad Miller (10)	Bobby Brown (6)	ARCO Arena; 10,593	7–18
26	December 16	@ Portland	L 77–109	John Salmons (21)	Mikki Moore (6)	Beno Udrih (4)	Rose Garden; 20,005	7–19
27	December 19	@ Houston	L 96–107	John Salmons (26)	Brad Miller (11)	John Salmons, Brad Miller, Beno Udrih (3)	Toyota Center; 18,271	7–20
28	December 20	@ New Orleans	L 90–99	John Salmons (26)	Jason Thompson (10)	John Salmons (7)	New Orleans Arena; 16,869	7–21
29	December 22	@ San Antonio	L 85–101	John Salmons (22)	Jason Thompson, Francisco García, Spencer Hawes, Brad Miller (6)	Beno Udrih (4)	AT&T Center; 18,372	7–22
30	December 26	Toronto	L 101–107	John Salmons, Brad Miller (20)	Spencer Hawes, Brad Miller (8)	John Salmons, Beno Udrih, Bobby Brown (4)	ARCO Arena; 12,059	7–23
31	December 28	Boston	L 63–108	John Salmons (11)	Mikki Moore (8)	Beno Udrih (3)	ARCO Arena; 16,029	7–24
32	December 30	L.A. Clippers	W 92–90	Kevin Martin (20)	Brad Miller (13)	John Salmons (6)	ARCO Arena; 11,420	8–24

January: 2–14 (home: 1–5; road: 1–9)

Game	Date	Team	Score	High points	High rebounds	High assists	Location Attendance	Record
33	January 2	@ Detroit	L 92–98	Brad Miller (25)	Brad Miller (16)	John Salmons (4)	The Palace of Auburn Hills; 22,076	8–25
34	January 3	@ Indiana	L 117–122	Kevin Martin (45)	Bobby Jackson (10)	Kevin Martin, Brad Miller (6)	Conseco Fieldhouse; 12,765	8–26
35	January 5	@ New Jersey	L 90–98	Kevin Martin (36)	Kenny Thomas (8)	Brad Miller (8)	Izod Center; 12,314	8–27
36	January 6	@ Chicago	L 94–99	Kevin Martin (29)	Brad Miller (12)	Beno Udrih (5)	United Center; 18,060	8–28
37	January 9	Miami	L 115–119 (OT)	John Salmons (29)	Brad Miller (16)	John Salmons, Brad Miller, Bobby Jackson (4)	ARCO Arena; 12,587	8–29
38	January 11	Dallas	W 102–95	Kevin Martin (21)	Spencer Hawes (8)	Beno Udrih (6)	ARCO Arena; 12,294	9–29
39	January 13	Orlando	L 107–139	Kevin Martin (30)	Francisco García (5)	Francisco García (5)	ARCO Arena; 11,168	9–30
40	January 14	@ Golden State	W 135–133 (3OT)	Brad Miller (30)	Brad Miller (22)	John Salmons, Beno Udrih (7)	Oracle Arena; 19,122	10–30
41	January 16	Milwaukee	L 122–129	John Salmons, Kevin Martin (24)	Jason Thompson (11)	John Salmons (6)	ARCO Arena; 11,663	10–31
42	January 20	@ Denver	L 99–118	Kevin Martin (25)	Jason Thompson (11)	John Salmons, Beno Udrih (5)	Pepsi Center; 15,164	10–32
43	January 21	Washington	L 107–110	John Salmons, Beno Udrih (24)	John Salmons, Shelden Williams, Jason Thompson (5)	John Salmons (5)	ARCO Arena; 10,821	10–33
44	January 24	@ Milwaukee	L 104–106	Kevin Martin (20)	Brad Miller (13)	Brad Miller (9)	Bradley Center; 15,379	10–34
45	January 25	@ Toronto	L 97–113	John Salmons (21)	John Salmons (7)	Beno Udrih (5)	Air Canada Centre; 18,127	10–35
46	January 27	@ Cleveland	L 110–117	Kevin Martin (35)	Kevin Martin (7)	Kevin Martin (7)	Quicken Loans Arena; 20,562	10–36
47	January 28	@ Boston	L 100–119	John Salmons (22)	Jason Thompson (11)	John Salmons (5)	TD Banknorth Garden; 18,624	10–37
48	January 30	Chicago	L 88–109	Kevin Martin (27)	Jason Thompson (12)	Spencer Hawes, Kevin Martin (3)	ARCO Arena; 13,356	10–38

February: 3–10 (home: 2–4; road: 1–6)

Game	Date	Team	Score	High points	High rebounds	High assists	Location Attendance	Record
49	February 1	Oklahoma City	W 122–118 (OT)	Kevin Martin (37)	John Salmons (10)	John Salmons (8)	ARCO Arena; 10,817	11–38
50	February 2	@ Phoenix	L 81–129	John Salmons (19)	Spencer Hawes (9)	Spencer Hawes, Donté Greene, John Salmons, Jason Thompson (2)	US Airways Center; 18,422	11–39
51	February 6	Utah	L 107–111	Kevin Martin (37)	Spencer Hawes (8)	John Salmons (7)	ARCO Arena; 17,317	11–40
52	February 8	@ Oklahoma City	L 113–116	Beno Udrih (29)	Beno Udrih, Kevin Martin, Spencer Hawes, Jason Thompson (6)	John Salmons (11)	Ford Center; 18,271	11–41
53	February 10	@ Dallas	L 100–118	Kevin Martin (18)	Bobby Jackson (6)	John Salmons, Beno Udrih (5)	American Airlines Center; 19,667	11–42
54	February 11	@ Houston	L 82–94	Kevin Martin (18)	Spencer Hawes (7)	Spencer Hawes (6)	Toyota Center; 15,626	11–43
55	February 18	Atlanta	L 100–105	Kevin Martin (32)	Spencer Hawes (14)	Kevin Martin, Beno Udrih, Bobby Jackson (4)	ARCO Arena; 11,213	11–44
56	February 20	@ Memphis	W 115–106	Kevin Martin (33)	Jason Thompson (9)	Beno Udrih (6)	FedExForum; 15,036	12–44
57	February 21	@ Dallas	L 95–116	Beno Udrih (18)	Spencer Hawes (9)	Beno Udrih (7)	American Airlines Center; 20,223	12–45
58	February 23	New Orleans	L 105–112	Kevin Martin (32)	Spencer Hawes (14)	Francisco García (6)	ARCO Arena; 11,633	12–46
59	February 25	Charlotte	L 91–98	Kevin Martin (27)	Drew Gooden (13)	Francisco García, Bobby Jackson (4)	ARCO Arena; 10,439	12–47
60	February 27	L.A. Clippers	W 98–86	Kevin Martin (20)	Spencer Hawes (15)	Francisco García (6)	ARCO Arena; 12,846	13–47
61	February 28	@ Utah	L 89–102	Kevin Martin (19)	Jason Thompson (12)	Andrés Nocioni, Francisco García, Jason Thompson, Spencer Hawes (3)	EnergySolutions Arena; 19,911	13–48

March: 3–9 (home: 2–6; road: 1–3)

Game	Date	Team	Score	High points	High rebounds	High assists	Location Attendance	Record
62	March 3	Indiana	L 109–117	Kevin Martin (21)	Spencer Hawes, Jason Thompson, Andrés Nocioni (7)	Bobby Jackson (5)	ARCO Arena; 10,748	13–49
63	March 8	Denver	W 114–106	Kevin Martin (26)	Spencer Hawes, Bobby Jackson (8)	Kevin Martin (8)	ARCO Arena; 12,678	14–49
64	March 10	Oklahoma City	L 98–99	Spencer Hawes (20)	Spencer Hawes (10)	Bobby Jackson (6)	ARCO Arena; 10,784	14–50
65	March 13	Cleveland	L 123–126 (OT)	Kevin Martin (34)	Andrés Nocioni (9)	Spencer Hawes (4)	ARCO Arena; 16,317	14–51
66	March 15	@ Washington	L 104–106	Kevin Martin (24)	Jason Thompson (14)	Beno Udrih (7)	Verizon Center; 15,108	14–52
67	March 17	@ Atlanta	L 97–119	Kevin Martin (31)	Jason Thompson (8)	Beno Udrih (6)	Philips Arena; 14,226	14–53
68	March 18	@ Charlotte	L 88–104	Rashad McCants (30)	Jason Thompson (11)	Beno Udrih (6)	Time Warner Cable Arena; 13,594	14–54
69	March 20	@ New York	W 121–94	Kevin Martin (30)	Spencer Hawes (13)	Beno Udrih (7)	Madison Square Garden; 19,763	15–54
70	March 22	Philadelphia	L 100–112	Francisco García (24)	Jason Thompson (13)	Spencer Hawes (9)	ARCO Arena; 12,943	15–55
71	March 27	Memphis	L 95–113	Kevin Martin (31)	Jason Thompson (8)	Beno Udrih (5)	ARCO Arena; 12,987	15–56
72	March 29	Phoenix	W 126–118	Jason Thompson (21)	Spencer Hawes (10)	Beno Udrih (7)	ARCO Arena; 13,623	16–56
73	March 31	New Orleans	L 110–111	Andrés Nocioni (23)	Beno Udrih (7)	Beno Udrih (6)	ARCO Arena; 17,317	16–57

April: 1–8 (home: 0–4; road: 1–4)

Game	Date	Team	Score	High points	High rebounds	High assists	Location Attendance	Record
74	April 1	@ Golden State	L 141–143 (OT)	Kevin Martin (50)	Jason Thompson (19)	Beno Udrih (9)	Oracle Arena; 18,743	16–58
75	April 3	@ Phoenix	L 111–139	Francisco García (29)	Spencer Hawes (10)	Beno Udrih (8)	US Airways Center; 18,422	16–59
76	April 5	Golden State	L 100–105	Bobby Jackson (17)	Andrés Nocioni (15)	Beno Udrih (6)	ARCO Arena; 12,975	16–60
77	April 7	L.A. Lakers	L 104–122	Spencer Hawes (21)	Spencer Hawes (15)	Beno Udrih (6)	ARCO Arena; 17,317	16–61
78	April 9	Houston	L 98–115	Spencer Hawes (22)	Spencer Hawes (11)	Beno Udrih (5)	ARCO Arena; 12,897	16–62
79	April 10	@ L.A. Clippers	L 78–109	Beno Udrih (18)	Spencer Hawes (13)	Beno Udrih, Spencer Hawes (4)	Staples Center; 18,232	16–63
80	April 12	San Antonio	L 92–95	Spencer Hawes (24)	Jason Thompson (11)	Beno Udrih (6)	ARCO Arena; 13,330	16–64
81	April 13	@ Denver	L 98–118	Ike Diogu (32)	Ike Diogu (11)	Bobby Jackson (12)	Pepsi Center; 15,823	16–65
82	April 15	@ Minnesota	W 97–90	Ike Diogu (28)	Ike Diogu (13)	García, Udrih (5)	Target Center; 17,333	17–65

2008–09 season schedule

== Player statistics ==
Legend
GP	Games played	GS	Games started	MPG	Minutes per game
FG%	Field-goal percentage	3P%	3-point field-goal percentage	FT%	Free-throw percentage
RPG	Rebounds per game	APG	Assists per game	SPG	Steals per game
BPG	Blocks per game	PPG	Points per game

=== Regular season ===
Player	GP	GS	MPG	FG%	3P%	FT%	RPG	APG	SPG	BPG	PPG
Calvin Booth	7	0	7.9	.500	.	.750	1.4	.0	.1	.3	2.3
Bobby Brown	47	1	14.4	.381	.330	.765	.8	1.9	.3	.0	5.2
Ike Diogu	10	1	14.2	.600	.500	.758	3.9	.3	.2	.1	9.2
Quincy Douby	20	0	11.4	.341	.270	.933	1.3	.7	.1	.3	4.2
Francisco García	65	36	30.4	.444	.398	.820	3.4	2.3	1.2	1.0	12.7
Drew Gooden	1	0	26.0	.556	.	1.000	13.0	2.0	.0	.0	12.0
Donte Greene	55	4	13.2	.326	.260	.853	1.6	.5	.3	.3	3.8
Spencer Hawes	77	51	29.3	.466	.348	.662	7.1	1.9	.6	1.2	11.4
Bobby Jackson	71	10	20.9	.398	.305	.851	2.8	2.0	.9	.1	7.5
Kevin Martin	51	46	38.2	.420	.415	.867	3.6	2.7	1.2	.2	24.6
Rashad McCants	24	1	19.4	.444	.357	.783	2.0	1.5	.8	.3	10.3
Brad Miller	43	43	31.5	.474	.465	.801	8.0	3.4	.7	.6	11.9
Mikki Moore	46	20	16.2	.521	.	.810	3.3	.6	.3	.3	3.5
Andres Nocioni	23	16	31.0	.448	.441	.763	6.0	1.8	.6	.7	13.7
John Salmons	53	53	37.4	.472	.418	.823	4.2	3.7	1.1	.2	18.3
Cedric Simmons	7	0	3.3	.000	.	.500	.6	.0	.0	.0	.1
Will Solomon	14	0	12.0	.406	.448	.500	1.5	.7	.5	.0	5.0
Kenny Thomas	8	0	7.8	.375	.	.	1.9	.1	.8	.1	.8
Jason Thompson	82	56	28.1	.497	.000	.692	7.4	1.1	.6	.7	11.1
Beno Udrih	73	72	31.1	.461	.310	.820	3.0	4.7	1.1	.2	11.0
Shelden Williams	30	0	10.2	.449	.000	.762	2.6	.3	.4	.3	3.7

== Transactions ==
=== Free agents ===
==== Additions ====
Player	Signed	Former team
Bobby Brown	July 23	Alba Berlin

==== Subtractions ====
Player	Left	New team
Anthony Johnson	July 15	Orlando Magic
