= Brevin Knight =

American basketball player (born 1975)

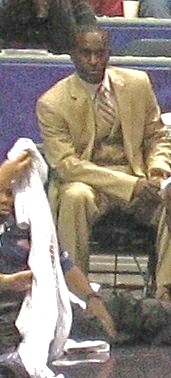
- Knight on the bench in 2006

Personal information
- Born: November 8, 1975 (age 51) Livingston, New Jersey, U.S.
- Listed height: 5 ft 10 in (1.78 m)
- Listed weight: 166 lb (75 kg)

Career information
- High school: Seton Hall Preparatory (West Orange, New Jersey)
- College: Stanford (1993–1997)
- NBA draft: 1997: 1st round, 16th overall pick
- Drafted by: Cleveland Cavaliers
- Playing career: 1997–2009
- Position: Point guard
- Number: 12, 22, 6, 2

Career history
- 1997–2001: Cleveland Cavaliers
- 2001: Atlanta Hawks
- 2001–2003: Memphis Grizzlies
- 2003: Phoenix Suns
- 2003–2004: Washington Wizards
- 2004: Milwaukee Bucks
- 2004–2007: Charlotte Bobcats
- 2007–2008: Los Angeles Clippers
- 2008–2009: Utah Jazz

Career highlights
- NBA All-Rookie First Team (1998); Consensus second-team All-American (1997); Frances Pomeroy Naismith Award (1997); 3× First-team All-Pac-10 (1995–1997); Pac-10 Freshman of the Year (1994)

Career NBA statistics
- Points: 5,342 (7.3 ppg)
- Assists: 4,481 (6.1 apg)
- Steals: 1,229 (1.7 spg)
- Stats at NBA.com
- Stats at Basketball Reference

Brevin Adon Knight (born November 8, 1975) is an American former professional basketball point guard who played with nine teams in the National Basketball Association (NBA) from 1997 to 2009. Knight played college basketball for the Stanford Cardinal and was selected by the Cleveland Cavaliers in the 1997 NBA draft. As of 2026, he is a color commentator for the Memphis Grizzlies on DAZN.

== Early life and college career ==
Knight grew up in East Orange, New Jersey and attended Seton Hall Preparatory School in West Orange, New Jersey, leading its basketball team to New Jersey state championships his sophomore, junior, and senior years. He was named to the Newark Star-Ledger's All-State First Team. Knight was a late signee for Stanford University. At Stanford, where he was the all-time leader in assists (780) and steals (298) and third all-time in scoring (1,714). He was chosen by the Cleveland Cavaliers with the 16th pick in the 1997 NBA draft.

== Professional career ==
Knight was drafted with the 16th pick of the first round in the 1997 NBA draft. In his rookie season, Knight led the NBA in steals per game and was named to the NBA All-Rookie First Team. He played for the Cavaliers, the Atlanta Hawks, the Memphis Grizzlies, the Phoenix Suns, the Washington Wizards, the Milwaukee Bucks, the Charlotte Bobcats, the Los Angeles Clippers, and the Utah Jazz, averaging 7.3 points and 6.1 assists per game in his career. On January 21, 2001, while on the Hawks, Knight scored a career-best 31 points while adding 10 rebounds, during a 94–90 loss to the Washington Wizards.

The Bobcats signed Knight via free agency in the 2004 NBA offseason. During their inaugural 2004–05 NBA season, he averaged 10.1 points, 9 assists, and 1.98 steals per game as the Bobcats went 18–64. Knight finished second in assists per game in the league, behind MVP Steve Nash. He was waived by the Bobcats on June 29, 2007, after spending three seasons with the team. On August 13, 2007, he signed a two-year contract with the Los Angeles Clippers. He was traded to the Utah Jazz on July 23, 2008, for Jason Hart.

== NBA career statistics ==
Legend
GP	Games played	GS	Games started	MPG	Minutes per game
FG%	Field goal percentage	3P%	3-point field goal percentage	FT%	Free throw percentage
RPG	Rebounds per game	APG	Assists per game	SPG	Steals per game
BPG	Blocks per game	PPG	Points per game	**Bold**	Career high

=== Regular season ===
Year	Team	GP	GS	MPG	FG%	3P%	FT%	RPG	APG	SPG	BPG	PPG
1997–98	Cleveland	**80**	**76**	31.0	**.441**	.000	.801	3.2	8.2	**2.5**	.2	9.0
1998–99	Cleveland	39	38	30.4	.425	.000	.745	**3.4**	7.7	1.8	.2	9.6
1999–00	Cleveland	65	46	27.0	.412	.200	.761	3.0	7.0	1.6	**.3**	9.3
2000–01	Cleveland	6	0	15.5	.133	.000	.833	1.2	4.2	1.0	.2	1.5
2000–01	Atlanta	47	43	29.0	.385	.100	.817	**3.4**	6.1	2.0	.1	6.9
2001–02	Memphis	53	11	21.7	.422	.250	.757	2.1	5.7	1.5	.1	7.0
2002–03	Memphis	55	4	16.9	.425	.250	.541	1.5	4.2	1.3	.0	3.9
2003–04	Phoenix	3	0	6.3	.333	.000	.000	1.0	1.3	1.0	**.3**	.7
2003–04	Washington	32	12	18.7	.420	.200	.704	1.9	3.2	1.6	.0	4.3
2003–04	Milwaukee	21	1	20.0	.438	**.333**	.789	2.3	4.7	1.4	.0	5.9
2004–05	Charlotte	66	61	29.5	.422	.150	.852	2.6	**9.0**	2.0	.1	10.1
2005–06	Charlotte	69	67	**34.1**	.399	.231	.803	3.2	8.8	2.3	.1	**12.6**
2006–07	Charlotte	45	25	28.3	.419	.056	.805	2.6	6.6	1.5	.1	9.1
2007–08	L.A. Clippers	74	39	22.6	.404	.000	**.873**	1.9	4.4	1.4	.1	4.6
2008–09	Utah	74	0	12.7	.349	.000	.750	1.2	2.6	.9	.1	2.4
Career		729	423	24.9	.412	.134	.789	2.4	6.1	1.7	.1	7.3

=== Playoffs ===
Year	Team	GP	GS	MPG	FG%	3P%	FT%	RPG	APG	SPG	BPG	PPG
1998	Cleveland	4	**4**	**33.0**	**.286**	.000	.600	**4.0**	**5.8**	2.5	**.3**	**4.5**
2004	Milwaukee	**5**	0	20.2	.261	.000	**.818**	2.2	3.4	**2.8**	.2	4.2
2009	Utah	**5**	0	3.4	.000	.000	.000	.2	.6	.2	.0	.0
Career		14	4	17.9	.255	.000	.714	2.0	3.1	1.8	.1	2.8

== Later life ==
Knight joined the Memphis Grizzlies broadcast team as a color commentator on Fox Sports Tennessee in 2010. Knight and his wife Deena have two daughters, Brenna and Kayla Knight and a son Donevin Knight. He is the brother of Brandin Knight.
