= 2008–09 Utah Jazz season =

NBA professional basketball team season

- Head coach: Jerry Sloan
- General manager: Kevin O'Connor
- Owner: Larry H. Miller
- Arena: EnergySolutions Arena

Results
- Record: 48–34 (.585)
- Place: Division: 3rd (Northwest); Conference: 8th (Western)
- Playoff finish: First Round (lost to Lakers 1–4)
- Stats at Basketball Reference

Local media
- Television: FSN Utah; KJZZ
- Radio: KFNZ; KBEE

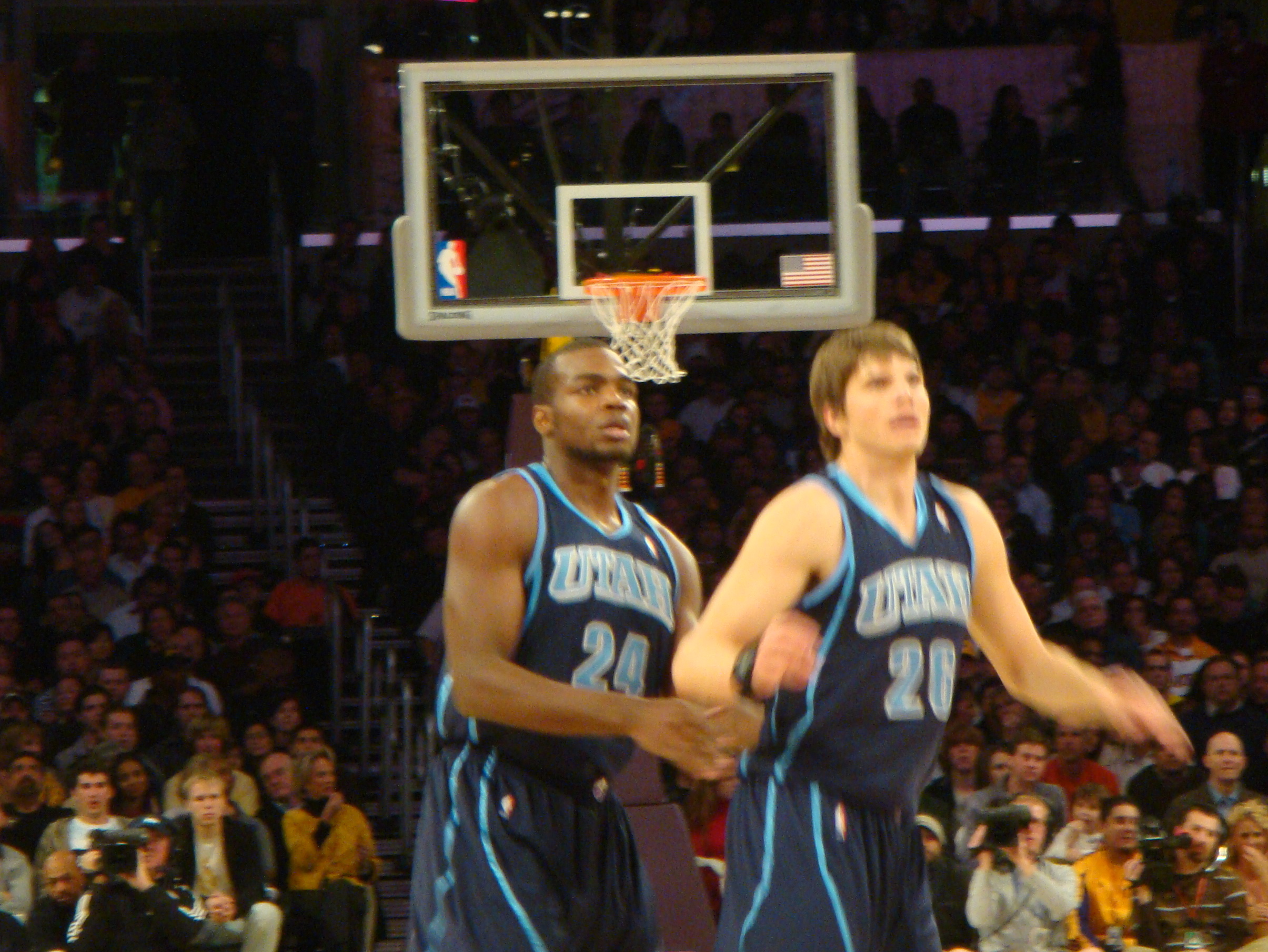
2 players in a Utah Jazz away game

The 2008–09 Utah Jazz season was the 35th season of the franchise in the National Basketball Association (NBA), and the 30th since the team moved from New Orleans to Salt Lake City for the 1979–80 season.

For the third straight year, the Jazz made the playoffs, but as the number 8 seed. The Jazz were quickly knocked out of the playoffs with a defeat to the Los Angeles Lakers in the opening round, losing in five games, and having their season ended by the Lakers for a second consecutive time. The Lakers would go on to win their 15th NBA Championship in the NBA Finals, defeating the Orlando Magic in five games.

== Key dates ==
- 2008:
  - June 26: The 2008 NBA draft took place in New York City.
  - July 1: The free agency period started.
- 2009:
  - February 19: The NBA trade deadline was 3:00 pm EST.
  - February 20: Jazz owner Larry H. Miller, who purchased a 50% interest in the Jazz in 1985 and acquired the remaining 50% a year later, dies from complications of type 2 diabetes.
  - February 21: To honor Larry H. Miller's death, the Jazz won a game a day after Larry's death by defeating the New Orleans Hornets 102–88.

== Offseason ==
Besides the draft, the only significant move that the Jazz made in the offseason was to trade third-string point guard Jason Hart to the Los Angeles Clippers in exchange for veteran journeyman point guard Brevin Knight on July 23.

== Draft picks ==
Round	Pick	Player	Position	Nationality	College
1	23	Kosta Koufos	Center	Greece	Ohio State
2	44	Ante Tomić	Power forward/Center	Croatia	KK Zagreb
2	53	Tadija Dragićević	Power forward	Serbia	Red Star Belgrade

== Roster ==
Utah Jazz roster
Players

Pos.	No.	Player	Height	Weight	DOB	From
SG	22	Morris Almond	6 ft 6 in (1.98 m)	225 lb (102 kg)	1985-02-02	Rice
PF	5	Carlos Boozer	6 ft 9 in (2.06 m)	258 lb (117 kg)	1981-11-20	Duke
SF	9	Ronnie Brewer	6 ft 7 in (2.01 m)	220 lb (100 kg)	1985-03-20	Arkansas
C	31	Jarron Collins	6 ft 11 in (2.11 m)	255 lb (116 kg)	1978-12-02	Stanford
C	44	Kyrylo Fesenko	7 ft 1 in (2.16 m)	288 lb (131 kg)	1986-12-24	Ukraine
SG	15	Matt Harpring	6 ft 7 in (2.01 m)	231 lb (105 kg)	1986-05-31	Georgia Tech
PF	47	Andrei Kirilenko	6 ft 9 in (2.06 m)	220 lb (100 kg)	1981-02-18	Russia
PG	2	Brevin Knight	5 ft 10 in (1.78 m)	173 lb (78 kg)	1975-11-08	Stanford
SF	26	Kyle Korver	6 ft 7 in (2.01 m)	210 lb (95 kg)	1981-03-17	Creighton
C	41	Kosta Koufos	7 ft 0 in (2.13 m)	265 lb (120 kg)	1989-02-24	Ohio State
SG	34	C. J. Miles	6 ft 6 in (1.98 m)	210 lb (95 kg)	1987-03-18	Skyline HS (TX)
PF	24	Paul Millsap	6 ft 8 in (2.03 m)	245 lb (111 kg)	1985-02-10	Louisiana Tech
C	13	Mehmet Okur	6 ft 11 in (2.11 m)	249 lb (113 kg)	1979-05-26	Turkey
PG	17	Ronnie Price	6 ft 2 in (1.88 m)	190 lb (86 kg)	1983-06-21	Utah Valley
PG	8	Deron Williams	6 ft 3 in (1.91 m)	210 lb (95 kg)	1984-06-26	Illinois

Coaches
Head coach
- Jerry Sloan
Assistant(s)
- Tyrone Corbin
- Phil Johnson
- Scott Layden
- Mark McKown

Legend
- (DP) Unsigned draft pick
- (FA) Free agent
- (S) Suspended
- Injured

Roster
Updated: April 27, 2009

== Regular season ==
=== Standings ===
Northwest Division	W	L	PCT	GB	Home	Road	Div	GP
y–Denver Nuggets	54	28	.659	—	33–8	21–20	12–4	82
x–Portland Trail Blazers	54	28	.659	—	34–7	20–21	11–5	82
x–Utah Jazz	48	34	.585	6	33–8	15–26	10–6	82
Minnesota Timberwolves	24	58	.293	30	11–30	13–28	3–13	82
Oklahoma City Thunder	23	59	.280	31	15–26	8–33	4–12	82

#	Western Conference				
#	Team	W	L	PCT	GB
1	c-Los Angeles Lakers	65	17	.793	—
2	y-Denver Nuggets	54	28	.659	11
3	y-San Antonio Spurs	54	28	.659	11
4	x-Portland Trail Blazers	54	28	.659	11
5	x-Houston Rockets	53	29	.646	12
6	x-Dallas Mavericks	50	32	.610	15
7	x-New Orleans Hornets	49	33	.598	16
8	x-Utah Jazz	48	34	.585	17
9	Phoenix Suns	46	36	.561	19
10	Golden State Warriors	29	53	.354	36
11	Memphis Grizzlies	24	58	.293	41
12	Minnesota Timberwolves	24	58	.293	41
13	Oklahoma City Thunder	23	59	.280	42
14	Los Angeles Clippers	19	63	.232	46
15	Sacramento Kings	17	65	.207	48

=== Game log ===
2008–09 game log
October: 1–0 (home: 1–0; road: 0–0)

Game	Date	Team	Score	High points	High rebounds	High assists	Location Attendance	Record
1	October 29	Denver	W 98–94	Carlos Boozer (25)	Carlos Boozer (14)	Ronnie Price (6)	EnergySolutions Arena; 19,911	1–0

November : 10–7 (home: 7–2; road: 3–5)

Game	Date	Team	Score	High points	High rebounds	High assists	Location Attendance	Record
2	November 1	L.A. Clippers	W 101–79	Carlos Boozer (25)	Carlos Boozer, Mehmet Okur (10)	Ronnie Price (7)	EnergySolutions Arena; 19,602	2–0
3	November 3	@ L.A. Clippers	W 89–73	Paul Millsap (24)	Andrei Kirilenko (11)	Ronnie Price (5)	Staples Center; 12,712	3–0
4	November 5	Portland	W 103–96	Mehmet Okur (22)	Mehmet Okur (9)	Brevin Knight (6)	EnergySolutions Arena; 19,911	4–0
5	November 7	Oklahoma City	W 104–97	Carlos Boozer (21)	Andrei Kirilenko (12)	Brevin Knight (11)	EnergySolutions Arena; 19,911	5–0
6	November 9	@ New York	L 99–107	Carlos Boozer (19)	Carlos Boozer (18)	Ronnie Brewer (7)	Madison Square Garden; 19,344	5–1
7	November 11	@ Philadelphia	W 93–80	Carlos Boozer (19)	Carlos Boozer (16)	Ronnie Brewer, Deron Williams (9)	Wachovia Center; 12,839	6–1
8	November 12	@ Washington	L 87–95	Carlos Boozer (20)	Carlos Boozer (7)	Deron Williams (7)	Verizon Center; 14,885	6–2
9	November 14	@ Charlotte	L 96–104	Carlos Boozer (26)	Carlos Boozer (15)	Ronnie Brewer, Brevin Knight (4)	Time Warner Cable Arena; 14,189	6–3
10	November 15	@ Cleveland	L 93–105	Carlos Boozer (17)	Carlos Boozer (9)	Brevin Knight (6)	Quicken Loans Arena; 20,562	6–4
11	November 17	Phoenix	W 109–97	Carlos Boozer, C. J. Miles (21)	Carlos Boozer (15)	Ronnie Price, Brevin Knight (6)	EnergySolutions Arena; 19,911	7–4
12	November 19	Milwaukee	W 105–94	C. J. Miles (25)	Carlos Boozer (11)	Ronnie Price (6)	EnergySolutions Arena; 19,911	8–4
13	November 21	@ San Antonio	L 94–119	Ronnie Brewer (17)	C. J. Miles (10)	C. J. Miles, Ronnie Price (5)	AT&T Center; 17,354	8–5
14	November 22	@ Memphis	W 103–94	Mehmet Okur (23)	Andrei Kirilenko (6)	Andrei Kirilenko (10)	FedExForum; 13,121	9–5
15	November 24	Chicago	L 100–101	Mehmet Okur (26)	Paul Millsap (10)	Ronnie Price, Andrei Kirilenko (8)	EnergySolutions Arena; 19,911	9–6
16	November 26	Memphis	W 117–100	Paul Millsap (24)	Paul Millsap (16)	Deron Williams (15)	EnergySolutions Arena; 19,911	10–6
17	November 28	Sacramento	W 120–94	Mehmet Okur (20)	Mehmet Okur (12)	Deron Williams (15)	EnergySolutions Arena; 19,911	11–6
18	November 29	New Jersey	L 88–105	Paul Millsap (20)	Mehmet Okur (11)	Deron Williams (13)	EnergySolutions Arena; 19,911	11–7

December : 8–7 (home: 4–2; road: 4–5)

Game	Date	Team	Score	High points	High rebounds	High assists	Location Attendance	Record
19	December 2	@ Sacramento	W 99–94	Kyle Korver (15)	Paul Millsap, Mehmet Okur (11)	Deron Williams (7)	ARCO Arena; 10,798	12–7
20	December 3	Miami	L 89–93	Paul Millsap (20)	Paul Millsap (13)	Deron Williams (5)	EnergySolutions Arena; 19,911	12–8
21	December 5	Toronto	W 114–87	Mehmet Okur (21)	Paul Millsap (11)	Paul Millsap (7)	EnergySolutions Arena; 19,911	13–8
22	December 6	@ Phoenix	L 104–106	C. J. Miles, Paul Millsap (20)	Mehmet Okur (13)	Deron Williams (15)	US Airways Center; 18,422	13–9
23	December 9	@ Minnesota	W 99–96	Ronnie Brewer (25)	Mehmet Okur (13)	Deron Williams (11)	Target Center; 10,745	14–9
24	December 11	Portland	W 97–88	Mehmet Okur (27)	Paul Millsap (12)	Deron Williams (11)	EnergySolutions Arena; 19,911	15–9
25	December 13	Orlando	L 94–103	Andrei Kirilenko, Deron Williams (17)	Paul Millsap (14)	Deron Williams (11)	EnergySolutions Arena; 19,911	15–10
26	December 15	@ Boston	L 91–100	Paul Millsap (32)	Paul Millsap (10)	Deron Williams (7)	TD Banknorth Garden; 18,624	15–11
27	December 17	@ New Jersey	W 103–92	Mehmet Okur (23)	Paul Millsap (12)	Deron Williams (11)	Izod Center; 12,542	16–11
28	December 19	@ Detroit	W 120–114 (2OT)	Deron Williams (29)	Paul Millsap (13)	Deron Williams (8)	The Palace of Auburn Hills; 22,076	17–11
29	December 20	@ Chicago	L 98–106	Mehmet Okur (23)	Mehmet Okur (13)	Deron Williams (6)	United Center; 22,046	17–12
30	December 23	@ Milwaukee	L 86–94	Andrei Kirilenko (22)	Andrei Kirilenko (11)	Deron Williams (8)	Bradley Center; 14,888	17–13
31	December 26	Dallas	W 97–88	Ronnie Brewer (21)	Andrei Kirilenko (14)	Deron Williams (13)	EnergySolutions Arena; 19,911	18–13
32	December 27	@ Houston	L 115–120 (2OT)	Ronnie Brewer (23)	Kyrylo Fesenko (11)	Deron Williams (11)	Toyota Center; 18,245	18–14
33	December 29	Philadelphia	W 112–95	Deron Williams (27)	Andrei Kirilenko (13)	Deron Williams (6)	EnergySolutions Arena; 19,911	19–14

January : 7–8 (home: 6–2; road: 1–6)

Game	Date	Team	Score	High points	High rebounds	High assists	Location Attendance	Record
34	January 2	@ L.A. Lakers	L 100–113	Mehmet Okur (21)	Paul Millsap (17)	Deron Williams (12)	Staples Center; 18,997	19–15
35	January 5	Golden State	W 119–114	Deron Williams (25)	Paul Millsap (14)	Deron Williams (15)	EnergySolutions Arena; 19,911	20–15
36	January 7	New Orleans	W 116–90	Paul Millsap (27)	Paul Millsap (14)	Deron Williams (8)	EnergySolutions Arena; 19,911	21–15
37	January 10	Detroit	W 99–82	Mehmet Okur (22)	Andrei Kirilenko, Paul Millsap (7)	Deron Williams (9)	EnergySolutions Arena; 19,911	22–15
38	January 12	Indiana	W 120–113	Mehmet Okur (43)	Andrei Kirilenko (12)	Deron Williams (11)	EnergySolutions Arena; 19,911	23–15
39	January 14	@ Oklahoma City	L 93–114	Deron Williams (25)	Mehmet Okur (9)	Deron Williams (6)	Ford Center; 18,437	23–16
40	January 16	@ Memphis	W 101–91	Deron Williams (27)	Mehmet Okur (8)	Deron Williams (12)	FedExForum; 10,422	24–16
41	January 17	@ Dallas	L 108–115	Deron Williams (30)	Mehmet Okur (11)	Deron Williams (9)	American Airlines Center; 20,325	24–17
42	January 20	Minnesota	W 112–107	Paul Millsap (28)	Paul Millsap (15)	Deron Williams (11)	EnergySolutions Arena; 19,911	25–17
43	January 21	@ Houston	L 99–108	Deron Williams (32)	Paul Millsap (12)	Deron Williams (11)	Toyota Center; 17,037	25–18
44	January 24	Cleveland	L 97–102	Paul Millsap (24)	Paul Millsap (15)	Deron Williams (16)	EnergySolutions Arena; 19,911	25–19
45	January 25	@ Denver	L 97–117	Ronnie Brewer (16)	Mehmet Okur, Paul Millsap (10)	Deron Williams (10)	Pepsi Center; 17,895	25–20
46	January 27	San Antonio	L 100–106	Ronnie Brewer (23)	Mehmet Okur (17)	Deron Williams (13)	EnergySolutions Arena; 19,911	25–21
47	January 30	Oklahoma City	W 110–90	Deron Williams (24)	Paul Millsap (9)	Deron Williams (12)	EnergySolutions Arena; 19,911	26–21
48	January 31	@ Portland	L 108–122	Deron Williams (35)	Mehmet Okur (7)	Deron Williams (5)	Rose Garden; 20,593	26–22

February : 10–1 (home: 8–0; road: 2–1)

Game	Date	Team	Score	High points	High rebounds	High assists	Location Attendance	Record
49	February 2	Charlotte	W 105–86	Mehmet Okur (22)	Kyle Korver (8)	Brevin Knight (7)	EnergySolutions Arena; 19,911	27–22
50	February 5	Dallas	W 115–87	Deron Williams (34)	Mehmet Okur (13)	Deron Williams (12)	EnergySolutions Arena; 19,911	28–22
51	February 6	@ Sacramento	W 111–107	Deron Williams (34)	Mehmet Okur (11)	Deron Williams (4)	ARCO Arena; 17,317	29–22
52	February 8	@ Golden State	L 96–116	Deron Williams (31)	Mehmet Okur (9)	Deron Williams (10)	Oracle Arena; 19,174	29–23
53	February 11	L.A. Lakers	W 113–109	Deron Williams (31)	Mehmet Okur, Paul Millsap (8)	Deron Williams (11)	EnergySolutions Arena; 19,911	30–23
54	February 17	Memphis	W 117–99	C. J. Miles (24)	Kyle Korver (9)	Deron Williams (15)	EnergySolutions Arena; 19,911	31–23
55	February 19	Boston	W 90–85	Mehmet Okur (19)	Paul Millsap (10)	Deron Williams (10)	EnergySolutions Arena; 19,911	32–23
56	February 21	New Orleans	W 102–88	Mehmet Okur (25)	Paul Millsap (10)	Deron Williams (13)	EnergySolutions Arena; 19,911	33–23
57	February 23	Atlanta	W 108–89	Ronnie Brewer (19)	Paul Millsap (12)	Deron Williams (10)	EnergySolutions Arena; 19,911	34–23
58	February 25	@ Minnesota	W 120–103	Mehmet Okur (25)	Paul Millsap (7)	Deron Williams (13)	Target Center; 13,108	35–23
59	February 28	Sacramento	W 102–89	Ronnie Brewer, Mehmet Okur (26)	Paul Millsap (12)	Deron Williams (11)	EnergySolutions Arena; 19,911	36–23

March : 10–5 (home: 6–0; road: 4–5)

Game	Date	Team	Score	High points	High rebounds	High assists	Location Attendance	Record
60	March 1	@ Golden State	W 112–104	Mehmet Okur (23)	Ronnie Brewer, Carlos Boozer (9)	Deron Williams (20)	Oracle Arena; 18,347	37–23
61	March 4	Houston	W 101–94	Deron Williams (26)	Carlos Boozer (17)	Deron Williams (14)	EnergySolutions Arena; 19,911	38–23
62	March 6	Denver	W 97–91	Deron Williams (25)	Carlos Boozer (16)	Deron Williams (11)	EnergySolutions Arena; 19,911	39–23
63	March 8	@ Toronto	W 109–101	Deron Williams (25)	Mehmet Okur, Paul Millsap (11)	Deron Williams (9)	Air Canada Centre; 18,541	40–23
64	March 10	@ Indiana	W 112–100	Mehmet Okur (24)	Paul Millsap (9)	Deron Williams (12)	Conseco Fieldhouse; 13,705	41–23
65	March 11	@ Atlanta	L 93–100	Deron Williams (20)	Mehmet Okur (10)	Deron Williams (9)	Philips Arena; 13,112	41–24
66	March 14	@ Miami	L 129–140 (3OT)	Deron Williams (30)	Carlos Boozer (13)	Deron Williams (13)	American Airlines Arena; 19,600	41–25
67	March 15	@ Orlando	L 87–105	Carlos Boozer (23)	Carlos Boozer (13)	Deron Williams (9)	Amway Arena; 17,461	41–26
68	March 17	Washington	W 103–88	Kyle Korver (15)	Carlos Boozer (15)	Deron Williams (8)	EnergySolutions Arena; 19,911	42–26
69	March 20	@ Oklahoma City	W 101–94	Deron Williams (24)	Carlos Boozer (10)	Deron Williams (11)	Ford Center; 19,136	43–26
70	March 24	Houston	W 99–86	Deron Williams (19)	Paul Millsap (9)	Deron Williams (12)	EnergySolutions Arena; 19,911	44–26
71	March 25	@ Phoenix	L 114–118	Deron Williams (25)	Mehmet Okur, Carlos Boozer (12)	Deron Williams (10)	US Airways Center; 18,422	44–27
72	March 28	Phoenix	W 104–99 (OT)	Mehmet Okur (26)	Mehmet Okur (11)	Deron Williams (13)	EnergySolutions Arena; 19,911	45–27
73	March 30	New York	W 112–104	Deron Williams (24)	Carlos Boozer (11)	Deron Williams (13)	EnergySolutions Arena; 19,911	46–27
74	March 31	@ Portland	L 104–125	Carlos Boozer (20)	Andrei Kirilenko (7)	Deron Williams (8)	Rose Garden; 20,675	46–28

April : 2–6 (home: 1–2; road: 1–4)

Game	Date	Team	Score	High points	High rebounds	High assists	Location Attendance	Record
75	April 2	@ Denver	L 104–114	C. J. Miles (19)	Mehmet Okur (15)	Deron Williams (10)	Pepsi Center; 17,969	46–29
76	April 3	Minnesota	L 102–103	Deron Williams (34)	Mehmet Okur, Paul Millsap (6)	Deron Williams (11)	EnergySolutions Arena; 19,911	46–30
77	April 5	@ New Orleans	W 108–94	Ronnie Brewer (23)	Carlos Boozer (10)	Deron Williams (11)	New Orleans Arena; 17,362	47–30
78	April 8	@ Dallas	L 101–130	Deron Williams (18)	Carlos Boozer (11)	Deron Williams (12)	American Airlines Center; 20,017	47–31
79	April 10	@ San Antonio	L 99–105	Deron Williams (25)	Mehmet Okur (10)	Deron Williams (10)	AT&T Center; 18,797	47–32
80	April 11	Golden State	L 108–118	Deron Williams (26)	Carlos Boozer (12)	Deron Williams (14)	EnergySolutions Arena; 19,911	47–33
81	April 13	L.A. Clippers	W 106–85	Carlos Boozer (20)	Carlos Boozer (13)	Deron Williams (9)	EnergySolutions Arena; 19,911	48–33
82	April 14	@ L.A. Lakers	L 112–125	Deron Williams (25)	Carlos Boozer (9)	Deron Williams (13)	Staples Center; 18,997	48–34

2015–16 season schedule

== Playoffs ==
=== West First Round ===
(1) Los Angeles Lakers vs. (8) Utah Jazz

ABC

April 19
3:00 p.m.

Recap

Utah Jazz 100, Los Angeles Lakers 113
Scoring by quarter: 19–30, 21–32, 33–24, 27–27
Pts: Carlos Boozer 27; Rebs: Carlos Boozer 9 Asts: Deron Williams 17	Pts: Kobe Bryant 24; Rebs: Pau Gasol 9 Asts: Kobe Bryant 8

Staples Center, Los Angeles
Attendance: 18,997
Referees: Derrick Stafford, Ed Malloy, Joe Crawford

TNT

April 21
10:30 p.m.

Recap

Utah Jazz 109, Los Angeles Lakers 119
Scoring by quarter: 29–41, 26–25, 23–23, 31–30
Pts: Deron Williams 35; Rebs: Carlos Boozer 10; Asts: Deron Williams 10	Pts: Kobe Bryant 26; Rebs: Gasol, Bryant 6 each Asts: Ariza, Bryant 9 each

Staples Center, Los Angeles
Attendance: 18,997
Referees: Marc Davis, Sean Corbin, Monty McCutchen

TNT

April 23
10:30 p.m.

Recap

Los Angeles Lakers 86, Utah Jazz 88
Scoring by quarter: 17–26, 22–17, 29–17, 18–28
Pts: Lamar Odom 21; Rebs: Lamar Odom 14; Asts: Kobe Bryant 6	Pts: Carlos Boozer 23; Rebs: Carlos Boozer 22; Asts: Deron Williams 9

EnergySolutions Arena, Salt Lake City
Attendance: 19,911
Referees: Bennett Salvadore, Mike Callahan, Eric Lewis

ESPN

April 25
9:00 p.m.

Recap

Los Angeles Lakers 108, Utah Jazz 94
Scoring by quarter: 20–25, 40–28, 28–16, 20–25
Pts: Kobe Bryant 38; Rebs: Lamar Odom 15; Asts: Lamar Odom 6	Pts: Williams, Boozer 23 each Rebs: Carlos Boozer 16; Asts: Deron Williams 13

EnergySolutions Arena, Salt Lake City
Attendance: 19,911
Referees: Bill Spooner, Mark Wunderlich, Joe Derosa

TNT

April 27
10:30 p.m.

Recap

Utah Jazz 96, Los Angeles Lakers 107
Scoring by quarter: 26–26, 17–30, 20–26, 33–25
Pts: Paul Millsap 16; Rebs: Mehmet Okur 8 Asts: Deron Williams 6	Pts: Kobe Bryant 31; Rebs: Lamar Odom 15; Asts: Odom, Bryant, Ariza, Gasol 4 each
Los Angeles win series, 4–1

Staples Center, Los Angeles
Attendance: 18,997
Referees: Gary Zielinski, James Capers, Steve Javie

Last Playoff Meeting: 2008 Western Conference Semi-finals (Los Angeles won 4–2)

== Player statistics ==
Legend
GP	Games played	GS	Games started	MPG	Minutes per game
FG%	Field-goal percentage	3P%	3-point field-goal percentage	FT%	Free-throw percentage
RPG	Rebounds per game	APG	Assists per game	SPG	Steals per game
BPG	Blocks per game	PPG	Points per game

=== Regular season ===
Player	GP	GS	MPG	FG%	3P%	FT%	RPG	APG	SPG	BPG	PPG
Deron Williams	68	68	36.8	.471	.310	.849	2.9	10.7	1.07	.29	19.4
Mehmet Okur	72	72	33.5	.485	.446	.817	7.7	1.7	.75	.74	17.0
Carlos Boozer	37	37	32.4	.490	.000	.698	10.4	2.1	1.05	.19	16.2
Ronnie Brewer	81	80	32.2	.508	.259	.702	3.7	2.2	1.70	.37	13.7
Paul Millsap	76	38	30.1	.534	.000	.699	8.6	1.8	1.03	.96	13.5
Andrei Kirilenko	67	10	27.3	.449	.274	.785	4.8	2.6	1.24	1.15	11.6
C.J. Miles	72	72	22.5	.459	.352	.876	2.3	1.5	.64	.21	9.1
Kyle Korver	78	2	24.0	.438	.386	.882	3.3	1.8	.60	.38	9.0
Kosta Koufos	48	7	11.8	.508	.000	.706	2.9	.4	.25	.65	4.7
Matt Harpring	63	2	11.0	.461	.000	.764	2.0	.4	.46	.14	4.4
Ronnie Price	52	17	14.2	.379	.311	.756	1.3	2.1	.75	.10	4.0
Morris Almond	25	1	10.2	.407	.294	.808	1.4	.3	.16	.16	3.7
Brevin Knight	74	0	12.7	.349	.000	.750	1.2	2.6	.92	.05	2.4
Kyrylo Fesenko	21	1	7.4	.583	.000	.333	1.8	.2	.33	.71	2.1
Jarron Collins	26	3	7.7	.457	.000	.727	1.4	.3	.08	.04	1.5

=== Playoffs ===
Player	GP	GS	MPG	FG%	3P%	FT%	RPG	APG	SPG	BPG	PPG
Deron Williams	5	5	42.2	.414	.360	.829	3.8	10.8	1.8	.4	20.2
Carlos Boozer	5	5	37.2	.528		.771	13.2	2.2	1.6	.4	20.6
Ronnie Brewer	5	5	31.6	.408	.000	.688	4.6	2.6	1.4	.2	10.2
Andrei Kirilenko	5	3	27.2	.468	.200	.714	2.8	2.0	2.2	.6	11.0
Kyle Korver	5	2	27.2	.391	.462	.714	2.2	2.6	.6	.2	10.6
Paul Millsap	5	0	31.0	.510		.500	8.0	1.6	.8	1.0	11.8
C. J. Miles	5	0	11.6	.300	.250	.750	1.4	.2	.4	.2	3.4
Matt Harpring	5	0	9.8	.500	.000	1.000	1.8	.8	.4	.2	4.8
Brevin Knight	5	0	3.4	.000			.2	.6	.2	.0	.0
Jarron Collins	3	3	11.7	.200		.750	3.3	.3	.3	.0	2.7
Mehmet Okur	2	2	21.5	.167	.333	.750	5.0	2.0	.0	.5	4.0
Ronnie Price	2	0	8.0	.300	.000	1.000	1.5	2.5	.5	.0	4.0

== Transactions ==
=== Trades ===
July 23, 2008	To Utah Jazz Brevin Knight	To Los Angeles Clippers Jason Hart

=== Free agents ===
==== Subtractions ====
Player	Left	Team
Dee Brown	July 10, 2008	Washington Wizards
