= Travis Outlaw =

American basketball player (born 1984)

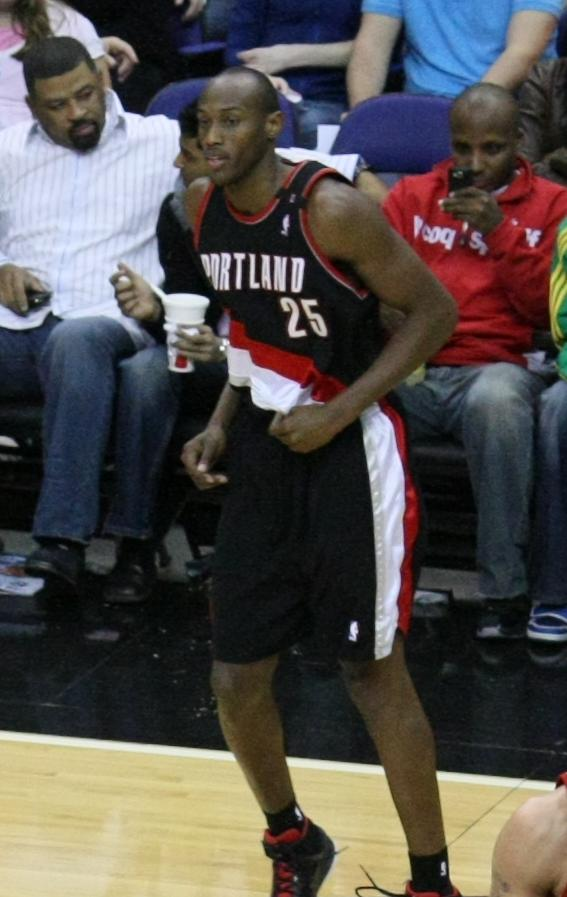
- Outlaw in 2008 with the Trail Blazers

Personal information
- Born: September 18, 1984 (age 42) Starkville, Mississippi, U.S.
- Listed height: 6 ft 9 in (2.06 m)
- Listed weight: 207 lb (94 kg)

Career information
- High school: Starkville (Starkville, Mississippi)
- NBA draft: 2003: 1st round, 23rd overall pick
- Drafted by: Portland Trail Blazers
- Playing career: 2003–2014
- Position: Small forward / power forward
- Number: 25, 34, 21

Career history
- 2003–2010: Portland Trail Blazers
- 2010: Los Angeles Clippers
- 2010–2011: New Jersey Nets
- 2011–2014: Sacramento Kings

Career highlights
- Second-team Parade All-American (2003); McDonald's All-American (2003)

Career NBA statistics
- Points: 5,273 (8.5 ppg)
- Rebounds: 1,974 (3.2 rpg)
- Blocks: 514 (0.6 bpg)
- Stats at NBA.com
- Stats at Basketball Reference

Travis Marquez "Bonesaw" Outlaw (born September 18, 1984) is an American former professional basketball player who played eleven seasons in the National Basketball Association (NBA).

== Early life ==
Outlaw attended Starkville High School, where he played for the Starkville Yellowjackets high school basketball team. Considered a five-star recruit by Rivals.com, he was listed as the No. 7 small forward and the No. 13 player in the nation in 2003.

== Professional career ==
=== Portland Trail Blazers (2003–2010) ===
Entering the 2003 NBA draft directly out of high school, Outlaw was a first round selection (23rd pick overall) by the Portland Trail Blazers. He averaged 8.6 points on 44.2% field goal shooting and 3.2 rebounds per game during his first five years in the NBA.

In the 2005 NBA Summer League, Outlaw averaged 18.7 points and 6.3 rebounds in 35.5 minutes. The performance earned him First Team All-RVSL honors. Following the NBA summer league, several teams offered to trade for Outlaw in exchange for a first-round draft pick. Former Portland Trail Blazers director of player personnel Kevin Pritchard said that Travis "... [is] going to be with us for a long time. I feel comfortable enough to say he's going to be a special player."

On April 18, 2007, Outlaw set a new career-high with 36 points against the Golden State Warriors. He became a restricted free agent on July 1, 2007, and signed a three-year contract extension on July 17.

=== Los Angeles Clippers (2010) ===
In February 2010, the Trail Blazers traded Outlaw, Steve Blake and $1.5 million in cash to the Los Angeles Clippers for Marcus Camby.

=== New Jersey Nets (2010–2011) ===
On July 8, 2010, Outlaw signed a 5-year deal worth $35 million with the New Jersey Nets.

On December 15, 2011, the New Jersey Nets waived Outlaw under the amnesty provision.

=== Sacramento Kings (2011–2014) ===
On December 17, 2011, Outlaw was claimed by the Sacramento Kings off waivers.

Outlaw's final NBA game ended up being during his tenure with Sacramento, as his final game was on April 16, 2014 in a 99 - 104 loss to the Phoenix Suns. Outlaw played for 24 and a half minutes off the bench and recorded 15 points, 5 rebounds and 2 assists.

On August 6, 2014, Outlaw was traded, along with Quincy Acy, to the New York Knicks in exchange for Wayne Ellington and Jeremy Tyler. On October 27, 2014, Outlaw was traded, along with a 2019 second-round draft selection and the option exchange 2018 second-round draft selections, to the Philadelphia 76ers in exchange for Arnett Moultrie. He was waived by the 76ers later that day.

== Personal life ==
On August 14, 2016, Outlaw was arrested and charged with felony marijuana possession in his hometown of Starkville, Mississippi. On May 5, 2017, Outlaw pleaded guilty to felony marijuana possession and was sentenced to serve two years of non-adjudicated probation.

== NBA career statistics ==
Legend
GP	Games played	GS	Games started	MPG	Minutes per game
FG%	Field goal percentage	3P%	3-point field goal percentage	FT%	Free throw percentage
RPG	Rebounds per game	APG	Assists per game	SPG	Steals per game
BPG	Blocks per game	PPG	Points per game	**Bold**	Career high
*	Led the league

=== Regular season ===
Year	Team	GP	GS	MPG	FG%	3P%	FT%	RPG	APG	SPG	BPG	PPG
2003–04	Portland	8	0	2.4	.429	.000	.500	.5	.1	.1	.0	1.0
2004–05	Portland	59	2	13.4	**.498**	**.400**	.653	2.1	.6	.5	.7	5.4
2005–06	Portland	69	11	16.7	.440	.264	.697	2.7	.5	.4	.7	5.8
2006–07	Portland	67	1	22.9	.434	.270	.790	3.2	.8	**.9**	**1.1**	5.9
2007–08	Portland	**82***	6	26.7	.433	.396	.741	**4.6**	**1.3**	.7	.8	**13.3**
2008–09	Portland	81	6	27.7	.453	.377	.723	4.1	1.0	.6	.7	12.8
2009–10	Portland	11	0	21.0	.376	.387	**.875**	3.5	.7	.6	.7	9.9
2009–10	L.A. Clippers	23	6	21.7	.400	.378	.800	3.6	1.1	.5	.4	4.5
2010–11	New Jersey	**82**	**55**	**28.8**	.375	.302	.772	4.0	1.0	.4	.4	6.3
2011–12	Sacramento	39	5	12.8	.343	.267	.674	1.6	.4	.5	.5	4.3
2012–13	Sacramento	38	2	11.7	.418	.280	.731	1.6	.6	.3	.2	5.3
2013–14	Sacramento	63	4	16.9	.399	.350	.808	2.7	.8	.3	.3	5.4
Career		622	98	20.9	.423	.337	.744	3.2	.8	.5	.6	8.5

=== Playoffs ===
Year	Team	GP	GS	MPG	FG%	3P%	FT%	RPG	APG	SPG	BPG	PPG
2009	Portland	6	0	28.3	.318	.250	.667	3.0	.5	.8	.7	9.0
Career		6	0	28.3	.318	.250	.667	3.0	.5	.8	.7	9.0
