= 2008–09 Portland Trail Blazers season =

NBA professional basketball team season

- Head coach: Nate McMillan
- General manager: Kevin Pritchard; Tom Penn (assistant)
- Owner: Paul Allen
- Arena: Rose Garden

Results
- Record: 54–28 (.659)
- Place: Division: 2nd (Northwest); Conference: 4th (Western)
- Playoff finish: First round (lost to Rockets 2–4)
- Stats at Basketball Reference

Local media
- Television: KGW; CSN Northwest
- Radio: KXTG

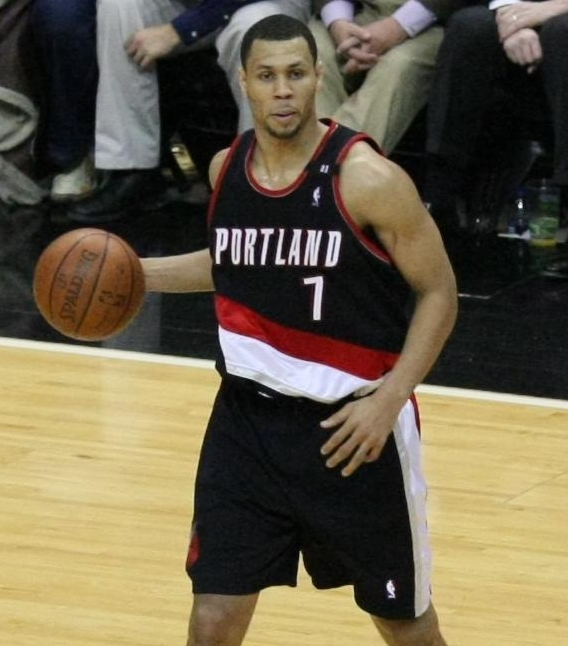
Brandon Roy playing with the Portland Trail Blazers, 2008.

The 2008–09 Portland Trail Blazers season was the 39th season of the franchise in the National Basketball Association (NBA). In the playoffs, the Trail Blazers lost to the Houston Rockets in six games in the first round. The 2008-09 Trail Blazers had the best team offensive rating in the NBA.

== Key dates ==
- June 26: The 2008 NBA draft took place in New York City.
- July 1: The free agency period started.

== Offseason ==
- An MRI revealed that Trail Blazers guard Brandon Roy needed arthroscopic surgery to repair a tear in the meniscus of his left knee. The surgery was scheduled for Thursday, August 14.

== Draft picks ==
Round	Pick	Player	Position	Nationality	College / club team
1	13	Brandon Rush (traded to Indiana)	Guard/Forward	United States	Kansas
1	27	Darrell Arthur (traded to Houston)	Power Forward	United States	Kansas
2	33	Joey Dorsey (traded to Houston)	Center	United States	Memphis
2	36	Ömer Aşık (traded to Chicago)	Center	Turkey	Fenerbahçe Ülker (Turkey)
2	55	Mike Taylor (traded to LA Clippers)	Point Guard	United States	Iowa State

=== Draft Day trades ===
- Brandon Rush, Jarrett Jack, and Josh McRoberts were traded to the Indiana Pacers for Jerryd Bayless and Ike Diogu
- Darrell Arthur and Joey Dorsey were traded to the Houston Rockets for Nicolas Batum
- Ömer Aşık was traded to the Chicago Bulls for three future second round draft picks
- Mike Taylor was traded to the L.A. Clippers for a future second round draft pick

== Roster ==
2008–09 Portland Trail Blazers roster
Players

Pos.	No.	Player	Height	Weight	DOB	From
PF	12	LaMarcus Aldridge	6 ft 10 in (2.08 m)	225 lb (102 kg)	1985-07-19	Texas
SF	88	Nicolas Batum	6 ft 8 in (2.03 m)	200 lb (91 kg)	1988-12-14	France
PG	4	Jerryd Bayless	6 ft 2 in (1.88 m)	200 lb (91 kg)	1988-08-20	Arizona
PG	2	Steve Blake	6 ft 3 in (1.91 m)	172 lb (78 kg)	1980-02-26	Maryland
SG	5	Rudy Fernández	6 ft 5 in (1.96 m)	185 lb (84 kg)	1985-04-04	Spain
F/C	44	Channing Frye	6 ft 11 in (2.11 m)	245 lb (111 kg)	1983-05-17	Arizona
F/C	9	Raef LaFrentz	7 ft 0 in (2.13 m)	240 lb (109 kg)	1976-05-29	Kansas
C	52	Greg Oden	7 ft 0 in (2.13 m)	285 lb (129 kg)	1988-01-22	Ohio State
F	25	Travis Outlaw	6 ft 9 in (2.06 m)	207 lb (94 kg)	1984-09-18	Starkville HS (MS)
C	10	Joel Przybilla	7 ft 1 in (2.16 m)	245 lb (111 kg)	1979-10-10	Minnesota
PF	42	Shavlik Randolph	6 ft 9 in (2.06 m)	240 lb (109 kg)	1983-11-24	Duke
PG	11	Sergio Rodríguez	6 ft 3 in (1.91 m)	176 lb (80 kg)	1986-06-12	Spain
SG	7	Brandon Roy	6 ft 6 in (1.98 m)	211 lb (96 kg)	1984-07-23	Washington
PF	51	Michael Ruffin	6 ft 8 in (2.03 m)	248 lb (112 kg)	1977-01-21	Tulsa
SF	8	Martell Webster	6 ft 7 in (2.01 m)	235 lb (107 kg)	1986-12-04	Seattle Prep HS (WA)

Coaches
Head coach
- Nate McMillan
Assistant(s)
- Dean Demopoulos
- Maurice Lucas
- Joe Prunty
- Monty Williams

Legend
- (DP) Unsigned draft pick
- (FA) Free agent
- (S) Suspended
- Injured

Roster
Updated: February 18, 2009

== Preseason ==
2008 preseason game log
Preseason

Game	Date	Team	Score	High points	High rebounds	High assists	Location Attendance	Record
1	October 7	Sacramento Kings	W 110–81	Webster (15)	Przybilla (12)	Roy, Rodríguez (7)	Rose Garden; 19,321	1–0
2	October 8	Golden State Warriors	L 95–110	Fernández (15)	Oden (9)	Rodríguez (10)	Rose Garden; 17,847	1–1
3	October 10	Atlanta Hawks	W 102–80	S. Randolph (19)	S. Randolph (10)	Rodríguez, Bayless (7)	Sprint Center; 12,457	2–1
4	October 12	Utah Jazz	L 80–93	Batum (16)	L. Jackson (7)	Rodríguez (8)	Rose Garden; 19,980	2–2
5	October 20	Sacramento Kings	W 112–98	Aldridge (24)	Oden (9)	Aldridge (5)	ARCO Arena; 8,632	3–2
6	October 22	Los Angeles Clippers	W 87–75	Roy (17)	Oden (13)	Blake (6)	Staples Center; 10,882	4–2
7	October 23	Utah Jazz	L 89–100	Frye (17)	Frye (10)	Rodríguez (7)	EnergySolutions Arena; 19,169	4–3

2008–09 preseason schedule

== Regular season ==
=== Standings ===
Northwest Division	W	L	PCT	GB	Home	Road	Div	GP
y–Denver Nuggets	54	28	.659	—	33–8	21–20	12–4	82
x–Portland Trail Blazers	54	28	.659	—	34–7	20–21	11–5	82
x–Utah Jazz	48	34	.585	6	33–8	15–26	10–6	82
Minnesota Timberwolves	24	58	.293	30	11–30	13–28	3–13	82
Oklahoma City Thunder	23	59	.280	31	15–26	8–33	4–12	82

#	Western Conference				
#	Team	W	L	PCT	GB
1	c-Los Angeles Lakers	65	17	.793	—
2	y-Denver Nuggets	54	28	.659	11
3	y-San Antonio Spurs	54	28	.659	11
4	x-Portland Trail Blazers	54	28	.659	11
5	x-Houston Rockets	53	29	.646	12
6	x-Dallas Mavericks	50	32	.610	15
7	x-New Orleans Hornets	49	33	.598	16
8	x-Utah Jazz	48	34	.585	17
9	Phoenix Suns	46	36	.561	19
10	Golden State Warriors	29	53	.354	36
11	Memphis Grizzlies	24	58	.293	41
12	Minnesota Timberwolves	24	58	.293	41
13	Oklahoma City Thunder	23	59	.280	42
14	Los Angeles Clippers	19	63	.232	46
15	Sacramento Kings	17	65	.207	48

=== Game log ===
2008–09 game log
October: 1–1 (home: 1–0; road: 0–1)

Game	Date	Team	Score	High points	High rebounds	High assists	Location Attendance	Record
1	October 28	@ L.A. Lakers	L 76–96	Travis Outlaw (18)	Joel Przybilla (11)	Brandon Roy (5)	Staples Center; 18,997	0–1
2	October 31	San Antonio	W 100–99	Brandon Roy (26)	Rudy Fernández (8)	Brandon Roy (7)	Rose Garden; 20,516	1–1

November: 11–5 (home: 6–0; road: 5–5)

Game	Date	Team	Score	High points	High rebounds	High assists	Location Attendance	Record
3	November 1	@ Phoenix	L 96–107	Brandon Roy, Rudy Fernández (20)	Joel Przybilla (9)	Brandon Roy, Travis Outlaw, Sergio Rodríguez (4)	US Airways Center; 18,422	1–2
4	November 5	@ Utah	L 96–103	Brandon Roy, LaMarcus Aldridge (18)	Joel Przybilla (16)	Brandon Roy (6)	EnergySolutions Arena; 19,911	1–3
5	November 6	Houston	W 101–99 (OT)	LaMarcus Aldridge (27)	Travis Outlaw (13)	Steve Blake (8)	Rose Garden; 20,611	2–3
6	November 8	Minnesota	W 97–93	LaMarcus Aldridge, Brandon Roy (24)	LaMarcus Aldridge (13)	Brandon Roy (9)	Rose Garden; 20,599	3–3
7	November 10	@ Orlando	W 106–99	Brandon Roy (27)	LaMarcus Aldridge (11)	Steve Blake, Brandon Roy, Sergio Rodríguez (4)	Amway Arena; 14,210	4–3
8	November 12	@ Miami	W 104–96	Rudy Fernández (25)	Joel Przybilla (10)	Sergio Rodríguez (5)	American Airlines Arena; 15,021	5–3
9	November 14	@ New Orleans	L 82–87	Brandon Roy (21)	Greg Oden (11)	Sergio Rodríguez (7)	New Orleans Arena; 16,071	5–4
10	November 15	@ Minnesota	W 88–83	Brandon Roy (24)	Greg Oden, Joel Przybilla (8)	Brandon Roy (6)	Target Center; 12,213	6–4
11	November 18	@ Golden State	L 106–111	Brandon Roy, Greg Oden (22)	Greg Oden (10)	Brandon Roy (9)	Oracle Arena; 18,284	6–5
12	November 19	Chicago	W 116–74	Brandon Roy (20)	Greg Oden (10)	Sergio Rodríguez (9)	Rose Garden; 20,599	7–5
13	November 21	@ Sacramento	W 117–96	Steve Blake (20)	Joel Przybilla (10)	Steve Blake (5)	ARCO Arena; 12,056	8–5
14	November 22	@ Phoenix	L 92–102	Brandon Roy (26)	Channing Frye, Joel Przybilla (8)	Steve Blake (5)	US Airways Center; 18,422	8–6
15	November 24	Sacramento	W 91–90	Brandon Roy (28)	Joel Przybilla (12)	Steve Blake (5)	Rose Garden; 20,467	9–6
16	November 26	Miami	W 106–68	Channing Frye (17)	Greg Oden (10)	Sergio Rodríguez (11)	Rose Garden; 20,528	10–6
17	November 28	New Orleans	W 101–86	Brandon Roy (25)	Greg Oden (8)	Brandon Roy (10)	Rose Garden; 20,638	11–6
18	November 30	@ Detroit	W 96–85	LaMarcus Aldridge (27)	Greg Oden (13)	Steve Blake (7)	The Palace of Auburn Hills; 22,076	12–6

December: 8–6 (home: 5–3; road: 3–3)

Game	Date	Team	Score	High points	High rebounds	High assists	Location Attendance	Record
19	December 2	@ New York	W 104–97	Brandon Roy (23)	Joel Przybilla (14)	Steve Blake (6)	Madison Square Garden; 18,664	13–6
20	December 3	@ Washington	W 98–92	Brandon Roy (22)	Greg Oden (10)	Sergio Rodríguez (7)	Verizon Center; 12,802	14–6
21	December 5	@ Boston	L 78–93	Travis Outlaw, LaMarcus Aldridge (13)	Joel Przybilla (8)	Steve Blake (4)	TD Banknorth Garden; 18,624	14–7
22	December 7	@ Toronto	W 98–97	LaMarcus Aldridge (20)	Greg Oden (10)	Brandon Roy (7)	Air Canada Centre; 17,671	15–7
23	December 9	Orlando	L 108–109	Brandon Roy (30)	LaMarcus Aldridge (13)	Sergio Rodríguez (7)	Rose Garden; 20,642	15–8
24	December 11	@ Utah	L 88–97	Brandon Roy (33)	Greg Oden (9)	Steve Blake (5)	EnergySolutions Arena; 19,911	15–9
25	December 12	L.A. Clippers	L 112–120 (2OT)	Brandon Roy (38)	Greg Oden (15)	Brandon Roy (9)	Rose Garden; 20,558	15–10
26	December 16	Sacramento	W 109–77	Brandon Roy (29)	Joel Przybilla (14)	Sergio Rodríguez, Brandon Roy (5)	Rose Garden; 20,005	16–10
27	December 18	Phoenix	W 124–119	Brandon Roy (52)	Travis Outlaw, Joel Przybilla (6)	Steve Blake (10)	Rose Garden; 20,650	17–10
28	December 22	@ Denver	L 89–97	LaMarcus Aldridge (20)	Joel Przybilla (8)	Brandon Roy (5)	Pepsi Center; 18,611	17–11
29	December 23	Denver	W 101–92	LaMarcus Aldridge (22)	Joel Przybilla (19)	Brandon Roy (6)	Rose Garden; 20,007	18–11
30	December 25	Dallas	L 94–102	Brandon Roy (22)	Brandon Roy, Joel Przybilla, Greg Oden (5)	Steve Blake (7)	Rose Garden; 20,643	18–12
31	December 27	Toronto	W 102–89	Brandon Roy (32)	Greg Oden (10)	Brandon Roy (9)	Rose Garden; 20,588	19–12
32	December 30	Boston	W 91–86	Steve Blake (21)	Greg Oden (11)	Steve Blake, Greg Oden (3)	Rose Garden; 20,651	20–12

January: 9–5 (home: 6–2; road: 3–3)

Game	Date	Team	Score	High points	High rebounds	High assists	Location Attendance	Record
33	January 2	New Orleans	L 77–92	Rudy Fernández (19)	LaMarcus Aldridge (10)	Steve Blake (6)	Rose Garden; 20,708	20–13
34	January 4	@ L.A. Lakers	L 86–100	LaMarcus Aldridge (22)	LaMarcus Aldridge (11)	Nicolas Batum, Sergio Rodríguez, Jerryd Bayless, LaMarcus Aldridge (4)	Staples Center; 18,997	20–14
35	January 7	Detroit	W 84–83	LaMarcus Aldridge (26)	Joel Przybilla (7)	Steve Blake (10)	Rose Garden; 20,644	21–14
36	January 10	Golden State	W 113–100	LaMarcus Aldridge (26)	Greg Oden (8)	Rudy Fernández (6)	Rose Garden; 20,687	22–14
37	January 12	@ Chicago	W 109–95	Travis Outlaw (33)	Greg Oden (13)	Steve Blake (10)	United Center; 18,996	23–14
38	January 14	@ Philadelphia	L 79–100	Brandon Roy (27)	LaMarcus Aldridge, Joel Przybilla (9)	Brandon Roy (6)	Wachovia Center; 14,561	23–15
39	January 15	@ New Jersey	W 105–99	Brandon Roy (29)	Joel Przybilla (11)	Brandon Roy (5)	Izod Center; 13,824	24–15
40	January 17	@ Charlotte	L 97–102 (OT)	LaMarcus Aldridge (21)	Joel Przybilla (10)	Brandon Roy (6)	Time Warner Cable Arena; 17,482	24–16
41	January 19	Milwaukee	W 102–85	Greg Oden (24)	Greg Oden (15)	Sergio Rodríguez, Brandon Roy (7)	Rose Garden; 20,580	25–16
42	January 21	Cleveland	L 98–104	Brandon Roy (23)	Joel Przybilla (15)	Sergio Rodríguez (5)	Rose Garden; 20,632	25–17
43	January 24	Washington	W 100–87	Brandon Roy (22)	Greg Oden (14)	Sergio Rodríguez (8)	Rose Garden; 20,566	26–17
44	January 26	@ L.A. Clippers	W 113–88	Brandon Roy (33)	Joel Przybilla (8)	Jerryd Bayless (6)	Staples Center; 16,570	27–17
45	January 28	Charlotte	W 88–74	LaMarcus Aldridge (25)	Greg Oden (14)	Sergio Rodríguez (7)	Rose Garden; 20,380	28–17
46	January 31	Utah	W 122–108	Brandon Roy (30)	Joel Przybilla (17)	Sergio Rodríguez (7)	Rose Garden; 20,593	29–17

February: 7–5 (home: 5–0; road: 2–5)

Game	Date	Team	Score	High points	High rebounds	High assists	Location Attendance	Record
47	February 2	@ New Orleans	W 97–89	LaMarcus Aldridge (22)	LaMarcus Aldridge (11)	Jerryd Bayless (6)	New Orleans Arena; 14,781	30–17
48	February 4	@ Dallas	L 99–104	Brandon Roy (26)	Brandon Roy (7)	Jerryd Bayless, Travis Outlaw (4)	American Airlines Center; 19,767	30–18
49	February 6	@ Oklahoma City	L 93–102	Brandon Roy (32)	Brandon Roy (9)	Brandon Roy (6)	Ford Center; 18,694	30–19
50	February 8	New York	W 109–108	Travis Outlaw (23)	Greg Oden (12)	Brandon Roy (8)	Rose Garden; 20,609	31–19
51	February 11	Oklahoma City	W 106–92	Brandon Roy (22)	Joel Przybilla (14)	Jerryd Bayless (8)	Rose Garden; 20,050	32–19
52	February 12	@ Golden State	L 98–105	Brandon Roy (37)	Travis Outlaw (12)	Sergio Rodríguez (7)	Oracle Arena; 19,322	32–20
53	February 18	Memphis	W 94–90	Brandon Roy (24)	Joel Przybilla (15)	Brandon Roy (9)	Rose Garden; 20,385	33–20
54	February 20	Atlanta	W 108–98	Brandon Roy (27)	LaMarcus Aldridge (11)	Steve Blake, Brandon Roy (5)	Rose Garden; 20,250	34–20
55	February 22	L.A. Clippers	W 116–87	LaMarcus Aldridge (28)	LaMarcus Aldridge (10)	Steve Blake (17)	Rose Garden; 20,447	35–20
56	February 24	@ Houston	L 94–98	Brandon Roy (24)	LaMarcus Aldridge, Joel Przybilla (8)	Brandon Roy, Steve Blake (5)	Toyota Center; 17,515	35–21
57	February 25	@ San Antonio	L 84–99	Channing Frye (15)	Joel Przybilla (10)	Sergio Rodríguez (7)	AT&T Center; 18,672	35–22
58	February 27	@ Minnesota	W 102–82	Brandon Roy (19)	LaMarcus Aldridge (10)	Steve Blake (6)	Target Center; 17,017	36–22

March: 11–5 (home: 8–2; road: 3–3)

Game	Date	Team	Score	High points	High rebounds	High assists	Location Attendance	Record
59	March 1	San Antonio	W 102–84	LaMarcus Aldridge, Brandon Roy (26)	Joel Przybilla (10)	Steve Blake (6)	Rose Garden; 20,627	37–22
60	March 4	Indiana	W 107–105	Brandon Roy (28)	Joel Przybilla (12)	Rudy Fernández (4)	Rose Garden; 20,020	38–22
61	March 5	@ Denver	L 90–106	Brandon Roy (22)	Joel Przybilla (12)	Steve Blake (5)	Pepsi Center; 16,801	38–23
62	March 7	Minnesota	W 95–93	Brandon Roy (31)	LaMarcus Aldridge (11)	Brandon Roy (6)	Rose Garden; 20,535	39–23
63	March 9	L.A. Lakers	W 111–94	Brandon Roy (27)	Joel Przybilla (18)	Sergio Rodríguez, Steve Blake (6)	Rose Garden; 20,573	40–23
64	March 11	Dallas	L 89–93	LaMarcus Aldridge (23)	Joel Przybilla (15)	Brandon Roy (6)	Rose Garden; 20,286	40–24
65	March 13	New Jersey	W 109–100	Brandon Roy (31)	LaMarcus Aldridge, Travis Outlaw (10)	Steve Blake (5)	Rose Garden; 20,634	41–24
66	March 15	@ Atlanta	L 80–98	Brandon Roy (29)	Joel Przybilla (14)	Brandon Roy (5)	Philips Arena; 14,413	41–25
67	March 16	@ Memphis	W 103–92	LaMarcus Aldridge (22)	Joel Przybilla (13)	Brandon Roy (9)	FedExForum; 11,417	42–25
68	March 18	@ Indiana	W 95–85	Brandon Roy (20)	Joel Przybilla (11)	Steve Blake (8)	Conseco Fieldhouse; 13,072	43–25
69	March 19	@ Cleveland	L 92–97 (OT)	Brandon Roy (24)	Joel Przybilla (11)	Brandon Roy, Steve Blake (7)	Quicken Loans Arena; 20,562	43–26
70	March 21	@ Milwaukee	W 96–84	Brandon Roy (30)	Joel Przybilla (14)	Brandon Roy (7)	Bradley Center; 17,809	44–26
71	March 23	Philadelphia	L 108–114 (OT)	LaMarcus Aldridge (24)	LaMarcus Aldridge (12)	LaMarcus Aldridge, Steve Blake (5)	Rose Garden; 20,620	44–27
72	March 26	Phoenix	W 129–109	LaMarcus Aldridge (29)	LaMarcus Aldridge (12)	Sergio Rodríguez (8)	Rose Garden; 20,620	45–27
73	March 28	Memphis	W 86–66	Brandon Roy (21)	Joel Przybilla (10)	Sergio Rodríguez, Brandon Roy, Steve Blake (4)	Rose Garden; 20,680	46–27
74	March 31	Utah	W 125–104	LaMarcus Aldridge (26)	Joel Przybilla (9)	Brandon Roy (11)	Rose Garden; 20,675	47–27

April: 7–1 (home: 3–0; road: 4–1)

Game	Date	Team	Score	High points	High rebounds	High assists	Location Attendance	Record
75	April 3	@ Oklahoma City	W 107–72	LaMarcus Aldridge (35)	LaMarcus Aldridge (18)	Steve Blake (10)	Ford Center; 19,136	48–27
76	April 5	@ Houston	L 88–102	LaMarcus Aldridge, Brandon Roy (22)	LaMarcus Aldridge (9)	Brandon Roy (6)	Toyota Center; 18,214	48–28
77	April 7	@ Memphis	W 96–93	Brandon Roy (24)	LaMarcus Aldridge (8)	Brandon Roy (4)	FedExForum; 10,089	49–28
78	April 8	@ San Antonio	W 95–83	Brandon Roy (26)	Joel Przybilla (17)	Steve Blake (7)	AT&T Center; 18,797	50–28
79	April 10	L.A. Lakers	W 106–98	Brandon Roy (24)	Joel Przybilla (13)	Brandon Roy (8)	Rose Garden; 20,681	51–28
80	April 11	@ L.A. Clippers	W 87–72	LaMarcus Aldridge (21)	Joel Przybilla (14)	Steve Blake (5)	Staples Center; 18,321	52–28
81	April 13	Oklahoma City	W 113–83	Travis Outlaw (21)	Joel Przybilla (12)	Sergio Rodríguez (8)	Rose Garden; 20,655	53–28
82	April 15	Denver	W 104–76	Travis Outlaw (21)	Joel Przybilla (8)	Sergio Rodríguez (12)	Rose Garden; 20,652	54–28

2008–09 season schedule

== Playoffs ==
2009 playoff game log
First round: 2–4 (home: 2–1; road: 0–3)

Game	Date	Team	Score	High points	High rebounds	High assists	Location Attendance	Record
1	April 18	Houston	L 81–108	Brandon Roy (21)	four players (5)	Steve Blake (6)	Rose Garden; 20,329	0–1
2	April 21	Houston	W 107–103	Brandon Roy (42)	LaMarcus Aldridge (12)	Steve Blake (5)	Rose Garden; 20,408	1–1
3	April 24	@ Houston	L 83–86	Brandon Roy (19)	LaMarcus Aldridge (8)	Steve Blake (10)	Toyota Center; 18,371	1–2
4	April 26	@ Houston	L 88–89	Brandon Roy (31)	Joel Przybilla (12)	Steve Blake (8)	Toyota Center; 18,271	1–3
5	April 28	Houston	W 88–77	Roy, Aldridge (25)	Aldridge, Blake (7)	Joel Przybilla (4)	Rose Garden; 20,462	2–3
6	April 30	@ Houston	L 76–92	LaMarcus Aldridge (25)	Fernández, Przybilla (8)	Steve Blake (5)	Toyota Center; 18,376	2–4

2009 playoff schedule

== Player statistics ==
Legend
GP	Games played	GS	Games started	MPG	Minutes per game
FG%	Field-goal percentage	3P%	3-point field-goal percentage	FT%	Free-throw percentage
RPG	Rebounds per game	APG	Assists per game	SPG	Steals per game
BPG	Blocks per game	PPG	Points per game	Source:

=== Season ===
Player	GP	GS	MPG	FG%	3FG%	FT%	RPG	APG	SPG	BPG	PPG
LaMarcus Aldridge	81	81	37.1	.484	.250	.781	7.5	1.9	.95	.95	18.1
Nicolas Batum	79	76	18.4	.446	.369	.808	2.8	.9	.63	.51	5.4
Jerryd Bayless	53	0	12.4	.365	.259	.806	1.1	1.5	.30	.04	4.3
Steve Blake	69	69	31.7	.428	.427	.840	2.5	5.0	1.0	.06	11.0
Rudy Fernández	78	4	25.6	.425	.399	.839	2.7	2.0	.88	.15	10.4
Channing Frye	63	1	11.8	.423	.333	.722	2.2	.4	.27	.25	4.2
Greg Oden	61	39	21.5	.564	.000	.637	7.0	.5	.41	1.13	8.9
Travis Outlaw	81	6	27.7	.453	.377	.723	4.1	1.0	.58	.70	12.8
Joel Przybilla	82	43	23.8	.625	.000	.663	8.7	.3	.41	1.18	5.5
Shavlik Randolph	10	0	3.7	.615	1.000	.250	1.8	0	0	.1	1.8
Sergio Rodríguez	80	13	15.3	.392	.325	.792	1.6	3.6	.68	.03	4.5
Brandon Roy	78	78	37.2	.480	.377	.824	4.7	5.1	1.13	.28	22.6
Michael Ruffin	11	0	3.2	.286	.000	1.000	1.0	0	.27	.09	.5
Martell Webster	1	0	5.0	.000	.000	.000	0	0	0	0	0

=== Playoffs ===
Player	GP	GS	MPG	FG%	3FG%	FT%	RPG	APG	SPG	BPG	PPG
LaMarcus Aldridge	6	6	39.5	.490	.250	.700	7.5	1.3	.5	1.67	19.5
Nicolas Batum	6	5	10.5	.556	.500	0	.5	.2	.7	.33	2.0
Jerryd Bayless	2	0	5.5	.333	.000	.667	.5	0	0	.5	3.0
Steve Blake	6	6	38.5	.489	.417	.714	4.0	6.2	.83	0	9.8
Rudy Fernández	6	1	27.0	.429	.421	1.000	2.8	1.0	1.33	.5	7.5
Channing Frye	4	0	9.0	.357	.000	.667	.8	.3	0	0	3.0
Greg Oden	6	0	16.0	.524	.000	.667	4.3	0	.33	1.0	5.0
Travis Outlaw	6	0	28.3	.318	.250	.667	3.0	.5	.83	.67	9.0
Joel Przybilla	6	6	27.0	.556	.000	.500	7.3	1.3	.67	2.0	3.8
Sergio Rodríguez	5	0	5.4	.333	.000	.000	.6	1.4	0	.2	.8
Brandon Roy	6	6	39.7	.459	.471	.870	4.8	2.8	1.33	1.17	26.7
Michael Ruffin	1	0	5.0	.000	.000	.500	5.0	0	0	0	1

== Awards and records ==
=== Awards ===
- Brandon Roy, All-NBA Second Team
- Rudy Fernandez, NBA All-Rookie Second Team

=== Records ===
- 12/18/08 – Brandon Roy scores 52 points (2nd most in team history) in 124–119 win over Phoenix.
- 2/22/09 – Steve Blake ties the NBA record and sets the team record of assists in a quarter with 14 against the Los Angeles Clippers.
- 4/15/09 – Rudy Fernández sets the rookie record for 3-point baskets made in a season with 159.

== Transactions ==
=== Trades ===
==== Additions ====
Player	Signed	Former team
Jerryd Bayless	July 9	Indiana Pacers
Ike Diogu	July 9	Indiana Pacers
Michael Ruffin	February 18	Chicago Bulls

==== Subtractions ====
Player	Left	New team
Jarrett Jack	July 9	Indiana Pacers
Josh McRoberts	July 9	Indiana Pacers
Brandon Rush	July 9	Indiana Pacers
Ike Diogu	February 18	Sacramento Kings

=== Free agents ===
==== Additions ====
Player	Signed	Former team
Shavlik Randolph	September 25	Philadelphia 76ers

==== Subtractions ====
Player	Left	New team
James Jones	July 8	Miami Heat
Darius Miles	August 22	Boston Celtics
