= Von Wafer =

American basketball player (born 1985)

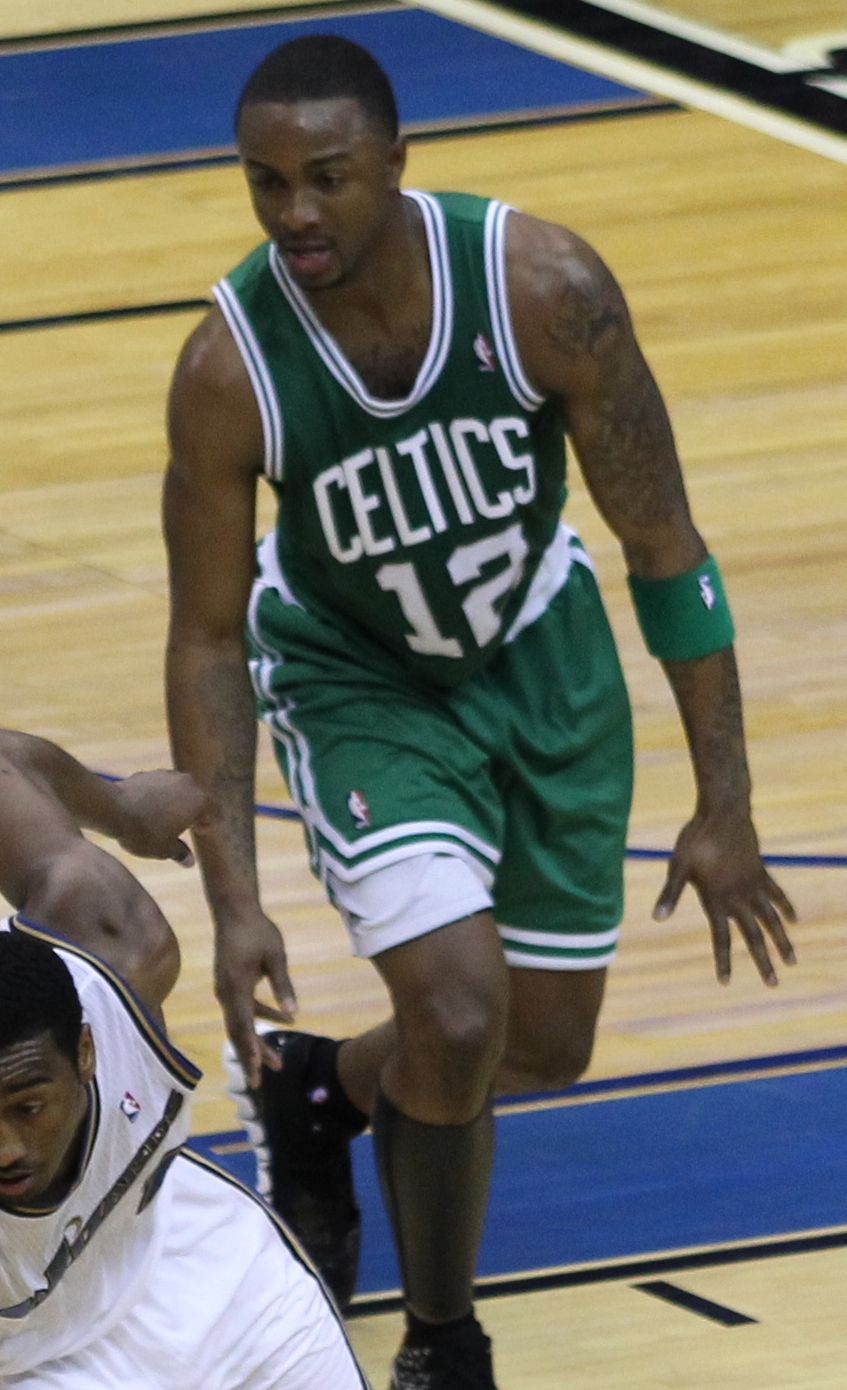
- Wafer with the Boston Celtics in 2011

Personal information
- Born: July 21, 1985 (age 41) Homer, Louisiana, U.S.
- Listed height: 6 ft 5 in (1.96 m)
- Listed weight: 220 lb (100 kg)

Career information
- High school: Pineview (Lisbon, Louisiana); Heritage Christian Academy (Cleveland, Texas)
- College: Florida State (2003–2005)
- NBA draft: 2005: 2nd round, 39th overall pick
- Drafted by: Los Angeles Lakers
- Playing career: 2005–2018
- Position: Shooting guard / small forward
- Number: 23, 22, 24, 13, 12, 1

Career history
- 2005–2006: Los Angeles Lakers
- 2006–2007: Colorado 14ers
- 2007: Los Angeles Clippers
- 2007–2008: Denver Nuggets
- 2008: Portland Trail Blazers
- 2008–2009: Houston Rockets
- 2009: Olympiacos Piraeus
- 2010–2011: Boston Celtics
- 2011: Vanoli-Braga Cremona
- 2011–2012: Orlando Magic
- 2012–2013: Xinjiang Flying Tigers
- 2013: Shanghai Sharks
- 2014: Bakersfield Jam
- 2014: Krasny Oktyabr
- 2014: Indios de Mayagüez
- 2014–2015: Shanxi Zhongyu
- 2015–2016: Jiangsu Monkey King
- 2016: Leones de Ponce
- 2016: Delaware 87ers
- 2016–2017: Westchester Knicks
- 2017: Shaanxi Wolves
- 2017–2018: Jilin Northeast Tigers
- 2018: Leones de Ponce

Career highlights
- All-NBA D-League First Team (2007); Second-team Parade All-American (2003); McDonald's All-American (2003)

Career NBA statistics
- Points: 1,054 (5.3 ppg)
- Rebounds: 234 (1.2 rpg)
- Assists: 146 (0.7 apg)
- Stats at NBA.com
- Stats at Basketball Reference

Vakeaton Quamar "Von" Wafer (born July 21, 1985) is an American former professional basketball player. He played college basketball for the Florida State Seminoles.

Wafer has previously played in the National Basketball Association (NBA) with the Los Angeles Lakers, Los Angeles Clippers, Denver Nuggets, Portland Trail Blazers, Houston Rockets, Boston Celtics and Orlando Magic. He was the 39th overall selection (ninth pick of the second round) in the 2005 NBA draft by the Lakers. His nickname is "The Dutch Cookie".

== High school ==
Wafer attended Pineview High School in Lisbon, Louisiana during his freshman, sophomore and junior years of high school. He averaged 32 points, 10 rebounds and 7 assists during his junior season. Up to that point, Wafer was a virtual unknown on the national recruiting scene. Tim Loring, the coach of the Arkansas Wings AAU team, invited Wafer to play for them the summer before his senior year. This allowed Wafer to display his skills on a wider stage, and by the end of the summer, he was considered to be one of the top ten seniors on many recruiting lists. He was also briefly at R.L. Paschal High School and Laurinburg Institute his senior year before deciding to attend and play at Heritage Christian Academy in Cleveland, Texas, where he averaged 26 points, 8 rebounds, 4 steals, and 4 blocks per game.

Wafer was the seventh McDonald's High School All-American to play at Florida State University. During the game, he scored 8 points and finished second to LeBron James in the McDonald's All-American slam-dunk contest.

== College ==
During his freshman year at Florida State University in the 2003–04 season, Wafer averaged 7.9 points in 17.5 minutes a game with the Seminoles. He ranked third among all ACC freshmen with 43 three-point field goals made and scored in double figures 12 times. As a sophomore during the 2004–05 season, he led the team in scoring (12.5 ppg) and three-point field goals made (65). He made more than one three-point field goal in 14 games and surpassed the 20-point mark on six occasions. Despite some success that year, he was suspended for two games early in the season and benched frequently later. The Tallahassee Democrat reported that his family explained the suspensions were because of missed classes and study sessions.

== Professional career ==
Wafer declared himself as an early-entry candidate for the 2005 NBA draft after his sophomore year at FSU despite many draft experts predicting he would not be drafted. There were several hurdles he had to overcome to become a viable option for an NBA team to select him. Wafer was not invited to the annual Chicago pre-draft camp, which provides players who are not viewed as first-round prospects a chance to display their abilities in front of NBA team personnel. During a workout with the Phoenix Suns, Wafer reportedly was frustrated by the physical play from Jan Jagla, and responded by laying an intentional elbow to Jagla's nose, then walked off the court and ended the workout at that point. Los Angeles Lakers scout Irving Thomas, who played two seasons at FSU, saw three Seminoles games during the 2004–05 season and helped arrange a workout for Wafer with the Lakers. Lakers general manager Mitch Kupchak saw enough of Wafer's ability that they used the second of their two second-round picks to select Wafer in the draft.

Wafer was placed on waivers by the Lakers on October 26, 2006. He played in only one pre-season game due to a bruised left heel. Wafer then played for the Colorado 14ers of the NBA Development League during 2006–07, and was named Player of the Month in January 2007. He was signed to a ten-day contract by the Los Angeles Clippers on February 21. He played one minute without scoring before being waived a week later. On April 12, 2007, the Denver Nuggets signed Wafer for the remainder of the 2006–07 season.

On February 21, 2008, the Denver Nuggets traded Wafer to the Portland Trail Blazers for Taurean Green. Wafer changed his number from 22 (which he wore with the Nuggets) to 24, as number 22 had been retired by the Trail Blazers to honor Clyde Drexler.

=== Houston Rockets ===
Wafer was signed by the Houston Rockets and managed to keep a spot on the team due to his hot shooting in the preseason. On January 13, 2009, Wafer scored a career-high 23 points on 10–14 shooting in 39 minutes against the Los Angeles Lakers. He found a regular place in the Rockets' starting lineup due to good performance as well as an injury to regular starter Tracy McGrady. He continued to impress by scoring 21 points versus the Jazz and hitting the game-winning three at a game in Boston that the Rockets won 89–85. In that month he averaged 14.3 points per game. After Wafer moved to a team in Greece, the Rockets offered him a contract midway through the next season. He signed the contract, but failed his physical, so he could not join the Rockets.

=== Olympiacos Piraeus ===
Wafer joined the Greek Euroleague club Olympiacos Piraeus in August 2009, signing a two-year $10 million gross income contract. He was then waived by Olympiacos in December 2009. Wafer shot 36.4% from the field and averaged 3.0 points per game and 1.3 rebounds per game in the Greek A1 League with Olympiacos. In Euroleague play, he shot 50% from the field and averaged 7.7 points per game, 1.3 rebounds per game, and 1.0 assists per game.

=== Dallas Mavericks ===
On February 24, 2010, Wafer signed a ten-day contract with the Dallas Mavericks. He was not expected to crack the rotation during his tenure and although he was eligible to play six games, Wafer finished his contract with Dallas without playing a single minute.

=== Boston Celtics ===
On July 3, 2010, Wafer signed a free agent deal with the Boston Celtics. On October 29, 2010, he was involved in a locker-room altercation with new teammate Delonte West.

=== Vanoli-Braga Cremona ===
In August 2011, during the 2011 NBA lockout, he signed a one-year contract with Vanoli-Braga Cremona in Italy.

=== Orlando Magic ===
Wafer was traded to the Magic on December 12, 2011, along with Glen Davis for Brandon Bass. He was waived by the Magic at the end of the 2011–12 season.

=== Move to CBA ===
Wafer moved to China in 2012, signed a one-year contract with Xinjiang Flying Tigers worth $2 million. He played 34 games for Xinjiang, averaged 26.4 points with a shooting percentage of 55.4%. He also got 4.4 rebounds, 3.4 assists and 1.1 steals per game.

In October 2013, he signed with the Shanghai Sharks, the team owned by his former teammate Yao Ming at the Rockets. In December 2013, he left the Sharks.

=== Bakersfield Jam ===
On January 10, 2014, he was acquired by the Bakersfield Jam of the NBA Development League. On January 28, 2014, he was waived by the Jam.

=== Russia ===
On February 3, 2014, he signed with BC Krasny Oktyabr for the rest of the 2013–2014 season.

=== Delaware 87ers ===
On November 26, 2016, Wafer returned to the United States, signing with the Delaware 87ers of the NBA Development League.

=== Westchester Knicks ===
On December 14, 2016, Wafer was traded to the Westchester Knicks in exchange for Devondrick Walker.

=== Return to CBA ===
On August 27, 2017, Wafer returned to China, signing with the Jilin Northeast Tigers.

== NBA career statistics ==
Legend
GP	Games played	GS	Games started	MPG	Minutes per game
FG%	Field goal percentage	3P%	3-point field goal percentage	FT%	Free throw percentage
RPG	Rebounds per game	APG	Assists per game	SPG	Steals per game
BPG	Blocks per game	PPG	Points per game	**Bold**	Career high

=== Regular season ===
Year	Team	GP	GS	MPG	FG%	3P%	FT%	RPG	APG	SPG	BPG	PPG
2005–06	L.A. Lakers	16	0	4.6	.158	.118	.750	.5	.3	.2	.0	1.3
2006–07	L.A. Clippers	1	0	1.0	.000	.000	.000	.0	.0	.0	.0	.0
2007–08	Denver	21	0	4.3	.263	.067	.750	.5	.2	.1	.0	1.3
2007–08	Portland	8	0	8.0	.304	.273	.500	1.1	.3	.0	**.3**	2.4
2008–09	Houston	**63**	**11**	**19.4**	.447	**.390**	.752	**1.8**	**1.1**	**.6**	.1	**9.7**
2010–11	Boston	58	2	9.5	.421	.269	**.842**	.8	.6	.3	.1	3.2
2011–12	Orlando	33	1	14.2	**.452**	.359	.704	1.4	.9	.3	.1	5.9
Career		200	14	12.4	.420	.325	.751	1.2	.7	.4	.1	5.3

=== Playoffs ===
Year	Team	GP	GS	MPG	FG%	3P%	FT%	RPG	APG	SPG	BPG	PPG
2009	Houston	**13**	0	**13.9**	.424	**.409**	**.864**	.9	**.7**	**.2**	**.1**	**8.2**
2011	Boston	3	0	1.7	.000	.000	.000	.3	.0	.0	.0	.0
2012	Orlando	1	0	6.0	**.600**	.000	.000	**1.0**	.0	.0	.0	6.0
Career		17	0	11.2	.424	.391	.864	.8	.5	.1	.1	6.6
