= Joel Przybilla =

American basketball player (born 1979)

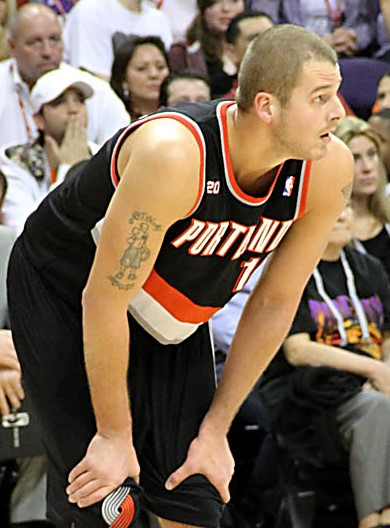
- Przybilla with the Portland Trail Blazers in 2011

Personal information
- Born: October 10, 1979 (age 47) Monticello, Minnesota, U.S.
- Listed height: 7 ft 1 in (2.16 m)
- Listed weight: 245 lb (111 kg)

Career information
- High school: Monticello (Monticello, Minnesota)
- College: Minnesota (1998–2000)
- NBA draft: 2000: 1st round, 9th overall pick
- Drafted by: Houston Rockets
- Playing career: 2000–2013
- Position: Center
- Number: 6, 10

Career history
- 2000–2004: Milwaukee Bucks
- 2004: Atlanta Hawks
- 2004–2011: Portland Trail Blazers
- 2011: Charlotte Bobcats
- 2012: Portland Trail Blazers
- 2012–2013: Milwaukee Bucks

Career highlights
- First-team Parade All-American (1998); Co-Minnesota Mr. Basketball (1998); McDonald's All-American (1998)

Career statistics
- Points: 2,293 (3.9 ppg)
- Rebounds: 3,665 (6.2 rpg)
- Blocks: 836 (1.4 bpg)
- Stats at NBA.com
- Stats at Basketball Reference

Joel Przybilla (/prɪzˈbɪlə/; born October 10, 1979) is an American former professional basketball player who played the center position for 13 seasons in the National Basketball Association (NBA).

== High school career ==
Przybilla was born in Monticello, Minnesota, and attended Monticello High School, where he was coached by Max LaVelle of the Monticello Magic. He was named 1998 Minnesota Mr. Basketball, along with Darius Lane. He was also named to USA Today's All-USA second team and earned Parade All-American honors, and was a two-time Associated Press Minnesota Player of the Year honoree.

== College career ==
Przybilla spent two years at the University of Minnesota and left as second on the Golden Gophers' all-time single-season list with 84 blocks. He finished his sophomore season first in the Big Ten in field goal percentage, second in blocks and third in rebounding.

=== College statistics ===
Year	Team	GP	GS	MPG	FG%	3P%	FT%	RPG	APG	SPG	BPG	PPG
1998–99	Minnesota	28		25.5	.560	.000	.577	5.8	1.5	.0	.0	6.7
1999–2000	Minnesota	21		30.4	.613	.000	.495	8.4	2.4	.8	3.9	14.2

== NBA career ==
Przybilla was selected with the 9th overall pick in the 2000 NBA draft by the Houston Rockets, but was later traded to the Milwaukee Bucks for their first-round pick, Jason Collier, and a future first-round pick on draft night. After playing for the Bucks for over three seasons, on February 15, 2004, he was traded to the Atlanta Hawks in a three-team trade.

On August 25, 2004, Przybilla signed a two-year, $3.1 million deal with the Portland Trail Blazers. He made an immediate impact averaging 7.7 rebounds and 2.1 blocks per game in the 2004–05 NBA season. On July 17, 2006, he re-signed with the Trail Blazers to a reported five-year, $32 million contract. Bill Duffy, Przybilla's agent, explained his reasons for re-signing with the Blazers this way: "He's extremely loyal, and they gave him an opportunity two years ago when no one else did."

On March 22, 2008, Przybilla recorded a career-high 25 rebounds, two shy of the franchise record overall and one shy of the franchise record in a regulation game. On January 2, 2009, he was fined $7,500 and assessed a flagrant foul for striking Tyson Chandler.

In a game against the Dallas Mavericks on December 22, 2009, he suffered a ruptured patella tendon as well as a dislocated patella after landing awkwardly on his right knee. Two days later, he had surgery to repair the tear in the tendon and missed the rest of the 2009–10 season.

On February 24, 2011, Przybilla was traded, along with Dante Cunningham, Sean Marks and two future first-round draft picks, to the Charlotte Bobcats in exchange for Gerald Wallace.

On February 27, 2012, Przybilla re-signed with the Portland Trail Blazers.

On August 9, 2012, Przybilla signed with the Milwaukee Bucks, with whom he began his NBA career. His final NBA game was played on February 11, 2013, in a 90 - 102 loss to the Washington Wizards where he recorded only 3 rebounds in under 5 minutes of playing time.

On August 25, 2014, Przybilla officially retired from the NBA after sitting out the entire 2013–14 season.

== NBA career statistics ==
Legend
GP	Games played	GS	Games started	MPG	Minutes per game
FG%	Field goal percentage	3P%	3-point field goal percentage	FT%	Free throw percentage
RPG	Rebounds per game	APG	Assists per game	SPG	Steals per game
BPG	Blocks per game	PPG	Points per game	**Bold**	Career high
*	Led the league

=== Regular season ===
Year	Team	GP	GS	MPG	FG%	3P%	FT%	RPG	APG	SPG	BPG	PPG
2000–01	Milwaukee	33	13	8.2	.343	–	.273	2.2	.1	.1	.9	.8
2001–02	Milwaukee	71	62	15.9	.535	.000	.422	4.0	.3	.3	1.7	2.7
2002–03	Milwaukee	32	17	17.1	.391	–	.500	4.5	.4	.3	1.4	1.5
2003–04	Milwaukee	5	0	6.6	.000	–	.500	2.0	.6	.0	.0	.2
2003–04	Atlanta	12	12	**26.2**	.360	–	.414	8.4	.3	.4	1.4	4.0
2004–05	Portland	76	50	24.4	.598	–	.517	7.7	**1.0**	.3	2.1	**6.4**
2005–06	Portland	56	52	24.9	.548	–	.532	7.0	.8	**.4**	**2.3**	6.1
2006–07	Portland	43	43	16.3	.474	–	.370	3.9	.3	.2	1.6	2.0
2007–08	Portland	77	**67**	23.6	.576	.000	**.680**	8.4	.4	.2	1.2	4.8
2008–09	Portland	**82***	43	23.8	**.625**	.000	.663	**8.7**	.3	**.4**	1.2	5.5
2009–10	Portland	30	9	22.7	.523	–	.647	7.9	.3	.3	1.4	4.1
2010–11	Portland	31	9	14.4	.618	–	.565	3.9	.4	.2	.5	1.8
2010–11	Charlotte	5	0	14.8	.400	–	.250	4.8	.0	.0	.2	1.8
2011–12	Portland	27	19	16.6	.458	–	.611	5.1	.2	.2	.6	2.0
2012–13	Milwaukee	12	1	5.7	.250	–	.000	1.8	.3	.1	.2	.2
Career		592	397	19.8	.552	.000	.557	6.2	.4	.3	1.4	3.9

=== Playoffs ===
Year	Team	GP	GS	MPG	FG%	3P%	FT%	RPG	APG	SPG	BPG	PPG
2001	Milwaukee	1	0	2.0	.000	–	–	.0	.0	.0	.0	.0
2003	Milwaukee	4	3	8.3	**1.000**	–	–	2.5	.3	.0	.5	.5
2009	Portland	**6**	**6**	**27.0**	.556	–	**.500**	**7.3**	**1.3**	**.7**	**2.0**	**3.8**
Career		11	9	17.9	.579	–	.500	4.9	.8	.4	1.3	2.3

== Personal life ==
Przybilla was born the third of four children of Doug, an American Express employee, and Linda Przybilla, a middle school teacher's assistant. He is of German (maternally) and Polish descent. He and his wife, Noelle, have two sons, Anthony and Jayden.
