= 2007–08 Portland Trail Blazers season =

NBA professional basketball team season

- Head coach: Nate McMillan
- General manager: Kevin Pritchard; Tom Penn (assistant)
- Owner: Paul Allen
- Arena: Rose Garden

Results
- Record: 41–41 (.500)
- Place: Division: 3rd (Northwest); Conference: 10th (Western)
- Playoff finish: Did not qualify
- Stats at Basketball Reference

Local media
- Television: KGW; CSN Northwest
- Radio: KXL

The 2007–08 Portland Trail Blazers season was their 38th season in the NBA. The season saw the team draft Greg Oden with the first overall pick in the 2007 NBA draft, but he would miss his entire rookie campaign due to a knee injury that required microfracture surgery. The team would miss the season's playoffs.

== Offseason ==
The Trail Blazers were busy on draft day, making three trades. The first trade was with the Philadelphia 76ers. The Blazers traded second-round pick Derrick Byars and cash to the Sixers in exchange for Finnish point guard Petteri Koponen. The next trade was with the New York Knicks. The Blazers traded Dan Dickau, Fred Jones, and Zach Randolph to the Knicks for Steve Francis and Channing Frye. The last trade was also with the Knicks. The Blazers traded Demetris Nichols to the Knicks for a 2008 second-round pick (Ömer Aşık was later selected).

On July 11, the Blazers waived Steve Francis. They also traded cash to the Phoenix Suns for Rudy Fernández and James Jones. Fernández would not be on the team's roster during the season, but would join the team the following season. He would be selected to the NBA All-Rookie Second Team and would set the record for most three-point field goals made by a rookie (159). This season would be Jones's only season with the Blazers.

On July 13, the Blazers signed Steve Blake. This marked Blake's return to the Trail Blazers (he played for them during the 2006 season). This tenure would also be his longest with the Blazers, spanning from 2007 to 2010.

== Draft picks ==
Portland's selections from the 2007 NBA draft in New York City.

Round	Pick	Player	Position	Nationality	College / Club Team
1	1	Greg Oden	Center	United States	Ohio State
2	37	Josh McRoberts	Power Forward	United States	Duke
2	42	Derrick Byars	Small forward	United States	Vanderbilt
2	52	Taurean Green	Point guard	United States	Florida
2	53	Demetris Nichols	Small forward	United States	Syracuse

== Roster ==
2007–08 Portland Trail Blazers roster
Players

Pos.	No.	Player	Height	Weight	DOB	From
F	12	LaMarcus Aldridge	6 ft 11 in (2.11 m)	245 lb (111 kg)		Texas
PG	2	Steve Blake	6 ft 3 in (1.91 m)	172 lb (78 kg)		Maryland
F	44	Channing Frye	7 ft 0 in (2.13 m)	248 lb (112 kg)		Arizona
G	1	Jarrett Jack	6 ft 3 in (1.91 m)	197 lb (89 kg)		Georgia Tech
G/F	33	James Jones	6 ft 8 in (2.03 m)	220 lb (100 kg)		Miami (FL)
C	9	Raef LaFrentz	6 ft 11 in (2.11 m)	245 lb (111 kg)		Kansas
PF	4	Josh McRoberts	6 ft 10 in (2.08 m)	240 lb (109 kg)		Duke
F	23	Darius Miles	6 ft 9 in (2.06 m)	235 lb (107 kg)		East St. Louis HS (IL)
C	52	Greg Oden	7 ft 0 in (2.13 m)	250 lb (113 kg)		Ohio State
F	25	Travis Outlaw	6 ft 9 in (2.06 m)	215 lb (98 kg)		Starkville HS (MS)
C	10	Joel Przybilla	7 ft 1 in (2.16 m)	255 lb (116 kg)		Minnesota
PG	11	Sergio Rodríguez	6 ft 3 in (1.91 m)	168 lb (76 kg)		Spain
G	7	Brandon Roy	6 ft 6 in (1.98 m)	229 lb (104 kg)		Washington
SG	24	Von Wafer	6 ft 5 in (1.96 m)	210 lb (95 kg)		Florida State
G/F	8	Martell Webster	6 ft 7 in (2.01 m)	229 lb (104 kg)		Seattle Prep HS (WA)

Coaches
Head coach
- Nate McMillan (NC State)
Assistant(s)
- Dean Demopoulos (West Chester)
- Maurice Lucas (Marquette)
- Monty Williams (Notre Dame)

Legend
- (DP) Unsigned draft pick
- (FA) Free agent
- (S) Suspended
- Injured

Roster
Updated: 2008-02-21

=== Roster Notes ===
- Center Greg Oden missed the entire season due to a knee injury
- Forward Darius Miles missed the entire season due to microfracture knee surgery

== Regular season ==
=== Standings ===
Northwest Division	W	L	PCT	GB	Home	Road	Div
y-Utah Jazz	54	28	.659	–	37–4	17–24	13–3
x-Denver Nuggets	50	32	.610	4	33–8	17–24	10–6
Portland Trail Blazers	41	41	.500	13	28–13	13–28	10–6
Minnesota Timberwolves	22	60	.268	32	15–26	7–34	3–13
Seattle SuperSonics	20	62	.244	34	13–28	7–34	6–10

#	Western Conference				
#	Team	W	L	PCT	GB
1	c-Los Angeles Lakers	57	25	.695	–
2	y-New Orleans Hornets	56	26	.683	1
3	x-San Antonio Spurs	56	26	.683	1
4	y-Utah Jazz	54	28	.659	3
5	x-Houston Rockets	55	27	.671	2
6	x-Phoenix Suns	55	27	.671	2
7	x-Dallas Mavericks	51	31	.622	6
8	x-Denver Nuggets	50	32	.610	7
9	Golden State Warriors	48	34	.585	9
10	Portland Trail Blazers	41	41	.500	16
11	Sacramento Kings	38	44	.463	19
12	Los Angeles Clippers	23	59	.280	34
13	Minnesota Timberwolves	22	60	.268	35
14	Memphis Grizzlies	22	60	.268	35
15	Seattle SuperSonics	20	62	.244	37

z – clinched division title
y – clinched division title
x – clinched playoff spot

=== Game log ===
==== October ====
Record: 0–1; Home: 0–0; Road: 0–1

#	Date	Visitor	Score	Home	Leading scorer	Attendance	Record	Streak
1	October 30	Portland Trail Blazers	L 97–106	San Antonio Spurs	Aldridge: 27	AT&T Center; 18,797	0–1	L1

==== November ====
Record: 5–10; Home: 5–3; Road: 0–7

#	Date	Visitor	Score	Home	Leading scorer	Attendance	Record	Streak
2	November 2	Portland Trail Blazers	L 93–113	New Orleans Hornets	Roy: 23	New Orleans Arena; 9,817	0–2	L2
3	November 3	Portland Trail Blazers	L 80–89	Houston Rockets	Roy: 23	Toyota Center; 18,232	0–3	L3
4	November 7	New Orleans	W 90–93	Portland Trail Blazers	West: 34	Rose Garden; 19,980	1–3	W1
5	November 9	Memphis Grizzlies	W 98–110	Portland Trail Blazers	Gay: 31	Rose Garden; 18,112	2–3	W2
6	November 10	Dallas Mavericks	W 82–91	Portland Trail Blazers	Roy: 32	Rose Garden; 19,255	3–3	W3
7	November 13	Detroit Pistons	W 94–102	Portland Trail Blazers	Aldridge: 22	Rose Garden; 19,980	4–3	W4
8	November 14	Portland Trail Blazers	L 93–110	Denver Nuggets	Anthony: 25	Pepsi Center; 13,289	4–4	L1
9	November 16	Portland Trail Blazers	L 88–92	Philadelphia 76ers	Roy: 25; Aldridge: 25	Wachovia Center; 11,483	4–5	L2
10	November 17	Portland Trail Blazers	L 90–109	Washington Wizards	Jamison: 30	Verizon Center; 20,173	4–6	L3
11	November 19	Portland Trail Blazers	L 92–101	Charlotte Bobcats	Wallace: 27	Charlotte Bobcats Arena; 10,612	4–7	L4
12	November 21	New Jersey Nets	L 106–101	Portland Trail Blazers	Jefferson: 30	Rose Garden; 18,423	4–8	L5
13	November 23	Sacramento Kings	W 84–87	Portland Trail Blazers	Aldridge: 28	Rose Garden; 19,980	5–8	W1
14	November 26	Orlando Magic	L 85–74	Portland Trail Blazers	Türkoğlu: 21	Rose Garden; 15,922	5–9	L1
15	November 28	Indiana Pacers	L 95–89	Portland Trail Blazers	Outlaw: 26	Rose Garden; 16,168	5–10	L2
16	November 30	Portland Trail Blazers	L 80–91	Dallas Mavericks	Howard: 23	American Airlines Center; 20,301	5–11	L3

==== December ====
Record: 13–2; Home: 10–0; Road: 3–2

#	Date	Visitor	Score	Home	Leading scorer	Attendance	Record	Streak
17	December 2	Portland Trail Blazers	L 79–100	San Antonio Spurs	Parker: 27	AT&T Center; 18,797	5–12	L4
18	December 3	Portland Trail Blazers	W 106–105	Memphis Grizzlies	Gay: 30; Gasol: 30	FedExForum; 11,317	6–12	W1
19	December 6	Miami Heat	W 106–112	Portland Trail Blazers	Roy: 25	Rose Garden; 19,980	7–12	W2
20	December 9	Milwaukee Bucks	W 113–117; OT	Portland Trail Blazers	Williams: 30	Rose Garden; 18,317	8–12	W3
21	December 11	Portland Trail Blazers	W 97–89	Utah Jazz	Boozer: 29	EnergySolutions Arena; 19,911	9–12	W4
22	December 12	Golden State Warriors	W 95–105	Portland Trail Blazers	Davis: 23	Rose Garden; 15,943	10–12	W5
23	December 14	Utah Jazz	W 91–99	Portland Trail Blazers	Roy: 29	Rose Garden; 19,980	11–12	W6
24	December 16	Portland Trail Blazers	W 116–105	Denver Nuggets	Iverson: 38	Pepsi Center; 13,678	12–12	W7
25	December 17	New Orleans Hornets	W 76–88	Portland Trail Blazers	Roy: 24	Rose Garden; 15,183	13–12	W8
26	December 19	Toronto Raptors	W 96–101	Portland Trail Blazers	Roy: 25	Rose Garden; 16,066	14–12	W9
27	December 21	Denver Nuggets	W 96–99	Portland Trail Blazers	Anthony: 34; Iverson: 34	Rose Garden; 20,644	15–12	W10
28	December 25	Seattle SuperSonics	W 79–89	Portland Trail Blazers	Durant: 23	Rose Garden; 20,527	16–12	W11
29	December 28	Minnesota Timberwolves	W 98–109	Portland Trail Blazers	Roy: 22; Jefferson: 22	Rose Garden; 20,491	17–12	W12
30	December 30	Philadelphia 76ers	W 72–97	Portland Trail Blazers	Iguodala: 24	Rose Garden; 20,464	18–12	W13
31	December 31	Portland Trail Blazers	L 101–111	Utah Jazz	Aldridge: 36	EnergySolutions Arena; 19,911	18–13	L1

==== January ====
Record: 8–6; Home: 3–2; Road: 5–4

#	Date	Visitor	Score	Home	Leading scorer	Attendance	Record	Streak
32	January 2	Portland Trail Blazers	W 90–79	Minnesota Timberwolves	Jefferson: 29	Target Center; 13,339	19–13	W1
33	January 3	Portland Trail Blazers	W 115–109; 2 OT	Chicago Bulls	Gordon: 32	United Center; 21,756	20–13	W2
34	January 5	Utah Jazz	W 89–103	Portland Trail Blazers	Webster: 26	Rose Garden; 20,451	21–13	W3
35	January 9	Golden State Warriors	W 91–109	Portland Trail Blazers	Blake: 24	Rose Garden; 20,415	22–13	W4
36	January 13	Portland Trail Blazers	L 109–116; 2 OT	Toronto Raptors	Bosh: 38	Air Canada Centre; 19,800	22–14	L1
37	January 14	Portland Trail Blazers	W 99–73	New Jersey Nets	Aldridge: 20	Izod Center; 14,242	23–14	W1
38	January 16	Portland Trail Blazers	L 90–100	Boston Celtics	Garnett: 36	TD Banknorth Garden; 18,624	23–15	L1
39	January 18	Portland Trail Blazers	W 98–91	Miami Heat	Wade: 37	AmericanAirlines Arena; 19,600	24–15	W1
40	January 19	Portland Trail Blazers	L 94–101	Orlando Magic	Roy: 25	Amway Arena; 17,519	24–16	L1
41	January 21	Portland Trail Blazers	W 111–109; OT	Atlanta Hawks	Johnson: 37	Philips Arena; 17,400	25–16	W1
42	January 23	Portland Trail Blazers	L 81–96	New Orleans Hornets	Pargo: 24	New Orleans Arena; 11,006	25–17	L1
43	January 25	Houston Rockets	L 89–79	Portland Trail Blazers	Roy: 23	Rose Garden; 20,576	25–18	L2
44	January 27	Atlanta Hawks	W 93–94	Portland Trail Blazers	Roy: 24	Rose Garden; 20,438	26–18	W1
45	January 30	Cleveland Cavaliers	L 84–83	Portland Trail Blazers	James: 37	Rose Garden; 20,501	26–19	L1

==== February ====
Record: 5–9; Home: 4–3; Road: 1–6

#	Date	Visitor	Score	Home	Leading scorer	Attendance	Record	Streak
46	February 1	New York Knicks	W 94–88; OT	Portland Trail Blazers	Randolph: 25	Rose Garden; 20,422	27–19	W1
47	February 4	Denver Nuggets	L 105–103; OT	Portland Trail Blazers	Anthony: 28	Rose Garden; 20,320	27–20	L1
48	February 6	Chicago Bulls	W 97–100	Portland Trail Blazers	Roy: 28	Rose Garden; 20,126	28–20	W1
49	February 8	Portland Trail Blazers	L 82–91	Detroit Pistons	Aldridge: 22	The Palace of Auburn Hills; 22,076	28–21	L1
50	February 9	Portland Trail Blazers	L 93–101	Indiana Pacers	Granger: 29	Conseco Fieldhouse; 14,130	28–22	L2
51	February 11	Portland Trail Blazers	L 83–95	Houston Rockets	Yao: 25	Toyota Center; 14,710	28–23	L3
52	February 13	Portland Trail Blazers	L 76–96	Dallas Mavericks	Nowitzki: 37	American Airlines Center; 20,159	28–24	L4
53	February 19	Sacramento Kings	L 105–94	Portland Trail Blazers	Artest: 24	Rose Garden; 19,980	28–25	L5
54	February 21	Seattle SuperSonics	W 88–92	Portland Trail Blazers	Durant: 20	Rose Garden; 20,168	29–25	W1
55	February 22	Portland Trail Blazers	L 87–99	Seattle SuperSonics	Outlaw: 26	KeyArena; 16,640	29–26	L1
56	February 24	Boston Celtics	L 112–102	Portland Trail Blazers	Pierce: 30	Rose Garden; 20,554	29–27	L2
57	February 26	Portland Trail Blazers	L 83–96	Los Angeles Lakers	Bryant: 30	Staples Center; 18,997	29–28	L3
58	February 27	Portland Trail Blazers	W 82–80	Los Angeles Clippers	Maggette: 32	Staples Center; 16,494	30–28	W1
59	February 29	Los Angeles Lakers	W 111–119	Portland Trail Blazers	Bryant: 33	Rose Garden; 20,651	31–28	W2

==== March ====
Record: 7–8; Home: 3–3; Road: 4–5

#	Date	Visitor	Score	Home	Leading scorer	Attendance	Record	Streak
60	March 2	Portland Trail Blazers	L 104–110	Golden State Warriors	Jackson: 29	Oracle Arena; 19,596	31–29	L1
61	March 4	Phoenix Suns	L 97–92	Portland Trail Blazers	Roy: 25	Rose Garden; 20,595	31–30	L2
62	March 7	Portland Trail Blazers	W 103–101	Milwaukee Bucks	Aldridge: 29	Bradley Center; 15,537	32–30	W1
63	March 8	Portland Trail Blazers	W 120–114; OT	New York Knicks	Robinson: 45	Madison Square Garden; 19,763	33–30	W2
64	March 10	Portland Trail Blazers	L 80–88	Cleveland Cavaliers	Aldridge: 25	Quicken Loans Arena; 20,213	33–31	L1
65	March 11	Portland Trail Blazers	W 103–96	Minnesota Timberwolves	Roy: 27	Target Center; 13,433	34–31	W1
66	March 13	Portland Trail Blazers	L 85–96	Sacramento Kings	Artest: 22	ARCO Arena; 13,333	34–32	L1
67	March 15	Minnesota Timberwolves	W 96–107	Portland Trail Blazers	Aldridge: 26	Rose Garden; 20,079	35–32	W1
68	March 18	Phoenix Suns	L 111–98	Portland Trail Blazers	Aldridge: 31	Rose Garden; 20,580	35–33	L1
69	March 21	Los Angeles Clippers	W 102–107	Portland Trail Blazers	Mobley: 24	Rose Garden; 19,980	36–33	W1
70	March 22	Portland Trail Blazers	W 83–72	Los Angeles Clippers	Roy: 23	Staples Center; 18,248	37–33	W2
71	March 24	Portland Trail Blazers	L 84–97	Seattle SuperSonics	Durant: 23	KeyArena; 11,292	37–34	L1
72	March 25	Washington Wizards	W 82–102	Portland Trail Blazers	Webster: 23	Rose Garden; 19,980	38–34	W1
73	March 27	Portland Trail Blazers	L 95–111	Golden State Warriors	Jackson: 24	Oracle Arena; 19,732	38–35	L1
74	March 29	Charlotte Bobcats	L 93–85	Portland Trail Blazers	Outlaw: 26	Rose Garden; 19,980	38–36	L2

==== April ====
Record: 3–5; Home: 3–2; Road: 0–3

#	Date	Visitor	Score	Home	Leading scorer	Attendance	Record	Streak
75	April 2	Portland Trail Blazers	L 91–104	Los Angeles Lakers	Bryant: 36	Staples Center; 18,997	38–37	L3
76	April 3	Houston Rockets	L 95–86	Portland Trail Blazers	McGrady: 35	Rose Garden; 19,980	38–38	L4
77	April 6	San Antonio Spurs	L 72–65	Portland Trail Blazers	Duncan: 27	Rose Garden; 19,980	38–39	L5
78	April 8	Los Angeles Lakers	W 103–112	Portland Trail Blazers	Bryant: 34	Rose Garden; 20,435	39–39	W1
79	April 11	Portland Trail Blazers	L 86–103	Sacramento Kings	Aldridge: 24	ARCO Arena; 13,327	39–40	L1
80	April 12	Dallas Mavericks	W 105–108	Portland Trail Blazers	Nowitzki: 28	Rose Garden; 19,980	40–40	W1
81	April 15	Memphis Grizzlies	W 91–113	Portland Trail Blazers	Jones: 20	Rose Garden; 19,980	41–40	W2
82	April 16	Portland Trail Blazers	L 91–100	Phoenix Suns	Outlaw: 24	US Airways Center; 18,422	41–41	L1

- Green background indicates win.
- Red background indicates regulation loss.

Player	GP	GS	MPG	FG%	3FG%	FT%	RPG	APG	SPG	BPG	PPG
LaMarcus Aldridge	76	76	34.9	.484	.143	.762	7.6	1.6	.72	1.24	17.8
Steve Blake	81	78	29.9	.408	.406	.766	2.4	5.1	.68	.05	8.5
Channing Frye	78	20	17.2	.488	.300	.780	4.5	.7	.37	.35	6.8
Jarrett Jack	82	16	27.2	.431	.342	.867	2.9	3.8	.74	.01	9.9
James Jones	58	3	22.0	.437	.444	.878	2.8	.6	.41	.26	8.0
Raef LaFrentz	39	0	7.5	.443	.000	.579	1.7	.2	.31	.44	1.7
Josh McRoberts	8	0	3.5	.600	.000	.000	1.3	.3	.13	.00	1.5
Travis Outlaw	82	6	26.7	.433	.396	.741	4.6	1.3	.72	.77	13.3
Joel Przybilla	77	67	23.6	.576	.000	.680	8.4	.4	.17	1.21	4.8
Sergio Rodríguez	72	0	8.7	.352	.293	.658	.8	1.7	.33	.00	2.5
Brandon Roy	74	74	37.7	.454	.340	.753	4.7	5.8	1.07	.22	19.1
Von Wafer*	29	0	5.3	.279	.154	.667	.7	.2	.07	.10	1.6
Martell Webster	75	70	28.4	.422	.388	.735	3.9	1.2	.56	.37	10.7

*Total for entire season including previous team(s)

== Awards and records ==
=== Records ===
The Trail Blazers had the longest winning streak at 13 as of January 30, 2008.

== Player statistics ==
Legend
GP	Games played	GS	Games started	MPG	Minutes per game
FG%	Field-goal percentage	3P%	3-point field-goal percentage	FT%	Free-throw percentage
RPG	Rebounds per game	APG	Assists per game	SPG	Steals per game
BPG	Blocks per game	PPG	Points per game

=== Regular season ===
Portland Trail Blazers statistics
Player	GP	GS	MPG	FG%	3P%	FT%	RPG	APG	SPG	BPG	PPG
Jarrett Jack	82	16	27.2	.431	.342	.867	2.9	3.8	.7	.0	9.9
Travis Outlaw	82	6	26.7	.433	.396	.741	4.6	1.3	.7	.8	13.3
Steve Blake	81	78	29.9	.408	.406	.766	2.4	5.1	.7	.0	8.5
Channing Frye	78	20	17.2	.488	.300	.780	4.5	.7	.4	.3	6.8
Joel Przybilla	77	67	23.6	.576	.000	.680	8.4	.4	.2	1.2	4.8
LaMarcus Aldridge	76	76	34.9	.484	.143	.762	7.6	1.6	.7	1.2	17.8
Martell Webster	75	70	28.4	.422	.388	.735	3.9	1.2	.6	.4	10.7
Brandon Roy	74	74	37.7	.454	.340	.753	4.7	5.8	1.1	.2	19.1
Sergio Rodríguez	72	0	8.7	.352	.293	.658	.8	1.7	.3	.0	2.5
James Jones	58	3	22.0	.437	.444	.878	2.8	.6	.4	.3	8.0
Raef LaFrentz	39	0	7.5	.443	.000	.579	1.7	.2	.3	.4	1.7
Von Wafer^{†}	8	0	8.0	.304	.273	.500	1.1	.3	.0	.3	2.4
Taurean Green^{†}	8	0	5.5	.250	.125	1.000	.5	1.0	.1	.0	2.1
Josh McRoberts	8	0	3.5	.600	.000		1.3	.3	.1	.0	1.5

- ^{†} Denotes player spent time with another team in the season. Stats reflect time with the Trail Blazers only.

== Transactions ==
The Trail Blazers were involved in the following transactions during the 2007–08 season.

=== Trades ===
June 28, 2007	To Portland Trail Blazers Steve Francis and Channing Frye	To New York Knicks Dan Dickau, Fred Jones and Zach Randolph
June 28, 2007	To Portland Trail Blazers Second round draft pick (2008)	To New York Knicks Rights to Demetris Nichols
June 28, 2007	To Portland Trail Blazers Rights to Petteri Koponen	To Philadelphia 76ers Rights to Derrick Byars

=== Free agents ===
Player	Former team
Steve Blake	Denver Nuggets

Player	New team
Jamaal Magloire	New Jersey Nets
Ime Udoka	San Antonio Spurs

== See also ==
- 2007–08 NBA season
