= Brandon Roy =

American basketball player and coach (born 1984)

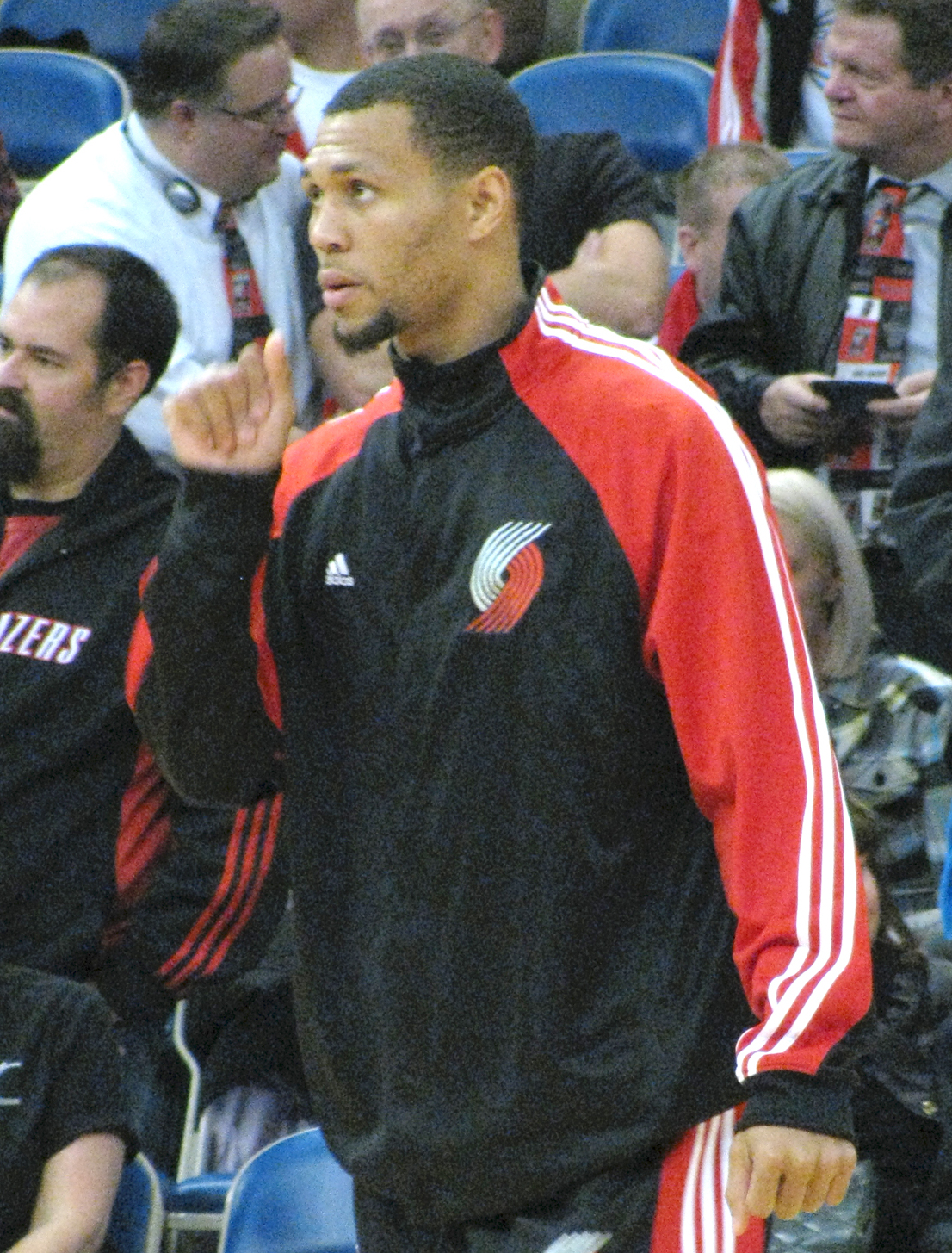
- Roy with the Portland Trail Blazers in 2009

Garfield HS

Personal information
- Born: July 23, 1984 (age 42) Seattle, Washington, U.S.
- Listed height: 6 ft 6 in (1.98 m)
- Listed weight: 211 lb (96 kg)

Career information
- High school: Garfield (Seattle, Washington)
- College: Washington (2002–2006)
- NBA draft: 2006: 1st round, 6th overall pick
- Drafted by: Portland Trail Blazers
- Playing career: 2006–2011, 2012–2013
- Position: Shooting guard
- Number: 7, 3
- Coaching career: 2016–present

Career history

Playing
- 2006–2011: Portland Trail Blazers
- 2012–2013: Minnesota Timberwolves

Coaching
- 2016–2017: Nathan Hale HS
- 2017–2018, 2019–2020, 2022–2025, 2026–present: Garfield HS

Career highlights
- As player: 3× NBA All-Star (2008–2010); All-NBA Second Team (2009); All-NBA Third Team (2010); NBA Rookie of the Year (2007); NBA All-Rookie First Team (2007); Consensus first-team All-American (2006); Pac-10 Player of the Year (2006); First-team All-Pac-10 (2006); No. 3 retired by Washington Huskies; As coach: Naismith National HS Coach of the Year (2017); 4x WIAA 3A State Champion (2017, 2018, 2020, 2023)

Career statistics
- Points: 6,136 (18.8 ppg)
- Rebounds: 1,388 (4.3 rpg)
- Assists: 1,517 (4.7 apg)
- Stats at NBA.com
- Stats at Basketball Reference

Brandon Dawayne Roy Sr. (born July 23, 1984) is an American basketball coach and former professional player. He currently serves as the head coach of the boys' basketball team at Garfield High School in Seattle. Roy played six seasons in the National Basketball Association (NBA) for the Portland Trail Blazers and Minnesota Timberwolves. His nickname was "B-Roy", but he was also referred to as "the Natural" by Trail Blazers announcer Brian Wheeler.

Roy was selected sixth in the 2006 NBA draft by the Trail Blazers, having completed four years playing for the Washington Huskies. He became known for his immediate impact on the Trail Blazers. Roy won the NBA Rookie of the Year Award in a near-unanimous vote in 2007. He was named to two All-NBA teams and as a reserve to the 2008, 2009, and 2010 All-Star Games. In 2011, Roy announced his retirement from basketball due to a degenerative knee condition, though he returned in 2012 to play five games for the Timberwolves.

== Early years ==
Born in Seattle, Washington, Roy attended an African-American Academy elementary school. He first started taking basketball seriously while playing for the Amateur Athletic Union, one of the largest sports organizations in the United States. He attended Garfield High School in Seattle, and was considered one of the state's best high school players. He was an early-entry candidate for the 2002 NBA draft straight out of high school, but he withdrew his name after consideration.

Considered a four-star recruit by Scout.com, Roy was listed as the No. 6 shooting guard and the No. 36 player in the nation in 2002.

== College career ==
Roy faced challenges before entering college. His parents and his older brother had not attended college, and due to a learning disability, Roy had difficulty with the SAT; his reading comprehension was slow, which increased the time he needed for tests. He had taken the test four times (with tutors) before finally meeting the NCAA requirements. Unsure whether he would be able to attend a four-year college, Roy worked on the Seattle docks, cleaning shipping containers for $11 per hour.

In 2002, Roy started to play for the University of Washington (UW). He remained there for four years under head coach Lorenzo Romar. He majored in American Ethnic Studies. After his junior year, Roy considered entering the draft, but changed his mind when he learned that teammate Nate Robinson and high school senior and UW signee Martell Webster intended to enter the draft. He saw an opportunity to rise in the ranks on his college team, and improve his draft position.

On December 29, 2005, Roy led the Huskies to victory over the Arizona State Sun Devils with a college career-high 35 points and became the 31st Washington player to score 1,000 points in a career. The following game he equalled his career high of 35 points in a double overtime loss to the Arizona Wildcats.

During his senior year, Roy averaged 20.2 points per game while leading the Huskies to a 26–7 season and a second straight Sweet Sixteen appearance. Roy was named Pac-10 player of the year and received All-American honors at the end of the season, while also being a finalist for the Wooden, Naismith, Oscar Robertson, and Adolph Rupp awards. Roy had a 2006 pre-draft workout with the Trail Blazers prior to being selected by the Minnesota Timberwolves as the sixth overall pick. However, he was immediately traded to the Trail Blazers for the draft rights of Randy Foye.

On January 22, 2009, before a University of Washington Huskies home game versus the USC Trojans, his number 3 uniform was retired.

== Professional career ==
=== Portland Trail Blazers (2006–2011) ===
==== 2006–07 season: Rookie of the Year ====
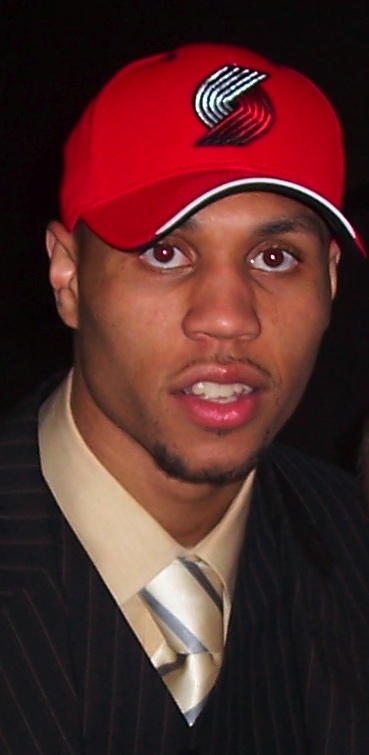
Roy during the 2006 NBA draft

Roy's NBA debut was in his hometown against the Seattle SuperSonics. He scored 20 points in that game and 19 in the following game. An impingement in his left heel kept him out of 20 games early in the season, but he scored his first career double-double shortly after his return, on December 22, 2006, against the Toronto Raptors. At the end of January 2007, Roy led all NBA rookies with 14.5 points per game. He became the fourth Trail Blazer to be selected for the rookie squad of the NBA All-Star Weekend Rookie Challenge since its inception in 1994. He was the first Trail Blazer to participate in the All-Star Weekend since Rasheed Wallace's selection as an All-Star reserve in 2001.

He was the Western Conference's Rookie of the Month in January, February, and March 2007. After averaging 16.8 points, 4.4 rebounds and 4.0 assists per game during the 2006–07 NBA season, Roy was named NBA Rookie of the Year. He received 127 out of 128 first-place votes. Due to injury, he played in only 57 games in that season, the second-fewest games for a Rookie of the Year. He was the third Trail Blazer to win the award, the first two being Geoff Petrie and Sidney Wicks.

==== 2007–08 season: First All-Star selection ====
Roy started in the first 48 games of the 2007–08 season, averaging 19.1 points, 5.8 assists and 4.6 rebounds. He also led the Blazers to a 13-game winning streak in the month of December. Roy was selected as a reserve for the 2008 NBA All-Star Game. He scored 18 points in that game, and also had 9 rebounds. He injured his right ankle in the final game before the All-Star Weekend. Although he earned accolades for his play over the weekend, the injury impacted his play in the following weeks. He played in the Rookie Challenge for the second time, this time as a "sophomore"; teammate LaMarcus Aldridge was also on the sophomore squad. Roy played about 29 minutes in the All-Star game, the most of any Western Conference player. He also tied Chris Paul and Amar'e Stoudemire for the most points with 18.

==== 2008–09 season: First All-NBA selection ====
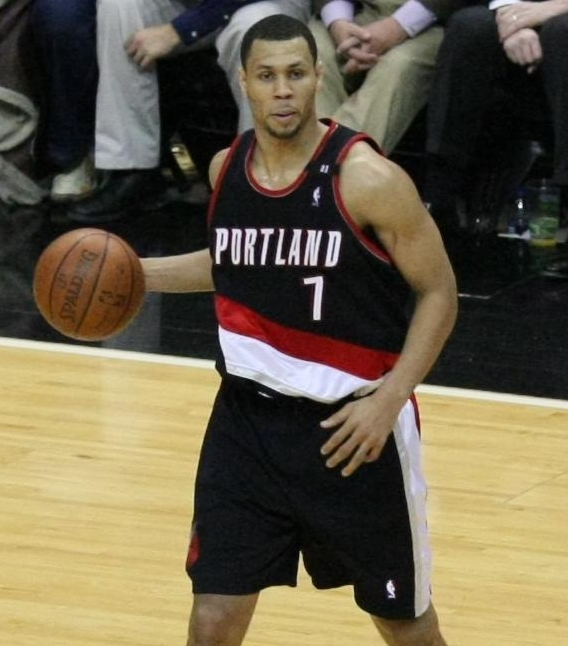
Roy handles the ball during a 2008 game

In the 2008 preseason, Roy underwent a 20-minute medical procedure in Vancouver, Washington, during which team physician Don Roberts removed a piece of cartilage that was causing irritation in Roy's left knee. Roy missed several weeks of action because of the rehabilitation, but was ready on the opening day of the season against the Los Angeles Lakers. On November 6, against the Houston Rockets, Roy hit a game-winning 30-foot jumper in overtime with eight tenths of a second left.

On December 18, Roy scored a career-high 52 points against the Phoenix Suns. He made 14 of 27 shots from the field, 19 of 21 from the free-throw line, and 5 of 7 from the three-point line. He also added six assists, five rebounds and a blocked shot, all without a turnover. On January 24, Roy tied a Blazers franchise record with 10 steals against the Washington Wizards. On February 8 with the Blazers trailing by 1 against the Knicks, Roy made a layup at the buzzer to win it 109–108. As of February 16, 2009, Roy has had 24 shots which tied or won the games with 35 seconds or less. Roy was again selected as a reserve in the 2009 NBA All-Star Game, where he scored 14 points in 7-for-8 shooting, grabbed 5 boards, and dished out 5 assists in a game-high 31 minutes of action. On April 13, Roy was named Western Conference Player of the Week for his fourth time. At the time, Clyde Drexler was the only other Portland Trail Blazers to have won the award four times. Roy finished 9th in MVP voting for the 2008–09 season, garnering one 4th-place vote and four 5th-place votes for a total of 7 points. Roy was named to the All-NBA Second Team on May 13, and was the first Blazer to make an All-NBA team since the 1991–92 season.

==== 2009–10 season: Second All-NBA selection ====
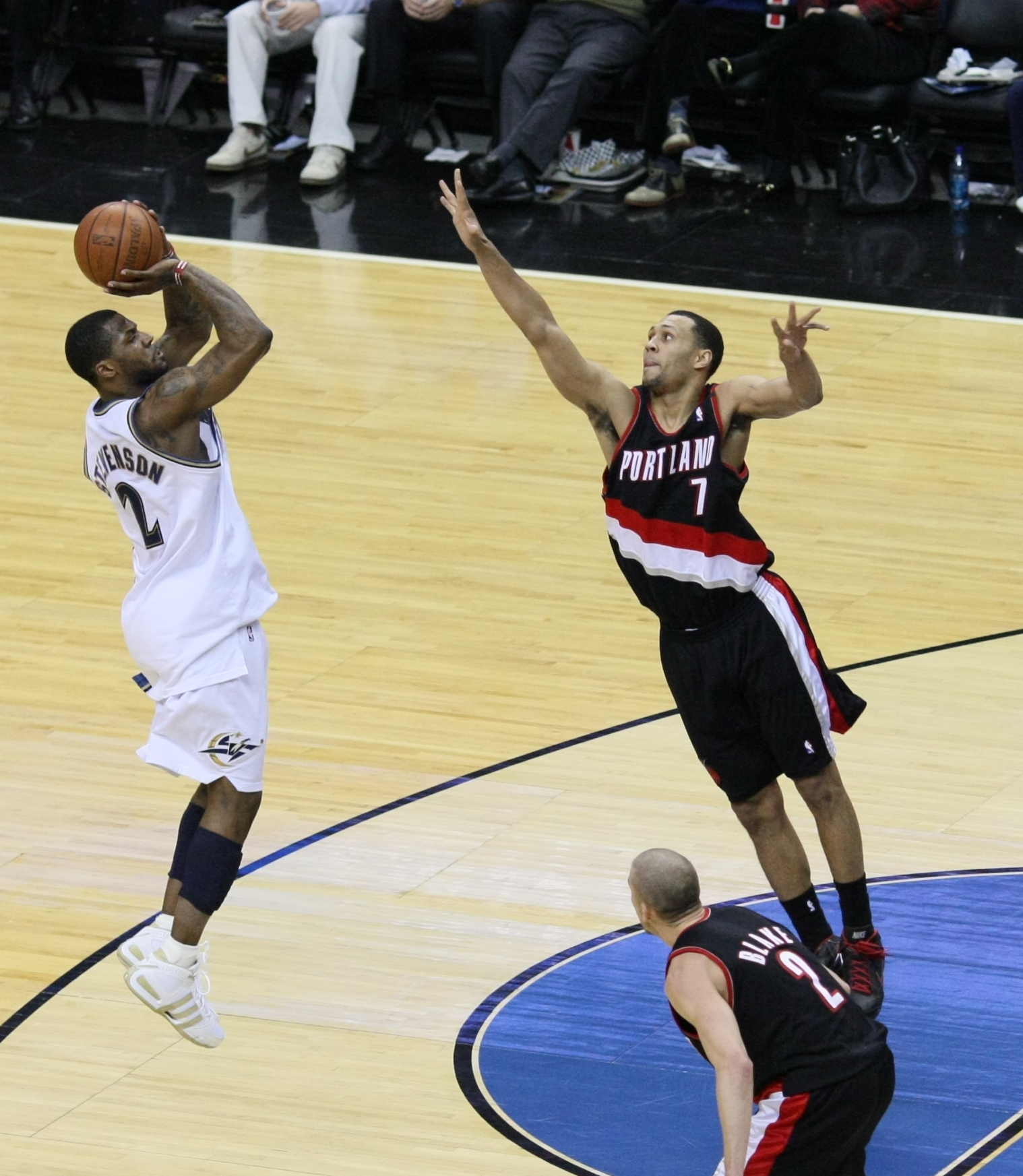
Roy defending DeShawn Stevenson in a game

On August 5, 2009, it was confirmed that Roy had agreed to a four-year maximum-salary contract with a fifth-year player option, keeping him a Trail Blazer until at least the 2013–14 season.

Roy was selected to compete in the 2010 NBA All-Star Game, marking his third selection as an NBA All-Star. However, Roy was sidelined because of a right hamstring injury he sustained on January 13 against the Milwaukee Bucks, and re-aggravated on January 20 against the Philadelphia 76ers.

On April 11, 2010, Roy injured his right knee. Magnetic resonance imaging that night confirmed a right knee bone contusion (bone bruise) and on April 12, further examination of the MRI showed a slight meniscus tear. Roy underwent surgery on April 16 and was expected to miss at least the first round of the 2010 NBA playoffs, but returned for Game 4 after eight days of recovery time to lead the Blazers to a win.

Roy was named to the All-NBA Third Team on May 6, and this was his second season in a row to be named to an All-NBA Team. Shortly before the next season began, conference rival Kobe Bryant called Roy the hardest player to guard in the Western Conference, claiming he had "no weaknesses in his game."

Roy was the cover athlete for NBA 10: The Inside.

==== 2010–11 season: Final season in Portland ====
Roy started the first month of the season scoring at his normal rate, but by December it started showing that his knees, which have bothered him since college and were injured in April, were ailing due to lack of cartilage. He missed nine games before the Trail Blazers announced that he would be out indefinitely.

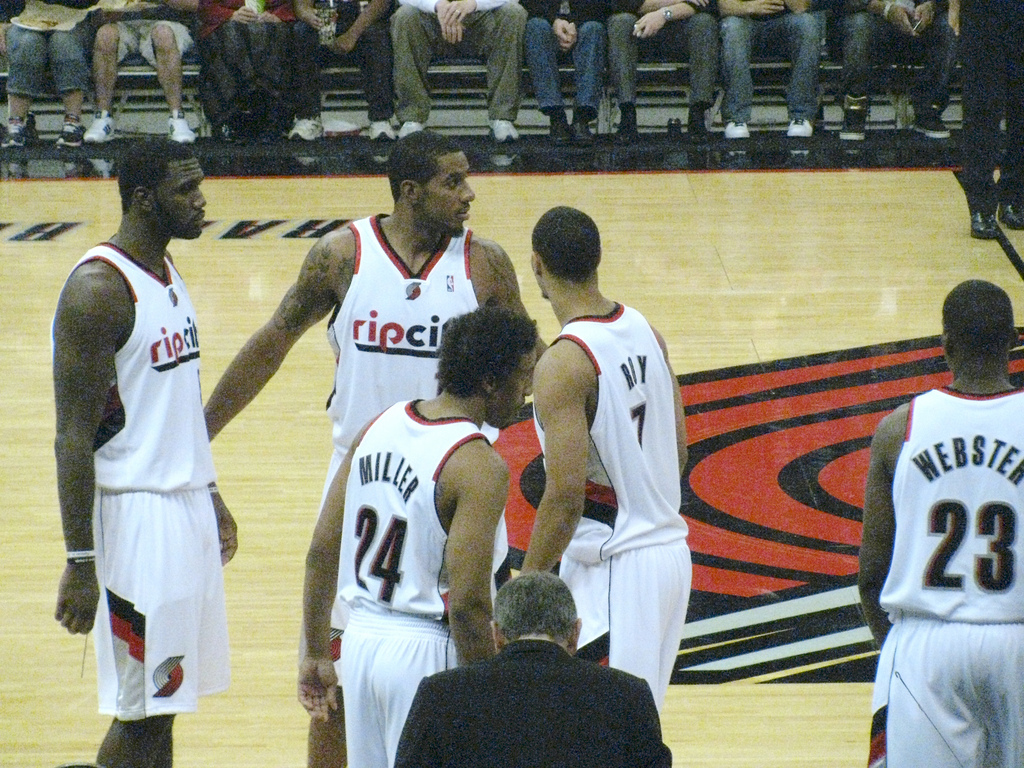
Roy with his Portland teammates

On January 17, 2011, Roy underwent arthroscopic surgery on both of his knees. He returned to the lineup on February 25, scoring 18 points off the bench, including a clutch three-pointer to force overtime, and helping the Blazers defeat the Denver Nuggets 107–106.

The Blazers then faced the Dallas Mavericks in the first round of the 2011 NBA playoffs. Roy shot 1-for-8 the first 2 games, including a Game 2 where he saw only 8 minutes of playing time and went scoreless. The Blazers lost both games and trailed 2–0 in the series. He expressed his frustration about being the last substitution during the first 2 quarters, and playing for 8 minutes after getting 26 minutes in Game 1.

Both the Blazers and Mavericks started Game 4 with a quiet first half, with Dallas leading slightly. The Blazers then missed their first 15 shots after halftime as the Mavs' lead grew as big as 67–44. Roy then made a three-pointer near the end of the third to cut the lead to 67–49. In the fourth quarter, Roy scored 18 points after going 1-for-3 the previous 3 quarters, including a clutch 4-point play to tie the game and a bank shot from the middle of the paint with 49 seconds left to give his team the lead for good, finishing with 24 points to lead the Blazers to an improbable 84–82 win to tie the series.

Just before NBA training camp opened following the resolution of the 2011 NBA lockout, Roy announced that his knees had degenerated so much—he lacked cartilage between the bones of both knees—that he was retiring from basketball.

Following his announcement of retirement, the Portland Trail Blazers used their amnesty clause on Roy for salary cap flexibility.

=== Minnesota Timberwolves (2012–2013) ===
In June 2012, Roy announced that he was planning to make a comeback to the NBA. He said he had recovered enough to play after having the platelet-rich plasma procedure that Kobe Bryant also had to keep his knees healthy. He could not play for Portland under the current NBA Collective Bargaining Agreement because of Portland's amnesty of him in 2011. Roy entered the free agent market on July 1, 2012. Roy reportedly had expressed interest in signing with the Dallas Mavericks, Golden State Warriors, Minnesota Timberwolves, Indiana Pacers, or Chicago Bulls.

On July 31, 2012, Roy signed with the Minnesota Timberwolves. The deal put Roy with All-Star forward Kevin Love and point guard Ricky Rubio. He decided to wear No. 3, the number he wore during his college years at Washington. He felt well during training camp but suffered an injury after a collision during a preseason game on October 26, 2012. He played in five regular season games before needing season-ending surgery on his right knee. He averaged 5.8 points per game, 2.8 rebounds per game, and 4.6 assists per game in 24.4 minutes during the 2012–13 season. Roy was waived by Minnesota on May 10, 2013. Afterwards, he said, "Any time you walk away from the game, you have 'what-ifs'. I feel like I was able to answer those questions last year by going out there and giving it a try."

== Coaching career ==
After ending his playing career, Roy joined Nathan Hale High School as the head coach of the boys' basketball team in 2016. In March 2017, he received the Naismith National High School Coach of the Year award after his team posted a perfect 29–0 record during the regular season.

With the departure of Michael Porter Jr., Jontay Porter, and P. J. Fuller, Roy was named as head coach of Garfield High School's boys' basketball team in May 2017. He stepped down as head coach during the 2018–19 season for undisclosed reasons but returned in 2019. He stepped down again following the 2019–20 season but returned in 2022.

== Career statistics ==
Legend
| GP | Games played | GS | Games started | MPG | Minutes per game |
| FG% | Field goal percentage | 3P% | 3-point field goal percentage | FT% | Free throw percentage |
| RPG | Rebounds per game | APG | Assists per game | SPG | Steals per game |
| BPG | Blocks per game | PPG | Points per game | **Bold** | Career high |

=== NBA ===
==== Regular season ====
| Year | Team | GP | GS | MPG | FG% | 3P% | FT% | RPG | APG | SPG | BPG | PPG |
|---|---|---|---|---|---|---|---|---|---|---|---|---|
| 2006–07 | Portland | 57 | 55 | 35.4 | .456 | **.377** | .838 | 4.4 | 4.0 | **1.2** | .2 | 16.8 |
| 2007–08 | Portland | 74 | 74 | **37.7** | .454 | .340 | .753 | **4.7** | **5.8** | 1.1 | .2 | 19.1 |
| 2008–09 | Portland | **78** | **78** | 37.2 | **.480** | **.377** | .824 | **4.7** | 5.1 | 1.1 | **.3** | **22.6** |
| 2009–10 | Portland | 65 | 65 | 37.2 | .473 | .330 | .780 | 4.4 | 4.7 | .9 | .2 | 21.5 |
| 2010–11 | Portland | 47 | 23 | 27.9 | .400 | .333 | **.848** | 2.6 | 2.7 | .8 | **.3** | 12.2 |
| 2012–13 | Minnesota | 5 | 5 | 24.4 | .314 | .000 | .700 | 2.8 | 4.6 | .6 | .0 | 5.8 |
| Career | | 326 | 300 | 35.5 | .459 | .348 | .800 | 4.3 | 4.7 | 1.0 | .2 | 18.8 |
| All-Star | | 2 | 0 | 30.0 | .833 | .667 | .000 | 7.0 | 5.0 | .5 | .5 | 16.0 |

==== Playoffs ====
| Year | Team | GP | GS | MPG | FG% | 3P% | FT% | RPG | APG | SPG | BPG | PPG |
|---|---|---|---|---|---|---|---|---|---|---|---|---|
| 2009 | Portland | **6** | **6** | **39.7** | .459 | **.471** | **.870** | **4.8** | **2.8** | **1.3** | **1.2** | **26.7** |
| 2010 | Portland | 3 | 1 | 27.7 | .303 | .167 | .778 | 2.3 | 1.7 | .0 | .0 | 9.7 |
| 2011 | Portland | **6** | 0 | 23.0 | **.500** | .286 | .615 | 2.1 | **2.8** | .2 | .0 | 9.3 |
| Career | | 15 | 7 | 30.6 | .442 | .326 | .809 | 3.3 | 2.6 | .5 | .6 | 16.3 |

=== College ===
| Year | Team | GP | GS | MPG | FG% | 3P% | FT% | RPG | APG | SPG | BPG | PPG |
|---|---|---|---|---|---|---|---|---|---|---|---|---|
| 2002–03 | Washington | 13 | 2 | 17.2 | .500 | .100 | .486 | 2.9 | 1.0 | .3 | .2 | 6.1 |
| 2003–04 | Washington | 31 | 31 | 30.3 | .480 | .222 | .785 | 5.3 | 3.3 | 1.2 | .4 | 12.9 |
| 2004–05 | Washington | 26 | 5 | 24.2 | **.565** | .350 | .741 | 5.0 | 2.2 | .6 | .3 | 12.8 |
| 2005–06 | Washington | **33** | **33** | **31.7** | .508 | **.402** | **.810** | **5.6** | **4.1** | **1.4** | **.8** | **20.2** |
| Career | | 103 | 71 | 27.6 | .513 | .297 | .744 | 5.0 | 3.0 | 1.0 | .5 | 14.4 |

== Personal life ==
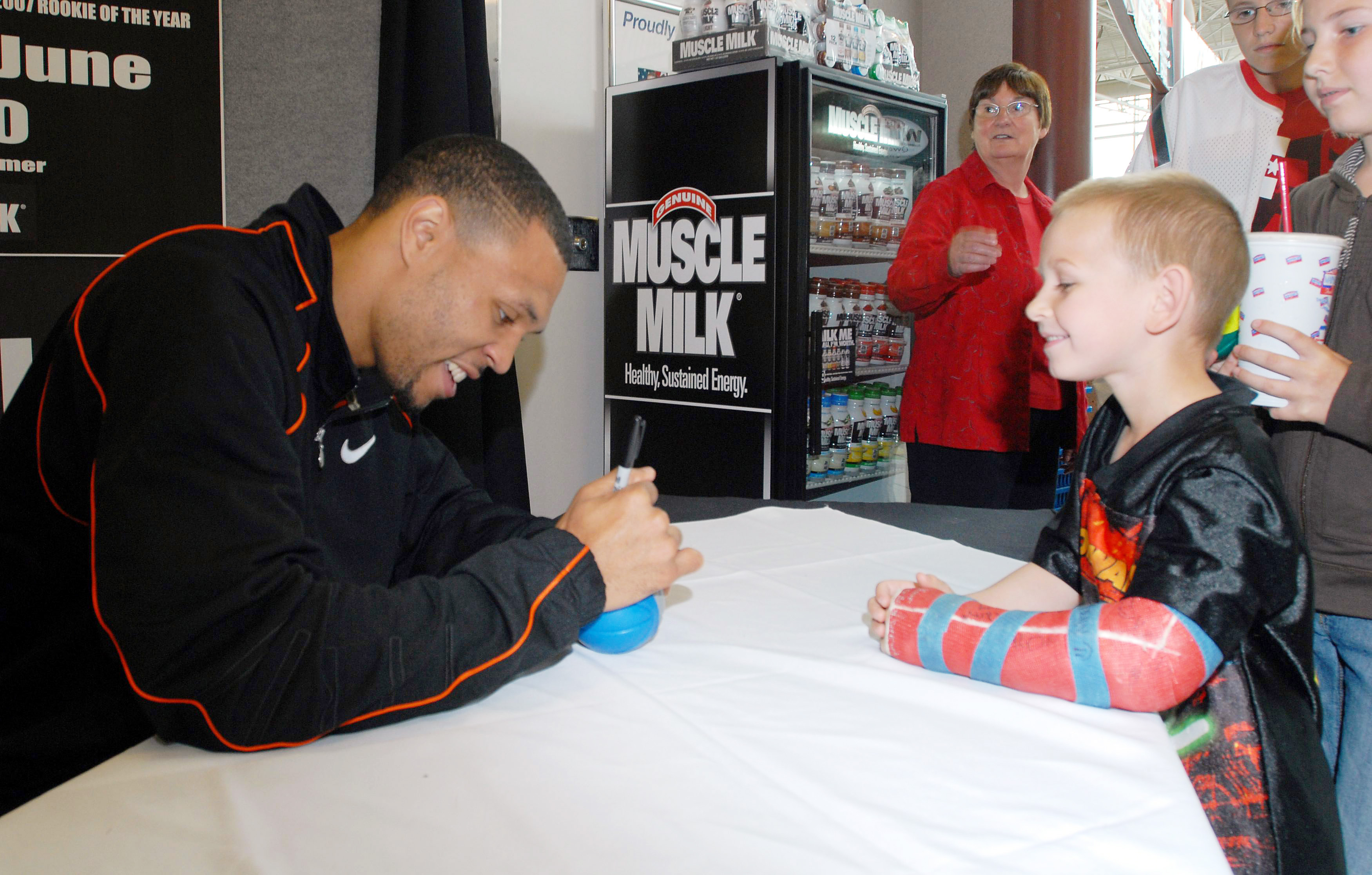
Roy signing an autograph

Roy's longtime girlfriend Tiana Bardwell delivered their first child, Brandon Jr., whom they nicknamed BJ, on March 27, 2007, in Seattle. BJ also played at Garfield High School and plays at the University of Washington.

Roy and Bardwell had their second child, Mariah Leilani, in January 2009. They were married on September 4, 2010, in West Linn, Oregon.

On April 29, 2017, Roy was shot and received non-life-threatening injuries while attending a party at his grandmother's home in Compton, California.

== See also ==
- List of National Basketball Association single-game steals leaders
