= 2008–09 Houston Rockets season =

- Head coach: Rick Adelman
- General manager: Daryl Morey
- Owners: Leslie Alexander
- Arena: Toyota Center

Results
- Record: 53–29 (.646)
- Place: Division: 2nd (Southwest); Conference: 5th (Western)
- Playoff finish: Conference Semifinals (lost to Lakers 3–4)
- Stats at Basketball Reference

Local media
- Television: My Network TV Houston, FSN Houston
- Radio: Sports Radio 610

The 2008–09 Houston Rockets season was the 42nd season of the franchise in the National Basketball Association (NBA). Despite a season-ending knee injury to Tracy McGrady, the Rockets breezed past the Portland Trail Blazers in the first round, but could not defeat the Los Angeles Lakers in the second round. Dikembe Mutombo, who entered his 18th and final season, was injured in Game 2 of the first round and announced his retirement, ending his 18-year NBA career. Besides losing Mutombo, Yao Ming missed most of the second round due to a foot injury that required off-season surgery. Before the season, the team acquired Ron Artest (now Metta World Peace). Following the season, Artest signed as a free agent with the Lakers. The Rockets would not return to the postseason until 2013.

== Key dates ==
- June 26: The 2008 NBA draft will take place in New York City.
- July 1: The free agency period will start.
- August 14: Ron Artest is acquired by trade from the Sacramento Kings .

== Draft picks ==
Round	Pick	Player	Position	Nationality	College
1	25	Nicolas Batum	SF	France	Le Mans Sarthe Basket
2	54	Maarty Leunen	SF	United States	Oregon

== Roster ==
2008-09 Houston Rockets roster
Players

Pos.	No.	Player	Height	Weight	DOB	From
SF	96	Ron Artest	6 ft 7 in (2.01 m)	260 lb (118 kg)		St. John's
SG	17	Brent Barry	6 ft 7 in (2.01 m)	210 lb (95 kg)		Oregon State
SG	31	Shane Battier	6 ft 8 in (2.03 m)	220 lb (100 kg)		Duke
PG	0	Aaron Brooks	6 ft 0 in (1.83 m)	161 lb (73 kg)		Oregon
PF	43	Brian Cook	6 ft 9 in (2.06 m)	250 lb (113 kg)		Illinois
PF	15	Joey Dorsey	6 ft 8 in (2.03 m)	268 lb (122 kg)		Memphis
C	44	Chuck Hayes	6 ft 6 in (1.98 m)	238 lb (108 kg)		Kentucky
PF	14	Carl Landry	6 ft 9 in (2.06 m)	248 lb (112 kg)		Purdue
PG	7	Kyle Lowry	6 ft 0 in (1.83 m)	205 lb (93 kg)		Villanova
SG	1	Tracy McGrady	6 ft 8 in (2.03 m)	223 lb (101 kg)		Mt. Zion Christian Academy (NC)
C	55	Dikembe Mutombo	7 ft 2 in (2.18 m)	260 lb (118 kg)		Georgetown
PF	4	Luis Scola	6 ft 9 in (2.06 m)	245 lb (111 kg)		Argentina
SG	13	Von Wafer	6 ft 5 in (1.96 m)	210 lb (95 kg)		Florida State
SF	8	James White	6 ft 7 in (2.01 m)	200 lb (91 kg)		Cincinnati
C	11	Yao Ming	7 ft 6 in (2.29 m)	310 lb (141 kg)		People's Republic of China

Coaches
Head coach
- Rick Adelman (Loyola Marymount)
Assistant(s)
- Elston Turner (Mississippi)
- Jack Sikma (Illinois Wesleyan)
- T. R. Dunn (Alabama)
- R.J. Adelman (Willamette)

Legend
- (DP) Unsigned draft pick
- (FA) Free agent
- (S) Suspended
- Injured

== Regular season ==
=== Standings ===
Southwest Division	W	L	PCT	GB	Home	Road	Div
y-San Antonio Spurs	54	28	.659	—	28–13	26–15	10–6
x-Houston Rockets	53	29	.646	1	33–8	20–21	9–7
x-Dallas Mavericks	50	32	.610	4	32–9	18–23	7–9
x-New Orleans Hornets	49	33	.598	5	28–13	21–20	9–7
Memphis Grizzlies	24	58	.284	30	16–25	8–33	5–11

#	Western Conference				
#	Team	W	L	PCT	GB
1	c-Los Angeles Lakers	65	17	.793	—
2	y-Denver Nuggets	54	28	.659	11
3	y-San Antonio Spurs	54	28	.659	11
4	x-Portland Trail Blazers	54	28	.659	11
5	x-Houston Rockets	53	29	.646	12
6	x-Dallas Mavericks	50	32	.610	15
7	x-New Orleans Hornets	49	33	.598	16
8	x-Utah Jazz	48	34	.585	17
9	Phoenix Suns	46	36	.561	19
10	Golden State Warriors	29	53	.354	36
11	Memphis Grizzlies	24	58	.293	41
12	Minnesota Timberwolves	24	58	.293	41
13	Oklahoma City Thunder	23	59	.280	42
14	Los Angeles Clippers	19	63	.232	46
15	Sacramento Kings	17	65	.207	48

=== Game log ===
2008–09 game log
Total: 53–29 (home: 33–8; road: 20–21)
October: 2–0 (home: 1–0; road: 1–0)

Game	Date	Team	Score	High points	High rebounds	High assists	Location Attendance	Record
1	October 29	Memphis	W 82–71	Yao Ming (21)	Luis Scola (13)	Tracy McGrady (5)	Toyota Center; 18,196	1–0
2	October 30	@ Dallas	W 112–102	Yao Ming (30)	Yao Ming (13)	Tracy McGrady (7)	American Airlines Center; 20,066	2–0

November: 9–7 (home: 3–3; road: 6–4)

Game	Date	Team	Score	High points	High rebounds	High assists	Location Attendance	Record
3	November 1	Oklahoma City	W 89–77	Tracy McGrady (22)	Carl Landry, Yao Ming (11)	Tracy McGrady (5)	Toyota Center; 16,996	3–0
4	November 4	Boston	L 99–103	Tracy McGrady (26)	Luis Scola (9)	Rafer Alston (7)	Toyota Center; 18,291	3–1
5	November 6	@ Portland	L 99–101 (OT)	Tracy McGrady (30)	Tracy McGrady, Chuck Hayes (7)	Tracy McGrady (8)	Rose Garden; 20,611	3–2
6	November 7	@ L.A. Clippers	W 92–83	Ron Artest (23)	Carl Landry, Yao Ming (9)	Rafer Alston (8)	Staples Center; 14,670	4–2
7	November 9	@ L.A. Lakers	L 82–111	Aaron Brooks (20)	Luis Scola (9)	Aaron Brooks, Tracy McGrady (4)	Staples Center; 18,997	4–3
8	November 12	@ Phoenix	W 94–82	Tracy McGrady (27)	Yao Ming (15)	Rafer Alston (4)	US Airways Center; 18,422	5–3
9	November 14	@ San Antonio	L 75–77	Ron Artest (18)	Aaron Brooks, Yao Ming (8)	Tracy McGrady (5)	AT&T Center; 18,797	5–4
10	November 15	New Orleans	W 91–82	Yao Ming (21)	Luis Scola (10)	Ron Artest (7)	Toyota Center; 18,303	6–4
11	November 17	@ Oklahoma City	W 100–89	Luis Scola (23)	Yao Ming (12)	Aaron Brooks (4)	Ford Center; 18,145	7–4
12	November 19	Dallas	L 86–96	Rafer Alston, Tracy McGrady (16)	Ron Artest (13)	Rafer Alston (8)	Toyota Center; 18,203	7–5
13	November 21	@ Washington	W 103–91	Tracy McGrady (20)	Ron Artest (9)	Ron Artest (6)	Verizon Center; 20,173	8–5
14	November 22	@ Orlando	W 100–95	Yao Ming (22)	Yao Ming (13)	Rafer Alston (7)	Amway Arena; 17,461	9–5
15	November 24	@ Miami	W 107–98	Yao Ming (28)	Luis Scola (13)	Yao Ming, Tracy McGrady (4)	American Airlines Arena; 18,704	10–5
16	November 26	Indiana	L 90–91	Ron Artest, Yao Ming (19)	Luis Scola (18)	Rafer Alston (7)	Toyota Center; 18,194	10–6
17	November 29	San Antonio	W 103–84	Luther Head (21)	Ron Artest (8)	Rafer Alston (6)	Toyota Center; 18,282	11–6
18	November 30	@ Denver	L 94–104	Yao Ming (18)	Yao Ming (11)	Rafer Alston (6)	Pepsi Center; 17,201	11–7

December: 10–5 (home: 7–1; road: 3–4)

Game	Date	Team	Score	High points	High rebounds	High assists	Location Attendance	Record
19	December 3	L.A. Clippers	W 103–96	Yao Ming (24)	Yao Ming (10)	Rafer Alston (7)	Toyota Center; 15,358	12–7
20	December 5	Golden State	W 131–112	Yao Ming (33)	Yao Ming (14)	Yao Ming, Ron Artest (5)	Toyota Center; 14,438	13–7
21	December 8	@ Memphis	L 97–109	Luis Scola, Rafer Alston (16)	Luis Scola (15)	Rafer Alston (8)	FedExForum; 10,691	13–8
22	December 9	Atlanta	W 92–84	Yao Ming (24)	Yao Ming (19)	Rafer Alston (6)	Toyota Center; 16,439	14–8
23	December 12	@ Golden State	W 119–108	Tracy McGrady (24)	Yao Ming (14)	Tracy McGrady (9)	Oracle Arena; 19,276	15–8
24	December 13	@ L.A. Clippers	L 82–95	Yao Ming (24)	Yao Ming (13)	Rafer Alston (7)	Staples Center; 16,203	15–9
25	December 16	Denver	W 108–96	Yao Ming (32)	Tracy McGrady (14)	Tracy McGrady (10)	Toyota Center; 17,737	16–9
26	December 19	Sacramento	W 107–96	Yao Ming (30)	Carl Landry (11)	Tracy McGrady (8)	Toyota Center; 18,271	17–9
27	December 20	@ Minnesota	W 109–102	Tracy McGrady (23)	Aaron Brooks, Chuck Hayes (10)	Tracy McGrady, Aaron Brooks (5)	Target Center; 12,115	18–9
28	December 22	@ New Jersey	W 114–91	Yao Ming (24)	Yao Ming (16)	Aaron Brooks (6)	Izod Center; 16,303	19–9
29	December 23	@ Cleveland	L 90–99	Rafer Alston (20)	Luis Scola (8)	Tracy McGrady (6)	Quicken Loans Arena; 20,562	19–10
30	December 26	@ New Orleans	L 79–88	Yao Ming (19)	Yao Ming (12)	Tracy McGrady (4)	New Orleans Arena; 18,326	19–11
31	December 27	Utah	W 120–115 (2OT)	Ron Artest (28)	Luis Scola (14)	Ron Artest, Luis Scola (4)	Toyota Center; 18,245	20–11
32	December 29	Washington	L 87–89	Ron Artest (20)	Yao Ming (8)	Tracy McGrady (7)	Toyota Center; 18,278	20–12
33	December 31	Milwaukee	W 85–81	Yao Ming (22)	Yao Ming, Luis Scola (10)	Tracy McGrady (10)	Toyota Center; 18,228	21–12

January: 8–7 (home: 5–2; road: 3–5)

Game	Date	Team	Score	High points	High rebounds	High assists	Location Attendance	Record
34	January 2	@ Toronto	L 73–94	Von Wafer (18)	Luis Scola (13)	Rafer Alston (4)	Air Canada Centre; 19,800	21–13
35	January 3	@ Atlanta	L 100–103	Carl Landry (18)	Yao Ming (15)	Rafer Alston (9)	Philips Arena; 16,740	21–14
36	January 6	@ Philadelphia	L 96–104	Luis Scola (18)	Luis Scola (17)	Tracy McGrady (9)	Wachovia Center; 14,858	21–15
37	January 7	@ Boston	W 89–85	Yao Ming (26)	Yao Ming, Chuck Hayes (8)	Yao Ming, Aaron Brooks, Ron Artest (4)	TD Banknorth Garden; 18,624	22–15
38	January 9	@ Oklahoma City	W 98–96	Tracy McGrady (26)	Yao Ming (7)	Rafer Alston (6)	Ford Center; 19,136	23–15
39	January 10	New York	W 96–76	Luis Scola (18)	Luis Scola (11)	Rafer Alston (6)	Toyota Center; 18,280	24–15
40	January 13	L.A. Lakers	L 100–105	Von Wafer (23)	Yao Ming (17)	Rafer Alston (6)	Toyota Center; 18,557	24–16
41	January 17	Miami	W 93–86	Yao Ming (26)	Yao Ming (10)	Shane Battier (6)	Toyota Center; 18,369	25–16
42	January 19	Denver	W 115–113	Yao Ming (31)	Luis Scola (8)	Rafer Alston (11)	Toyota Center; 18,199	26–16
43	January 21	Utah	W 108–99	Rafer Alston (23)	Yao Ming (12)	Rafer Alston (8)	Toyota Center; 17,037	27–16
44	January 23	@ Indiana	L 102–107	Luis Scola (25)	Shane Battier (12)	Rafer Alston (8)	Conseco Fieldhouse; 14,486	27–17
45	January 25	@ Detroit	W 108–105	Ron Artest (24)	Ron Artest (9)	Rafer Alston (10)	The Palace of Auburn Hills; 22,076	28–17
46	January 26	@ New York	L 98–104	Tracy McGrady (20)	Luis Scola (14)	Tracy McGrady (6)	Madison Square Garden; 19,155	28–18
47	January 28	Philadelphia	L 93–95	Tracy McGrady (24)	Luis Scola (10)	Rafer Alston (9)	Toyota Center; 15,544	28–19
48	January 31	Golden State	W 110–93	Ron Artest (27)	Yao Ming (11)	Aaron Brooks (9)	Toyota Center; 16,702	29–19

February: 8–3 (home: 8–0; road: 0–3)

Game	Date	Team	Score	High points	High rebounds	High assists	Location Attendance	Record
49	February 3	Chicago	W 107–100	Yao Ming (28)	Luis Scola (18)	Tracy McGrady, Ron Artest (6)	Toyota Center; 16,653	30–19
50	February 4	@ Memphis	L 93–104	Tracy McGrady (21)	Yao Ming (9)	Rafer Alston (6)	FedExForum; 10,109	30–20
51	February 7	Minnesota	W 107–90	Yao Ming (30)	Luis Scola (10)	Rafer Alston, Ron Artest, Shane Battier (6)	Toyota Center; 16,815	31–20
52	February 9	@ Milwaukee	L 112–124	Aaron Brooks (23)	Yao Ming (10)	Tracy McGrady (5)	Bradley Center; 13,904	31–21
53	February 11	Sacramento	W 94–82	Yao Ming (24)	Yao Ming (18)	Rafer Alston (13)	Toyota Center; 15,626	32–21
54	February 17	New Jersey	W 114–88	Yao Ming (20)	Yao Ming (12)	Rafer Alston (11)	Toyota Center; 14,921	33–21
55	February 20	Dallas	W 93–86	Yao Ming (22)	Luis Scola (15)	Aaron Brooks (8)	Toyota Center; 18,195	34–21
56	February 22	Charlotte	W 99–78	Ron Artest (26)	Luis Scola (10)	Shane Battier (5)	Toyota Center; 17,124	35–21
57	February 24	Portland	W 98–94	Ron Artest (21)	Luis Scola (11)	Ron Artest (5)	Toyota Center; 17,515	36–21
58	February 26	Cleveland	W 93–74	Yao Ming (28)	Luis Scola (9)	Kyle Lowry, Aaron Brooks (7)	Toyota Center; 18,399	37–21
59	February 28	@ Chicago	L 102–105	Ron Artest (32)	Luis Scola (12)	Aaron Brooks (7)	United Center; 22,394	37–22

March: 11–4 (home: 6–2; road: 5–2)

Game	Date	Team	Score	High points	High rebounds	High assists	Location Attendance	Record
60	March 1	@ Minnesota	W 105–94	Ron Artest (23)	Yao Ming, Luis Scola (11)	Aaron Brooks (10)	Target Center; 13,716	38–22
61	March 3	Toronto	W 107–97	Carl Landry (22)	Luis Scola (16)	Ron Artest, Aaron Brooks (5)	Toyota Center; 16,291	39–22
62	March 4	@ Utah	L 94–101	Ron Artest (25)	Yao Ming (7)	Yao Ming (6)	EnergySolutions Arena; 19,911	39–23
63	March 6	Phoenix	W 116–112	Aaron Brooks (30)	Yao Ming (13)	Yao Ming (6)	Toyota Center; 18,045	40–23
64	March 8	Memphis	W 93–83	Yao Ming (24)	Yao Ming (17)	Kyle Lowry (9)	Toyota Center; 16,179	41–23
65	March 9	@ Denver	W 97–95	Ron Artest (22)	Luis Scola (15)	Kyle Lowry (5)	Pepsi Center; 16,020	42–23
66	March 11	L.A. Lakers	L 96–102	Von Wafer (20)	Luis Scola (9)	Kyle Lowry (5)	Toyota Center; 18,449	42–24
67	March 13	@ Charlotte	W 91–86	Yao Ming (23)	Yao Ming (8)	Ron Artest, Shane Battier (4)	Time Warner Cable Arena; 16,809	43–24
68	March 14	San Antonio	L 85–88	Ron Artest (21)	Yao Ming (11)	Shane Battier (4)	Toyota Center; 18,300	43–25
69	March 16	@ New Orleans	W 95–84	Ron Artest (18)	Luis Scola (12)	Ron Artest, Von Wafer (5)	New Orleans Arena; 17,723	44–25
70	March 18	Detroit	W 106–101 (2OT)	Yao Ming (31)	Yao Ming (15)	Shane Battier (5)	Toyota Center; 18,275	45–25
71	March 20	Minnesota	W 107–88	Ron Artest (20)	Luis Scola (9)	Ron Artest (6)	Toyota Center; 17,456	46–25
72	March 22	@ San Antonio	W 87–85	Ron Artest (24)	Luis Scola (17)	Luis Scola (4)	AT&T Center; 18,797	47–25
73	March 24	@ Utah	L 86–99	Aaron Brooks (20)	Yao Ming (13)	Ron Artest (7)	EnergySolutions Arena; 19,911	47–26
74	March 28	L.A. Clippers	W 110–93	Aaron Brooks, Yao Ming (21)	Yao Ming (15)	Kyle Lowry, Shane Battier (4)	Toyota Center; 18,267	48–26

April: 5–3 (home: 3–0; road: 2–3)

Game	Date	Team	Score	High points	High rebounds	High assists	Location Attendance	Record
75	April 1	@ Phoenix	L 109–114	Ron Artest (28)	Yao Ming (14)	Aaron Brooks (5)	US Airways Center; 18,422	48–27
76	April 3	@ L.A. Lakers	L 81–93	Ron Artest (21)	Yao Ming (10)	Aaron Brooks (6)	Staples Center; 18,997	48–28
77	April 5	Portland	W 102–88	Yao Ming (21)	Yao Ming (12)	Kyle Lowry (6)	Toyota Center; 18,214	49–28
78	April 7	Orlando	W 93–83	Yao Ming (20)	Yao Ming (16)	Ron Artest (7)	Toyota Center; 18,389	50–28
79	April 9	@ Sacramento	W 115–98	Ron Artest (26)	Yao Ming (9)	Von Wafer, Aaron Brooks, Ron Artest, Yao Ming (3)	ARCO Arena; 12,897	51–28
80	April 10	@ Golden State	W 113–109	Luis Scola (28)	Dikembe Mutombo (15)	Ron Artest (6)	Oracle Arena; 19,596	52–28
81	April 13	New Orleans	W 86–66	Yao Ming (22)	Luis Scola (15)	Ron Artest (5)	Toyota Center; 18,409	53–28
82	April 15	@ Dallas	L 84–95	Yao Ming (23)	Yao Ming (9)	Kyle Lowry, Ron Artest (5)	American Airlines Center; 20,350	53–29

2008–09 schedule

== Playoffs ==
2009 playoff game log
First Round: 4–2 (home: 3–0; road: 1–2)

Game	Date	Team	Score	High points	High rebounds	High assists	Location Attendance	Series
1	April 18	@ Portland	W 108–81	Aaron Brooks (27)	Dikembe Mutombo (9)	Aaron Brooks (7)	Rose Garden Arena; 20,329	1–0
2	April 21	@ Portland	L 103–107	Aaron Brooks (23)	Yao Ming (8)	Aaron Brooks (5)	Rose Garden Arena; 20,408	1–1
3	April 24	Portland	W 86–83	Luis Scola (19)	Yao Ming (13)	Aaron Brooks (5)	Toyota Center; 18,731	2–1
4	April 26	Portland	W 89–88	Yao Ming (21)	Yao Ming (12)	Ron Artest (9)	Toyota Center; 18,271	3–1
5	April 28	@ Portland	L 77–88	Luis Scola (19)	Yao Ming (10)	Ron Artest (5)	Rose Garden Arena; 20,462	3–2
6	April 30	Portland	W 92–76	Ron Artest (27)	Yao Ming (10)	Kyle Lowry (3)	Toyota Center; 18,376	4–2

Conference Semifinals: 3–4 (home: 2–1; road: 1–3)

Game	Date	Team	Score	High points	High rebounds	High assists	Location Attendance	Series
1	May 4	@ L.A. Lakers	W 100–92	Yao Ming (28)	Yao Ming (10)	Ron Artest (7)	Staples Center; 18,997	1–0
2	May 6	@ L.A. Lakers	L 98–111	Ron Artest (25)	Yao, Landry (10)	Ron Artest (5)	Staples Center; 18,997	1–1
3	May 8	L.A. Lakers	L 94–108	Ron Artest (25)	Yao Ming (14)	Shane Battier (7)	Toyota Center; 18,495	1–2
4	May 10	L.A. Lakers	W 99–87	Aaron Brooks (34)	Luis Scola (14)	Ron Artest (6)	Toyota Center; 18,313	2–2
5	May 12	@ L.A. Lakers	L 78–118	Aaron Brooks (14)	Luis Scola (13)	Scola, Lowry (4)	Staples Center; 18,997	2–3
6	May 14	L.A. Lakers	W 95–80	Aaron Brooks (26)	Luis Scola (12)	three players tied (4)	Toyota Center; 18,501	3–3
7	May 17	@ L.A. Lakers	L 70–89	Aaron Brooks (13)	Ron Artest (8)	Ron Artest (5)	Staples Center; 18,997	3–4

2009 schedule

== Player statistics ==
Legend
GP	Games played	GS	Games started	MPG	Minutes per game
FG%	Field-goal percentage	3P%	3-point field-goal percentage	FT%	Free-throw percentage
RPG	Rebounds per game	APG	Assists per game	SPG	Steals per game
BPG	Blocks per game	PPG	Points per game

=== Regular season ===
Houston Rockets statistics
Player	GP	GS	MPG	FG%	3P%	FT%	RPG	APG	SPG	BPG	PPG
Luis Scola	82	82	30.3	.531	.000	.760	8.8	1.5	.8	.1	12.7
Aaron Brooks	80	35	25.0	.404	.366	.866	2.0	3.0	.6	.1	11.2
Yao Ming	77	77	33.6	.548	1.000	.866	9.9	1.8	.4	1.9	19.7
Chuck Hayes	71	1	12.1	.372	.000	.368	3.5	.6	.5	.3	1.3
Metta Sandiford-Artest	69	55	35.5	.401	.399	.748	5.2	3.3	1.5	.3	17.1
Carl Landry	69	0	21.3	.574	.333	.813	5.0	.6	.4	.4	9.2
Von Wafer	63	11	19.4	.447	.390	.752	1.8	1.1	.6	.1	9.7
Shane Battier	60	59	33.9	.410	.384	.821	4.8	2.3	.8	.9	7.3
Brent Barry	56	1	15.3	.407	.374	.950	1.7	1.4	.4	.1	3.7
Rafer Alston^{†}	48	48	33.1	.370	.348	.789	3.0	5.4	1.2	.1	11.5
Tracy McGrady	35	35	33.7	.388	.376	.801	4.4	5.0	1.2	.4	15.6
Kyle Lowry^{†}	28	0	21.7	.475	.276	.800	2.8	3.5	.8	.3	7.6
Luther Head^{†}	22	4	14.6	.386	.368	.875	1.2	1.6	.3	.0	4.8
Dikembe Mutombo	9	2	10.7	.385		.667	3.7	.0	.0	1.2	1.8
Brian Cook^{†}	9	0	2.8	.313	.400		.6	.1	.0	.3	1.3
James White	4	0	2.8	.600	.500		.0	.3	.3	.3	1.8
Joey Dorsey	3	0	2.0	.500			.3	.3	.0	.0	.7

=== Playoffs ===
Houston Rockets statistics
Player	GP	GS	MPG	FG%	3P%	FT%	RPG	APG	SPG	BPG	PPG
Shane Battier	13	13	38.2	.407	.315	.957	4.9	2.4	1.1	.7	8.1
Metta Sandiford-Artest	13	13	37.5	.394	.277	.714	4.3	4.2	1.1	.2	15.6
Aaron Brooks	13	13	34.2	.453	.422	.804	2.6	3.4	.4	.2	16.8
Luis Scola	13	13	32.6	.494		.673	8.4	1.8	.5	.2	14.4
Chuck Hayes	13	4	13.3	.476	.000		3.0	.8	1.0	.2	1.5
Kyle Lowry	13	0	19.5	.333	.250	.742	2.9	2.5	.9	.1	5.3
Carl Landry	13	0	18.5	.557	.000	.576	3.9	.2	.3	.4	7.5
Von Wafer	13	0	13.9	.424	.409	.864	.9	.7	.2	.1	8.2
Yao Ming	9	9	35.9	.545		.902	10.9	1.0	.4	1.2	17.1
Brian Cook	6	0	5.3	.267	.222		2.0	.5	.3	.2	1.7
James White	5	0	2.4	.333	.500		.2	.0	.0	.0	1.4
Brent Barry	4	0	8.8	.500	.375		1.0	.8	.5	.0	3.3
Dikembe Mutombo	2	0	10.0			.000	4.5	.0	.5	1.0	.0

- ^{†} Denotes player spent time with another team in the season. Stats reflect time with the Rockets only.

== Awards and records ==
=== Awards ===
- Dikembe Mutombo, J. Walter Kennedy Citizenship Award
- Yao Ming, All-NBA Second Team
- Shane Battier, NBA All-Defensive Second Team
- Ron Artest, NBA All-Defensive Second Team

== Transactions ==
=== Trades ===
June 26, 2008	To Houston Rockets The 28th pick in the 2008 NBA draft (Donté Greene) and The 33rd pick in the 2008 NBA draft (Joey Dorsey)	To Portland Trail Blazers The 25th pick in the 2008 NBA draft (Nicolas Batum)	To Memphis Grizzlies The 27th pick in the 2008 NBA draft (Darrell Arthur)

August 6, 2008	To Houston Rockets Option to exchange 2nd-round picks with Clippers in 2011	To Los Angeles Clippers Steve Novak
August 14, 2008	To Houston Rockets Ron Artest, Patrick Ewing Jr., Sean Singletary	To Sacramento Kings Bobby Jackson, Donté Greene, 1st-round pick for 2009
August 25, 2008	To Houston Rockets D. J. Strawberry	To Phoenix Suns Sean Singletary
August 29, 2008	To Houston Rockets Draft rights to Frédéric Weis	To New York Knicks Patrick Ewing Jr.
December 24, 2008	To Houston Rockets Conditional Draft Pick in 2011	To Memphis Grizzlies Steve Francis, 2009 NBA Draft Pick
December 24, 2008	To Houston Rockets Kyle Lowry, Brian Cook	To Memphis Grizzlies Adonal Foyle, Mike Wilks, NBA 1st Round Pick	To Orlando Magic Rafer Alston,

=== Free agents ===
==== Additions ====
Player	Signed	Former team
Brent Barry	July 10	San Antonio Spurs

==== Subtractions ====
Player	Left	New team
Loren Woods	July 16	Žalgiris Kaunas
