= 2008–09 Atlanta Hawks season =

Season of National Basketball Association team the Atlanta Hawks

- Head coach: Mike Woodson
- Owners: Atlanta Spirit LLC
- Arena: Philips Arena

Results
- Record: 47–35 (.573)
- Place: Division: 2nd (Southeast); Conference: 4th (Eastern)
- Playoff finish: Conference Semifinals (lost to Cavaliers 0–4)
- Stats at Basketball Reference

Local media
- Television: Fox Sports South; SportSouth
- Radio: WQXI

The 2008–09 Atlanta Hawks season was the team's 60th season of the franchise in the National Basketball Association (NBA) and the 41st in Atlanta. It ended on Monday, May 11, 2009, with a loss at home to the Cleveland Cavaliers in the second round of the playoffs in a sweep. They also clinched their first winning season since 1998-99.

== Key dates ==
- June 26: The 2008 NBA draft took place in New York City.
- July 1: The free agency period started.

== Draft picks ==
The Hawks did not have any draft picks in the 2008 NBA draft.

== Roster ==
2008–09 Atlanta Hawks roster
Players

| Pos. | No. | Player | Height | Weight | DOB | From |
|---|---|---|---|---|---|---|
| G | 10 | Mike Bibby | 6 ft 1 in (1.85 m) | 190 lb (86 kg) | | Arizona |
| G | 12 | Speedy Claxton | 5 ft 11 in (1.80 m) | 166 lb (75 kg) | | Hofstra |
| G/F | 1 | Maurice Evans | 6 ft 5 in (1.96 m) | 220 lb (100 kg) | | Texas |
| G | 3 | Thomas Gardner | 6 ft 5 in (1.96 m) | 225 lb (102 kg) | | Missouri |
| F/C | 15 | Al Horford | 6 ft 10 in (2.08 m) | 250 lb (113 kg) | | Florida |
| F | 50 | Othello Hunter | 6 ft 8 in (2.03 m) | 225 lb (102 kg) | | Ohio State |
| G/F | 2 | Joe Johnson | 6 ft 7 in (2.01 m) | 240 lb (109 kg) | | Arkansas |
| F/C | 44 | Solomon Jones | 6 ft 10 in (2.08 m) | 230 lb (104 kg) | | South Florida |
| G | 4 | Acie Law | 6 ft 3 in (1.91 m) | 195 lb (88 kg) | | Texas A&M |
| F/C | 33 | Randolph Morris | 6 ft 10 in (2.08 m) | 266 lb (121 kg) | | Kentucky |
| G | 22 | Flip Murray | 6 ft 4 in (1.93 m) | 190 lb (86 kg) | | Shaw |
| C | 27 | Zaza Pachulia | 6 ft 11 in (2.11 m) | 240 lb (109 kg) | | Republic of Georgia |
| F | 5 | Josh Smith | 6 ft 9 in (2.06 m) | 225 lb (102 kg) | | Oak Hill Academy HS (VA) |
| G | 6 | Mario West | 6 ft 5 in (1.96 m) | 210 lb (95 kg) | | Georgia Tech |
| F | 24 | Marvin Williams | 6 ft 9 in (2.06 m) | 230 lb (104 kg) | | North Carolina |

Coaches
Head coach
- Mike Woodson
Assistant(s)
- Bob Bender
- Larry Drew
- Tyrone Hill
- Jim Todd

Legend
- (DP) Unsigned draft pick
- (FA) Free agent
- (S) Suspended
- Injured

=== Roster Notes ===
- Othello Hunter was born and raised in the U.S., but is also a Liberian citizen.

== Regular season ==
=== Standings ===
| Southeast Division | W | L | PCT | GB | Home | Road | Div | GP |
|---|---|---|---|---|---|---|---|---|
| y-Orlando Magic | 59 | 23 | .720 | — | 32–9 | 27–14 | 14–2 | 82 |
| x-Atlanta Hawks | 47 | 35 | .573 | 12 | 31–10 | 16–25 | 11–5 | 82 |
| x-Miami Heat | 43 | 39 | .524 | 16 | 28–13 | 15–26 | 9–7 | 82 |
| Charlotte Bobcats | 35 | 47 | .427 | 24 | 23–18 | 12–29 | 5–11 | 82 |
| Washington Wizards | 19 | 63 | .232 | 40 | 13–28 | 6–35 | 1–15 | 82 |

| # | Eastern Conference | | | | |
| # | Team | W | L | PCT | GB |
|---|---|---|---|---|---|
| 1 | z-Cleveland Cavaliers | 66 | 16 | .805 | — |
| 2 | y-Boston Celtics | 62 | 20 | .756 | 4 |
| 3 | y-Orlando Magic | 59 | 23 | .720 | 7 |
| 4 | x-Atlanta Hawks | 47 | 35 | .573 | 19 |
| 5 | x-Miami Heat | 43 | 39 | .524 | 23 |
| 6 | x-Philadelphia 76ers | 41 | 41 | .500 | 25 |
| 7 | x-Chicago Bulls | 41 | 41 | .500 | 25 |
| 8 | x-Detroit Pistons | 39 | 43 | .476 | 27 |
| 9 | Indiana Pacers | 36 | 46 | .439 | 30 |
| 10 | Charlotte Bobcats | 35 | 47 | .427 | 31 |
| 11 | New Jersey Nets | 34 | 48 | .415 | 32 |
| 12 | Milwaukee Bucks | 34 | 48 | .415 | 32 |
| 13 | Toronto Raptors | 33 | 49 | .402 | 33 |
| 14 | New York Knicks | 32 | 50 | .390 | 34 |
| 15 | Washington Wizards | 19 | 63 | .232 | 47 |

=== Game log ===
2008–09 game log
October: 1–0 (home: 0–0; road: 1–0)

| Game | Date | Team | Score | High points | High rebounds | High assists | Location Attendance | Record |
|---|---|---|---|---|---|---|---|---|
| 1 | October 29 | @ Orlando | W 99–85 | Joe Johnson (25) | Josh Smith (10) | Mike Bibby, Al Horford (4) | Amway Arena; 17,461 | 1–0 |

November: 9–6 (home: 5–1; road: 4–5)

| Game | Date | Team | Score | High points | High rebounds | High assists | Location Attendance | Record |
|---|---|---|---|---|---|---|---|---|
| 2 | November 1 | Philadelphia | W 95–88 | Joe Johnson (35) | Josh Smith (11) | Joe Johnson (5) | Philips Arena; 19,651 | 2–0 |
| 3 | November 5 | @ New Orleans | W 87–79 | Joe Johnson (24) | Josh Smith (11) | Joe Johnson, Al Horford, Mike Bibby (4) | New Orleans Arena; 16,030 | 3–0 |
| 4 | November 7 | Toronto | W 110–92 | Mike Bibby (19) | Solomon Jones (9) | Mike Bibby (12) | Philips Arena; 18,290 | 4–0 |
| 5 | November 9 | @ Oklahoma City | W 89–85 | Joe Johnson (25) | Al Horford (12) | Mike Bibby (4) | Ford Center; 18,231 | 5–0 |
| 6 | November 11 | @ Chicago | W 113–108 | Al Horford (27) | Al Horford (17) | Joe Johnson (8) | United Center; 21,738 | 6–0 |
| 7 | November 12 | @ Boston | L 102–103 | Joe Johnson (28) | Maurice Evans, Zaza Pachulia, Solomon Jones (5) | Joe Johnson (7) | TD Banknorth Garden; 18,624 | 6–1 |
| 8 | November 14 | @ New Jersey | L 108–115 | Joe Johnson (32) | Al Horford (11) | Joe Johnson (5) | Izod Center; 15,309 | 6–2 |
| 9 | November 15 | New Jersey | L 107–119 | Joe Johnson (31) | Marvin Williams, Al Horford, Solomon Jones (6) | Mike Bibby (7) | Philips Arena; 18,729 | 6–3 |
| 10 | November 18 | @ Indiana | L 96–113 | Joe Johnson (25) | Zaza Pachulia (8) | Mike Bibby (5) | Conseco Fieldhouse; 13,379 | 6–4 |
| 11 | November 19 | Washington | W 91–87 | Mike Bibby (25) | Zaza Pachulia (18) | Joe Johnson (8) | Philips Arena; 14,416 | 7–4 |
| 12 | November 21 | Charlotte | W 88–83 | Joe Johnson (30) | Marvin Williams, Maurice Evans (10) | Joe Johnson (8) | Philips Arena; 15,068 | 8–4 |
| 13 | November 22 | @ Cleveland | L 96–110 | Maurice Evans (21) | Al Horford (9) | Acie Law (7) | Quicken Loans Arena; 20,562 | 8–5 |
| 14 | November 26 | Milwaukee | W 102–96 | Al Horford (21) | Al Horford (9) | Joe Johnson (9) | Philips Arena; 15,730 | 9–5 |
| 15 | November 28 | @ Toronto | L 88–93 | Mike Bibby (24) | Zaza Pachulia (17) | Joe Johnson (7) | Air Canada Centre; 19,200 | 9–6 |
| 16 | November 29 | @ Washington | W 102–98 | Mike Bibby (21) | Al Horford (13) | Mike Bibby, Al Horford (6) | Verizon Center; 18,110 | 10–6 |

December: 11–4 (home: 9–1; road: 2–3)

| Game | Date | Team | Score | High points | High rebounds | High assists | Location Attendance | Record |
|---|---|---|---|---|---|---|---|---|
| 17 | December 3 | Memphis | W 105–95 | Joe Johnson (26) | Zaza Pachulia, Josh Smith (6) | Mike Bibby (10) | Philips Arena; 12,088 | 11–6 |
| 18 | December 5 | New York | W 98–95 | Marvin Williams (18) | Al Horford (9) | Mike Bibby (9) | Philips Arena; 16,366 | 12–6 |
| 19 | December 6 | @ Dallas | L 98–100 | Joe Johnson (32) | Zaza Pachulia (12) | Mike Bibby (5) | American Airlines Center; 19,966 | 12–7 |
| 20 | December 9 | @ Houston | L 84–92 | Joe Johnson (22) | Josh Smith (11) | Josh Smith, Joe Johnson (4) | Toyota Center; 16,439 | 12–8 |
| 21 | December 10 | @ San Antonio | L 89–95 | Joe Johnson (29) | Al Horford (7) | Mike Bibby (7) | AT&T Center; 18,161 | 12–9 |
| 22 | December 12 | @ Miami | W 87–73 | Joe Johnson (21) | Al Horford (10) | Mike Bibby (8) | American Airlines Arena; 19,600 | 13–9 |
| 23 | December 13 | Cleveland | W 97–92 | Mike Bibby (24) | Al Horford, Josh Smith (8) | Joe Johnson (8) | Philips Arena; 19,200 | 14–9 |
| 24 | December 15 | Charlotte | W 83–79 | Joe Johnson (28) | Al Horford (14) | Joe Johnson (8) | Philips Arena; 12,733 | 15–9 |
| 25 | December 17 | Boston | L 85–88 | Joe Johnson (20) | Al Horford (11) | Joe Johnson, Josh Smith, Al Horford (4) | Philips Arena; 18,729 | 15–10 |
| 26 | December 19 | Golden State | W 115–99 | Marvin Williams (22) | Marvin Williams (9) | Josh Smith, Mike Bibby (7) | Philips Arena; 16,768 | 16–10 |
| 27 | December 21 | Detroit | W 85–78 | Mike Bibby (27) | Al Horford (11) | Joe Johnson (7) | Philips Arena; 15,233 | 17–10 |
| 28 | December 23 | Oklahoma City | W 99–88 | Marvin Williams (21) | Joe Johnson (11) | Joe Johnson (11) | Philips Arena; 12,138 | 18–10 |
| 29 | December 27 | Chicago | W 129–117 | Joe Johnson (41) | Al Horford (10) | Joe Johnson (8) | Philips Arena; 18,031 | 19–10 |
| 30 | December 29 | Denver | W 109–91 | Joe Johnson (25) | Al Horford (10) | Mike Bibby (9) | Philips Arena; 17,131 | 20–10 |
| 31 | December 30 | @ Indiana | W 110–104 | Joe Johnson (27) | Al Horford (14) | Mike Bibby (6) | Conseco Fieldhouse; 13,762 | 21–10 |

January: 6–10 (home: 4–3; road: 2–7)

| Game | Date | Team | Score | High points | High rebounds | High assists | Location Attendance | Record |
|---|---|---|---|---|---|---|---|---|
| 32 | January 2 | @ New Jersey | L 91–93 (OT) | Mike Bibby (22) | Joe Johnson (9) | Joe Johnson (9) | Izod Center; 16,851 | 21–11 |
| 33 | January 3 | Houston | W 103–100 | Josh Smith (29) | Al Horford (6) | Joe Johnson (14) | Philips Arena; 16,740 | 22–11 |
| 34 | January 7 | Orlando | L 102–106 | Josh Smith (21) | Al Horford (13) | Mike Bibby, Joe Johnson (9) | Philips Arena; 13,748 | 22–12 |
| 35 | January 9 | @ Orlando | L 87–121 | Acie Law (16) | Solomon Jones (8) | Joe Johnson (4) | Amway Arena; 17,461 | 22–13 |
| 36 | January 11 | Philadelphia | L 94–109 | Joe Johnson (25) | Zaza Pachulia (6) | Joe Johnson (9) | Philips Arena; 15,079 | 22–14 |
| 37 | January 13 | @ Phoenix | L 102–107 | Josh Smith (24) | Marvin Williams (12) | Joe Johnson, Mike Bibby (3) | US Airways Center; 18,422 | 22–15 |
| 38 | January 14 | @ L.A. Clippers | W 97–80 | Josh Smith (26) | Josh Smith (8) | Joe Johnson (7) | Staples Center; 15,901 | 23–15 |
| 39 | January 16 | @ Golden State | L 114–119 | Joe Johnson (25) | Zaza Pachulia (8) | Mike Bibby (7) | Oracle Arena; 18,832 | 23–16 |
| 40 | January 19 | Toronto | W 87–84 | Joe Johnson (28) | Josh Smith (14) | Mike Bibby (5) | Philips Arena; 17,199 | 24–16 |
| 41 | January 20 | @ Chicago | W 105–102 | Mike Bibby (31) | Josh Smith (14) | Joe Johnson (8) | United Center; 20,389 | 25–16 |
| 42 | January 23 | Milwaukee | W 117–87 | Ronald Murray (25) | Marvin Williams (9) | Mike Bibby (15) | Philips Arena; 18,556 | 26–16 |
| 43 | January 25 | Phoenix | L 99–104 | Josh Smith (19) | Josh Smith (12) | Joe Johnson (13) | Philips Arena; 19,153 | 26–17 |
| 44 | January 26 | @ Miami | L 79–95 | Joe Johnson (19) | Josh Smith (10) | Joe Johnson (4) | American Airlines Arena; 18,103 | 26–18 |
| 45 | January 28 | @ New York | L 104–112 | Marvin Williams (28) | Josh Smith (12) | Joe Johnson, Mike Bibby (7) | Madison Square Garden; 18,180 | 26–19 |
| 46 | January 30 | New Jersey | W 105–88 | Joe Johnson (29) | Marvin Williams (11) | Josh Smith (6) | Philips Arena; 17,561 | 27–19 |
| 47 | January 31 | @ Milwaukee | L 107–110 | Mike Bibby (24) | Josh Smith (11) | Joe Johnson (9) | Bradley Center; 15,881 | 27–20 |

February: 6–5 (home: 2–1; road: 4–4)

| Game | Date | Team | Score | High points | High rebounds | High assists | Location Attendance | Record |
|---|---|---|---|---|---|---|---|---|
| 48 | February 4 | @ Minnesota | W 94–86 | Mike Bibby (24) | Marvin Williams (10) | Mike Bibby (7) | Target Center; 13,745 | 28–20 |
| 49 | February 6 | @ Charlotte | W 102–97 | Marvin Williams (29) | Zaza Pachulia (8) | Mike Bibby, Al Horford (4) | Time Warner Cable Arena; 15,140 | 29–20 |
| 50 | February 7 | L.A. Clippers | L 97–121 | Joe Johnson, Marvin Williams (17) | Josh Smith (15) | Acie Law (6) | Philips Arena; 18,729 | 29–21 |
| 51 | February 10 | Washington | W 111–90 | Joe Johnson (22) | Zaza Pachulia (12) | Joe Johnson (8) | Philips Arena; 17,027 | 30–21 |
| 52 | February 11 | @ Detroit | W 99–95 | Joe Johnson (27) | Marvin Williams (8) | Josh Smith (7) | The Palace of Auburn Hills; 20,124 | 31–21 |
| 53 | February 17 | @ L.A. Lakers | L 83–96 | Joe Johnson (14) | Zaza Pachulia (12) | Joe Johnson (5) | Staples Center; 18,997 | 31–22 |
| 54 | February 18 | @ Sacramento | W 105–100 | Mike Bibby (29) | Al Horford (18) | Joe Johnson (6) | ARCO Arena; 11,213 | 32–22 |
| 55 | February 20 | @ Portland | L 98–108 | Mike Bibby (27) | Joe Johnson (8) | Joe Johnson (7) | Rose Garden; 20,250 | 32–23 |
| 56 | February 23 | @ Utah | L 89–108 | Joe Johnson (15) | Al Horford, Zaza Pachulia, Marvin Williams (6) | Ronald Murray, Al Horford (5) | EnergySolutions Arena; 19,911 | 32–24 |
| 57 | February 25 | @ Denver | L 109–110 | Marvin Williams (31) | Al Horford (11) | Joe Johnson (8) | Pepsi Center; 18,418 | 32–25 |
| 58 | February 27 | Miami | W 91–83 | Joe Johnson (24) | Al Horford (22) | Joe Johnson (5) | Philips Arena; 19,157 | 33–25 |

March: 10–7 (home: 9–3; road: 1–4)

| Game | Date | Team | Score | High points | High rebounds | High assists | Location Attendance | Record |
|---|---|---|---|---|---|---|---|---|
| 59 | March 1 | Cleveland | L 87–88 | Joe Johnson (21) | Marvin Williams, Al Horford (10) | Joe Johnson (4) | Philips Arena; 19,639 | 33–26 |
| 60 | March 2 | @ Washington | W 98–89 | Marvin Williams (28) | Al Horford (8) | Joe Johnson (13) | Verizon Center; 10,189 | 34–26 |
| 61 | March 4 | @ New York | L 105–109 | Al Horford (20) | Al Horford (13) | Joe Johnson (6) | Madison Square Garden; 18,931 | 34–27 |
| 62 | March 6 | @ Charlotte | L 91–98 | Al Horford (15) | Marvin Williams (8) | Mike Bibby (6) | Time Warner Cable Arena; 15,058 | 34–28 |
| 63 | March 7 | Detroit | W 87–83 | Josh Smith (19) | Josh Smith, Al Horford (12) | Joe Johnson (6) | Philips Arena; 19,101 | 35–28 |
| 64 | March 9 | New Orleans | W 89–79 | Joe Johnson (30) | Josh Smith (13) | Mike Bibby, Josh Smith, Acie Law (3) | Philips Arena; 14,204 | 36–28 |
| 65 | March 11 | Utah | W 100–93 | Joe Johnson (31) | Al Horford, Josh Smith (12) | Joe Johnson (9) | Philips Arena; 13,112 | 37–28 |
| 66 | March 13 | Indiana | W 101–87 | Joe Johnson (30) | Al Horford (15) | Joe Johnson, Mike Bibby (6) | Philips Arena; 14,079 | 38–28 |
| 67 | March 15 | Portland | W 98–80 | Joe Johnson (35) | Josh Smith (8) | Joe Johnson (6) | Philips Arena; 14,413 | 39–28 |
| 68 | March 17 | Sacramento | W 119–97 | Al Horford (23) | Al Horford (12) | Mike Bibby (7) | Philips Arena; 14,226 | 40–28 |
| 69 | March 19 | Dallas | W 95–87 | Joe Johnson (24) | Josh Smith (9) | Mike Bibby (7) | Philips Arena; 17,499 | 41–28 |
| 70 | March 21 | @ Cleveland | L 96–102 | Joe Johnson (24) | Al Horford (11) | Al Horford (6) | Quicken Loans Arena; 20,562 | 41–29 |
| 71 | March 23 | Minnesota | W 109–97 | Ronald Murray (30) | Al Horford (13) | Mike Bibby (9) | Philips Arena; 13,425 | 42–29 |
| 72 | March 25 | San Antonio | L 92–102 | Joe Johnson (30) | Al Horford (13) | Josh Smith (5) | Philips Arena; 18,529 | 42–30 |
| 73 | March 27 | Boston | L 93–99 | Joe Johnson, Josh Smith (22) | Al Horford (14) | Joe Johnson, Josh Smith (4) | Philips Arena; 20,054 | 42–31 |
| 74 | March 29 | L.A. Lakers | W 86–76 | Mike Bibby (21) | Zaza Pachulia (13) | Joe Johnson (8) | Philips Arena; 20,148 | 43–31 |
| 75 | March 31 | @ Philadelphia | L 85–98 | Josh Smith (33) | Zaza Pachulia, Al Horford (8) | Joe Johnson (7) | Wachovia Center; 18,256 | 43–32 |

April: 4–3 (home: 2–1; road: 2–2)

| Game | Date | Team | Score | High points | High rebounds | High assists | Location Attendance | Record |
|---|---|---|---|---|---|---|---|---|
| 76 | April 3 | @ Boston | L 92–104 | Ronald Murray (21) | Josh Smith (10) | Mike Bibby (6) | TD Banknorth Garden; 18,624 | 43–33 |
| 77 | April 4 | Orlando | L 82–88 | Joe Johnson (21) | Al Horford (13) | Mike Bibby (5) | Philips Arena; 19,608 | 43–34 |
| 78 | April 7 | @ Toronto | W 118–110 | Joe Johnson, Josh Smith (25) | Al Horford (12) | Mike Bibby (10) | Air Canada Centre; 17,613 | 44–34 |
| 79 | April 8 | @ Milwaukee | W 113–105 | Joe Johnson (30) | Al Horford (9) | Mike Bibby (8) | Bradley Center; 13,073 | 45–34 |
| 80 | April 10 | Indiana | W 122–118 | Josh Smith (30) | Al Horford (15) | Mike Bibby (9) | Philips Arena; 17,222 | 46–34 |
| 81 | April 14 | Miami | W 81–79 | Ronald Murray (17) | Mario West (9) | Ronald Murray (5) | Philips Arena; 18,179 | 47–34 |
| 82 | April 15 | @ Memphis | L 90–98 | Ronald Murray (29) | Zaza Pachulia, Othello Hunter (9) | Ronald Murray (6) | FedExForum; 12,736 | 47–35 |

2008–09 schedule

== Playoffs ==
2009 playoff game log
First Round: 4–3 (home: 3–1; road: 1–2)

| Game | Date | Team | Score | High points | High rebounds | High assists | Location Attendance | Series |
|---|---|---|---|---|---|---|---|---|
| 1 | April 19 | Miami | W 90–64 | Josh Smith (23) | Smith, Pachulia (10) | Mike Bibby (9) | Philips Arena; 18,851 | 1–0 |
| 2 | April 22 | Miami | L 93–108 | Mike Bibby (18) | Al Horford (11) | Al Horford (5) | Philips Arena; 19,146 | 1–1 |
| 3 | April 25 | @ Miami | L 78–107 | three players tied (13) | Josh Smith (8) | three players tied (3) | American Airlines Arena; 19,600 | 1–2 |
| 4 | April 27 | @ Miami | W 81–71 | Mike Bibby (15) | Zaza Pachulia (18) | Joe Johnson (5) | American Airlines Arena; 19,600 | 2–2 |
| 5 | April 29 | Miami | W 106–91 | Joe Johnson (25) | Josh Smith (8) | Joe Johnson (6) | Philips Arena; 19,051 | 3–2 |
| 6 | May 1 | @ Miami | L 72–98 | Mike Bibby (20) | Josh Smith (10) | Mike Bibby (3) | American Airlines Arena; 19,600 | 3–3 |
| 7 | May 3 | Miami | W 91–78 | Joe Johnson (27) | Josh Smith (9) | Mike Bibby (6) | Philips Arena; 18,864 | 4–3 |

Conference Semifinals: 0–4 (home: 0–2; road: 0–2)

| Game | Date | Team | Score | High points | High rebounds | High assists | Location Attendance | Series |
|---|---|---|---|---|---|---|---|---|
| 1 | May 5 | @ Cleveland | L 72–99 | Josh Smith (22) | Al Horford (8) | Mike Bibby (8) | Quicken Loans Arena; 20,562 | 0–1 |
| 2 | May 7 | @ Cleveland | L 85–105 | Maurice Evans (16) | Zaza Pachulia (12) | Maurice Evans (4) | Quicken Loans Arena; 20,562 | 0–2 |
| 3 | May 9 | Cleveland | L 82–97 | Joe Johnson (17) | Smith, Johnson (5) | Mike Bibby (5) | Philips Arena; 20,143 | 0–3 |
| 4 | May 11 | Cleveland | L 74–84 | Josh Smith (26) | Josh Smith (8) | Joe Johnson (7) | Philips Arena; 19,241 | 0–4 |

2009 schedule

== Player statistics ==
Legend
| GP | Games played | GS | Games started | MPG | Minutes per game |
| FG% | Field-goal percentage | 3P% | 3-point field-goal percentage | FT% | Free-throw percentage |
| RPG | Rebounds per game | APG | Assists per game | SPG | Steals per game |
| BPG | Blocks per game | PPG | Points per game |

=== Regular season ===
| Player | GP | GS | MPG | FG% | 3P% | FT% | RPG | APG | SPG | BPG | PPG |
|---|---|---|---|---|---|---|---|---|---|---|---|
| Maurice Evans | 80 | 25 | 23.0 | .432 | .395 | .822 | 3.0 | .7 | .6 | .1 | 7.2 |
| Ronald Murray | 80 | 2 | 24.7 | .447 | .360 | .760 | 2.1 | 2.0 | 1.1 | .2 | 12.2 |
| Joe Johnson | 79 | 79 | 39.5 | .437 | .360 | .826 | 4.4 | 5.8 | 1.1 | .2 | 21.4 |
| Mike Bibby | 79 | 79 | 34.7 | .435 | .390 | .789 | 3.5 | 5.0 | 1.2 | .1 | 14.9 |
| Zaza Pachulia | 77 | 26 | 19.1 | .497 | .000 | .709 | 5.7 | .7 | .5 | .3 | 6.2 |
| Josh Smith | 69 | 69 | 35.1 | .492 | .299 | .588 | 7.2 | 2.4 | 1.4 | 1.6 | 15.6 |
| Al Horford | 67 | 67 | 33.5 | .525 | .000 | .727 | 9.3 | 2.4 | .8 | 1.4 | 11.5 |
| Solomon Jones | 63 | 0 | 10.7 | .604 | .500 | .716 | 2.3 | .2 | .1 | .5 | 3.0 |
| Marvin Williams | 61 | 59 | 34.3 | .458 | .355 | .806 | 6.3 | 1.3 | .9 | .6 | 13.9 |
| Acie Law | 55 | 1 | 10.2 | .374 | .310 | .817 | 1.1 | 1.6 | .2 | .1 | 2.9 |
| Mario West | 53 | 3 | 5.1 | .412 | 1.000 | .467 | 1.1 | .4 | .3 | .1 | .8 |
| Randolph Morris | 23 | 0 | 3.9 | .412 | | 1.000 | .9 | .1 | .1 | .0 | .8 |
| Thomas Gardner | 16 | 0 | 6.1 | .250 | .174 | .500 | .4 | .1 | .3 | .1 | 1.5 |
| Othello Hunter | 16 | 0 | 5.8 | .550 | | .000 | 1.5 | .1 | .1 | .3 | 1.4 |
| Speedy Claxton | 2 | 0 | 7.5 | .286 | | .500 | .0 | 1.5 | .0 | .0 | 2.5 |

=== Playoffs ===
| Player | GP | GS | MPG | FG% | 3P% | FT% | RPG | APG | SPG | BPG | PPG |
|---|---|---|---|---|---|---|---|---|---|---|---|
| Joe Johnson | 11 | 11 | 39.0 | .417 | .343 | .622 | 4.5 | 3.5 | 1.3 | .0 | 16.4 |
| Josh Smith | 11 | 11 | 37.3 | .421 | .133 | .732 | 7.5 | 2.2 | 1.1 | 1.5 | 17.1 |
| Mike Bibby | 11 | 11 | 35.5 | .462 | .542 | .955 | 3.4 | 4.2 | .9 | .2 | 13.2 |
| Maurice Evans | 11 | 8 | 24.1 | .431 | .286 | .667 | 1.5 | .9 | .5 | .3 | 6.2 |
| Zaza Pachulia | 11 | 1 | 23.6 | .415 | | .762 | 6.9 | .3 | .5 | .3 | 6.9 |
| Ronald Murray | 11 | 0 | 31.0 | .341 | .280 | .865 | 2.7 | 2.5 | 1.1 | .3 | 11.8 |
| Mario West | 11 | 0 | 4.2 | .200 | .000 | .250 | .5 | .2 | .2 | .0 | .5 |
| Al Horford | 9 | 9 | 28.0 | .424 | .000 | .667 | 5.8 | 2.0 | .7 | .7 | 6.9 |
| Solomon Jones | 9 | 1 | 8.6 | .500 | | 1.000 | 1.8 | .2 | .1 | .0 | 1.6 |
| Marvin Williams | 6 | 3 | 16.2 | .345 | .167 | .692 | 1.5 | 1.0 | .8 | .3 | 5.0 |
| Acie Law | 6 | 0 | 4.7 | .333 | .333 | 1.000 | .3 | 1.0 | .0 | .0 | 1.3 |
| Othello Hunter | 4 | 0 | 3.5 | .667 | | | 1.5 | .0 | .3 | .3 | 1.0 |
| Thomas Gardner | 3 | 0 | 6.3 | .385 | .500 | 1.000 | .7 | .7 | .3 | .0 | 4.7 |
| Randolph Morris | 3 | 0 | 2.7 | .000 | | | .7 | .0 | .3 | .0 | .0 |
| Speedy Claxton | 1 | 0 | 3.0 | | | | .0 | .0 | .0 | .0 | .0 |

- ^{†} Denotes player spent time with another team in the season. Stats reflect time with the Hawks only.

== Transactions ==
=== Free agents ===
- On August 11, it was announced that Hawks forward Josh Smith will remain with the Hawks after the Hawks matched an offer sheet from the Memphis Grizzlies. The terms have not been disclosed but it's believed that Smith gets a five-year deal worth about $58 million.

==== Additions ====
| Player | Signed | Former team |
|---|---|---|
| Flip Murray | August 14 | Pacers |

==== Subtractions ====
| Player | Left | New team |
|---|---|---|
| Josh Childress | | Greek club Olympiakos |
