= Ronald Murray =

American basketball player (born 1979)

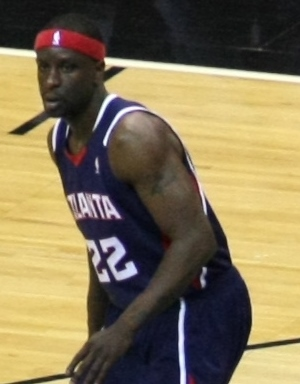
- Murray in 2008 with the Atlanta Hawks

Personal information
- Born: July 29, 1979 (age 46) Philadelphia, Pennsylvania, U.S.
- Listed height: 6 ft 3 in (1.91 m)
- Listed weight: 200 lb (91 kg)

Career information
- High school: Strawberry Mansion (Philadelphia, Pennsylvania)
- College: Meridian CC (1997–1999); Shaw (2000–2002)
- NBA draft: 2002: 2nd round, 42nd overall pick
- Drafted by: Milwaukee Bucks
- Playing career: 2002–2014
- Position: Point guard / shooting guard
- Number: 15, 22, 2, 6

Career history
- 2002–2003: Milwaukee Bucks
- 2003–2006: Seattle SuperSonics
- 2006: Cleveland Cavaliers
- 2006–2008: Detroit Pistons
- 2008: Indiana Pacers
- 2008–2009: Atlanta Hawks
- 2009–2010: Charlotte Bobcats
- 2010: Chicago Bulls
- 2011: Efes Pilsen
- 2012: Austin Toros
- 2013: Azovmash Mariupol
- 2013: Austin Toros
- 2014: Al Mouttahed Tripoli

Career highlights
- NBA D-League champion (2012); NABC Division II Player of the Year (2002)
- Stats at NBA.com
- Stats at Basketball Reference

Ronald "Flip" Murray (born July 29, 1979) is an American former professional basketball player. At 6 ft 3 in (1.91 m), 200 lb (91 kg; 14 st), Murray played as a point guard–shooting guard. After attending Strawberry Mansion High School in Philadelphia, where he starred on the basketball team, he played college basketball for four seasons, first at the Meridian Community College in Meridian, Mississippi, from 1997 to 1999, and then at Shaw University located in Raleigh, North Carolina, from 2000 to 2002. He is nicknamed "Flip" by childhood friends who often said he looked like Bernie Mac's character, "Flip", from the movie Above The Rim.

== Career ==
Murray was drafted by the Milwaukee Bucks with pick number 42 in the second round of the 2002 NBA draft, after being NCAA's Division II Player of the Year during his senior season at Shaw, as he led the Shaw University Bears to the Division II Final Four in basketball. In his first few NBA seasons he played for the Bucks and for the SuperSonics in Seattle, where he developed as a scoring threat in 2003–04, substituting for Ray Allen who missed 26 games due to injury, averaging 12 points in 25 minutes, while appearing in all 82 matches. Selected to play in the 2004 Rookie Challenge. Representing the SuperSonics, Murray scored 25 points and dished out 10 assists for the sophomores.

On February 23, 2006, he was traded by Seattle to the Cleveland Cavaliers in exchange for Mike Wilks and cash considerations. In his brief stint with the Cavs, Murray averaged his career-highs in nearly every category.

On July 18, 2006, Murray signed with the Detroit Pistons for $3.6 million over two years, in an effort by the team to improve its bench depth. In the 2006–07 season, Murray started eighteen games (twelve in place of point guard Chauncey Billups and six in place of shooting guard Richard Hamilton).

On February 22, 2008, Murray was waived by the Pistons. On March 1, he was signed by the Indiana Pacers. There was an expectation the Los Angeles Clippers would sign Murray, but he elected to go with the Pacers instead.

On August 13, 2008, Murray signed with the Atlanta Hawks.

On September 25, 2009, the Charlotte Bobcats signed Murray reportedly to a one-year $1.99 million contract.

On February 18, 2010, Murray was traded in a packaged deal to the Chicago Bulls for Tyrus Thomas. Murray's final NBA game was played in Game 5 of the 2010 Eastern Conference First Round against the Cleveland Cavaliers on April 27, 2010. The Bulls would lose Game 5 to the Cavs 94–96, with Murray recording 6 points and 3 rebounds. Chicago dropped the series to Cleveland 4–1.

On January 13, 2011, he signed with the Turkish team Efes Pilsen S.K. until the end of the 2010–11 season.

In October 2012, he signed with the Memphis Grizzlies, but he did not make the team's regular season roster.

In January 2013, he signed with the Ukrainian team Azovmash Mariupol.

On October 31, 2013, he was reacquired by the Austin Toros of the NBA Development League. On April 11, 2014, he signed with Al Mouttahed Tripoli of Lebanon for the rest of the 2013–14 season.

== NBA career statistics ==
Legend
GP	Games played	GS	Games started	MPG	Minutes per game
FG%	Field goal percentage	3P%	3-point field goal percentage	FT%	Free throw percentage
RPG	Rebounds per game	APG	Assists per game	SPG	Steals per game
BPG	Blocks per game	PPG	Points per game	**Bold**	Career high

=== Regular season ===
Year	Team	GP	GS	MPG	FG%	3P%	FT%	RPG	APG	SPG	BPG	PPG
2002–03	Milwaukee	12	0	34.1	16.2	.000	345	.1	.3	.3	.0	1.9
2002–03	Seattle	2	0	10.0	.400	.000	.000	1.5	1.0	.0	.0	2.0
2003–04	Seattle	**82**	18	24.6	.425	.293	.715	**2.5**	2.5	1.0	**.3**	12.4
2004–05	Seattle	49	6	18.0	.361	.253	.738	2.0	1.3	.6	.2	7.0
2005–06	Seattle	48	2	22.6	.397	.224	.717	1.8	2.5	.6	.1	9.9
2005–06	Cleveland	28	**25**	**36.7**	**.448**	.308	.702	2.4	2.8	**1.4**	**.3**	**13.5**
2006–07	Detroit	69	18	21.4	.404	.289	.725	1.6	2.7	.7	.2	6.7
2007–08	Detroit	19	2	18.3	.410	.222	.595	1.9	3.4	.7	.1	7.5
2007–08	Indiana	23	17	22.9	.425	**.389**	.754	2.0	**3.5**	1.1	.1	11.0
2008–09	Atlanta	80	2	24.7	.447	.360	.760	2.1	2.0	1.1	.2	12.2
2009–10	Charlotte	46	1	21.6	.389	.313	.710	2.1	1.8	.6	**.3**	9.9
2009–10	Chicago	29	1	23.4	.397	.311	**.762**	2.9	1.8	.6	.1	10.1
Career		487	92	22.7	.414	.304	.725	2.1	2.3	.8	.2	9.9

=== Playoffs ===
Year	Team	GP	GS	MPG	FG%	3P%	FT%	RPG	APG	SPG	BPG	PPG
2005	Seattle	4	0	15.5	.211	.000	.571	1.5	1.3	.0	**.5**	3.0
2006	Cleveland	**13**	**5**	30.7	.330	.208	.813	**3.2**	1.6	.7	.2	8.1
2007	Detroit	12	0	11.3	.355	.000	.727	.8	1.2	.3	.1	2.5
2009	Atlanta	11	0	**31.0**	.341	.280	.865	2.7	**2.5**	**1.1**	.3	**11.8**
2010	Chicago	5	0	19.4	**.405**	**.333**	**1.000**	2.6	2.0	.4	.0	8.4
Career		45	5	23.0	.339	.256	.821	2.2	1.7	.6	.2	7.1
