= Mickaël Piétrus =

French basketball player

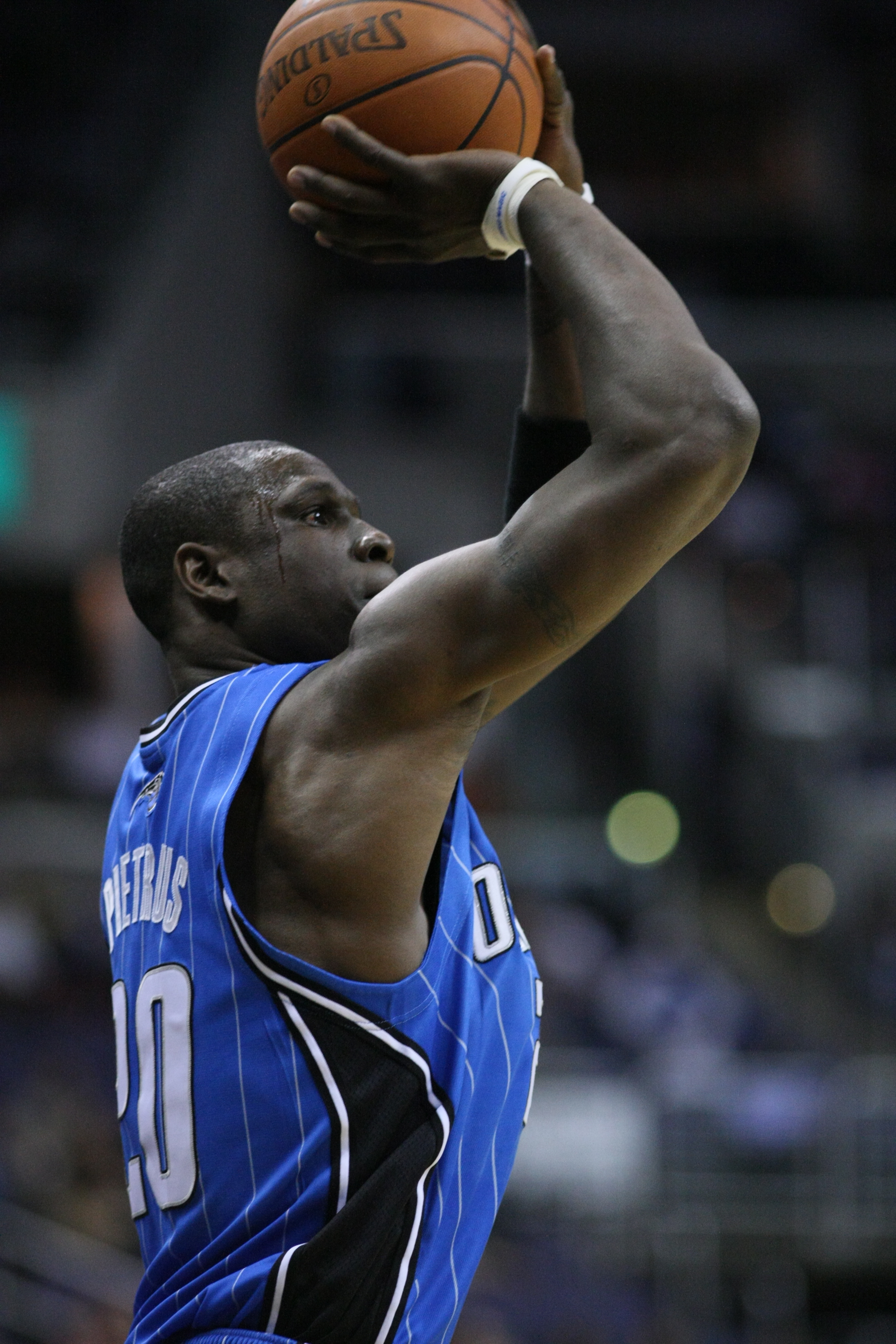
- Piétrus during his tenure with the Orlando Magic

Personal information
- Born: 7 February 1982 (age 44) Les Abymes, Guadeloupe, France
- Listed height: 6 ft 6 in (1.98 m)
- Listed weight: 215 lb (98 kg)

Career information
- NBA draft: 2003: 1st round, 11th overall pick
- Drafted by: Golden State Warriors
- Playing career: 1999–2016
- Position: Small forward / shooting guard
- Number: 2, 20, 12, 28

Career history
- 1999–2003: Élan Béarnais Pau-Orthez
- 2003–2008: Golden State Warriors
- 2008–2010: Orlando Magic
- 2010–2011: Phoenix Suns
- 2011–2012: Boston Celtics
- 2012–2013: Toronto Raptors
- 2015: Mets de Guaynabo
- 2015–2016: SLUC Nancy Basket

Career highlights
- 2× French League champion (2001, 2003); 2× French Cup winner (2002, 2003); French Leaders Cup winner (2003)
- Stats at NBA.com
- Stats at Basketball Reference
Medals
Men's basketball
Representing France
EuroBasket
| Bronze medal – third place | 2005 Serbia |
FIBA Europe Under-18 Championship
| Gold medal – first place | 2000 Croatia | U-18 Team |
FIBA Europe Under-20 Championship
| Bronze medal – third place | 2002 Lithuania | U-20 Team |

Mickaël Marvin Soriano Piétrus (French pronunciation: [mikaɛl pietʁys]; born 7 February 1982) is a French former professional basketball player. Listed at 6 ft 6 in (1.98 m), 215 lb (98 kg), he played both the small forward and shooting guard positions. Piétrus was drafted by the Golden State Warriors with the 11th pick of the 2003 NBA draft, and is originally from Guadeloupe, a Caribbean island.

Piétrus is also known by the nicknames MP, Air France, Euro Jordan and Puma. He speaks French, English, and Antillean Creole fluently.

== Professional career ==
=== Pau-Orthez ===
With ÉB Pau-Orthez, Piétrus won the French League championship, in 2001 and 2003, as well as the French National Cup, in 2002 and 2003.

=== Golden State Warriors ===
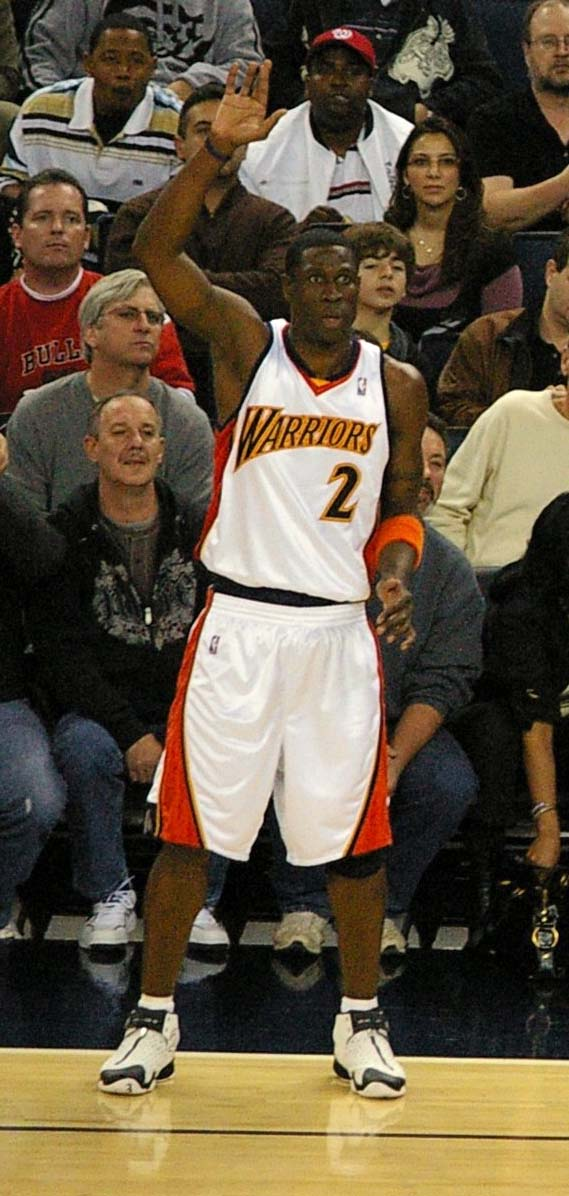
Piétrus with the Warriors in 2008

After leaving France, Piétrus was drafted by the Golden State Warriors. He played there for five seasons with the last being the 07–08 season.

=== Orlando Magic ===
During the 2008 off-season, Piétrus was signed by the Orlando Magic.

In Piétrus's debut, he scored 20 points against the Atlanta Hawks. He continued to be a key player for the Orlando Magic, with one of his best games being against the Dallas Mavericks, where he made 5 three-point field goals to lead the Magic into a comeback and their first win in Dallas.

Piétrus helped the Magic throughout the 2009 NBA Playoffs where the team reached its second Finals appearance and was a successful defender against LeBron James. However, he struggled during the final series against the Los Angeles Lakers, as Kobe Bryant proved too much for him to handle as Orlando fell short in five games.

=== Phoenix Suns ===
On December 18, 2010, Piétrus was traded to the Phoenix Suns along with Vince Carter, Marcin Gortat, a 2011 first-round draft pick, and $3 million, for former Magic player Hedo Türkoğlu, Jason Richardson, and Earl Clark. On December 9, 2011, the Suns tried to trade Piétrus and $1 Million to the Toronto Raptors in exchange for a conditional second round draft pick. One day later, Toronto decided to suspend the trade because Piétrus had a problem with his right knee and it would take 2–4 weeks for it to heal. Piétrus was waived by the Suns on December 22, 2011.

=== Boston Celtics ===
Piétrus signed a $1.3 million deal with the Boston Celtics on December 24, 2011, two days after Phoenix waived him.

On March 23, 2012, Piétrus fell on the floor of the Wells Fargo Center, after being blocked on a layup. He was taken off by stretcher and was diagnosed with a grade three concussion, and ruled out until at least the playoffs. He had been averaging 6.8 points, 2.9 rebounds, and 0.7 assists per game, with the Celtics. He returned in a game against the Atlanta Hawks on April 11, 2012.

=== Toronto Raptors ===
On November 30, 2012, Piétrus signed with the Toronto Raptors. His final NBA game ever was played on March 20, 2013, in a 101–107 loss to the Charlotte Bobcats where he recorded 2 rebounds and 3 fouls.

=== Puerto Rico ===
On March 4, 2015, Piétrus signed with Mets de Guaynabo of Puerto Rico. On May 11, 2015, he was replaced in the line-up by Cedric Jackson.

=== SLUC Nancy Basket ===
On November 25, 2015, Piétrus signed with the French club SLUC Nancy Basket.

== National team career ==
In September 2005, Piétrus won the bronze medal at the EuroBasket 2005, with the senior French national team. He also played at the 2006 FIBA World Championship.

== Personal life ==
Piétrus' older brother, Florent, is also a professional basketball player.

== NBA career statistics ==
Legend
| GP | Games played | GS | Games started | MPG | Minutes per game |
| FG% | Field goal percentage | 3P% | 3-point field goal percentage | FT% | Free throw percentage |
| RPG | Rebounds per game | APG | Assists per game | SPG | Steals per game |
| BPG | Blocks per game | PPG | Points per game | **Bold** | Career high |

=== Regular season ===
| Year | Team | GP | GS | MPG | FG% | 3P% | FT% | RPG | APG | SPG | BPG | PPG |
|---|---|---|---|---|---|---|---|---|---|---|---|---|
| 2003–04 | Golden State | 53 | 22 | 14.1 | .416 | .333 | .693 | 2.2 | .5 | .6 | .2 | 5.3 |
| 2004–05 | Golden State | 67 | 3 | 20.0 | .427 | .344 | .698 | 2.8 | **1.2** | .7 | .3 | 9.5 |
| 2005–06 | Golden State | 52 | 18 | 22.7 | .404 | .318 | .608 | 3.1 | .8 | .6 | .2 | 9.3 |
| 2006–07 | Golden State | 72 | **38** | **26.9** | **.488** | .388 | .648 | **4.5** | .9 | .7 | **.8** | **11.1** |
| 2007–08 | Golden State | 66 | 16 | 19.9 | .439 | .361 | .673 | 3.7 | .7 | **1.0** | .7 | 7.2 |
| 2008–09 | Orlando | 54 | 25 | 24.6 | .413 | .359 | **.709** | 3.3 | 1.2 | .6 | .4 | 9.4 |
| 2009–10 | Orlando | **75** | 24 | 22.5 | .432 | .379 | .633 | 2.9 | .7 | .7 | .4 | 8.7 |
| 2010–11 | Orlando | 19 | 0 | 22.0 | .391 | **.391** | .500 | 2.6 | .5 | .5 | .2 | 6.7 |
| 2010–11 | Phoenix | 38 | 4 | 18.1 | .392 | .342 | .706 | 2.0 | .6 | .5 | .5 | 7.4 |
| 2011–12 | Boston | 42 | 6 | 21.9 | .385 | .335 | .645 | 3.1 | .6 | .5 | .2 | 6.9 |
| 2012–13 | Toronto | 19 | 16 | 20.3 | .347 | .313 | .667 | 1.9 | .5 | .6 | .3 | 5.3 |
| Career | | 557 | 172 | 21.5 | .425 | .355 | .665 | 3.1 | .8 | .7 | .4 | 8.3 |

=== Playoffs ===
| Year | Team | GP | GS | MPG | FG% | 3P% | FT% | RPG | APG | SPG | BPG | PPG |
|---|---|---|---|---|---|---|---|---|---|---|---|---|
| 2007 | Golden State | 11 | 0 | 19.0 | .347 | .259 | .694 | **3.8** | .5 | .5 | **.8** | 6.0 |
| 2009 | Orlando | **24** | 0 | **25.8** | **.483** | .385 | **.723** | 2.6 | .6 | **.8** | .5 | **10.5** |
| 2010 | Orlando | 14 | 0 | 20.1 | .438 | **.459** | .667 | 1.4 | **.7** | .6 | .4 | 8.4 |
| 2012 | Boston | 20 | **1** | 19.6 | .329 | .222 | .563 | 2.0 | .1 | .7 | .3 | 3.5 |
| Career | | 69 | 1 | 21.8 | .426 | .353 | .687 | 2.4 | .5 | .7 | .5 | 7.3 |

== See also ==
- List of French NBA players
- List of European basketball players in the United States
