= Rafer Alston =

American basketball player (born 1976)

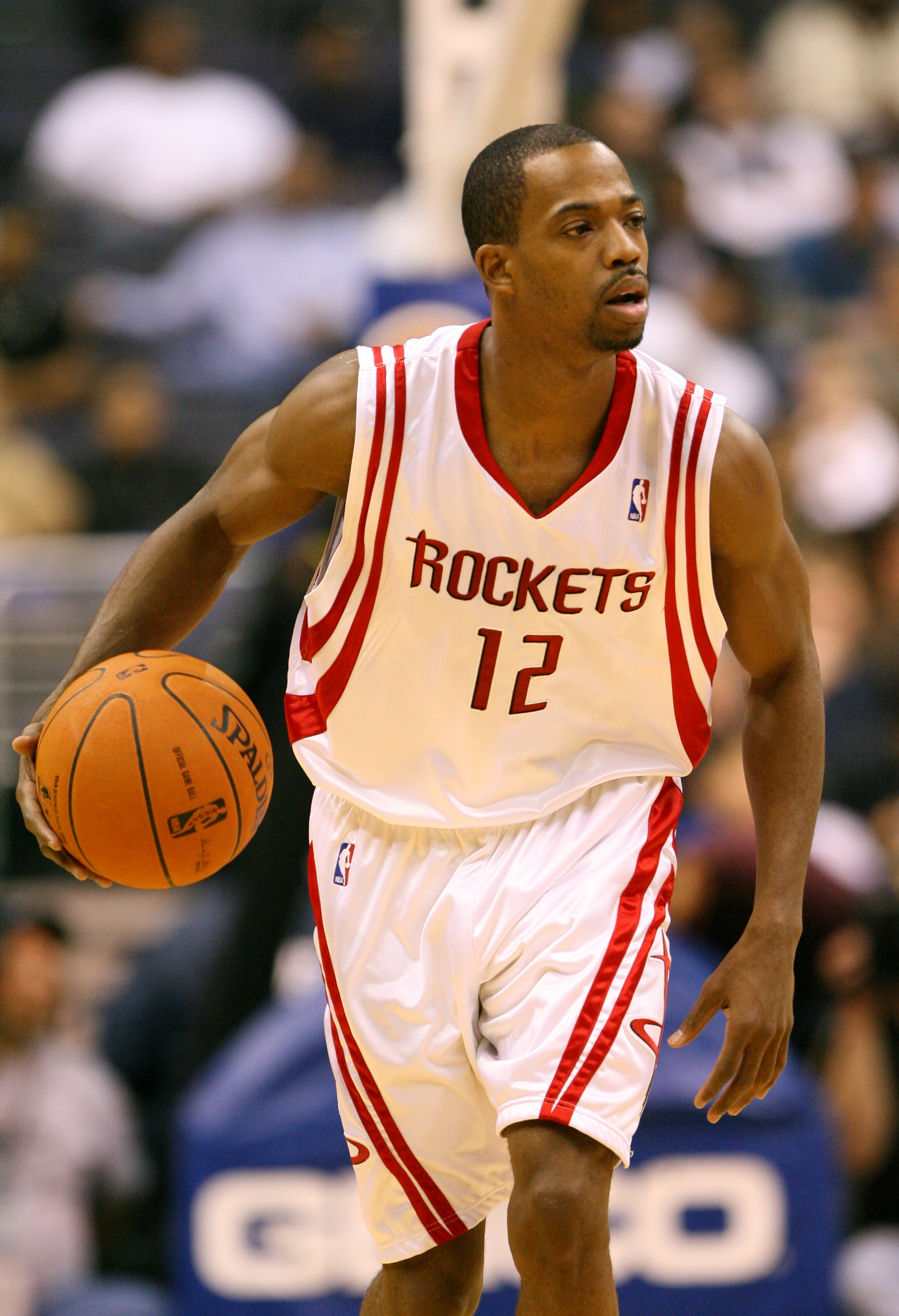
- Alston with the Houston Rockets in 2006

Personal information
- Born: July 24, 1976 (age 50) Queens, New York, U.S.
- Listed height: 6 ft 2 in (1.88 m)
- Listed weight: 190 lb (86 kg)

Career information
- High school: Benjamin N. Cardozo (Queens, New York)
- College: Ventura CC (1994–1995); Fresno CC (1996–1997); Fresno State (1997–1998)
- NBA draft: 1998: 2nd round, 39th overall pick
- Drafted by: Milwaukee Bucks
- Playing career: 1998–2012
- Position: Point guard
- Number: 11, 24, 12, 1

Career history
- 1998–1999: Idaho Stampede
- 1999–2002: Milwaukee Bucks
- 2002–2003: Mobile Revelers
- 2003: Toronto Raptors
- 2003–2004: Miami Heat
- 2004–2005: Toronto Raptors
- 2005–2009: Houston Rockets
- 2009: Orlando Magic
- 2009–2010: New Jersey Nets
- 2010: Miami Heat
- 2011: Zhejiang Lions
- 2012: Los Angeles D-Fenders

Career NBA statistics
- Points: 6,799 (10.1 ppg)
- Rebounds: 1,891 (2.8 rpg)
- Assists: 3,202 (4.8 apg)
- Stats at NBA.com
- Stats at Basketball Reference

Rafer Jamel Alston (born July 24, 1976) is an American retired professional basketball player. Nicknamed "Skip 2 My Lou", (Note: Also stylised as "Skip to My Lou".) Alston first gained basketball fame as a streetball player before joining the National Basketball Association (NBA) with the Milwaukee Bucks. While in the NBA from 1999 to 2010, he played for six teams, including the 2008–09 Orlando Magic team that made the NBA Finals.

== Streetball legend ==
Alston grew up in the Jamaica neighborhood of Queens, New York City, and was a standout streetball basketball player, known for his untraditional ballhandling moves that made him adept at outmaneuvering defenders. He was the inspiration in many ways for the AND1 Mixtape Tour—a low-quality, jerky 1999 videotape of Alston's extreme playground moves, featuring helter-skelter crossover and other fast dribble moves faking out defenders, attracted a great deal of attention among players and basketball fans. His trademark skipping dribble when bringing the ball down the court earned him the nickname, Skip to My Lou.

He also played under well-known high school coach Ron Naclerio at Benjamin Cardozo High School in Queens, New York. Naclerio is credited with circulating the Alston tape and getting it in the hands of AND1 staff.

== College career ==
Alston played college basketball for three seasons: one each at Ventura College (1994–95), Fresno City College (1996–97), and then for Jerry Tarkanian at Fresno State (1997–98). Alston was red-shirted at Fresno City College for the 1995–96 season.

== Professional career ==
=== Milwaukee Bucks (1999–2002) ===
Alston struggled early in his NBA career, but successfully transitioned from streetball to the professional game. He played off the bench for most of the time he was with the Bucks. On November 17, 2001, when filling in for Sam Cassell, Alston led the Bucks to a 104–93 win over the Utah Jazz with 14 points and 10 assists.

=== Toronto Raptors (2003) ===
Alston signed with the Golden State Warriors in 2002, but was waived in October before the season began. On January 17, 2003, he signed with the Toronto Raptors. He played in 47 games, averaged about 21 minutes per game, and averaged 7.8 points per game.

=== Miami Heat (2003–2004) ===
Following his tenure with the Raptors, Alston emerged as a starter for the Miami Heat in 2004. He did not disappoint, averaging 12 points and 4 assists on a young Miami team, led by rookie guard Dwyane Wade, that made it to the Eastern Conference Semi-Finals of the 2004 NBA Playoffs. During that season, in a March 26 game against the Dallas Mavericks, he hit a game-winning shot in overtime with 0.5 seconds left over the outstretched arms of Shawn Bradley to catapult Miami to a 119–118 victory.

=== Return to Toronto (2004–2005) ===
Alston would sign a six-year, $26.3 million deal with the Toronto Raptors in the summer of 2004. In the 2004–2005 season, he played nearly all games that season (80), averaged about 34 minutes per game, and had his best point per game average (14.2) in his career.

=== Houston Rockets (2005–2008) ===
Alston was traded to the Houston Rockets for guard Mike James on October 4, 2005. Although Alston frequently was criticized for his attitude while in Toronto, it is believed that Rockets coach Jeff Van Gundy conferred with his brother, Miami Heat coach Stan Van Gundy, who coached Alston during the 2003–04 NBA season, about Alston's work ethic and attitude. Jeff Van Gundy's reputation for toughness and his ability to get the most out of players previously considered "trouble-makers" or "temperamental" (e.g., Latrell Sprewell) led to optimism on the part of the Rockets' staff. In the 2006–07 season, as the Rockets starting point guard, Alston averaged 13.3 points, 3.4 rebounds, 5.4 assists and 1.6 steals per game. He finished the season ninth in steals among all NBA players, fourth in three-pointers made, and 23rd in assists. On November 12, 2008, Alston was suspended for two games without pay for his role in a fight after a non-call foul with Matt Barnes and Steve Nash.

=== Orlando Magic (2009) ===
Alston was traded to the Orlando Magic in a three-way deal on February 19, 2009, and replaced the injured Jameer Nelson in the team's starting lineup. On April 30, 2009, Alston helped the Orlando Magic defeat the Philadelphia 76ers 4–2 in the first round of the NBA Playoffs. Orlando then defeated the Boston Celtics and Cleveland Cavaliers to advance to the NBA Finals, where they lost to the Los Angeles Lakers in five games. Alston averaged 10.6 points, 3.0 assists, and 2.2 rebounds in the Finals.

=== New Jersey Nets (2009–2010) ===
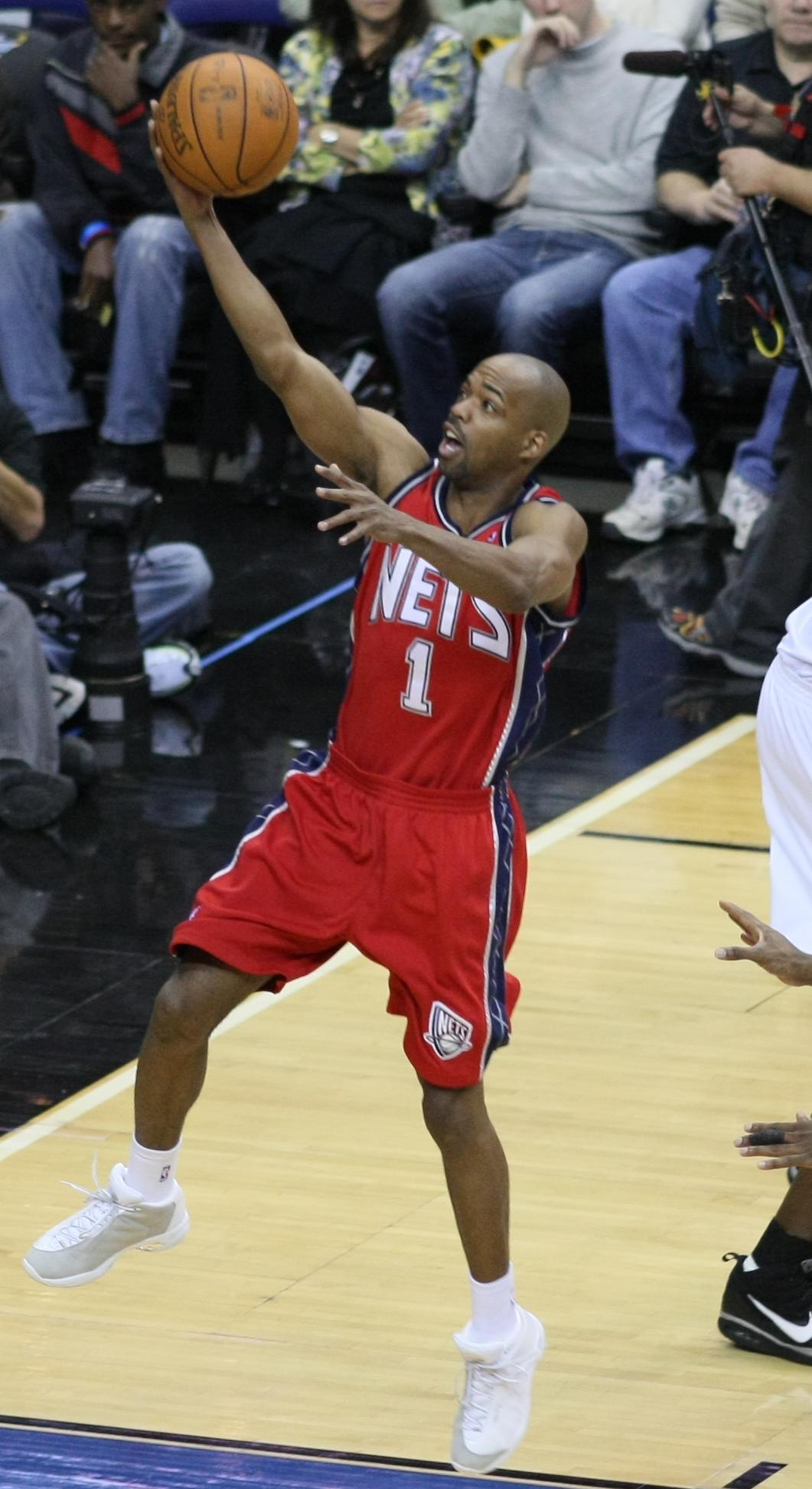
Alston with the New Jersey Nets in 2009

On June 25, 2009, he was traded to the New Jersey Nets along with Tony Battie and Courtney Lee in exchange for Vince Carter and Ryan Anderson. He had his first triple-double as a member of the New Jersey Nets in 2009–2010. On January 5, 2010, he was released by the Nets in hopes of letting him play for a contender.

=== Return to Miami (2010) ===
On January 7, 2010, he cleared waivers and signed with the Miami Heat for the second time. After starting 25 games for Heat, Miami replaced Alston with Carlos Arroyo as starting point guard. In a press release, Miami stated that Alston "made contact with the team via text message...has made himself otherwise unavailable to the team" and he was immediately suspended on March 6, 2010, for missing practice and a game. On March 13, 2010, Miami upgraded his suspension for the remainder of the season. Thus, Alston's final NBA game was played on March 2, 2010, in a 110–106 win over the Golden State Warriors. In Alston's final game, although he was the Heat's starting point guard, he only played for 7 minutes and the only stat he recorded was 1 rebound.

=== Zhejiang Lions (2011) ===
On January 26, 2011, Alston signed with the Zhejiang Lions in the CBA for the remainder of the season. In late February, it was reported that he had left the team to attend a friend's funeral, and the team, believing he was unlikely to return because he had been injured and refused to see a doctor, told him to not return. Alston played 8 games for the Lions and averaged 19.2 points, 3.3 rebounds, 3.4 assists.

=== Los Angeles D-Fenders (2012) ===
In 2012, Alston signed with the Los Angeles D-Fenders of the NBA D-League. This would be his last run as a professional basketball player.

== Legal troubles ==
During 1998, he was convicted of assaulting two neighbors in Fresno.

On Sunday morning, August 5, 2007, Alston was arrested in downtown Houston on misdemeanor charges of assault and public intoxication. The charges brought against Alston for the incident were dropped on February 29, 2008.

He was arrested yet again early Tuesday morning, August 28, 2007, in New York for allegedly slashing a man on the neck during a nightclub altercation. Neither the club owner, police, nor security tapes have provided any evidence of the incident occurring.

He was also arrested on August 7, 2008, and charged with DWI.

== Career statistics ==
Legend
| GP | Games played | GS | Games started | MPG | Minutes per game |
| FG% | Field goal percentage | 3P% | 3-point field goal percentage | FT% | Free throw percentage |
| RPG | Rebounds per game | APG | Assists per game | SPG | Steals per game |
| BPG | Blocks per game | PPG | Points per game | **Bold** | Career high |

| Led the league |

=== College ===
| Year | Team | GP | GS | MPG | FG% | 3P% | FT% | RPG | APG | SPG | BPG | PPG |
|---|---|---|---|---|---|---|---|---|---|---|---|---|
| 1997–98 | Fresno State | 33 | – | 31.2 | .401 | .337 | .758 | 2.2 | 7.3 | 2.1 | .4 | 11.0 |

=== NBA ===
==== Regular season ====
| Year | Team | GP | GS | MPG | FG% | 3P% | FT% | RPG | APG | SPG | BPG | PPG |
|---|---|---|---|---|---|---|---|---|---|---|---|---|
| 1999–2000 | Milwaukee | 27 | 0 | 13.4 | .284 | .214 | .750 | .9 | 2.6 | .4 | .0 | 2.3 |
| 2000–01 | Milwaukee | 37 | 2 | 7.8 | .357 | .267 | .692 | .8 | 1.8 | .4 | .0 | 2.1 |
| 2001–02 | Milwaukee | 50 | 7 | 12.0 | .346 | .380 | .621 | 1.4 | 2.9 | .6 | .0 | 3.5 |
| 2002–03 | Toronto | 47 | 4 | 20.9 | **.415** | **.392** | .685 | 2.3 | 4.1 | .8 | **.3** | 7.8 |
| 2003–04 | Miami | **82** | 28 | 31.5 | .376 | .371 | **.769** | 2.8 | 4.5 | 1.4 | .2 | 10.2 |
| 2004–05 | Toronto | 80 | 78 | 34.0 | .414 | .357 | .740 | 3.5 | 6.4 | 1.5 | .1 | **14.2** |
| 2005–06 | Houston | 63 | 63 | **38.6** | .379 | .327 | .692 | **4.0** | **6.7** | 1.6 | .2 | 12.1 |
| 2006–07 | Houston | **82*** | **82*** | 37.1 | .375 | .363 | .734 | 3.4 | 5.4 | 1.6 | .1 | 13.3 |
| 2007–08 | Houston | 74 | 74 | 34.1 | .394 | .351 | .715 | 3.5 | 5.3 | 1.3 | .2 | 13.1 |
| 2008–09 | Houston | 48 | 48 | 33.1 | .370 | .348 | .789 | 3.0 | 5.4 | 1.2 | .1 | 11.5 |
| 2008–09 | Orlando | 28 | 28 | 29.5 | .413 | .317 | .707 | 2.9 | 5.1 | **1.8** | .1 | 12.0 |
| 2009–10 | New Jersey | 27 | 13 | 28.4 | .343 | .322 | .815 | 2.8 | 3.9 | 1.0 | .2 | 9.7 |
| 2009–10 | Miami | 25 | 25 | 26.2 | .355 | .370 | .556 | 2.2 | 2.9 | .9 | .2 | 6.6 |
| Career | | 671 | 452 | 28.9 | .383 | .354 | .729 | 2.8 | 4.8 | 1.2 | .2 | 10.1 |

==== Playoffs ====
| Year | Team | GP | GS | MPG | FG% | 3P% | FT% | RPG | APG | SPG | BPG | PPG |
|---|---|---|---|---|---|---|---|---|---|---|---|---|
| 2000 | Milwaukee | 4 | 0 | 4.0 | .000 | .000 | .000 | .0 | .3 | .0 | .0 | .0 |
| 2001 | Milwaukee | 5 | 0 | 1.6 | .000 | .000 | .000 | .0 | .2 | .0 | .0 | .0 |
| 2004 | Miami | 13 | 0 | 22.7 | .319 | .231 | **.840** | 2.2 | 1.7 | .4 | .1 | 7.0 |
| 2007 | Houston | 7 | 7 | **44.1** | .338 | .320 | .769 | **6.9** | **5.0** | **1.9** | **.4** | 10.9 |
| 2008 | Houston | 4 | 4 | 31.5 | **.438** | **.440** | .800 | 1.5 | 4.5 | 1.0 | .0 | **14.3** |
| 2009 | Orlando | **23** | **23** | 32.2 | .380 | .319 | .750 | 2.4 | 4.1 | 1.4 | .2 | 12.2 |
| Career | | 56 | 34 | 26.7 | .365 | .311 | .764 | 2.5 | 3.1 | 1.0 | .1 | 9.0 |

== See also ==
- List of National Basketball Association players with 9 or more steals in a game
