= 2008–09 Cleveland Cavaliers season =

NBA professional basketball team season

- Division champions
- Head coach: Mike Brown
- General manager: Danny Ferry
- Owner: Dan Gilbert
- Arena: Quicken Loans Arena

Results
- Record: 66–16 (.805)
- Place: Division: 1st (Central); Conference: 1st (Eastern)
- Playoff finish: Eastern Conference Finals (lost to Magic 2–4)
- Stats at Basketball Reference

Local media
- Television: Fox Sports Ohio; WUAB
- Radio: WTAM

The 2008–09 Cleveland Cavaliers season was the 39th season of the franchise in the National Basketball Association (NBA). They finished the regular season with 66 wins and 16 losses, the best record in the NBA, which easily surpassed the previous franchise best of 57–25 from the 1988–89 and 1991–92 seasons. LeBron James won his first MVP Award and finished second in Defensive Player of the Year voting. The Cavaliers had the fourth best team offensive rating and the third best team defensive rating in the NBA.

In the playoffs, the Cavaliers swept the Detroit Pistons in the First Round in four games, swept the Atlanta Hawks in the Semifinals in four games, before losing to the Orlando Magic in the conference finals in six games, despite the Cavaliers being heavily favored to beat the Magic. The Magic would go on to lose to the Los Angeles Lakers in the NBA Finals in five games. Prior to their elimination by the Magic, many had expected the Cavs to appear in the Finals, which would've also been LeBron and Kobe Bryant's first head-to-head meeting in the NBA Finals.

This was the last time that James lost in the conference finals until 2023 when the Lakers were swept by the eventual champion, the Denver Nuggets, in four games.

== Key dates ==
- June 26: The 2008 NBA draft took place in New York City.
- July 1: The [Free agency] period started.
- On October 7, the Cavaliers' pre-season began with an 84–104 loss to Toronto Raptors.
- On October 28, the Cavaliers' regular season started with a 90–99 loss at the Boston Celtics.
- On October 30, the Cavaliers beat the Charlotte Bobcats 96–79 for their first win in their home opener.
- On November 8, the Cavaliers beat the Chicago Bulls 106–97 to improve their record to 5-2 and take over first place in the Central Division.
- On November 18, the Cavaliers beat the New Jersey Nets 106–82 for their then season-high eighth straight win and improved their record to a then season high seven games over .500 (9–2).
- On December 3, the Cavaliers beat the New York Knicks 118–82 to set a franchise record by starting the season with ten straight home wins.
- On December 9, the Cavaliers beat the Toronto Raptors 114–94 to set an NBA record by winning nine straight games by 12 or more points.
- On December 12, the Cavaliers beat the Philadelphia 76ers 88–72 for their season best 11th straight win (which tied a franchise record), to improve to a then season high seventeen games over .500, their best 23 game start in franchise history (20–3), and to improve their franchise record by starting the season with thirteen straight home wins.
- On December 28, the Cavaliers beat the Miami Heat 93–86 to improve to a season high 22 games over .500, their best 30 game start in franchise history (26–4), and to improve their franchise record by starting the season with 16 straight home wins.
- On January 7, the Cavaliers beat the Charlotte Bobcats 111–81 for their best 34 game start in franchise history (28–6), to improve their franchise record by starting the season with 18 straight home wins, to take over first place in the Eastern Conference and to take a share of the best record in the NBA with the Los Angeles Lakers.
- On January 9, the Cavaliers beat the Boston Celtics 98–83 to improve to a season high 23 games over .500, their best 35 game start in franchise history (29–6), and to improve their franchise record by starting the season with 19 straight home wins.
- On January 23, the Cavaliers beat the Golden State Warriors 106–105 to improve to a season high 25 games over .500, their best 41 game start in franchise history (33–8).
- On February 3, the Cavaliers beat the Toronto Raptors 101–83 to get their franchise record 23rd straight home victory, and improved to 38–9 overall on the season.
- On February 8, the Cavaliers lost to the Los Angeles Lakers 91–101, their first home loss of the year, dropping to 23–1 at home and 39–10 overall on the season.
- On February 10, the Cavaliers lost to the Indiana Pacers 95–96, marking their first consecutive losses of the season.
- On March 2, the Cavaliers beat the Miami Heat 107–100, improving to 47-12 and marking the first time in franchise history the team was 35 games over .500.
- On March 4, the Cavaliers beat the Milwaukee Bucks 91–73, becoming the first team in the league to clinch a playoff berth.
- On March 13, the Cavaliers beat the Sacramento Kings 126–123, clinching the Central Division title: their first since the 1975–76 season and their second in franchise history.
- On March 19, the Cavaliers tied an NBA record by committing just 2 turnovers in a 97–92 overtime victory over the Portland Trail Blazers.
- On March 24, the Cavaliers beat the New Jersey Nets 98–87, improving their record to 58–13 and setting a franchise record for wins in a season.
- On March 31, the Cavaliers beat the Detroit Pistons 79–73, extending their winning streak to a new franchise record 13 wins in a row, setting a new franchise record and tying an NBA record for wins in any month by improving to 16–1 in March, and extending their franchise record for wins in a season, improving to 61–13.
- On April 10, the Cavaliers beat the Philadelphia 76ers 102–92, clinching the best record in the Eastern Conference for the first time in franchise history.
- On April 13, the Cavaliers beat the Indiana Pacers 117–109, clinching the best record in the NBA and home-court advantage throughout the playoffs, the first time ever the Cavaliers have done so.
- On April 15, the Cavaliers concluded their regular season with a 111–110 loss to the Philadelphia 76ers in OT. They finished the season 66–16, going 39–2 at home and 27–14 on the road. Their home record was the second-best in NBA history.
- On April 26, the Cavaliers advanced to the second round of the playoffs by defeating the Detroit Pistons four games to none.
- On May 9, the Cavaliers defeated the Atlanta Hawks 97–82 and became the first team in NBA history to win seven consecutive playoff games by a double-digit margin.
- On May 11, the Cavaliers defeated the Atlanta Hawks 84–74, earning a spot in the NBA Eastern Conference finals. It was also the first time in franchise history they swept two consecutive playoff series.
- On May 30, the Cavs' season ended when they lost to the Orlando Magic in Game 6 of the Eastern Conference finals, 103–90, in Orlando. The Magic took Game 1 in Cleveland with a 1-point victory, lost Game 2 also by 1-point thanks to James' first career playoff buzzer, and went on to win the series 4–2 before going on to lose to the Los Angeles Lakers 4–1 in the NBA Finals. Eight of the last nine Eastern Conference No. 1 seeded teams have been beaten in the conference finals.

== Offseason ==
On June 26, 2008, the Cavaliers acquired the draft rights to forward Darnell Jackson from the Miami Heat in exchange for the lower of the Cavaliers two second-round picks in the 2009 NBA Draft. In addition, Cleveland purchased the rights to center Sasha Kaun from the Seattle SuperSonics.

On August 4, 2008, the Cavaliers signed Tarence Kinsey to a one-year contract.

On August 13, 2008, the Cavaliers traded Damon Jones and Joe Smith to the Milwaukee Bucks for Maurice Williams as part of a three-team, a six-player deal among the Cavaliers, Milwaukee Bucks and Oklahoma City.

On September 5, 2008, the Cavaliers signed Lorenzen Wright to a one-year contract. Second year swingman Gabe Skinner waived to make room for the acquisition.

== Draft picks ==
Round	Pick	Player	Position	Nationality	College
1	19	J. J. Hickson	PF	USA	NC State

== Roster ==
2008–09 Cleveland Cavaliers roster
Players

Pos.	No.	Player	Height	Weight	DOB	From
PG	1	Daniel Gibson	6 ft 2 in (1.88 m)	200 lb (91 kg)	1986-02-27	Texas
C	21	J. J. Hickson	6 ft 9 in (2.06 m)	242 lb (110 kg)	1988-09-04	NC State
C	11	Žydrūnas Ilgauskas	7 ft 3 in (2.21 m)	260 lb (118 kg)	1975-06-05	Lithuania
PF	00	Darnell Jackson	6 ft 9 in (2.06 m)	253 lb (115 kg)	1985-11-07	Kansas
SF	23	LeBron James	6 ft 8 in (2.03 m)	245 lb (111 kg)	1984-12-30	St. Vincent–St. Mary HS (OH)
SG	8	Tarence Kinsey	6 ft 6 in (1.98 m)	189 lb (86 kg)	1984-03-21	South Carolina
SF	3	Sasha Pavlović	6 ft 7 in (2.01 m)	235 lb (107 kg)	1983-11-15	Serbia
C	32	Joe Smith	6 ft 10 in (2.08 m)	225 lb (102 kg)	1975-07-26	Maryland
PG	20	Eric Snow	6 ft 3 in (1.91 m)	190 lb (86 kg)	1973-04-24	Michigan State
SF	10	Wally Szczerbiak	6 ft 7 in (2.01 m)	240 lb (109 kg)	1977-03-05	Miami (OH)
PF	17	Anderson Varejão	6 ft 11 in (2.11 m)	260 lb (118 kg)	1982-09-28	Brazil
F/C	4	Ben Wallace	6 ft 9 in (2.06 m)	240 lb (109 kg)	1974-09-10	Virginia Union
SG	13	Delonte West	6 ft 3 in (1.91 m)	180 lb (82 kg)	1983-07-26	Saint Joseph's
SF	31	Jawad Williams	6 ft 9 in (2.06 m)	218 lb (99 kg)	1983-02-19	North Carolina
PG	2	Mo Williams	6 ft 1 in (1.85 m)	190 lb (86 kg)	1982-12-19	Alabama
C	55	Lorenzen Wright	6 ft 11 in (2.11 m)	255 lb (116 kg)	1975-11-04	Memphis

Coaches
Head coach
- Mike Brown
Assistant(s)
- Hank Egan
- Melvin Hunt
- Chris Jent
- Michael Malone

Legend
- (DP) Unsigned draft pick
- (FA) Free agent
- (S) Suspended
- Injured

Roster
Updated: April 9, 2009

== Regular season ==
=== Standings ===
Central Division	W	L	PCT	GB	Home	Road	Div	GP
z-Cleveland Cavaliers	66	16	.805	—	39–2	27–14	13–3	82
x-Chicago Bulls	41	41	.500	25	28–13	13–28	9–7	82
x-Detroit Pistons	39	43	.476	27	21–20	18–23	7–9	82
Indiana Pacers	36	46	.439	30	25–16	11–30	7–9	82
Milwaukee Bucks	34	48	.415	32	22–19	12–29	4–12	82

#	Eastern Conference				
#	Team	W	L	PCT	GB
1	z-Cleveland Cavaliers	66	16	.805	—
2	y-Boston Celtics	62	20	.756	4
3	y-Orlando Magic	59	23	.720	7
4	x-Atlanta Hawks	47	35	.573	19
5	x-Miami Heat	43	39	.524	23
6	x-Philadelphia 76ers	41	41	.500	25
7	x-Chicago Bulls	41	41	.500	25
8	x-Detroit Pistons	39	43	.476	27
9	Indiana Pacers	36	46	.439	30
10	Charlotte Bobcats	35	47	.427	31
11	New Jersey Nets	34	48	.415	32
12	Milwaukee Bucks	34	48	.415	32
13	Toronto Raptors	33	49	.402	33
14	New York Knicks	32	50	.390	34
15	Washington Wizards	19	63	.232	47

=== Game log ===
2008–09 game log
Total: 66–16 (home: 39–2; road: 27–14)
October: 1–1 (home: 1–0; road: 0–1)

Game	Date	Team	Score	High points	High rebounds	High assists	Location Attendance	Record
1	October 28	@ Boston	L 85–90	LeBron James (22)	Anderson Varejão (9)	LeBron James (6)	TD Banknorth Garden; 18,624	0–1
2	October 30	Charlotte	W 96–79	Daniel Gibson (25)	Ben Wallace (10)	LeBron James (9)	Quicken Loans Arena; 20,562	1-1

November : 13–2 (home: 8–0; road: 5–2)

Game	Date	Team	Score	High points	High rebounds	High assists	Location Attendance	Record
3	November 1	@ New Orleans	L 92–104	Žydrūnas Ilgauskas (18)	Ben Wallace (8)	LeBron James (13)	New Orleans Arena; 18,150	1–2
4	November 3	@ Dallas	W 100–81	LeBron James (29)	Ben Wallace (13)	Maurice Williams (6)	American Airlines Center; 19,923	2–2
5	November 5	Chicago	W 107–93	LeBron James (41)	Ben Wallace (14)	LeBron James (6)	Quicken Loans Arena; 20,562	3–2
6	November 7	Indiana	W 111–107	LeBron James (27)	LeBron James (9)	LeBron James (8)	Quicken Loans Arena; 20,562	4–2
7	November 8	@ Chicago	W 106–97	LeBron James (41)	LeBron James (13)	Maurice Williams (7)	United Center; 21,965	5–2
8	November 11	Milwaukee	W 99–93	LeBron James (41)	Varejão, Ilgauskas (10)	LeBron James (6)	Quicken Loans Arena; 19,842	6–2
9	November 13	Denver	W 110–99	Maurice Williams (24)	James, Varejão (8)	LeBron James (11)	Quicken Loans Arena; 20,562	7–2
10	November 15	Utah	W 105–93	LeBron James (38)	Ben Wallace (10)	LeBron James (7)	Quicken Loans Arena; 20,562	8–2
11	November 18	@ New Jersey	W 106–82	LeBron James (31)	Žydrūnas Ilgauskas (9)	Maurice Williams (6)	Izod Center; 16,911	9–2
12	November 19	@ Detroit	L 89–96	Williams, James (25)	Anderson Varejão (11)	LeBron James (6)	The Palace of Auburn Hills; 22,076	9–3
13	November 22	Atlanta	W 110–96	LeBron James (24)	Ben Wallace (8)	LeBron James (8)	Quicken Loans Arena; 20,562	10–3
14	November 25	@ New York	W 119–101	LeBron James (26)	Žydrūnas Ilgauskas (10)	Daniel Gibson (7)	Madison Square Garden; 19,763	11–3
15	November 26	Oklahoma City	W 117–82	Žydrūnas Ilgauskas (17)	Ilgauskas, Varejão (7)	Delonte West (10)	Quicken Loans Arena; 19,753	12–3
16	November 28	Golden State	W 112–97	LeBron James (23)	Szczerbiak, Wallace (9)	LeBron James (8)	Quicken Loans Arena; 20,562	13–3
17	November 29	@ Milwaukee	W 97–85	LeBron James (32)	Žydrūnas Ilgauskas (17)	James, West (5)	Bradley Center; 16,237	14–3

December : 12–2 (home: 7–0; road: 5–2)

Game	Date	Team	Score	High points	High rebounds	High assists	Location Attendance	Record
18	December 3	New York	W 118–82	LeBron James (21)	Ilgauskas, Varejão (10)	LeBron James (6)	Quicken Loans Arena; 20,562	15–3
19	December 5	Indiana	W 97–73	Williams, Varejão, Ilgauskas (17)	Ilgauskas, James (8)	LeBron James (11)	Quicken Loans Arena; 20,562	16–3
20	December 6	@ Charlotte	W 94–74	LeBron James (25)	Žydrūnas Ilgauskas (11)	Daniel Gibson (5)	Time Warner Cable Arena; 19,133	17–3
21	December 9	Toronto	W 114–94	LeBron James (31)	Žydrūnas Ilgauskas (6)	Maurice Williams (9)	Quicken Loans Arena; 20,049	18–3
22	December 10	@ Philadelphia	W 101–93	LeBron James (29)	Ben Wallace (10)	LeBron James (5)	Wachovia Center; 15,550	19–3
23	December 12	Philadelphia	W 88–72	LeBron James (28)	Darnell Jackson (8)	LeBron James (7)	Quicken Loans Arena; 20,562	20–3
24	December 13	@ Atlanta	L 92–97	LeBron James (33)	Anderson Varejão (8)	LeBron James (9)	Philips Arena; 19,200	20–4
25	December 17	@ Minnesota	W 93–70	LeBron James (32)	Anderson Varejão (11)	Delonte West (5)	Target Center; 14,899	21–4
26	December 19	@ Denver	W 105–88	LeBron James (33)	LeBron James (10)	LeBron James (8)	Pepsi Center; 19,155	22–4
27	December 21	@ Oklahoma City	W 102–91	LeBron James (31)	Wallace, Varejão (6)	LeBron James (7)	Ford Center; 19,136	23–4
28	December 23	Houston	W 99–90	LeBron James (27)	LeBron James (9)	LeBron James (5)	Quicken Loans Arena; 20,562	24–4
29	December 25	Washington	W 93–89	Maurice Williams (24)	Anderson Varejão (13)	Delonte West (7)	Quicken Loans Arena; 20,562	25–4
30	December 28	Miami	W 93–86	LeBron James (33)	Ben Wallace (14)	LeBron James (9)	Quicken Loans Arena; 20,562	26–4
31	December 30	@ Miami	L 95–104	LeBron James (38)	Anderson Varejão (10)	LeBron James (7)	American Airlines Arena; 19,600	26–5

January : 10–4 (home: 6–0; road: 4–4)

Game	Date	Team	Score	High points	High rebounds	High assists	Location Attendance	Record
32	January 2	Chicago	W 117–92	Anderson Varejão (26)	LeBron James (10)	LeBron James (11)	Quicken Loans Arena; 20,562	27–5
33	January 4	@ Washington	L 77–80	LeBron James (30)	Anderson Varejão (10)	LeBron James (10)	Verizon Center; 20,173	27–6
34	January 7	Charlotte	W 111–81	LeBron James (21)	Ben Wallace (9)	Delonte West (7)	Quicken Loans Arena; 20,562	28–6
35	January 9	Boston	W 98–83	LeBron James (38)	Anderson Varejão (9)	LeBron James (6)	Quicken Loans Arena; 20,562	29–6
36	January 13	@ Memphis	W 102–87	LeBron James (30)	LeBron James (11)	LeBron James (10)	FedExForum; 15,121	30–6
37	January 15	@ Chicago	L 93–102 (OT)	LeBron James (28)	LeBron James (14)	LeBron James (7)	United Center; 21,297	30–7
38	January 16	New Orleans	W 92–78	LeBron James (29)	LeBron James (14)	LeBron James (7)	Quicken Loans Arena; 20,562	31–7
39	January 19	@ L.A. Lakers	L 88–105	LeBron James (23)	Anderson Varejão (12)	Maurice Williams (5)	Staples Center; 18,997	31–8
40	January 21	@ Portland	W 104–98	LeBron James (34)	Wally Szczerbiak (10)	LeBron James (14)	Rose Garden; 20,632	32–8
41	January 23	@ Golden State	W 106–105	LeBron James (32)	James, Pavlović, Varejão (9)	LeBron James (8)	Oracle Arena; 19,596	33–8
42	January 24	@ Utah	W 102–97	LeBron James (33)	LeBron James (14)	LeBron James (9)	EnergySolutions Arena; 19,911	34–8
43	January 27	Sacramento	W 117–110	Maurice Williams (43)	LeBron James (15)	Maurice Williams, LeBron James (11)	Quicken Loans Arena; 20,562	35–8
44	January 29	@ Orlando	L 88–99	LeBron James (23)	James, Varejão (8)	LeBron James (8)	Amway Arena; 17,461	35–9
45	January 30	L.A. Clippers	W 112–95	LeBron James (25)	Ilgauskas, Wallace (11)	James, Williams (6)	Quicken Loans Arena; 20,562	36–9

February : 9–3 (home: 4–1; road: 5–2)

Game	Date	Team	Score	High points	High rebounds	High assists	Location Attendance	Record
46	February 1	@ Detroit	W 90–80	LeBron James (33)	Žydrūnas Ilgauskas (8)	LeBron James (8)	The Palace of Auburn Hills; 22,076	37–9
47	February 3	Toronto	W 101–83	LeBron James (33)	Žydrūnas Ilgauskas (8)	Maurice Williams (9)	Quicken Loans Arena; 20,562	38–9
48	February 4	@ New York	W 107–102	LeBron James (52)	Wally Szczerbiak (13)	LeBron James (11)	Madison Square Garden; 19,763	39–9
49	February 8	L.A. Lakers	L 91–101	Žydrūnas Ilgauskas (22)	Ilgauskas, Varejão (9)	LeBron James (12)	Quicken Loans Arena; 20,562	39–10
50	February 10	@ Indiana	L 95–96	LeBron James (47)	Žydrūnas Ilgauskas (11)	LeBron James (4)	Conseco Fieldhouse; 18,165	39–11
51	February 11	Phoenix	W 109–92	Maurice Williams (44)	Ben Wallace (11)	Maurice Williams (7)	Quicken Loans Arena; 20,562	40–11
All-Star Break
52	February 18	@ Toronto	W 93–76	Žydrūnas Ilgauskas (22)	Anderson Varejão (14)	LeBron James (9)	Air Canada Centre; 19,800	41–11
53	February 20	@ Milwaukee	W 111–103	LeBron James (55)	Anderson Varejão (7)	LeBron James (9)	Bradley Center; 18,076	42–11
54	February 22	Detroit	W 99–78	Delonte West (25)	Žydrūnas Ilgauskas (8)	LeBron James (9)	Quicken Loans Arena; 20,562	43–11
55	February 24	Memphis	W 94–79	Daniel Gibson (19)	J. J. Hickson (9)	LeBron James (8)	Quicken Loans Arena; 20,562	44–11
56	February 26	@ Houston	L 74–93	James, Williams (21)	Žydrūnas Ilgauskas (13)	Maurice Williams (4)	Toyota Center; 18,399	44–12
57	February 27	@ San Antonio	W 97–86	LeBron James (30)	LeBron James (14)	Delonte West (5)	AT&T Center; 18,797	45–12

March : 16–1 (home: 10–0; road: 6–1)

Game	Date	Team	Score	High points	High rebounds	High assists	Location Attendance	Record
58	March 1	@ Atlanta	W 88–87	LeBron James (26)	Žydrūnas Ilgauskas (11)	LeBron James (11)	Philips Arena; 19,639	46–12
59	March 2	@ Miami	W 107–100	LeBron James (42)	Žydrūnas Ilgauskas (15)	Maurice Williams (7)	American Airlines Arena; 19,600	47–12
60	March 4	Milwaukee	W 91–73	LeBron James (23)	Anderson Varejão (9)	James, West (4)	Quicken Loans Arena; 20,562	48–12
61	March 6	@ Boston	L 94–105	Maurice Williams (26)	James, West (6)	Delonte West (8)	TD Banknorth Garden; 18,624	48–13
62	March 7	Miami	W 99–89	Maurice Williams (29)	LeBron James (10)	LeBron James (12)	Quicken Loans Arena; 20,562	49–13
63	March 10	@ L.A. Clippers	W 87–83	LeBron James (32)	LeBron James (13)	LeBron James (11)	Staples Center; 19,060	50–13
64	March 12	@ Phoenix	W 119–111	LeBron James (34)	LeBron James (10)	LeBron James (13)	US Airways Center; 18,422	51–13
65	March 13	@ Sacramento	W 126–123 (OT)	LeBron James (51)	Anderson Varejão (12)	LeBron James (9)	ARCO Arena; 16,317	52–13
66	March 15	New York	W 98–93	Maurice Williams (23)	Anderson Varejão (9)	LeBron James (10)	Quicken Loans Arena; 20,562	53–13
67	March 17	Orlando	W 97–93	LeBron James (43)	LeBron James (12)	LeBron James (8)	Quicken Loans Arena; 20,562	54–13
68	March 19	Portland	W 97–92 (OT)	LeBron James (26)	LeBron James (11)	LeBron James (10)	Quicken Loans Arena; 20,562	55–13
69	March 21	Atlanta	W 102–96	Maurice Willams (24)	Jackson, Varejão (8)	Maurice Williams (7)	Quicken Loans Arena; 20,562	56–13
70	March 22	@ New Jersey	W 96–88	LeBron James (30)	James, Varejão (11)	LeBron James (8)	Izod Center; 18,348	57–13
71	March 25	New Jersey	W 98–87	LeBron James (22)	Anderson Varejão (11)	LeBron James (11)	Quicken Loans Arena; 20,562	58–13
72	March 27	Minnesota	W 107–85	LeBron James (25)	LeBron James (12)	LeBron James (7)	Quicken Loans Arena; 20,562	59–13
73	March 29	Dallas	W 102–74	LeBron James (24)	Joe Smith (13)	LeBron James (12)	Quicken Loans Arena; 20,562	60–13
74	March 31	Detroit	W 79–73	LeBron James (25)	LeBron James (12)	Delonte West (6)	Quicken Loans Arena; 20,562	61–13

April : 5–3 (home: 3–1; road: 2–2)

Game	Date	Team	Score	High points	High rebounds	High assists	Location Attendance	Record
75	April 2	@ Washington	L 101–109	LeBron James (31)	LeBron James (9)	Delonte West (7)	Verizon Center; 20,173	61–14
76	April 3	@ Orlando	L 87–116	LeBron James (26)	LeBron James (9)	LeBron James (5)	Amway Arena; 17,461	61–15
77	April 5	San Antonio	W 101–81	LeBron James (38)	Žydrūnas Ilgauskas (10)	LeBron James (6)	Quicken Loans Arena; 20,562	62–15
78	April 8	Washington	W 98–86	LeBron James (21)	Žydrūnas Ilgauskas (13)	LeBron James (7)	Quicken Loans Arena; 20,562	63–15
79	April 10	@ Philadelphia	W 102–92	LeBron James (27)	Žydrūnas Ilgauskas (9)	LeBron James (10)	Wachovia Center; 20,484	64–15
80	April 12	Boston	W 107–76	LeBron James (29)	Žydrūnas Ilgauskas (10)	LeBron James (7)	Quicken Loans Arena; 20,562	65–15
81	April 13	@ Indiana	W 117–109	LeBron James (37)	Anderson Varejão (11)	Maurice Williams (8)	Conseco Fieldhouse; 18,165	66–15
82	April 15	Philadelphia	L 110–111 (OT)	Daniel Gibson (28)	Jackson, Wally Szczerbiak (8)	Wally Szczerbiak (8)	Quicken Loans Arena; 20,562	66–16

2008–09 schedule

== Playoffs ==
2009 playoff game log
First Round: 4–0 (home: 2–0; road: 2–0)

Game	Date	Team	Score	High points	High rebounds	High assists	Location Attendance	Series
1	April 18	Detroit	W 102–84	LeBron James (38)	Zydrunas Ilgauskas (10)	LeBron James (7)	Quicken Loans Arena; 20,562	1–0
2	April 21	Detroit	W 94–82	LeBron James (29)	LeBron James (13)	Mo Williams (7)	Quicken Loans Arena; 20,562	2–0
3	April 24	@ Detroit	W 79–68	LeBron James (25)	LeBron James (11)	LeBron James (9)	The Palace of Auburn Hills; 22,076	3–0
4	April 26	@ Detroit	W 99–78	LeBron James (36)	LeBron James (13)	LeBron James (8)	The Palace of Auburn Hills; 22,076	4–0

Conference Semifinals: 4–0 (home: 2–0; road: 2–0)

Game	Date	Team	Score	High points	High rebounds	High assists	Location Attendance	Series
1	May 5	Atlanta	W 99–72	LeBron James (34)	LeBron James (10)	Delonte West (9)	Quicken Loans Arena; 20,562	1–0
2	May 7	Atlanta	W 105–85	LeBron James (27)	Anderson Varejão (8)	James, Williams (5)	Quicken Loans Arena; 20,562	2–0
3	May 9	@ Atlanta	W 97–82	LeBron James (47)	LeBron James (12)	LeBron James (8)	Philips Arena; 20,143	3–0
4	May 11	@ Atlanta	W 84–74	LeBron James (27)	Anderson Varejão (11)	LeBron James (8)	Philips Arena; 19,241	4–0

Conference Finals: 2–4 (home: 2–1; road: 0–3)

Game	Date	Team	Score	High points	High rebounds	High assists	Location Attendance	Series
1	May 20	Orlando	L 106–107	LeBron James (49)	Žydrūnas Ilgauskas (10)	LeBron James (8)	Quicken Loans Arena; 20,562	0–1
2	May 22	Orlando	W 96–95	LeBron James (35)	Žydrūnas Ilgauskas (15)	James, Williams (5)	Quicken Loans Arena; 20,562	1–1
3	May 24	@ Orlando	L 89–99	LeBron James (41)	Žydrūnas Ilgauskas (9)	LeBron James (9)	Amway Arena; 17,461	1–2
4	May 26	@ Orlando	L 114–116 (OT)	LeBron James (44)	LeBron James (12)	James, West (7)	Amway Arena; 17,461	1–3
5	May 28	Orlando	W 112–102	LeBron James (37)	LeBron James (14)	LeBron James (12)	Quicken Loans Arena; 20,562	2–3
6	May 30	@ Orlando	L 90–103	LeBron James (25)	Anderson Varejão (8)	LeBron James (7)	Amway Arena; 17,461	2–4

2009 schedule

== Player statistics ==
=== Legend ===
Legend
GP	Games played	GS	Games started	MPG	Minutes per game
FG%	Field-goal percentage	3P%	3-point field-goal percentage	FT%	Free-throw percentage
RPG	Rebounds per game	APG	Assists per game	SPG	Steals per game
BPG	Blocks per game	PPG	Points per game	Source:

=== Season ===
Player	GP	GS	MPG	FG%	3P%	FT%	RPG	APG	SPG	BPG	PPG
Daniel Gibson	75	0	23.9	.391	.382	.767	2.1	1.8	.6	.2	7.8
J.J. Hickson	62	0	11.4	.515	.000	.672	2.7	.1	.2	.5	4.0
Žydrūnas Ilgauskas	65	65	24.2	.472	.385	.799	7.5	1.0	.4	1.3	12.9
Darnell Jackson	51	2	8.4	.430	.000	.686	1.7	.2	.2	.1	1.9
LeBron James	81	81	37.7	.489	.344	.780	7.6	7.2	1.7	1.1	28.4
Tarence Kinsey	50	3	5.5	.449	.389	.868	.8	.2	.2	.0	1.0
Sasha Pavlovic	66	12	12.8	.422	.410	.463	1.9	1.1	.3	.2	4.6
Joe Smith	21	0	19.6	.496	.333	.750	4.8	.8	.3	.7	6.5
Wally Szczerbiak	74	5	18.6	.450	.411	.849	3.1	1.1	.4	.1	7.0
Anderson Varejão	81	42	28.5	.536	.000	.616	7.2	1.0	.9	.8	8.6
Ben Wallace	56	53	23.5	.445	.000	.422	6.5	.8	.9	1.3	2.9
Delonte West	64	64	33.6	.457	.399	.833	3.2	3.5	1.5	.2	11.7
Jawad Williams	10	0	2.0	.417	.333	.000	.2	.0	.1	.0	1.2
Mo Williams	81	81	35.0	.467	.436	.912	3.4	4.1	.9	.1	17.8
Lorenzen Wright	18	2	6.9	.370	.000	.375	1.4	.2	.2	.3	1.3

=== Playoffs ===
Player	GP	GS	MPG	FG%	3P%	FT%	RPG	APG	SPG	BPG	PPG
Daniel Gibson	14	0	12.3	.325	.357	1.000	.5	.4	.1	.2	3.4
Žydrūnas Ilgauskas	14	14	29.1	.449	.154	.636	7.8	1.2	.4	.9	10.5
LeBron James	14	14	41.4	.510	.333	.749	9.1	7.3	1.6	.9	35.3
Tarence Kinsey	9	0	1.2	.333	.	1.000	.2	.0	.1	.0	.4
Sasha Pavlovic	11	0	8.3	.500	.250	.463	1.4	.4	.4	.0	2.1
Joe Smith	13	0	16.8	.460	.600	.793	3.7	.2	.5	.5	5.5
Wally Szczerbiak	12	0	12.8	.444	.167	.818	2.3	.6	.2	.1	3.6
Anderson Varejão	14	14	30.0	.500	.	.682	6.4	.6	1.3	1.1	6.9
Ben Wallace	14	0	12.6	.615	.	.000	2.7	.3	.3	.3	1.1
Delonte West	14	14	42.2	.465	.333	.833	3.5	4.1	1.4	.5	13.8
Mo Williams	14	14	38.6	.408	.372	.767	3.2	4.1	.7	.1	16.3

== Awards and records ==
=== Awards ===
- LeBron James was named the Eastern Conference Player of the Week for games played from November 3 through November 9.
- LeBron James was named the Eastern Conference Player of the Week for games played from November 10 through November 16.
- LeBron James was named Eastern Conference Player of the Month for November 2008.
- LeBron James was named the Eastern Conference Player of the Week for games played from December 22 through December 28.
- Mike Brown was named Eastern Conference Coach of the Month for December 2008.
- Mike Brown was named NBA Coach of the Year for the 2008–2009 season.
- LeBron James was named the NBA Most Valuable Player for the 2008–2009 NBA regular season.

=== Milestones ===
- On November 18, LeBron James became the youngest player to reach 11,000 career points and the only player to score 11,000 points in a Cavaliers uniform; he also passed Jim Brewer for 6th in defensive rebounds in Cavs history.
- On December 9, LeBron James passed Mark Price to become the Cavaliers' all-time steals leader.
- On the same night, Zydrunas Ilgauskas passed Brad Daugherty to become the Cavaliers' all-time rebounds leader.
- On January 4, LeBron James passed Brad Daugherty to become the Cavaliers' all-time free throws attempted leader. On the same night he also passed Wesley Person for 2nd all time in three-point field goals made.
- On January 23, LeBron James passed Brad Daugherty to become the Cavaliers' all-time free throws made leader.
- On January 30, Mike Brown became just the second Cleveland coach to coach the Eastern Conference all-star team.
- On February 3, LeBron James became the youngest player to reach 12,000 career points.
- On March 21, Zydrunas Ilgauskas became the fourth Cavalier to reach 10,000 career points.
- On March 22, Zydrunas Ilgauskas passed John "Hot Rod" Williams to become the Cavaliers' all-time blocks leader.
- On March 25, LeBron James became only the second player in NBA history to record 2,000 points, 500 rebounds and 500 assists in at least 4 seasons.
- On March 31, Zydrunas Ilgauskas became only the third player to play at least 700 games as a Cavalier.

== Transactions ==
=== Trades ===
August 13, 2008	To Milwaukee Bucks----Damon Jones----To Oklahoma City Thunder----Joe Smith	To Cleveland Cavaliers----Mo Williams

=== Free agents ===
March 5, 2009: Acquired Joe Smith from Oklahoma City Thunder
