= 2008–09 Orlando Magic season =

NBA professional basketball team season

- Conference champions
- Division champions
- Head coach: Stan Van Gundy
- President: Bob Vander Weide
- General manager: Otis Smith
- Owner: Richard DeVos
- Arena: Amway Arena

Results
- Record: 59–23 (.720)
- Place: Division: 1st (Southeast); Conference: 3rd (Eastern)
- Playoff finish: NBA Finals (lost to Lakers 1–4)
- Stats at Basketball Reference

Local media
- Television: Fox Sports Florida; Sun Sports
- Radio: WDBO

The 2008–09 Orlando Magic season was the 20th season of the franchise in the National Basketball Association (NBA). Led by 23-year-old center Dwight Howard, the team finished the regular season with a 59–23 record, the most wins since the 1995–96 season. The Magic would go on to defeat the Philadelphia 76ers in six games in the first round of the playoffs, highlighted by forward Hedo Türkoğlu's game winner in game four of that series. They followed it up by defeating the defending NBA champion Boston Celtics in a tough, hard-fought seven-game series in the semi-finals. Finally, they defeated the top-seeded Cleveland Cavaliers in six games in the conference finals, thanks to Howard's 40 points and 10 rebounds in Game 6, to advance to the NBA Finals for the first time since 1995, but would lose to the Kobe Bryant-led Los Angeles Lakers in five games.

Following the season, Türkoğlu was traded to the Toronto Raptors in a three-team deal and Rafer Alston, Tony Battie and Courtney Lee were all dealt to the New Jersey Nets. It was also Tyronn Lue’s last season as an NBA player, as 6 years later, he would return to the NBA, as head coach of the Cleveland Cavaliers. As of 2026, this is the last time the Magic have advanced to the NBA Finals.

== Key dates ==
- June 26: The 2008 NBA draft took place in New York City.
- July 1: The free agency period started.
- October 29: The Magic opened the season with a game against the Atlanta Hawks.
- December 12: Because of a sore left knee, Dwight Howard missed the first game of his professional career, ending a streak of 351 consecutive games played in.
- January 13: The Magic scored an NBA record 23 three-pointers against the Sacramento Kings. Nine of the twelve Magic players who played that night scored at least one three pointer: Jameer Nelson (5), JJ Redick (4), Keith Bogans (4), Hedo Türkoğlu (3), Rashard Lewis (3), Courtney Lee (1), Anthony Johnson (1), Brian Cook (1), and Jeremy Richardson (1).
- February 2: Jameer Nelson left a game after dislocating his right shoulder. One day later, it was announced that he suffered a torn labrum, and would require surgery to repair it, meaning he would likely miss the rest of the season. A few days prior to the injury, Nelson had been named as a reserve in the All-Star Game.
- February 19: As part of a three-way trade, the Magic acquired Rafer Alston from the Houston Rockets.
- February 25: The Magic were assured a winning season after defeating the New York Knicks.
- March 11: The Magic clinched a playoff spot with a win over the Chicago Bulls.
- March 25: After beating the Boston Celtics, the Magic clinched their second consecutive division championship. With the win, they were also guaranteed of finishing the regular season with more wins than the previous season.
- April 15: The regular season ended, with the Magic finishing one win shy of matching a franchise record.
- April 21: Dwight Howard won the NBA Defensive Player of the Year Award, becoming the youngest player to win the award as well as the first player of the Magic to do so.
- April 28: Rookie Courtney Lee was accidentally hit in the face by Dwight Howard during game 5 of the Magic's first round playoff series. The following day it was announced he would miss Game 6, suffering a fractured sinus.
- April 29: Dwight Howard was suspended for one game by the NBA for an incident in which Howard elbowed a Philadelphia 76ers player in the face the previous night in Game 5 of the Magic's first round playoff series.
- April 30: The Magic advanced to the second round of the NBA playoffs after defeating the Philadelphia 76ers in 6 games.
- May 17: In a Game 7 on the road, the Magic advanced to their first Eastern Conference finals appearance since 1996 after defeating the defending champion Boston Celtics.
- May 30: The Magic defeated the Cleveland Cavaliers 4–2 to advance to the 2009 NBA Finals and made their first appearance since 1995.
- June 9: The Magic earned their first NBA Finals game victory in franchise history. They beat the Los Angeles Lakers in Game 3 at Amway Arena by a score of 108–104. The Magic shot an NBA Finals single-game record 75% in the first half, and a record 62.5% for the entire game. The Magic had lost their first six NBA Finals games (four in 1995 and two in 2009).
- June 14: The Magic's season ended, having lost the NBA Finals in five games to the Lakers.

== Offseason ==
=== Draft picks ===
Round	Pick	Player	Position	Nationality	College
1	22	Courtney Lee	Shooting guard	American	Western Kentucky

== Roster ==
2008–09 Orlando Magic roster
Players

Pos.	No.	Player	Height	Weight	DOB	From
PG	1	Rafer Alston	6 ft 2 in (1.88 m)	175 lb (79 kg)	1976-07-24	Fresno State
PF	4	Tony Battie	6 ft 11 in (2.11 m)	240 lb (109 kg)	1976-02-11	Texas Tech
C	31	Adonal Foyle	6 ft 10 in (2.08 m)	270 lb (122 kg)	1975-03-09	Colgate
PF	13	Marcin Gortat	6 ft 11 in (2.11 m)	240 lb (109 kg)	1984-02-17	Poland
C	12	Dwight Howard	6 ft 11 in (2.11 m)	265 lb (120 kg)	1985-12-08	SW Atlanta Christian Academy HS (GA)
PG	8	Anthony Johnson	6 ft 3 in (1.91 m)	195 lb (88 kg)	1974-10-02	College of Charleston
SG	11	Courtney Lee	6 ft 5 in (1.96 m)	200 lb (91 kg)	1985-10-03	Western Kentucky
PF	9	Rashard Lewis	6 ft 10 in (2.08 m)	230 lb (104 kg)	1979-08-08	Alief Elsik HS (TX)
PG	10	Tyronn Lue	6 ft 0 in (1.83 m)	175 lb (79 kg)	1977-05-03	Nebraska
PG	14	Jameer Nelson	6 ft 0 in (1.83 m)	190 lb (86 kg)	1982-02-09	Saint Joseph's
SG	20	Mickaël Piétrus	6 ft 6 in (1.98 m)	215 lb (98 kg)	1982-02-07	France
SG	7	JJ Redick	6 ft 4 in (1.93 m)	190 lb (86 kg)	1984-06-24	Duke
SF	32	Jeremy Richardson	6 ft 7 in (2.01 m)	195 lb (88 kg)	1984-02-11	Delta State
SF	15	Hedo Türkoğlu	6 ft 10 in (2.08 m)	220 lb (100 kg)	1979-03-19	Turkey

Coaches
Head coach
- Stan Van Gundy
Assistant(s)
- Bob Beyer
- Steve Clifford
- Patrick Ewing
- Brendan Malone

Legend
- (DP) Unsigned draft pick
- (FA) Free agent
- (S) Suspended
- Injured

Roster
Updated: March 23, 2009

== Regular season ==
The first half of the 2008–09 season went very well for the Magic. After 41 games, the Magic were 33–8, leading the Southeast Division, as well as having one of the top four records in the league. On January 13, 2009, they scored an NBA record 23 three-pointers against the Sacramento Kings. Nine of the twelve Magic players who played that night scored at least one three pointer. At the start of February, Jameer Nelson, their all-star starting point guard, went down with a shoulder injury which caused him to miss the remainder of the season. The Magic then began a stretch where they did not win or lose consecutive games for almost the entire month. The Magic did make a deal at the trade deadline with the Houston Rockets for Rafer Alston. Still having to deal with the absence of Nelson though, Orlando managed to maintain one of the top records in the league, secured a second straight winning season, and clinched a playoff berth in mid-March. The Magic defeated the defending champion Boston Celtics to capture their second consecutive division championship, and on the same night assured themselves of winning more games than the previous season. Finishing the regular season with a 59–23 record, it was the most games the team had won in a season since the 1995–96 season in which they had 60 wins.

=== Standings ===
Southeast Division	W	L	PCT	GB	Home	Road	Div	GP
y-Orlando Magic	59	23	.720	—	32–9	27–14	14–2	82
x-Atlanta Hawks	47	35	.573	12	31–10	16–25	11–5	82
x-Miami Heat	43	39	.524	16	28–13	15–26	9–7	82
Charlotte Bobcats	35	47	.427	24	23–18	12–29	5–11	82
Washington Wizards	19	63	.232	40	13–28	6–35	1–15	82

#	Eastern Conference				
#	Team	W	L	PCT	GB
1	z-Cleveland Cavaliers	66	16	.805	—
2	y-Boston Celtics	62	20	.756	4
3	y-Orlando Magic	59	23	.720	7
4	x-Atlanta Hawks	47	35	.573	19
5	x-Miami Heat	43	39	.524	23
6	x-Philadelphia 76ers	41	41	.500	25
7	x-Chicago Bulls	41	41	.500	25
8	x-Detroit Pistons	39	43	.476	27
9	Indiana Pacers	36	46	.439	30
10	Charlotte Bobcats	35	47	.427	31
11	New Jersey Nets	34	48	.415	32
12	Milwaukee Bucks	34	48	.415	32
13	Toronto Raptors	33	49	.402	33
14	New York Knicks	32	50	.390	34
15	Washington Wizards	19	63	.232	47

=== Game log ===
2008–09 game log
October: 0–2 (home: 0–1; road: 0–1)

Game	Date	Team	Score	High points	High rebounds	High assists	Location Attendance	Record
1	October 29	Atlanta	L 85–99	Dwight Howard (22)	Dwight Howard (15)	Anthony Johnson (3)	Amway Arena; 17,461	0–1
2	October 31	@ Memphis	L 84–86	Rashard Lewis (23)	Dwight Howard (14)	Hedo Türkoğlu (7)	FedExForum; 16,139	0–2

November: 13–2 (home: 7–2; road: 6–0)

Game	Date	Team	Score	High points	High rebounds	High assists	Location Attendance	Record
3	November 1	Sacramento	W 121–103	Dwight Howard (29)	Dwight Howard (14)	Rashard Lewis (6)	Amway Arena; 16,704	1–2
4	November 3	Chicago	W 96–93	Dwight Howard (22)	Dwight Howard (15)	Hedo Türkoğlu (7)	Amway Arena; 15,606	2–2
5	November 6	Philadelphia	W 98–88	Rashard Lewis, Hedo Türkoğlu (20)	Rashard Lewis, Hedo Türkoğlu, Dwight Howard (8)	Jameer Nelson (9)	Amway Arena; 16,407	3–2
6	November 8	Washington	W 106–81	Dwight Howard (31)	Dwight Howard (16)	Jameer Nelson (6)	Amway Arena; 16,911	4–2
7	November 10	Portland	L 99–106	Hedo Türkoğlu (35)	Dwight Howard (19)	Jameer Nelson (7)	Amway Arena; 14,210	4–3
8	November 12	@ Oklahoma City	W 109–92	Dwight Howard (30)	Dwight Howard (19)	Hedo Türkoğlu (7)	Ford Center; 18,185	5–3
9	November 14	@ Dallas	W 102–100	Rashard Lewis (23)	Dwight Howard (13)	Anthony Johnson (6)	American Airlines Center; 20,085	6–3
10	November 16	@ Charlotte	W 90–85	Hedo Türkoğlu (20)	Tony Battie, Dwight Howard (7)	Hedo Türkoğlu (4)	Time Warner Cable Arena; 12,639	7–3
11	November 18	Toronto	W 103–90	Rashard Lewis, Hedo Türkoğlu, Jameer Nelson (22)	Dwight Howard (9)	Hedo Türkoğlu (7)	Amway Arena; 16,353	8–3
12	November 21	@ Indiana	W 100–98 (OT)	Dwight Howard (24)	Dwight Howard (17)	Jameer Nelson (9)	Conseco Fieldhouse; 14,699	9–3
13	November 22	Houston	L 95–100	Jameer Nelson (21)	Dwight Howard (9)	Jameer Nelson (6)	Amway Arena; 17,461	9–4
14	November 24	Milwaukee	W 108–101	Dwight Howard (24)	Dwight Howard (13)	Jameer Nelson (6)	Amway Arena; 16,245	10–4
15	November 26	@ Philadelphia	W 96–94	Dwight Howard (21)	Dwight Howard (14)	Hedo Türkoğlu (7)	Wachovia Center; 14,985	11–4
16	November 27	@ Washington	W 105–90	Dwight Howard (26)	Dwight Howard (14)	Anthony Johnson (12)	Verizon Center; 13,295	12–4
17	November 29	Indiana	W 110–96	Dwight Howard (32)	Dwight Howard (21)	Anthony Johnson, JJ Redick (4)	Amway Arena; 17,172	13–4

December: 12–3 (home: 6–0; road: 6–3)

Game	Date	Team	Score	High points	High rebounds	High assists	Location Attendance	Record
18	December 1	@ Boston	L 88–107	Rashard Lewis (30)	Dwight Howard (15)	Hedo Türkoğlu, Anthony Johnson (4)	TD Banknorth Garden; 18,624	13–5
19	December 3	Minnesota	W 100–89	Rashard Lewis, Dwight Howard (23)	Dwight Howard (14)	Rashard Lewis (5)	Amway Arena; 15,705	14–5
20	December 5	Oklahoma City	W 98–89	Dwight Howard (21)	Dwight Howard (23)	Jameer Nelson, Hedo Türkoğlu (7)	Amway Arena; 16,812	15–5
21	December 8	@ L.A. Clippers	W 95–88	Dwight Howard (23)	Dwight Howard (22)	Hedo Türkoğlu (6)	Staples Center; 15,222	16–5
22	December 9	@ Portland	W 109–108	Rashard Lewis (27)	Rashard Lewis (9)	Jameer Nelson (6)	Rose Garden; 20,642	17–5
23	December 12	@ Phoenix	L 112–113	Dwight Howard (19)	Rashard Lewis (8)	Jameer Nelson, Anthony Johnson (6)	US Airways Center; 18,422	17–6
24	December 13	@ Utah	W 103–94	Rashard Lewis (27)	Rashard Lewis (9)	Jameer Nelson (6)	EnergySolutions Arena; 19,911	18–6
25	December 15	@ Golden State	W 109–98	Jameer Nelson (32)	Marcin Gortat (13)	Hedo Türkoğlu (8)	Oracle Arena; 18,844	19–6
26	December 18	San Antonio	W 90–78	Jameer Nelson (24)	Dwight Howard (13)	Jameer Nelson (7)	Amway Arena; 17,461	20–6
27	December 20	L.A. Lakers	W 106–103	Jameer Nelson (27)	Dwight Howard (12)	Hedo Türkoğlu (7)	Amway Arena; 17,461	21–6
28	December 22	Golden State	W 113–81	Jameer Nelson (22)	Dwight Howard (11)	Jameer Nelson, Hedo Türkoğlu (7)	Amway Arena; 17,461	22–6
29	December 25	New Orleans	W 88–68	Hedo Türkoğlu (20)	Dwight Howard (15)	Hedo Türkoğlu (5)	Amway Arena; 17,461	23–6
30	December 27	@ Minnesota	W 118–94	Hedo Türkoğlu (26)	Hedo Türkoğlu, Rashard Lewis (7)	Jameer Nelson (8)	Target Center; 17,003	24–6
31	December 29	@ Detroit	L 82–88	Rashard Lewis (23)	Dwight Howard (18)	Hedo Türkoğlu (8)	The Palace of Auburn Hills; 22,076	24–7
32	December 31	@ Chicago	W 113–94	Rashard Lewis (21)	Dwight Howard (14)	Jameer Nelson (5)	United Center; 21,861	25–7

January: 10–3 (home: 5–1; road: 5–2)

Game	Date	Team	Score	High points	High rebounds	High assists	Location Attendance	Record
33	January 2	Miami	W 86–76	Rashard Lewis (17)	Dwight Howard (15)	Jameer Nelson, Hedo Türkoğlu (5)	Amway Arena; 17,461	26–7
34	January 4	@ Toronto	L 102–108	Dwight Howard (39)	Dwight Howard (8)	Rashard Lewis (9)	Air Canada Centre; 19,322	26–8
35	January 6	Washington	W 89–80	Hedo Türkoğlu (22)	Dwight Howard (16)	Hedo Türkoğlu (7)	Amway Arena; 16,011	27–8
36	January 7	@ Atlanta	W 106–102	Dwight Howard (23)	Dwight Howard (19)	Hedo Türkoğlu (8)	Philips Arena; 13,748	28–8
37	January 9	Atlanta	W 121–87	Hedo Türkoğlu (21)	Marcin Gortat (11)	Jameer Nelson (9)	Amway Arena; 17,461	29–8
38	January 11	@ San Antonio	W 105–98	Dwight Howard (24)	Dwight Howard (14)	Jameer Nelson, Hedo Türkoğlu (5)	AT&T Center; 18,216	30–8
39	January 13	@ Sacramento	W 139–107	Dwight Howard (25)	Dwight Howard (15)	Jameer Nelson (11)	ARCO Arena; 11,168	31–8
40	January 16	@ L.A. Lakers	W 109–103	Jameer Nelson (28)	Dwight Howard (20)	Jameer Nelson (8)	Staples Center; 18,997	32–8
41	January 17	@ Denver	W 106–88	Hedo Türkoğlu (31)	Dwight Howard (20)	Hedo Türkoğlu, Jameer Nelson (5)	Pepsi Center; 19,749	33–8
42	January 22	Boston	L 80–90	Hedo Türkoğlu (22)	Dwight Howard (11)	Jameer Nelson (3)	Amway Arena; 17,461	33–9
43	January 24	@ Miami	L 97–103	Dwight Howard (22)	Dwight Howard (10)	Jameer Nelson (7)	American Airlines Arena; 19,600	33–10
44	January 27	Indiana	W 135–111	Mickaël Piétrus (27)	Mickaël Piétrus, Dwight Howard (10)	Jameer Nelson, Hedo Türkoğlu (8)	Amway Arena; 17,461	34–10
45	January 29	Cleveland	W 99–88	Dwight Howard (22)	Dwight Howard (18)	Rashard Lewis (5)	Amway Arena; 17,461	35–10

February: 8–6 (home: 4–3; road: 4–3)

Game	Date	Team	Score	High points	High rebounds	High assists	Location Attendance	Record
46	February 1	@ Toronto	W 113–90	Dwight Howard (29)	Dwight Howard (14)	Jameer Nelson (10)	Air Canada Centre; 19,800	36–10
47	February 2	Dallas	L 95–105	Dwight Howard (35)	Dwight Howard (11)	Hedo Türkoğlu (4)	Amway Arena; 16,551	36–11
48	February 4	L.A. Clippers	W 125–96	Anthony Johnson (25)	Dwight Howard (15)	Hedo Türkoğlu (6)	Amway Arena; 16,101	37–11
49	February 6	@ Indiana	L 102–107	Dwight Howard (21)	Dwight Howard (20)	Hedo Türkoğlu (11)	Conseco Fieldhouse; 13,559	37–12
50	February 8	New Jersey	W 101–84	Dwight Howard (30)	Dwight Howard (16)	Hedo Türkoğlu (8)	Amway Arena; 16,533	38–12
51	February 11	Denver	L 73–82	Dwight Howard (16)	Dwight Howard (15)	Hedo Türkoğlu (5)	Amway Arena; 17,461	38–13
52	February 17	Charlotte	W 107–102 (OT)	Dwight Howard (45)	Dwight Howard (19)	Hedo Türkoğlu (7)	Amway Arena; 17,461	39–13
53	February 18	@ New Orleans	L 85–117	Rashard Lewis (17)	Marcin Gortat, Dwight Howard (8)	Rashard Lewis (8)	New Orleans Arena; 16,651	39–14
54	February 20	@ Charlotte	W 92–80	Hedo Türkoğlu (24)	Dwight Howard (16)	Rafer Alston (8)	Time Warner Cable Arena; 19,244	40–14
55	February 22	Miami	W 122–99	Dwight Howard (32)	Dwight Howard (17)	Rafer Alston (9)	Amway Arena; 17,461	41–14
56	February 24	@ Chicago	L 102–120	Dwight Howard (26)	Dwight Howard (12)	Rashard Lewis, Rafer Alston (5)	United Center; 21,902	41–15
57	February 25	@ New York	W 114–109	Hedo Türkoğlu (33)	Dwight Howard (21)	Rashard Lewis (4)	Madison Square Garden; 19,763	42–15
58	February 27	Detroit	L 85–93	Dwight Howard (21)	Dwight Howard (13)	Rafer Alston (6)	Amway Arena; 17,461	42–16
59	February 28	@ Philadelphia	W 106–100	Rashard Lewis, Hedo Türkoğlu (23)	Dwight Howard (8)	Hedo Türkoğlu (7)	Wachovia Center; 19,703	43–16

March: 12–2 (home: 7–0; road: 5–2)

Game	Date	Team	Score	High points	High rebounds	High assists	Location Attendance	Record
60	March 3	Phoenix	W 111–99	Rashard Lewis (29)	Rashard Lewis (12)	Hedo Türkoğlu, Rafer Alston (6)	Amway Arena; 17,461	44–16
61	March 6	New Jersey	W 105–102	Dwight Howard (26)	Dwight Howard (15)	Rafer Alston (6)	Amway Arena; 17,461	45–16
62	March 8	@ Boston	W 86–79	Dwight Howard (18)	Dwight Howard (15)	Rafer Alston (8)	TD Banknorth Garden; 18,624	46–16
63	March 9	@ Detroit	L 94–98	Dwight Howard (27)	Dwight Howard (14)	Rafer Alston (5)	The Palace of Auburn Hills; 20,039	46–17
64	March 11	Chicago	W 107–79	Tony Battie (18)	Marcin Gortat (15)	Rafer Alston, Anthony Johnson (6)	Amway Arena; 17,461	47–17
65	March 13	@ Washington	W 112–103	Mickaël Piétrus (21)	Dwight Howard (13)	Dwight Howard (7)	Verizon Center; 18,152	48–17
66	March 15	Utah	W 105–87	Dwight Howard (28)	Dwight Howard (20)	Hedo Türkoğlu (8)	Amway Arena; 17,461	49–17
67	March 17	@ Cleveland	L 93–97	Rafer Alston (23)	Dwight Howard (15)	Hedo Türkoğlu (7)	Quicken Loans Arena; 20,562	49–18
68	March 18	@ Milwaukee	W 106–80	Dwight Howard (28)	Dwight Howard (12)	Dwight Howard, Hedo Türkoğlu (7)	Bradley Center; 13,819	50–18
69	March 21	New York	W 110–103	Rashard Lewis (27)	Marcin Gortat (8)	Hedo Türkoğlu (9)	Amway Arena; 17,461	51–18
70	March 23	@ New York	W 106–102	Dwight Howard (29)	Dwight Howard (14)	Hedo Türkoğlu (3)	Madison Square Garden; 19,763	52–18
71	March 25	Boston	W 84–82	Dwight Howard (24)	Dwight Howard (21)	Rafer Alston (6)	Amway Arena; 17,461	53–18
72	March 27	Milwaukee	W 110–94	Rashard Lewis (19)	Marcin Gortat (11)	Dwight Howard, Rafer Alston (5)	Amway Arena; 17,461	54–18
73	March 30	@ Miami	W 101–95	Dwight Howard (22)	Dwight Howard (18)	Hedo Türkoğlu, Rafer Alston (5)	American Airlines Arena; 19,600	55–18

April: 4–5 (home: 3–2; road: 1–3)

Game	Date	Team	Score	High points	High rebounds	High assists	Location Attendance	Record
74	April 1	Toronto	L 95–99	Dwight Howard (30)	Dwight Howard (9)	Hedo Türkoğlu (6)	Amway Arena; 17,461	55–19
75	April 3	Cleveland	W 116–87	Rashard Lewis (22)	Dwight Howard (11)	Rafer Alston (10)	Amway Arena; 17,461	56–19
76	April 4	@ Atlanta	W 88–82	Dwight Howard (21)	Dwight Howard (23)	Dwight Howard (5)	Philips Arena; 19,608	57–19
77	April 7	@ Houston	L 83–93	Rashard Lewis (22)	Rashard Lewis (12)	Rashard Lewis, Hedo Türkoğlu (4)	Toyota Center; 18,389	57–20
78	April 8	Memphis	W 81–78	Hedo Türkoğlu (20)	Dwight Howard (13)	Hedo Türkoğlu (7)	Amway Arena; 17,461	58–20
79	April 10	New York	L 95–105	Hedo Türkoğlu (24)	Dwight Howard (14)	Hedo Türkoğlu, Rafer Alston (5)	Amway Arena; 17,461	58–21
80	April 11	@ New Jersey	L 93–103	Hedo Türkoğlu (16)	Dwight Howard (8)	Rafer Alston (8)	Izod Center; 17,123	58–22
81	April 13	@ Milwaukee	L 80–98	Courtney Lee (17)	Marcin Gortat (18)	Rafer Alston (4)	Bradley Center; 14,683	58–23
82	April 15	Charlotte	W 98–73	Tony Battie (21)	Dwight Howard (12)	Mickaël Piétrus (5)	Amway Arena; 17,461	59–23

2015–16 season schedule

== Playoffs ==
The Magic drew the Philadelphia 76ers in the first round of the playoffs. With the series tied at two wins for each team, Game 5 saw Vivani an incident in the 1st quarter involving Dwight Howard throwing an elbow at 76ers center Samuel Dalembert. Howard was assessed a technical foul but was not ejected from the game. The NBA reviewed the play and suspended Howard for Game 6. A second incident involving an elbow from Dwight Howard happened in Game 5 not long after the elbow to Dalembert. This time however, Magic rookie Courtney Lee was the recipient of the hit from his teammate. Lee left the game and did not return. Suffering a fractured sinus, it was announced that Lee was expected to have surgery and could miss the remainder of the postseason. Neither player's absence would prove costly to Orlando in Game 6, who won the series with a blowout on the road, and Lee returned to action in the next series wearing a protective face mask, such as one worn by Richard Hamilton.

In the Eastern Conference semi-finals, the Magic faced the defending champion Boston Celtics. Facing a 3–2 series deficit, the Magic tied the series with a home game victory in Game 6 and advanced to the Eastern Conference finals by winning Game 7 on the road, ending Boston's 32–0 undefeated record when leading the series 3–2. Assistant Coach Patrick Ewing had guaranteed a win in Game 7.

Returning to the conference finals for the first time since 1996, the Magic's opponent was the Cleveland Cavaliers, who compiled the league's best regular season record led by the season's MVP, LeBron James. That didn't stop the Magic as they closed the series out at home in Game 6, winning 103–90 as Dwight Howard scored 40 points, a career high for him in a playoff game. The Magic won the series 4–2, the Eastern Conference championship, and the right to face the Los Angeles Lakers in the 2009 NBA Finals.

After dropping the first two games in the series, the Magic finally won their first ever game in the finals in Game 3. With the franchise losing their first six finals games 1995 and 2009 combined, it was the second most games a team had lost in the finals before earning their first win. However, in Game 4 the Magic lost to the Lakers 99–91 in overtime; the Lakers took a 3–1 series lead and won again in Game 5, thus ending the Magic's longest playoff run in team history and ending up 1–8 in the finals.

=== Game log ===
2009 playoff game log
First Round: 4–2 (home: 2–1; road: 2–1)

Game	Date	Team	Score	High points	High rebounds	High assists	Location Attendance	Series
1	April 19	Philadelphia	L 98–100	Dwight Howard (31)	Dwight Howard (16)	Rafer Alston (5)	Amway Arena; 17,461	0–1
2	April 22	Philadelphia	W 96–87	Courtney Lee (24)	Dwight Howard (10)	Rashard Lewis (6)	Amway Arena; 17,461	1–1
3	April 24	@ Philadelphia	L 94–96	Dwight Howard (36)	Dwight Howard (11)	Courtney Lee (5)	Wachovia Center; 16,492	1–2
4	April 26	@ Philadelphia	W 84–81	Dwight Howard (18)	Dwight Howard (18)	Rafer Alston (5)	Wachovia Center; 16,464	2–2
5	April 28	Philadelphia	W 91–78	Howard, Lewis (24)	Dwight Howard (24)	Alston, Türkoğlu (4)	Amway Arena; 17,461	3–2
6	April 30	@ Philadelphia	W 114–89	Rashard Lewis (29)	Marcin Gortat (15)	Rafer Alston (10)	Wachovia Center; 16,691	4–2

Conference Semifinals: 4–3 (home: 2–1; road: 2–2)

Game	Date	Team	Score	High points	High rebounds	High assists	Location Attendance	Series
1	May 4	@ Boston	W 95–90	Rashard Lewis (18)	Dwight Howard (22)	Rafer Alston (7)	TD Banknorth Garden; 18,624	1–0
2	May 6	@ Boston	L 94–112	Lewis, Piétrus (17)	Dwight Howard (12)	Anthony Johnson (7)	TD Banknorth Garden; 18,624	1–1
3	May 8	Boston	W 117–96	Rashard Lewis (28)	Dwight Howard (14)	Hedo Türkoğlu (4)	Amway Arena; 17,461	2–1
4	May 10	Boston	L 94–95	Dwight Howard (23)	Dwight Howard (17)	JJ Redick (7)	Amway Arena; 17,461	2–2
5	May 12	@ Boston	L 88–92	Rashard Lewis (19)	Dwight Howard (17)	Hedo Türkoğlu (7)	TD Banknorth Garden; 18,624	2–3
6	May 14	Boston	W 83–75	Dwight Howard (23)	Dwight Howard (22)	Alston, Lewis, Türkoğlu (3)	Amway Arena; 17,461	3–3
7	May 17	@ Boston	W 101–82	Hedo Türkoğlu (25)	Dwight Howard (16)	Hedo Türkoğlu (12)	TD Banknorth Garden; 18,624	4–3

Conference Finals: 4–2 (home: 3–0; road: 1–2)

Game	Date	Team	Score	High points	High rebounds	High assists	Location Attendance	Series
1	May 20	@ Cleveland	W 107–106	Dwight Howard (30)	Dwight Howard (13)	Hedo Türkoğlu (14)	Quicken Loans Arena; 20,562	1–0
2	May 22	@ Cleveland	L 95–96	Rashard Lewis (23)	Dwight Howard (18)	Howard, Johnson, Türkoğlu (4)	Quicken Loans Arena; 20,562	1–1
3	May 24	Cleveland	W 99–89	Dwight Howard (24)	Hedo Türkoğlu (10)	Hedo Türkoğlu (7)	Amway Arena; 17,461	2–1
4	May 26	Cleveland	W 116–114 (OT)	Dwight Howard (27)	Dwight Howard (14)	Hedo Türkoğlu (8)	Amway Arena; 17,461	3–1
5	May 28	@ Cleveland	L 102–112	Hedo Türkoğlu (29)	Dwight Howard (10)	Rafer Alston (4)	Quicken Loans Arena; 20,562	3–2
6	May 30	Cleveland	W 103–90	Dwight Howard (40)	Dwight Howard (14)	Hedo Türkoğlu (5)	Amway Arena; 17,461	4–2

NBA Finals: 1–4 (home: 1–2; road: 0–2)

Game	Date	Team	Score	High points	High rebounds	High assists	Location Attendance	Series
1	June 4	@ L.A. Lakers	L 75–100	Mickaël Piétrus (14)	Dwight Howard (15)	Jameer Nelson (4)	Staples Center; 18,997	0–1
2	June 7	@ L.A. Lakers	L 96–101 (OT)	Rashard Lewis (34)	Dwight Howard (16)	Rashard Lewis (7)	Staples Center; 18,997	0–2
3	June 9	L.A. Lakers	W 108–104	Howard, Lewis (21)	Dwight Howard (14)	Hedo Türkoğlu (7)	Amway Arena; 17,461	1–2
4	June 11	L.A. Lakers	L 91–99 (OT)	Hedo Türkoğlu (25)	Dwight Howard (21)	Rashard Lewis (4)	Amway Arena; 17,461	1–3
5	June 14	L.A. Lakers	L 86–99	Rashard Lewis (18)	Howard, Lewis (10)	Lewis, Nelson (4)	Amway Arena; 17,461	1–4

2009 playoff schedule

== Player statistics ==
=== Regular season ===
Player	POS	GP	GS	MP	REB	AST	STL	BLK	PTS	MPG	RPG	APG	SPG	BPG	PPG
Anthony Johnson	PG	80	12	1,481	147	200	46	5	421	18.5	1.8	2.5	.6	.1	5.3
Rashard Lewis	PF	79	79	2,859	453	205	81	51	1,401	36.2	5.7	2.6	1.0	.6	17.7
Dwight Howard	C	79	79	2,821	1,093	112	77	231	1,624	35.7	13.8	1.4	1.0	2.9	20.6
Hedo Türkoğlu	SF	77	77	2,815	410	375	64	19	1,294	36.6	5.3	4.9	.8	.2	16.8
Courtney Lee	SG	77	42	1,939	178	91	76	14	646	25.2	2.3	1.2	1.0	.2	8.4
Tony Battie	PF	77	3	1,202	278	31	26	25	372	15.6	3.6	.4	.3	.3	4.8
JJ Redick	SG	64	5	1,111	109	73	21	1	382	17.4	1.7	1.1	.3	.0	6.0
Marcin Gortat	PF	63	3	794	286	14	18	53	239	12.6	4.5	.2	.3	.8	3.8
Mickaël Piétrus	SG	54	25	1,329	176	65	31	24	510	24.6	3.3	1.2	.6	.4	9.4
Jameer Nelson	PG	42	42	1,309	145	226	51	3	702	31.2	3.5	5.4	1.2	.1	16.7
Keith Bogans^{†}	SG	36	15	787	111	31	23	2	189	21.9	3.1	.9	.6	.1	5.3
Rafer Alston^{†}	PG	29	28	856	83	148	51	3	348	29.5	2.9	5.1	1.8	.1	12.0
Brian Cook^{†}	PF	21	0	146	27	4	3	0	62	7.0	1.3	.2	.1	.0	3.0
Tyronn Lue^{†}	PG	14	0	129	11	14	2	0	42	9.2	.8	1.0	.1	.0	3.0
Jeremy Richardson	SF	12	0	93	14	3	0	0	37	7.8	1.2	.3	.0	.0	3.1
Adonal Foyle^{†}	C	9	0	59	26	1	0	8	17	6.6	2.9	.1	.0	.9	1.9

=== Playoffs ===
Player	POS	GP	GS	MP	REB	AST	STL	BLK	PTS	MPG	RPG	APG	SPG	BPG	PPG
Rashard Lewis	PF	24	24	986	153	70	25	13	455	41.1	6.4	2.9	1.0	.5	19.0
Hedo Türkoğlu	SF	24	24	934	109	116	18	4	378	38.9	4.5	4.8	.8	.2	15.8
Marcin Gortat	PF	24	1	271	76	3	9	15	78	11.3	3.2	.1	.4	.6	3.3
Mickaël Piétrus	SG	24	0	618	62	14	18	13	252	25.8	2.6	.6	.8	.5	10.5
Dwight Howard	C	23	23	903	353	43	20	60	467	39.3	15.3	1.9	.9	2.6	20.3
Rafer Alston	PG	23	23	740	56	94	33	4	281	32.2	2.4	4.1	1.4	.2	12.2
Courtney Lee	SG	21	16	550	39	27	19	3	169	26.2	1.9	1.3	.9	.1	8.0
Tony Battie	PF	21	0	128	20	2	0	3	45	6.1	1.0	.1	.0	.1	2.1
Anthony Johnson	PG	19	1	280	26	39	11	0	82	14.7	1.4	2.1	.6	.0	4.3
JJ Redick	SG	16	8	327	19	31	8	1	96	20.4	1.2	1.9	.5	.1	6.0
Jameer Nelson	PG	5	0	90	7	14	1	0	19	18.0	1.4	2.8	.2	.0	3.8
Adonal Foyle	C	2	0	4	1	0	0	0	0	2.0	.5	.0	.0	.0	.0
Tyronn Lue	PG	1	0	4	0	0	0	0	5	4.0	.0	.0	.0	.0	5.0
Jeremy Richardson	SF	1	0	2	0	0	0	0	0	2.0	.0	.0	.0	.0	.0

- ^{†} Denotes player spent time with another team in the season. Stats reflect time with the Magic only.

== Awards and records ==
- Dwight Howard – Defensive Player of the Year, All-NBA 1st Team, All-Defensive 1st Team, Rebounding Champion, Blocks Champion, All-Star
- Rashard Lewis – All-Star
- Jameer Nelson – All-Star

=== Records ===
- Orlando broke the 3-point record with 23 made 3-pointers on January 13, 2009, in Sacramento.
- Rashard Lewis led the league in 3-point field goals.

== Transactions ==
=== Trades ===
July 11, 2008	To New Jersey Nets----Keyon Dooling	To Orlando Magic----Cash considerations
February 5, 2009	To Milwaukee Bucks----Keith Bogans	To Orlando Magic----Tyronn Lue
February 19, 2009	To Memphis Grizzlies----Orlando 1st round pick (2009); Adonal Foyle (re-signed with Orlando); Mike Wilks	To Houston Rockets----Kyle Lowry; Brian Cook	To Orlando Magic----Rafer Alston

=== Free agents ===
==== Additions ====
Player	Signed	Former team
Mickaël Piétrus	July 9	Golden State Warriors
Anthony Johnson	July 15	Sacramento Kings

==== Subtractions ====
Player	Left	New team
Carlos Arroyo	August 4	Maccabi Tel Aviv
