= Solomon Jones (basketball) =

American basketball player (born 1984)

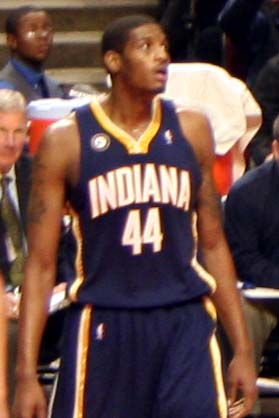
- Jones with the Indiana Pacers in 2009

Personal information
- Born: July 16, 1984 (age 42) Eustis, Florida, U.S.
- Listed height: 6 ft 10 in (2.08 m)
- Listed weight: 245 lb (111 kg)

Career information
- High school: Mount Dora (Mount Dora, Florida)
- College: Daytona State (2002–2004); South Florida (2004–2006)
- NBA draft: 2006: 2nd round, 33rd overall pick
- Drafted by: Atlanta Hawks
- Playing career: 2006–2022
- Position: Power forward / center

Career history
- 2006–2009: Atlanta Hawks
- 2009–2011: Indiana Pacers
- 2012: Los Angeles Clippers
- 2012: New Orleans Hornets
- 2013: Liaoning Flying Leopards
- 2013: New York Knicks
- 2013–2014: Orlando Magic
- 2014: Erie BayHawks
- 2014: Changsha Bank Guangdong
- 2017: Oklahoma City Blue
- 2017: Cañeros del Este
- 2020, 2022: Tijuana Zonkeys
- Stats at NBA.com
- Stats at Basketball Reference

Solomon Jones III (born July 16, 1984) is an American former professional basketball player. He is 6'10" and weighs 235 lb, playing the power forward and center positions. He played his college basketball at Daytona State College for two seasons (2002–2004) and then at the University of South Florida for another two seasons (2004–2006). He was then selected by the Atlanta Hawks with the 33rd overall pick in the 2006 NBA draft.

== Professional career ==
As a rookie, he played in 58 games for the Atlanta Hawks. He averaged 3.3 points a game and 2.3 rebounds a game in 11.5 minutes. After three seasons with the Atlanta Hawks, he signed a two-year deal with the Indiana Pacers.

On January 3, 2012, he signed with the Los Angeles Clippers, but he was later waived on February 7. On February 15, 2012, he signed a 10-day contract with the New Orleans Hornets. On February 27, 2012, he signed a second 10-day contract with the Hornets. In September 2012, Jones signed with the Phoenix Suns. On October 24, 2012, Jones was waived by the Suns. In January 2013, he joined the Liaoning Flying Leopards of the Chinese Basketball Association. On April 12, 2013, Jones signed with the New York Knicks. He was later waived by the Knicks on April 15, 2013.

In September 2013, he signed with the Orlando Magic. On January 4, 2014, he was waived by the Magic.

On February 10, 2014, Jones was acquired by the Erie BayHawks of the NBA D-League. On May 8, 2014, he signed with Changsha Bank Guangdong (a.k.a. Dongguan Snowwolf) of the Chinese National Basketball League.

On September 26, 2015, Jones signed with the Chicago Bulls. However, he was later waived by the Bulls on October 18, 2015. On March 24, 2017, Jones was acquired by the Oklahoma City Blue.

Jones joined Mexican team Tijuana Zonkeys in 2020. His stint was short-lived, as the rest of the season was cancelled due to the COVID-19 pandemic, though he returned to the team for the 2022 season.

=== The Basketball Tournament ===
In 2017, Jones participated in The Basketball Tournament with Tampa Bulls, a team of USF alumni. Jones' team made it to the Sweet 16 where they lost to eventual tournament champion Overseas Elite.

== NBA career statistics ==
Legend
| GP | Games played | GS | Games started | MPG | Minutes per game |
| FG% | Field goal percentage | 3P% | 3-point field goal percentage | FT% | Free throw percentage |
| RPG | Rebounds per game | APG | Assists per game | SPG | Steals per game |
| BPG | Blocks per game | PPG | Points per game | **Bold** | Career high |

=== Regular season ===
| Year | Team | GP | GS | MPG | FG% | 3P% | FT% | RPG | APG | SPG | BPG | PPG |
|---|---|---|---|---|---|---|---|---|---|---|---|---|
| 2006–07 | Atlanta | 58 | **8** | 11.5 | .508 | .000 | .787 | 2.3 | .2 | .2 | **.7** | 3.3 |
| 2007–08 | Atlanta | 35 | 0 | 4.1 | .400 | .000 | .550 | 1.2 | .0 | .1 | .1 | 1.0 |
| 2008–09 | Atlanta | **63** | 0 | 10.7 | **.604** | **.500** | .716 | 2.3 | .2 | .1 | .5 | 3.0 |
| 2009–10 | Indiana | 52 | 2 | 13.0 | .443 | .000 | .718 | 2.8 | .6 | .3 | **.7** | 4.0 |
| 2010–11 | Indiana | 39 | 0 | 13.5 | .405 | .000 | .661 | 2.9 | **.8** | .3 | .6 | 3.6 |
| 2011–12 | L.A. Clippers | 10 | 0 | 9.6 | .125 | .000 | .800 | 1.7 | .2 | .4 | .5 | .6 |
| 2011–12 | New Orleans | 11 | 1 | **17.8** | .434 | .000 | **.833** | **3.7** | .6 | **.5** | .5 | **5.5** |
| 2012–13 | New York | 2 | 1 | 13.0 | .000 | .000 | .000 | 1.5 | .0 | .0 | .5 | .0 |
| 2013–14 | Orlando | 11 | 0 | 7.7 | .353 | .000 | .500 | 1.5 | .2 | .2 | .2 | 1.3 |
| Career | | 281 | 12 | 11.9 | .467 | .111 | .717 | 2.3 | .4 | .2 | .5 | 3.0 |

=== Playoffs ===
| Year | Team | GP | GS | MPG | FG% | 3P% | FT% | RPG | APG | SPG | BPG | PPG |
|---|---|---|---|---|---|---|---|---|---|---|---|---|
| 2008 | Atlanta | 7 | 0 | 4.1 | .200 | .000 | .000 | 1.1 | .1 | **.1** | **.4** | .6 |
| 2009 | Atlanta | **9** | **1** | **8.6** | **.500** | .000 | **1.000** | **1.8** | **.2** | **.1** | .0 | **1.6** |
| Career | | 16 | 1 | 6.6 | .364 | .000 | .500 | 1.5 | .2 | .1 | .2 | 1.1 |
