= Thomas Gardner (basketball) =

American basketball player

Personal information
- Born: February 8, 1985 (age 41) Portland, Oregon, U.S.
- Listed height: 6 ft 5 in (1.96 m)
- Listed weight: 210 lb (95 kg)

Career information
- High school: Jefferson (Portland, Oregon)
- College: Missouri (2003–2006)
- NBA draft: 2006: undrafted
- Playing career: 2006–2012
- Position: Shooting guard

Career history
- 2006–2007: Verviers-Pepinster
- 2007: Chicago Bulls
- 2007–2008: Lokomotiv Rostov
- 2008: Indios de Mayagüez
- 2008–2009: Atlanta Hawks
- 2009: Anaheim Arsenal
- 2009–2010: Antwerp Giants
- 2010–2011: Austin Toros
- 2011: Reno Bighorns
- 2011–2012: Toros de Nuevo Laredo
- Stats at NBA.com
- Stats at Basketball Reference

Thomas Earl Gardner (born February 8, 1985) is an American professional basketball player who played briefly in the National Basketball Association (NBA).

A 6-foot-5-inch (1.96 m) guard, Gardner played three seasons of college basketball at the University of Missouri. He was named to the All-Big 12 Third Team in 2006 after averaging 19.7 points per game in 28 games. After college, he played professionally in Belgium.

Gardner made his NBA debut with the Chicago Bulls on November 15, 2007, scoring two points in five minutes against the Phoenix Suns. On November 20, in what would be his last game as a Bull, Gardner scored a career-high 14 points against Denver. He was waived on December 7, 2007, to make room for Demetris Nichols.

Gardner signed with the Atlanta Hawks in August 2008 after averaging 16.3 points per game in the Rocky Mountain Revue. In September 2009, he joined the Memphis Grizzlies but was waived on October 8, 2009.

On December 28, 2009, he returned to Belgium to sign with the Antwerp Giants.

== NBA career statistics ==
Legend
GP	Games played	GS	Games started	MPG	Minutes per game
FG%	Field goal percentage	3P%	3-point field goal percentage	FT%	Free throw percentage
RPG	Rebounds per game	APG	Assists per game	SPG	Steals per game
BPG	Blocks per game	PPG	Points per game	**Bold**	Career high

=== Regular season ===
Year	Team	GP	GS	MPG	FG%	3P%	FT%	RPG	APG	SPG	BPG	PPG
2007–08	Chicago	4	0	**11.3**	**.391**	**.250**	.000	**1.0**	**.3**	.0	.0	**5.3**
2008–09	Atlanta	**16**	0	6.1	.250	.174	**.500**	.4	.1	**.3**	**.1**	1.5
Career		20	0	7.1	.305	.200	.333	.6	.2	.2	.1	2.3

=== Playoffs ===
Year	Team	GP	GS	MPG	FG%	3P%	FT%	RPG	APG	SPG	BPG	PPG
2008–09	Atlanta	3	0	6.3	.385	.500	1.000	.7	.7	.3	.0	4.7
Career		3	0	6.3	.385	.500	1.000	.7	.7	.3	.0	4.7
