= 2008–09 Charlotte Bobcats season =

NBA professional basketball team season

- Head coach: Larry Brown
- President: Michael Jordan
- General manager: Rod Higgins
- Owner: Robert L. Johnson
- Arena: Time Warner Cable Arena

Results
- Record: 35–47 (.427)
- Place: Division: 4th (Southeast); Conference: 10th (Eastern)
- Playoff finish: Did not qualify
- Stats at Basketball Reference

Local media
- Television: Fox Sports South, SportSouth
- Radio: WOLS

The 2008–09 Charlotte Bobcats season was the 19th season of the NBA basketball in Charlotte in the National Basketball Association (NBA), and their 5th as the Charlotte Bobcats.

The previous season, Charlotte finished 32–50 under coach Sam Vincent, and did not qualify for the playoffs. In response to the dismal season, co-owner and basketball operations chief Michael Jordan fired Vincent and brought in veteran coach Larry Brown. True to his reputation for turning teams around, Brown kept the young team in playoff contention well into April. They ultimately finished four games short of the first playoff appearance in their current incarnation.

== Key dates ==
- June 26: The 2008 NBA draft took place in New York City.
- July 1: The free agency period.
- March 7: Charlotte recorded its longest winning streak in franchise history at 6 following a 114–105 win over the New York Knicks.

== Offseason ==
=== 2008 NBA draft ===
Round	Pick	Player	Nationality	Position	School/Club team
1	9	D. J. Augustin	United States	PG	Texas
1	20	Alexis Ajinça	France	C	Hyères-Toulon (France)
2	38	Kyle Weaver	United States	PG	Washington State

=== Staff changes ===
Michael Jordan fired coach Sam Vincent on April 27, 2008, and subsequently signed legendary coach Larry Brown 2 days later.

== Roster ==
Charlotte Bobcats roster
Players

Pos.	No.	Player	Height	Weight	DOB	From
C	21	Alexis Ajinça	7 ft 0 in (2.13 m)	220 lb (100 kg)		France
G	14	D. J. Augustin	6 ft 0 in (1.83 m)	180 lb (82 kg)		Texas
G	19	Raja Bell	6 ft 5 in (1.96 m)	215 lb (98 kg)		FIU
F	32	Boris Diaw	6 ft 8 in (2.03 m)	235 lb (107 kg)		France
F/C	7	DeSagana Diop	7 ft 0 in (2.13 m)	280 lb (127 kg)		Oak Hill Academy (Virginia)
G	20	Raymond Felton	6 ft 1 in (1.85 m)	198 lb (90 kg)		North Carolina
F	5	Juwan Howard	6 ft 9 in (2.06 m)	250 lb (113 kg)		Michigan
G	2	Dontell Jefferson	6 ft 5 in (1.96 m)	181 lb (82 kg)		Arkansas
G/F	1	Cartier Martin	6 ft 7 in (2.01 m)	220 lb (100 kg)		Kansas State
PF	42	Sean May	6 ft 9 in (2.06 m)	266 lb (121 kg)		North Carolina
C	6	Nazr Mohammed	6 ft 10 in (2.08 m)	250 lb (113 kg)		Kentucky
F/C	50	Emeka Okafor	6 ft 10 in (2.08 m)	255 lb (116 kg)		Connecticut
F	10	Vladimir Radmanović	6 ft 10 in (2.08 m)	234 lb (106 kg)		Serbia
PG	44	Sean Singletary	6 ft 0 in (1.83 m)	185 lb (84 kg)		Virginia
F	3	Gerald Wallace	6 ft 7 in (2.01 m)	220 lb (100 kg)		Alabama

Coaches
Head coach
- Larry Brown (North Carolina)
Assistant(s)
- Herb Brown (Vermont)
- Jeff Capel (Fayetteville State)
- Phil Ford (North Carolina}
- Dave Hanners (North Carolina)
- LaSalle Thompson (Texas)

Legend
- (DP) Unsigned draft pick
- (FA) Free agent
- (S) Suspended
- Injured

== Regular season ==
=== Standings ===
Southeast Division	W	L	PCT	GB	Home	Road	Div	GP
y-Orlando Magic	59	23	.720	—	32–9	27–14	14–2	82
x-Atlanta Hawks	47	35	.573	12	31–10	16–25	11–5	82
x-Miami Heat	43	39	.524	16	28–13	15–26	9–7	82
Charlotte Bobcats	35	47	.427	24	23–18	12–29	5–11	82
Washington Wizards	19	63	.232	40	13–28	6–35	1–15	82

#	Eastern Conference				
#	Team	W	L	PCT	GB
1	z-Cleveland Cavaliers	66	16	.805	—
2	y-Boston Celtics	62	20	.756	4
3	y-Orlando Magic	59	23	.720	7
4	x-Atlanta Hawks	47	35	.573	19
5	x-Miami Heat	43	39	.524	23
6	x-Philadelphia 76ers	41	41	.500	25
7	x-Chicago Bulls	41	41	.500	25
8	x-Detroit Pistons	39	43	.476	27
9	Indiana Pacers	36	46	.439	30
10	Charlotte Bobcats	35	47	.427	31
11	New Jersey Nets	34	48	.415	32
12	Milwaukee Bucks	34	48	.415	32
13	Toronto Raptors	33	49	.402	33
14	New York Knicks	32	50	.390	34
15	Washington Wizards	19	63	.232	47

=== Game log ===
2008–09 game log
October: 0–1 (home: 0–0; road: 0–1)

Game	Date	Team	Score	High points	High rebounds	High assists	Location Attendance	Record
1	October 30	@ Cleveland	L 79–96	Jason Richardson (24)	Emeka Okafor (12)	Raymond Felton (5)	Quicken Loans Arena; 20,562	0–1

November: 5–10 (home: 4–7; road: 1–3)

Game	Date	Team	Score	High points	High rebounds	High assists	Location Attendance	Record
2	November 1	Miami	W 100–87	Gerald Wallace (34)	Emeka Okafor (13)	Raymond Felton (8)	Time Warner Cable Arena; 19,238	1–1
3	November 3	Detroit	L 83–101	Shannon Brown (16)	Gerald Wallace (12)	Jason Richardson (5)	Time Warner Cable Arena; 11,023	1–2
4	November 5	@ New York	L 98–101	Raymond Felton (18)	Emeka Okafor (15)	Raymond Felton (6)	Madison Square Garden; 17,977	1–3
5	November 7	New Orleans	W 92–89	Jason Richardson, Raymond Felton (20)	Emeka Okafor (10)	D. J. Augustin (4)	Time Warner Cable Arena; 13,435	2–3
6	November 9	Toronto	L 79–89	D. J. Augustin (14)	Gerald Wallace (8)	Raymond Felton (6)	Time Warner Cable Arena; 12,111	2–4
7	November 11	Denver	L 80–88	Jason Richardson (23)	Emeka Okafor (8)	Raymond Felton (5)	Time Warner Cable Arena; 10,753	2–5
8	November 14	Utah	W 104–96	Raymond Felton (23)	Gerald Wallace (9)	Raymond Felton (6)	Time Warner Cable Arena; 14,189	3–5
9	November 16	Orlando	L 85–90	Gerald Wallace (19)	Gerald Wallace, Emeka Okafor (9)	Raymond Felton (6)	Time Warner Cable Arena; 12,639	3–6
10	November 18	Dallas	L 83–100	D. J. Augustin (21)	Emeka Okafor (9)	D. J. Augustin (4)	Time Warner Cable Arena; 10,935	3–7
11	November 21	@ Atlanta	L 83–88	D. J. Augustin (26)	Emeka Okafor (11)	D. J. Augustin (7)	Philips Arena; 15,068	3–8
12	November 22	Milwaukee	L 74–79	Gerald Wallace (18)	Emeka Okafor (18)	Raymond Felton (5)	Time Warner Cable Arena; 12,096	3–9
13	November 24	Philadelphia	W 93–84	D. J. Augustin (25)	Emeka Okafor (9)	D. J. Augustin (11)	Time Warner Cable Arena; 10,848	4–9
14	November 26	@ Toronto	L 86–93	Gerald Wallace (23)	Emeka Okafor (14)	Raymond Felton (7)	Air Canada Centre; 17,414	4–10
15	November 28	@ Indiana	W 115–108 (OT)	Raymond Felton (31)	Emeka Okafor (20)	Raymond Felton (7)	Conseco Fieldhouse; 17,160	5–10
16	November 29	Boston	L 84–89	Gerald Wallace (23)	Gerald Wallace (8)	Raymond Felton (6)	Time Warner Cable Arena; 19,177	5–11

December: 6–10 (home: 4–5; road: 2–5)

Game	Date	Team	Score	High points	High rebounds	High assists	Location Attendance	Record
17	December 1	Minnesota	W 100–90	Jason Richardson (25)	Emeka Okafor (10)	Raymond Felton (14)	Time Warner Cable Arena; 9,285	6–11
18	December 3	Oklahoma City	W 103–97	Emeka Okafor (25)	Emeka Okafor (13)	Raymond Felton (12)	Time Warner Cable Arena; 11,629	7–11
19	December 5	@ Milwaukee	L 96–101	Jason Richardson (20)	Emeka Okafor (8)	Raymond Felton (8)	Bradley Center; 14,875	7–12
20	December 6	Cleveland	L 74–94	D. J. Augustin (17)	Emeka Okafor (8)	Raymond Felton (5)	Time Warner Cable Arena; 19,133	7–13
21	December 8	@ Miami	L 96–100	Jason Richardson (24)	Emeka Okafor (12)	Raymond Felton (8)	American Airlines Arena; 15,024	7–14
22	December 10	@ New Orleans	L 89–105	D. J. Augustin (28)	Emeka Okafor (8)	D. J. Augustin (7)	New Orleans Arena; 15,750	7–15
23	December 11	@ Dallas	L 90–95	Emeka Okafor (27)	Emeka Okafor (17)	D. J. Augustin (10)	American Airlines Center; 19,736	7–16
24	December 13	Detroit	L 86–90	Gerald Wallace (22)	Emeka Okafor (12)	Boris Diaw (5)	Time Warner Cable Arena; 17,373	7–17
25	December 15	@ Atlanta	L 79–83	Boris Diaw (25)	Emeka Okafor (11)	Raymond Felton (7)	Philips Arena; 12,733	7–18
26	December 16	Chicago	W 110–101 (OT)	D. J. Augustin (29)	Emeka Okafor (13)	D. J. Augustin, Raymond Felton (7)	Time Warner Cable Arena; 11,225	8–18
27	December 19	@ Memphis	W 112–83	Boris Diaw (26)	Boris Diaw (10)	D. J. Augustin (10)	FedExForum; 11,869	9–18
28	December 20	Golden State	L 103–110	Gerald Wallace (26)	Emeka Okafor (13)	Raymond Felton (8)	Time Warner Cable Arena; 13,068	9–19
29	December 23	Washington	W 80–72	Emeka Okafor (29)	Emeka Okafor (18)	Raymond Felton (8)	Time Warner Cable Arena; 13,776	10–19
30	December 26	@ New Jersey	W 95–87	Raymond Felton (22)	Gerald Wallace (13)	Boris Diaw (7)	Izod Center; 16,852	11–19
31	December 27	New Jersey	L 103–114 (OT)	Gerald Wallace (32)	Emeka Okafor (10)	Boris Diaw (7)	Time Warner Cable Arena; 15,837	11–20
32	December 30	New York	L 89–93	Gerald Wallace (21)	Emeka Okafor (15)	Raymond Felton (8)	Time Warner Cable Arena; 15,108	11–21

January: 8–7 (home: 5–1; road: 3–6)

Game	Date	Team	Score	High points	High rebounds	High assists	Location Attendance	Record
33	January 2	@ Milwaukee	L 75–103	Boris Diaw (16)	Emeka Okafor (12)	Boris Diaw (6)	Bradley Center; 15,107	11–22
34	January 3	Milwaukee	W 102–92	Gerald Wallace (24)	Boris Diaw, Raymond Felton, Emeka Okafor (6)	Boris Diaw (7)	Time Warner Cable Arena; 14,201	12–22
35	January 6	Boston	W 114–106 (OT)	Raymond Felton (25)	Emeka Okafor (17)	Raymond Felton (8)	Time Warner Cable Arena; 17,112	13–22
36	January 7	@ Cleveland	L 81–111	Raymond Felton (15)	Boris Diaw (8)	Boris Diaw (6)	Quicken Loans Arena; 20,562	13–23
37	January 9	@ Philadelphia	L 87–93	Emeka Okafor (24)	Emeka Okafor (11)	Raymond Felton (8)	Wachovia Center; 14,235	13–24
38	January 10	@ Washington	W 92–89	Raja Bell (19)	Emeka Okafor (6)	Raymond Felton (11)	Verizon Center; 20,173	14–24
39	January 13	@ Detroit	W 80–78	Raymond Felton (23)	Gerald Wallace (10)	Raymond Felton (9)	The Palace of Auburn Hills; 22,076	15–24
40	January 17	Portland	W 102–97 (OT)	Gerald Wallace (31)	Gerald Wallace (16)	Raymond Felton, Boris Diaw (7)	Time Warner Cable Arena; 17,482	16–24
41	January 19	San Antonio	L 84–86	Raja Bell (25)	Boris Diaw (13)	Raymond Felton (9)	Time Warner Cable Arena; 16,160	16–25
42	January 21	Memphis	W 101–86	Raja Bell (25)	Emeka Okafor (15)	Gerald Wallace (9)	Time Warner Cable Arena; 11,249	17–25
43	January 23	Phoenix	W 98–76	Gerald Wallace (28)	Boris Diaw (11)	Raja Bell (8)	Time Warner Cable Arena; 19,104	18–25
44	January 25	@ Indiana	L 93–98	Raja Bell, Boris Diaw (18)	Emeka Okafor (8)	Raymond Felton (12)	Conseco Fieldhouse; 10,936	18–26
45	January 27	@ L.A. Lakers	W 117–110 (2OT)	Boris Diaw (23)	Raymond Felton, Emeka Okafor (11)	Boris Diaw, Raymond Felton (9)	Staples Center; 18,997	19–26
46	January 28	@ Portland	L 74–88	Emeka Okafor (18)	Emeka Okafor, Raymond Felton (5)	Raymond Felton (8)	Rose Garden; 20,380	19–27
47	January 30	@ Denver	L 99–110	Raja Bell (27)	DeSagana Diop (7)	Raymond Felton (9)	Pepsi Center; 18,463	19–28

February: 6–7 (home: 3–2; road: 3–5)

Game	Date	Team	Score	High points	High rebounds	High assists	Location Attendance	Record
48	February 2	@ Utah	L 86–105	Raymond Felton (16)	Emeka Okafor (7)	Raymond Felton (9)	EnergySolutions Arena; 19,911	19–29
49	February 6	Atlanta	L 97–102	Raja Bell (17)	Emeka Okafor (19)	Raymond Felton (8)	Time Warner Cable Arena; 15,140	19–30
50	February 8	@ Miami	L 92–96	D. J. Augustin (27)	Emeka Okafor (8)	Raymond Felton (11)	American Airlines Arena; 17,656	19–31
51	February 9	L.A. Clippers	W 94–73	Emeka Okafor (19)	Emeka Okafor (16)	Boris Diaw (9)	Time Warner Cable Arena; 10,852	20–31
52	February 11	Washington	W 101–89	D. J. Augustin (24)	Emeka Okafor (13)	Raymond Felton (9)	Time Warner Cable Arena; 10,237	21–31
53	February 17	@ Orlando	L 102–107 (OT)	Raymond Felton (22)	Raymond Felton (10)	Raymond Felton (5)	Amway Arena; 17,461	21–32
54	February 18	Indiana	W 103–94	Gerald Wallace (25)	Emeka Okafor (12)	Gerald Wallace (7)	Time Warner Cable Arena; 12,374	22–32
55	February 20	Orlando	L 80–92	Raymond Felton (16)	Emeka Okafor (11)	Raymond Felton (5)	Time Warner Cable Arena; 19,244	22–33
56	February 22	@ Houston	L 78–99	Boris Diaw, Emeka Okafor, Raymond Felton (13)	Emeka Okafor (11)	Raymond Felton (4)	Toyota Center; 17,124	22–34
57	February 24	@ Phoenix	L 102–112	Boris Diaw (27)	Boris Diaw (10)	Raymond Felton (9)	US Airways Center; 18,422	22–35
58	February 25	@ Sacramento	W 98–91	Gerald Wallace (27)	Emeka Okafor (11)	Raymond Felton (9)	ARCO Arena; 10,439	23–35
59	February 27	@ Golden State	W 112–109	Raymond Felton (26)	Gerald Wallace, Emeka Okafor (11)	Raymond Felton (9)	Oracle Arena; 18,653	24–35
60	February 28	@ L.A. Clippers	W 100–95	Emeka Okafor (28)	Emeka Okafor, Gerald Wallace (9)	D. J. Augustin (8)	Staples Center; 16,349	25–35

March: 9–5 (home: 6–2; road: 3–3)

Game	Date	Team	Score	High points	High rebounds	High assists	Location Attendance	Record
61	March 3	Chicago	W 96–80	Raymond Felton, Raja Bell (18)	Emeka Okafor (10)	Raymond Felton (9)	Time Warner Cable Arena; 14,216	26–35
62	March 6	Atlanta	W 98–91	Gerald Wallace (21)	Emeka Okafor (11)	Boris Diaw (13)	Time Warner Cable Arena; 15,058	27–35
63	March 7	@ New York	W 114–105	Gerald Wallace (23)	Gerald Wallace (13)	Raymond Felton (10)	Madison Square Garden; 19,763	28–35
64	March 10	@ San Antonio	L 86–100	Emeka Okafor, Raja Bell (16)	DeSagana Diop, Gerald Wallace (7)	Boris Diaw (8)	AT&T Center; 18,254	28–36
65	March 13	Houston	L 86–91	Gerald Wallace (17)	Gerald Wallace, Emeka Okafor (8)	Raymond Felton (8)	Time Warner Cable Arena; 16,809	28–37
66	March 14	@ Minnesota	L 100–108	Gerald Wallace (26)	Gerald Wallace (10)	Raymond Felton (5)	Target Center; 15,276	28–38
67	March 16	Toronto	W 112–86	Gerald Wallace (25)	Vladimir Radmanović, Gerald Wallace (9)	Raymond Felton (8)	Time Warner Cable Arena; 11,349	29–38
68	March 18	Sacramento	W 104–88	Gerald Wallace (25)	Gerald Wallace (12)	Raymond Felton (7)	Time Warner Cable Arena; 13,594	30–38
69	March 20	@ Toronto	W 102–89	Boris Diaw, Gerald Wallace (30)	Gerald Wallace (9)	Gerald Wallace (8)	Air Canada Centre; 18,641	31–38
70	March 21	Indiana	L 83–108	Boris Diaw (15)	Emeka Okafor (9)	Raymond Felton, Gerald Wallace (5)	Time Warner Cable Arena; 15,721	31–39
71	March 25	@ Washington	L 93–95	Gerald Wallace (21)	Gerald Wallace (11)	Raymond Felton (8)	Verizon Center; 14,657	31–40
72	March 27	@ Philadelphia	W 100–95	Boris Diaw (24)	Gerald Wallace (11)	Boris Diaw (6)	Wachovia Center; 19,098	32–40
73	March 28	New York	W 96–85	Gerald Wallace (23)	Emeka Okafor (14)	Gerald Wallace (8)	Time Warner Cable Arena; 19,133	33–40
74	March 31	L.A. Lakers	W 94–84	Gerald Wallace (21)	Gerald Wallace (13)	Boris Diaw (12)	Time Warner Cable Arena; 19,568	34–40

April: 1–7 (home: 1–1; road: 0–6)

Game	Date	Team	Score	High points	High rebounds	High assists	Location Attendance	Record
75	April 1	@ Boston	L 109–111 (2OT)	Gerald Wallace (20)	Gerald Wallace, Emeka Okafor (10)	Raymond Felton (12)	TD Banknorth Garden; 18,624	34–41
76	April 3	Miami	L 92–97	Gerald Wallace (21)	Emeka Okafor (13)	Raymond Felton (10)	Time Warner Cable Arena; 19,568	34–42
77	April 5	@ Detroit	L 97–104	D. J. Augustin (22)	Emeka Okafor (16)	Boris Diaw (6)	The Palace of Auburn Hills; 22,076	34–43
78	April 7	Philadelphia	W 101–98	Raymond Felton (32)	Emeka Okafor (12)	Boris Diaw, D. J. Augustin (6)	Time Warner Cable Arena; 16,499	35–43
79	April 10	@ Oklahoma City	L 81–84	D. J. Augustin (20)	Gerald Wallace (14)	Raymond Felton (5)	Ford Center; 19,136	35–44
80	April 11	@ Chicago	L 106–113	Raymond Felton (26)	Emeka Okafor (14)	D. J. Augustin (8)	United Center; 20,265	35–45
81	April 13	@ New Jersey	L 87–91	Raymond Felton (19)	DeSagana Diop, Boris Diaw, Emeka Okafor (5)	Raymond Felton (5)	Izod Center; 14,519	35–46
82	April 15	@ Orlando	L 73–98	Raymond Felton (13)	Gerald Wallace (10)	Dontell Jefferson (4)	Amway Arena; 17,461	35–47

2015–16 season schedule

== Player statistics ==
=== Ragular season ===
Player	POS	GP	GS	MP	REB	AST	STL	BLK	PTS	MPG	RPG	APG	SPG	BPG	PPG
Raymond Felton	PG	82	81	3,086	310	553	126	30	1,162	37.6	3.8	6.7	1.5	.4	14.2
Emeka Okafor	C	82	81	2,691	827	53	48	136	1,085	32.8	10.1	.6	.6	1.7	13.2
D. J. Augustin	PG	72	12	1,908	133	250	42	2	850	26.5	1.8	3.5	.6	.0	11.8
Gerald Wallace	SF	71	71	2,669	553	189	121	67	1,182	37.6	7.8	2.7	1.7	.9	16.6
Boris Diaw^{†}	PF	59	59	2,216	348	287	50	44	889	37.6	5.9	4.9	.8	.7	15.1
Raja Bell^{†}	SG	45	44	1,603	179	113	37	6	587	35.6	4.0	2.5	.8	.1	13.0
Adam Morrison^{†}	SF	44	5	667	72	38	9	4	199	15.2	1.6	.9	.2	.1	4.5
DeSagana Diop^{†}	C	41	1	584	155	19	17	31	114	14.2	3.8	.5	.4	.8	2.8
Juwan Howard^{†}	SF	39	2	450	72	24	6	5	171	11.5	1.8	.6	.2	.1	4.4
Nazr Mohammed	C	39	1	341	79	8	5	16	104	8.7	2.0	.2	.1	.4	2.7
Matt Carroll^{†}	SG	34	10	475	55	24	18	5	139	14.0	1.6	.7	.5	.1	4.1
Cartier Martin	SF	33	1	266	33	13	8	4	86	8.1	1.0	.4	.2	.1	2.6
Vladimir Radmanović^{†}	SF	32	3	674	105	43	18	8	267	21.1	3.3	1.3	.6	.3	8.3
Alexis Ajinça	PF	31	4	182	30	3	7	6	70	5.9	1.0	.1	.2	.2	2.3
Shannon Brown^{†}	SG	30	0	341	24	28	18	5	144	11.4	.8	.9	.6	.2	4.8
Sean May	PF	24	12	301	69	10	5	4	93	12.5	2.9	.4	.2	.2	3.9
Sean Singletary^{†}	PG	24	1	181	19	17	5	0	56	7.5	.8	.7	.2	.0	2.3
Jared Dudley^{†}	SF	20	7	427	59	19	18	2	108	21.4	3.0	1.0	.9	.1	5.4
Ryan Hollins^{†}	C	18	1	184	36	4	3	17	64	10.2	2.0	.2	.2	.9	3.6
Jason Richardson^{†}	SG	14	14	491	58	36	14	3	262	35.1	4.1	2.6	1.0	.2	18.7
Dontell Jefferson	SG	6	0	84	12	9	4	1	29	14.0	2.0	1.5	.7	.2	4.8
Dwayne Jones	PF	6	0	52	12	0	0	1	12	8.7	2.0	.0	.0	.2	2.0
Andre Brown	PF	4	0	41	12	1	1	0	4	10.3	3.0	.3	.3	.0	1.0
Linton Johnson^{†}	PF	2	0	13	0	0	0	0	0	6.5	.0	.0	.0	.0	.0

- ^{†} Denotes player spent time with another team in the season. Stats reflect time with the Bobcats only.

== Awards, records and milestones ==
NBA All-Rookie Second Team

- D. J. Augustin

== Transactions ==
- On July 7, the Bobcats hired Herb Brown to be an assistant coach. Herb Brown spent the past four seasons as an assistant in Atlanta. Charlotte is the ninth team he's worked for as an assistant. He served as head coach in Pistons for three seasons from 1975 to 1978.
- On July 25, the Bobcats agreed to terms with restricted free agent Ryan Hollins.
- On July 29, the Bobcats agreed to terms with restricted free agent Emeka Okafor. The Charlotte Observer reported the deal is for six years and $72 million.

=== Trades ===
August 12, 2008	To Charlotte Bobcats 2009 2nd Round Selection	To Oklahoma City Thunder Kyle Weaver
December 10, 2008	To Charlotte Bobcats Raja Bell, Boris Diaw, Sean Singletary	To Phoenix Suns Jason Richardson, Jared Dudley, 2010 2nd Round Selection
January 16, 2009	To Charlotte Bobcats DeSagana Diop	To Dallas Mavericks Matt Carroll, Ryan Hollins
February 7, 2009	To Charlotte Bobcats Vladimir Radmanovic	To Los Angeles Lakers Adam Morrison, Shannon Brown

=== Free agents ===
==== Additions ====
Player	Signed	Former team
Shannon Brown	August 6, 2008	Chicago Bulls
Juwan Howard	December 12, 2008	Denver Nuggets

==== Subtractions ====
Player	Left	New team
Othella Harrington	July 1, 2008	
Earl Boykins	August 6, 2008	Virtus Bologna (Italy)
