= 2008–09 Miami Heat season =

NBA professional basketball team season

- Head coach: Erik Spoelstra
- President: Pat Riley
- Owner: Micky Arison
- Arena: American Airlines Arena

Results
- Record: 43–39 (.524)
- Place: Division: 3rd (Southeast); Conference: 5th (Eastern)
- Playoff finish: First Round (lost to Hawks 3–4)
- Stats at Basketball Reference

Local media
- Television: Fox Sports Florida, Sun Sports
- Radio: WIOD

The 2008–09 Miami Heat season was the 21st season of the franchise in the National Basketball Association (NBA).

Following a disastrous 15–67 season, Pat Riley resigned as head coach, and assistant coach Erik Spoelstra was promoted to become the new head coach; he was the youngest NBA head coach at the time of his hiring. With a healthy Dwyane Wade back in the lineup, the Heat greatly improved on their regular season record and returned to the playoffs, but were eliminated in the first round to the Atlanta Hawks in seven games, all of which were decided by double-digit margins.

== Key dates ==
- June 26: The 2008 NBA draft took place in New York City.
- July 1: The free agency period started.
- October 5: The pre-season started with a game against the Detroit Pistons.
- October 29: The regular season started with a game against the New York Knicks.

== Draft picks ==
Round	Pick	Player	Position	Nationality	College
1	2	Michael Beasley	Forward	United States	Kansas State
2	52	Darnell Jackson (traded to the Cleveland Cavaliers for two future second round draft picks)	Forward	United States	Kansas
2	34	Mario Chalmers (traded from Minnesota Timberwolves)	Guard	United States	Kansas

== Roster ==
2008–09 Miami Heat roster
Players

Pos.	No.	Player	Height	Weight	DOB	From
C	50	Joel Anthony	6 ft 9 in (2.06 m)	260 lb (118 kg)	1982-08-09	UNLV
F	30	Michael Beasley	6 ft 10 in (2.08 m)	235 lb (107 kg)	1989-01-09	Kansas State
C	15	Mark Blount	7 ft 0 in (2.13 m)	250 lb (113 kg)	1975-11-30	Pittsburgh
PG	6	Mario Chalmers	6 ft 1 in (1.85 m)	190 lb (86 kg)	1986-05-19	Kansas
G	14	Daequan Cook	6 ft 5 in (1.96 m)	210 lb (95 kg)	1987-04-28	Ohio State
G/F	9	Yakhouba Diawara	6 ft 7 in (2.01 m)	225 lb (102 kg)	1982-08-29	Pepperdine
F/C	40	Udonis Haslem	6 ft 8 in (2.03 m)	235 lb (107 kg)	1980-06-09	Florida
G	13	Luther Head	6 ft 3 in (1.91 m)	185 lb (84 kg)	1982-11-26	Illinois
SF	22	James Jones	6 ft 8 in (2.03 m)	220 lb (100 kg)	1980-10-04	Miami (FL)
C	21	Jamaal Magloire	6 ft 11 in (2.11 m)	265 lb (120 kg)	1978-05-21	Kentucky
SF	8	Jamario Moon	6 ft 8 in (2.03 m)	200 lb (91 kg)	1980-06-13	Meridian CC
C	7	Jermaine O'Neal	6 ft 11 in (2.11 m)	260 lb (118 kg)	1978-10-13	Eau Claire HS
G	11	Chris Quinn	6 ft 2 in (1.88 m)	185 lb (84 kg)	1983-09-27	Notre Dame
SG	3	Dwyane Wade	6 ft 4 in (1.93 m)	212 lb (96 kg)	1982-01-17	Marquette
SF	1	Dorell Wright	6 ft 8 in (2.03 m)	205 lb (93 kg)	1985-12-02	Leuzinger HS

Coaches
Head coach
- Erik Spoelstra
Assistant(s)
- Keith Askins
- David Fizdale
- Bill Foran
- Chet Kammerer
- Bob McAdoo
- Ron Rothstein

Legend
- (DP) Unsigned draft pick
- (FA) Free agent
- (S) Suspended
- Injured

Roster
Updated: March 4, 2009

== Regular season ==
=== Standings ===
Southeast Division	W	L	PCT	GB	Home	Road	Div	GP
y-Orlando Magic	59	23	.720	—	32–9	27–14	14–2	82
x-Atlanta Hawks	47	35	.573	12	31–10	16–25	11–5	82
x-Miami Heat	43	39	.524	16	28–13	15–26	9–7	82
Charlotte Bobcats	35	47	.427	24	23–18	12–29	5–11	82
Washington Wizards	19	63	.232	40	13–28	6–35	1–15	82

#	Eastern Conference				
#	Team	W	L	PCT	GB
1	z-Cleveland Cavaliers	66	16	.805	—
2	y-Boston Celtics	62	20	.756	4
3	y-Orlando Magic	59	23	.720	7
4	x-Atlanta Hawks	47	35	.573	19
5	x-Miami Heat	43	39	.524	23
6	x-Philadelphia 76ers	41	41	.500	25
7	x-Chicago Bulls	41	41	.500	25
8	x-Detroit Pistons	39	43	.476	27
9	Indiana Pacers	36	46	.439	30
10	Charlotte Bobcats	35	47	.427	31
11	New Jersey Nets	34	48	.415	32
12	Milwaukee Bucks	34	48	.415	32
13	Toronto Raptors	33	49	.402	33
14	New York Knicks	32	50	.390	34
15	Washington Wizards	19	63	.232	47

=== Game log ===
2008–09 game log
October: 1–1 (home: 1–0; road: 0–1)

Game	Date	Team	Score	High points	High rebounds	High assists	Location Attendance	Record
1	October 29	@ New York	L 115–120	Dwyane Wade (26)	Shawn Marion (11)	Dwyane Wade (9)	Madison Square Garden; 19,763	0–1
2	October 31	Sacramento	W 103–77	Dwyane Wade (20)	Shawn Marion (10)	Dwyane Wade (8)	American Airlines Arena; 19,600	1–1

November: 7–8 (home: 4–3; road: 3–5)

Game	Date	Team	Score	High points	High rebounds	High assists	Location Attendance	Record
3	November 1	@ Charlotte	L 87–100	Michael Beasley (25)	Shawn Marion (8)	Mario Chalmers (8)	Time Warner Cable Arena; 19,238	1–2
4	November 5	Philadelphia	W 106–83	Dwyane Wade (29)	Michael Beasley (9)	Wade, Chalmers (6)	American Airlines Arena; 15,103	2–2
5	November 7	@ San Antonio	W 99–83	Dwyane Wade (33)	Wade, Haslem (10)	Dwyane Wade (9)	AT&T Center; 17,387	3–2
6	November 8	@ New Orleans	L 89–100	Dwyane Wade (30)	Shawn Marion (8)	Dwyane Wade (10)	New Orleans Arena; 17,701	3–3
7	November 10	New Jersey	W 99–94	Dwyane Wade (33)	Udonis Haslem (8)	Dwyane Wade (5)	American Airlines Arena; 15,028	4–3
8	November 12	Portland	L 96–104	Dwyane Wade (36)	Udonis Haslem (11)	Dwyane Wade (8)	American Airlines Arena; 15,021	4–4
9	November 14	Washington	W 97–77	Dwyane Wade (24)	Udonis Haslem (13)	Mario Chalmers (7)	American Airlines Arena; 15,284	5–4
10	November 16	@ Toronto	L 96–107	Dwyane Wade (29)	Udonis Haslem (10)	Dwyane Wade (8)	Air Canada Centre; 19,800	5–5
11	November 18	@ Washington	W 94–87	Dwyane Wade (19)	Udonis Haslem (11)	Dwyane Wade (10)	Verizon Center; 15,102	6–5
12	November 19	Toronto	L 95–101	Dwyane Wade (40)	Shawn Marion (14)	Dwyane Wade (11)	American Airlines Arena; 15,014	6–6
13	November 22	Indiana	W 109–100	Dwyane Wade (38)	Shawn Marion (9)	Dwyane Wade (8)	American Airlines Arena; 18,685	7–6
14	November 24	Houston	L 98–107	Wade, Chalmers (23)	Joel Anthony (8)	Mario Chalmers (6)	American Airlines Arena; 18,704	7–7
15	November 26	@ Portland	L 68–106	Michael Beasley (14)	Wade, Haslem (6)	Dwyane Wade (6)	Rose Garden; 20,528	7–8
16	November 28	@ Phoenix	W 107–92	Dwyane Wade (43)	Udonis Haslem (11)	Wade, Marion (6)	US Airways Center; 18,422	8–8
17	November 29	@ L.A. Clippers	L 96–97	Dwyane Wade (26)	Shawn Marion (9)	Dwyane Wade (11)	Staples Center; 16,245	8–9

December: 9–4 (home: 6–2; road: 3–2)

Game	Date	Team	Score	High points	High rebounds	High assists	Location Attendance	Record
18	December 1	@ Golden State	W 130–129 (OT)	Dwyane Wade (37)	Shawn Marion (15)	Dwyane Wade (13)	Oracle Arena; 18,723	9–9
19	December 3	@ Utah	W 93–89	Dwyane Wade (23)	Udonis Haslem (13)	Chris Quinn (6)	EnergySolutions Arena; 19,911	10–9
20	December 6	Oklahoma City	W 105–99	Dwyane Wade (38)	Udonis Haslem (14)	Dwyane Wade (7)	American Airlines Arena; 17,585	11–9
21	December 8	Charlotte	W 100–96	Dwyane Wade (41)	Udonis Haslem (9)	Wade, Chalmers (3)	American Airlines Arena; 15,024	12–9
22	December 12	Atlanta	L 73–87	Dwyane Wade (21)	Wade, Haslem (8)	Quinn, Wade (3)	American Airlines Arena; 19,600	12–10
23	December 14	@ Memphis	L 86–102	Michael Beasley (20)	Marion, Anthony (13)	Dwyane Wade (5)	FedExForum; 12,271	12–11
24	December 15	Milwaukee	L 83–98	Mario Chalmers (20)	Mario Chalmers (7)	Chalmers, Wade (8)	American Airlines Arena; 15,029	12–12
25	December 19	L.A. Lakers	W 89–87	Dwyane Wade (35)	Shawn Marion (11)	Mario Chalmers (4)	American Airlines Arena; 19,600	13–12
26	December 20	@ New Jersey	W 106–103	Dwyane Wade (43)	Haslem, Anthony (7)	Mario Chalmers (7)	Izod Center; 14,139	14–12
27	December 23	Golden State	W 96–88	Dwyane Wade (32)	Shawn Marion (16)	Dwyane Wade (8)	American Airlines Arena; 17,862	15–12
28	December 26	Chicago	W 90–77	Dwyane Wade (28)	Udonis Haslem (14)	Mario Chalmers (6)	American Airlines Arena; 19,600	16–12
29	December 28	@ Cleveland	L 86–93	Dwyane Wade (29)	Shawn Marion (10)	Dwyane Wade (8)	Quicken Loans Arena; 20,562	16–13
30	December 30	Cleveland	W 104–95	Wade, Chalmers (21)	Shawn Marion (11)	Dwyane Wade (12)	American Airlines Arena; 19,600	17–13

January: 8–8 (home: 4–3; road: 4–5)

Game	Date	Team	Score	High points	High rebounds	High assists	Location Attendance	Record
31	January 2	@ Orlando	L 76–86	Dwyane Wade (33)	Haslem, Marion (8)	Dwyane Wade (6)	Amway Arena; 17,461	17–14
32	January 3	New Jersey	W 101–96 (OT)	Dwyane Wade (29)	Udonis Haslem (13)	Dwyane Wade (6)	American Airlines Arena; 19,600	18–14
33	January 5	San Antonio	L 84–91	Dwyane Wade (24)	Michael Beasley (12)	Dwyane Wade (12)	American Airlines Arena; 19,600	18–15
34	January 7	@ Denver	L 97–108	Dwyane Wade (31)	Shawn Marion (13)	Mario Chalmers (7)	Pepsi Center; 15,459	18–16
35	January 9	@ Sacramento	W 119–115 (OT)	Dwyane Wade (41)	Michael Beasley (10)	Dwyane Wade (7)	ARCO Arena; 12,587	19–16
36	January 11	@ L.A. Lakers	L 105–108	Dwyane Wade (27)	Shawn Marion (8)	Dwyane Wade (9)	Staples Center; 18,997	19–17
37	January 13	@ Minnesota	W 99–96	Dwyane Wade (31)	Shawn Marion (11)	Dwyane Wade (8)	Target Center; 10,856	20–17
38	January 14	@ Milwaukee	W 102–99	Daequan Cook (24)	Shawn Marion (10)	Dwyane Wade (13)	Bradley Center; 15,271	21–17
39	January 17	@ Houston	L 86–93	Dwyane Wade (29)	Shawn Marion (10)	Dwyane Wade (9)	Toyota Center; 18,369	21–18
40	January 18	@ Oklahoma City	W 104–94	Dwyane Wade (32)	Udonis Haslem (15)	Dwyane Wade (10)	Ford Center; 19,136	22–18
41	January 21	Boston	L 83–98	Dwyane Wade (25)	Michael Beasley (11)	Mario Chalmers (7)	American Airlines Arena; 19,600	22–19
42	January 24	Orlando	W 103–97	Dwyane Wade (27)	Dwyane Wade (8)	Wade, Chalmers (6)	American Airlines Arena; 19,600	23–19
43	January 26	Atlanta	W 95–79	Dwyane Wade (35)	Udonis Haslem (13)	Mario Chalmers (6)	American Airlines Arena; 18,103	24–19
44	January 28	Washington	W 93–71	Beasley, Cook (16)	Anthony, Wade (9)	Dwyane Wade (9)	American Airlines Arena; 16,424	25–19
45	January 30	@ Indiana	L 103–114	Dwyane Wade (24)	Michael Beasley (11)	Quinn, Chalmers (5)	Conseco Fieldhouse; 14,031	25–20
46	January 31	Dallas	L 96–111	Dwyane Wade (30)	Michael Beasley (10)	Chris Quinn (4)	American Airlines Arena; 19,600	25–21

February: 6–6 (home: 5–2; road: 1–4)

Game	Date	Team	Score	High points	High rebounds	High assists	Location Attendance	Record
47	February 2	L.A. Clippers	W 119–95	Dwyane Wade (32)	Beasley, Haslem, Marion, Anthony (7)	Dwyane Wade (9)	American Airlines Arena; 15,985	26–21
48	February 4	@ Detroit	L 90–93	Dwyane Wade (29)	Udonis Haslem (10)	Dwyane Wade (13)	The Palace of Auburn Hills; 21,720	26–22
49	February 7	@ Philadelphia	L 84–94	Dwyane Wade (21)	Udonis Haslem (9)	Wade, Chalmers (7)	Wachovia Center; 17,216	26–23
50	February 8	Charlotte	W 96–92	Dwyane Wade (22)	Shawn Marion (10)	Mario Chalmers (13)	American Airlines Arena; 17,656	27–23
51	February 10	Denver	L 82–99	Dwyane Wade (33)	Wade, Chalmers (7)	Mario Chalmers (5)	American Airlines Arena; 16,784	27–24
52	February 12	@ Chicago	W 95–93	Dwyane Wade (24)	Marion, Haslem, Beasley (7)	Dwyane Wade (7)	United Center; 21,801	28–24
All-Star Break
53	February 18	Minnesota	L 104–111	Dwyane Wade (37)	Udonis Haslem (6)	Dwyane Wade (12)	American Airlines Arena; 17,525	28–25
54	February 21	Philadelphia	W 97–91	Dwyane Wade (25)	O'Neal, Haslem (10)	Dwyane Wade (9)	American Airlines Arena; 19,600	29–25
55	February 22	@ Orlando	L 99–122	Dwyane Wade (50)	Udonis Haslem (8)	Dwyane Wade (5)	Amway Arena; 17,461	29–26
56	February 24	Detroit	W 103–91	Dwyane Wade (31)	Udonis Haslem (11)	Dwyane Wade (16)	American Airlines Arena; 19,600	30–26
57	February 27	@ Atlanta	L 83–91	Michael Beasley (23)	Haslem, O'Neal (11)	Dwyane Wade (10)	Philips Arena; 19,157	30–27
58	February 28	New York	W 120–115	Dwyane Wade (46)	Jamario Moon (12)	Dwyane Wade (10)	American Airlines Arena; 19,600	31–27

March: 8–8 (home: 6–2; road: 2–6)

Game	Date	Team	Score	High points	High rebounds	High assists	Location Attendance	Record
59	March 2	Cleveland	L 100–107	Dwyane Wade (41)	Udonis Haslem (9)	Dwyane Wade (9)	American Airlines Arena; 19,600	31–28
60	March 4	Phoenix	W 135–129	Dwyane Wade (35)	Michael Beasley (9)	Dwyane Wade (16)	American Airlines Arena; 19,600	32–28
61	March 6	@ Toronto	W 108–102	Dwyane Wade (42)	Jermaine O'Neal (8)	Dwyane Wade (8)	Air Canada Centre; 19,800	33–28
62	March 7	@ Cleveland	L 89–99	Dwyane Wade (25)	Dwyane Wade (8)	Dwyane Wade (12)	Quicken Loans Arena; 20,562	33–29
63	March 9	Chicago	W 130–127 (2OT)	Dwyane Wade (48)	Udonis Haslem (8)	Dwyane Wade (12)	American Airlines Arena; 19,600	34–29
64	March 11	Boston	W 107–99	Dwyane Wade (32)	Jamario Moon (8)	Wade, Chalmers (7)	American Airlines Arena; 19,600	35–29
65	March 14	Utah	W 140–129 (3OT)	Dwyane Wade (50)	Udonis Haslem (12)	Dwyane Wade (9)	American Airlines Arena; 19,600	36–29
66	March 15	@ Philadelphia	L 77–85	Jermaine O'Neal (20)	Udonis Haslem (11)	Jamario Moon (6)	Wachovia Center; 20,100	36–30
67	March 18	@ Boston	L 108–112 (OT)	Michael Beasley (21)	Michael Beasley (7)	Mario Chalmers (9)	TD Banknorth Garden; 18,624	36–31
68	March 20	@ New Jersey	L 88–96	Dwyane Wade (27)	Wade, Haslem (8)	Dwyane Wade (6)	Izod Center; 18,108	36–32
69	March 22	@ Detroit	W 101–96	Dwyane Wade (39)	Moon, Haslem (6)	Mario Chalmers (7)	The Palace of Auburn Hills; 22,076	37–32
70	March 23	Memphis	W 94–82	Dwyane Wade (27)	Jamaal Magloire (12)	Dwyane Wade (8)	American Airlines Arena; 18,654	38–32
71	March 25	@ Indiana	L 88–90	Dwyane Wade (21)	Udonis Haslem (14)	Dwyane Wade (8)	Conseco Fieldhouse; 17,117	38–33
72	March 26	@ Chicago	L 87–106	Dwyane Wade (31)	Udonis Haslem (6)	Head, Chalmers (5)	United Center; 21,908	38–34
73	March 28	Milwaukee	W 102–85	Dwyane Wade (27)	Udonis Haslem (12)	Dwyane Wade (7)	American Airlines Arena; 18,108	39–34
74	March 30	Orlando	L 95–101	Dwyane Wade (42)	Jamaal Magloire (8)	Mario Chalmers (7)	American Airlines Arena; 19,600	39–35

April: 4–4 (home: 2–1; road: 2–3)

Game	Date	Team	Score	High points	High rebounds	High assists	Location Attendance	Record
75	April 1	@ Dallas	L 96–98	Dwyane Wade (23)	O'Neal, Haslem (7)	Dwyane Wade (6)	American Airlines Center; 20,021	39–36
76	April 3	@ Charlotte	W 97–92	Dwyane Wade (27)	Daequan Cook (7)	Dwyane Wade (10)	Time Warner Cable Arena; 19,568	40–36
77	April 4	@ Washington	W 118–104	Dwyane Wade (33)	O'Neal, Magloire (6)	Dwyane Wade (8)	Verizon Center; 20,173	41–36
78	April 7	New Orleans	L 87–93 (OT)	Dwyane Wade (32)	Jamaal Magloire (10)	Dwyane Wade (6)	American Airlines Arena; 19,600	41–37
79	April 10	@ Boston	L 98–105	Dwyane Wade (31)	Michael Beasley (13)	Dwyane Wade (9)	TD Banknorth Garden; 18,624	41–38
80	April 12	New York	W 122–105	Dwyane Wade (55)	Michael Beasley (16)	Mario Chalmers (9)	American Airlines Arena; 19,600	42–38
81	April 14	@ Atlanta	L 79–81	Michael Beasley (23)	Michael Beasley (13)	Chris Quinn (7)	Philips Arena; 18,179	42–39
82	April 15	Detroit	W 102–96 (OT)	Chris Quinn (26)	Dorell Wright (10)	Mario Chalmers (10)	American Airlines Arena; 19,600	43–39

2008–09 season schedule

== Playoffs ==
2009 playoff game log
First round: 3–4 (home: 2–1; road: 1–3)

Game	Date	Team	Score	High points	High rebounds	High assists	Location Attendance	Series
1	April 19	@ Atlanta	L 64–90	Dwyane Wade (19)	Michael Beasley (10)	Dwyane Wade (5)	Philips Arena; 18,851	0–1
2	April 22	@ Atlanta	W 108–93	Dwyane Wade (33)	Udonis Haslem (8)	Chalmers, Wade (7)	Philips Arena; 19,146	1–1
3	April 25	Atlanta	W 107–78	Dwyane Wade (29)	Udonis Haslem (13)	Dwyane Wade (8)	American Airlines Arena; 19,600	2–1
4	April 27	Atlanta	L 71–81	Dwyane Wade (22)	Udonis Haslem (9)	Dwyane Wade (7)	American Airlines Arena; 19,600	2–2
5	April 29	@ Atlanta	L 91–106	Dwyane Wade (29)	Udonis Haslem (8)	Mario Chalmers (6)	Philips Arena; 19,051	2–3
6	May 1	Atlanta	W 98–72	Dwyane Wade (41)	Michael Beasley (15)	Mario Chalmers (7)	American Airlines Arena; 19,600	3–3
7	May 3	@ Atlanta	L 78–91	Dwyane Wade (31)	Udonis Haslem (13)	Chalmers, Wade (4)	Philips Arena; 18,864	3–4

2009 schedule

== Player statistics ==
=== Regular season ===
Player	POS	GP	GS	MP	REB	AST	STL	BLK	PTS	MPG	RPG	APG	SPG	BPG	PPG
Mario Chalmers	PG	82	82	2,626	228	403	160	8	818	32.0	2.8	4.9	2.0	.1	10.0
Michael Beasley	PF	81	19	2,009	439	83	41	37	1,123	24.8	5.4	1.0	.5	.5	13.9
Dwyane Wade	SG	79	79	3,048	398	589	173	106	2,386	38.6	5.0	7.5	2.2	1.3	30.2
Udonis Haslem	PF	75	75	2,560	618	85	43	25	794	34.1	8.2	1.1	.6	.3	10.6
Daequan Cook	SF	75	4	1,833	189	71	39	10	686	24.4	2.5	.9	.5	.1	9.1
Chris Quinn	PG	66	0	962	75	132	24	2	339	14.6	1.1	2.0	.4	.0	5.1
Joel Anthony	C	65	28	1,048	197	27	20	93	144	16.1	3.0	.4	.3	1.4	2.2
Yakhouba Diawara	SF	63	21	851	82	27	13	6	213	13.5	1.3	.4	.2	.1	3.4
Jamaal Magloire	C	55	12	709	222	22	11	25	159	12.9	4.0	.4	.2	.5	2.9
Shawn Marion^{†}	SF	42	41	1,516	365	77	57	45	505	36.1	8.7	1.8	1.4	1.1	12.0
James Jones	SF	40	1	630	62	20	12	14	169	15.8	1.6	.5	.3	.4	4.2
Jermaine O'Neal^{†}	C	27	27	811	145	55	11	54	350	30.0	5.4	2.0	.4	2.0	13.0
Jamario Moon^{†}	SF	26	21	689	116	25	21	16	184	26.5	4.5	1.0	.8	.6	7.1
Mark Blount	C	20	0	207	41	4	1	7	79	10.4	2.1	.2	.1	.4	4.0
Marcus Banks^{†}	PG	16	0	166	15	22	10	2	42	10.4	.9	1.4	.6	.1	2.6
Luther Head^{†}	SG	10	0	176	25	23	11	1	43	17.6	2.5	2.3	1.1	.1	4.3
Dorell Wright	SF	6	0	73	20	2	2	0	18	12.2	3.3	.3	.3	.0	3.0
Shaun Livingston^{†}	PG	4	0	41	2	4	2	0	9	10.3	.5	1.0	.5	.0	2.3

- ^{†} Denotes player spent time with another team in the season. Stats reflect time with the Heat only.

=== Playoffs ===
Player	POS	GP	GS	MP	REB	AST	STL	BLK	PTS	MPG	RPG	APG	SPG	BPG	PPG
Dwyane Wade	SG	7	7	285	35	37	6	11	204	40.7	5.0	5.3	.9	1.6	29.1
James Jones	SF	7	7	235	16	5	3	1	67	33.6	2.3	.7	.4	.1	9.6
Mario Chalmers	PG	7	7	231	19	31	20	1	51	33.0	2.7	4.4	2.9	.1	7.3
Udonis Haslem	PF	7	7	204	61	3	3	3	59	29.1	8.7	.4	.4	.4	8.4
Michael Beasley	PF	7	0	178	51	7	2	7	85	25.4	7.3	1.0	.3	1.0	12.1
Daequan Cook	SF	7	0	161	17	4	2	0	37	23.0	2.4	.6	.3	.0	5.3
Jermaine O'Neal	C	6	5	162	27	9	3	9	80	27.0	4.5	1.5	.5	1.5	13.3
Joel Anthony	C	6	2	88	19	2	0	7	10	14.7	3.2	.3	.0	1.2	1.7
Jamaal Magloire	C	6	0	47	11	1	0	0	2	7.8	1.8	.2	.0	.0	.3
Chris Quinn	PG	5	0	24	1	5	2	0	8	4.8	.2	1.0	.4	.0	1.6
Yakhouba Diawara	SF	5	0	21	5	0	1	0	2	4.2	1.0	.0	.2	.0	.4
Jamario Moon	SF	3	0	40	9	1	1	1	12	13.3	3.0	.3	.3	.3	4.0
Dorell Wright	SF	1	0	3	0	0	0	0	0	3.0	.0	.0	.0	.0	.0

== Transactions ==
=== Trades ===
The Heat traded Shawn Marion, Marcus Banks, and cash to the Toronto Raptors for Jermaine O'Neal, Jamario Moon, and a $4 Million trade exception on February 13, 2009.

=== Free agents ===
==== Additions ====
Player	Signed	Former team
Shaun Livingston	October 3	Los Angeles Clippers

==== Subtractions ====
Player	Left	New team
Ricky Davis	July 28	Los Angeles Clippers
Jason Williams	August 7	Los Angeles Clippers
