= 2008–09 Chicago Bulls season =

NBA professional basketball team season

- Head coach: Vinny Del Negro
- General manager: John Paxson
- Owner: Jerry Reinsdorf
- Arena: United Center

Results
- Record: 41–41 (.500)
- Place: Division: 2nd (Central); Conference: 7th (Eastern)
- Playoff finish: First Round (lost to Celtics 3–4)
- Stats at Basketball Reference

Local media
- Television: CSN Chicago (38 games); CSN Chicago Plus (4 games); WGN America (14 games); WGN (24 games); WCIU (10 games)
- Radio: WMVP

The 2008–09 Chicago Bulls season is the 43rd season of the franchise in the National Basketball Association (NBA). After winning the draft lottery for the first time since 1999, the Bulls drafted future All-Star Derrick Rose first overall. Rose would then go on to win the NBA Rookie of the Year award following the conclusion of the season.

The Bulls finished with a 41–41 record for the second time in their past four seasons, finishing 7th in the East enough for a playoff spot. In the playoffs, they lost to the defending NBA champions, the Boston Celtics, in seven games of the First Round. T

== Key dates ==
- June 26: The 2008 NBA draft took place in New York City.
- July 1: The free agency period started.

== Offseason ==
The Bulls re-signed Luol Deng to a 6-year $71 million contract on July 30, 2008. Ben Gordon signed a 1-year contract on October 2, 2008.

== NBA draft ==
Round	Pick	Player	Position	Nationality	School/Club team
1	1	Derrick Rose	G	United States	Memphis
2	39	Sonny Weems	G	United States	Arkansas

== Roster ==
2008–09 Chicago Bulls roster
Players

Pos.	No.	Player	Height	Weight	DOB	From
F	9	Luol Deng	6 ft 9 in (2.06 m)	220 lb (100 kg)	1985-04-16	Duke
G	7	Ben Gordon	6 ft 3 in (1.91 m)	200 lb (91 kg)	1983-04-04	Connecticut
C	34	Aaron Gray	7 ft 0 in (2.13 m)	270 lb (122 kg)	1984-12-07	Pittsburgh
G	12	Kirk Hinrich	6 ft 3 in (1.91 m)	190 lb (86 kg)	1981-01-02	Kansas
G	11	Lindsey Hunter	6 ft 2 in (1.88 m)	170 lb (77 kg)	1970-12-03	Jackson State
C	31	Jerome James (injured)	7 ft 1 in (2.16 m)	285 lb (129 kg)	1975-11-17	Florida A&M
F	54	Linton Johnson	6 ft 8 in (2.03 m)	205 lb (93 kg)	1980-06-13	Tulane
F/C	52	Brad Miller	6 ft 11 in (2.11 m)	244 lb (111 kg)	1976-04-12	Purdue
G	21	DeMarcus Nelson	6 ft 4 in (1.93 m)	200 lb (91 kg)	1985-11-02	Duke
C	13	Joakim Noah	6 ft 11 in (2.11 m)	232 lb (105 kg)	1985-02-25	Florida
G	5	Anthony Roberson	6 ft 2 in (1.88 m)	180 lb (82 kg)	1983-02-14	Florida
G	1	Derrick Rose	6 ft 3 in (1.91 m)	190 lb (86 kg)	1988-10-04	Memphis
G/F	15	John Salmons	6 ft 7 in (2.01 m)	210 lb (95 kg)	1979-12-12	Miami (FL)
F	2	Tim Thomas	6 ft 10 in (2.08 m)	230 lb (104 kg)	1977-02-26	Villanova
F/C	24	Tyrus Thomas	6 ft 9 in (2.06 m)	215 lb (98 kg)	1986-08-17	LSU

Coaches
Head coach
- Vinny Del Negro
Assistant(s)
- Bernie Bickerstaff
- Pete Myers
- Bob Ociepka
- Dave Severns
- Mike Wilhelm
- Del Harris
- Fred Tedeschi (trainer)

Legend
- (DP) Unsigned draft pick
- (FA) Free agent
- (S) Suspended
- (DL) On assignment to D-League affiliate
- Injured

Roster
Updated: April 9, 2009

== Regular season ==
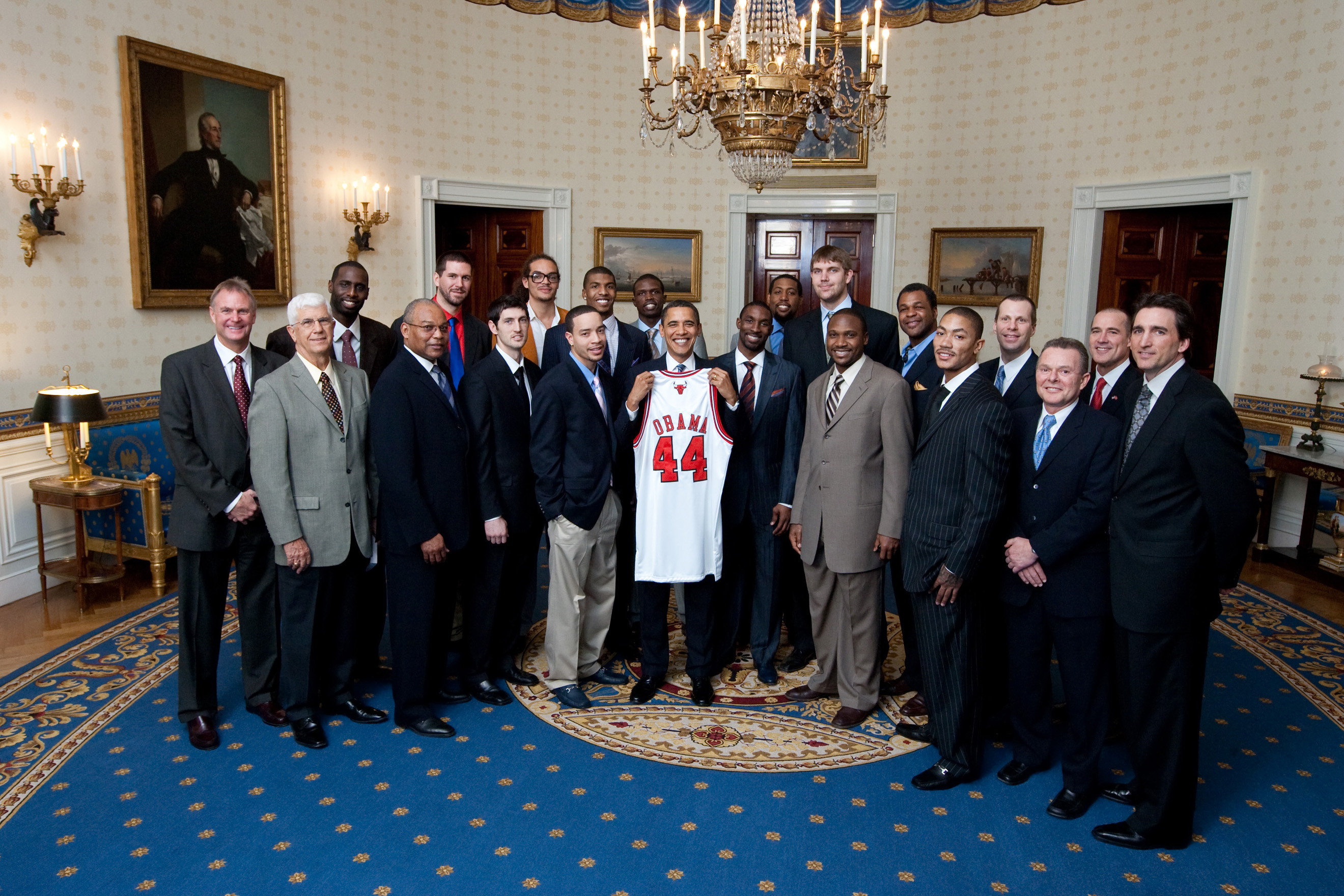
The 2008–09 team visits President of the United States Barack Obama at the White House on February 26, 2009.

The Bulls were having a meager year floating under .500 and on February 18, 2009 they made their first of several trades sending Andrés Nocioni, Drew Gooden, Cedric Simmons, Michael Ruffin to the Sacramento Kings for Brad Miller and John Salmons. Then on February 19, 2009, the NBA trade deadline, the Bulls traded Larry Hughes to the New York Knicks for Tim Thomas, Jerome James, and Anthony Roberson. Later that day the Bulls made the third trade in a span of less than 24 hours sending swingman Thabo Sefolosha to the Oklahoma City Thunder for a 2009 first round pick.

The trades brought a late-season push for the Bulls, which finally clinched a playoff berth on April 10, 2009, their fourth in the last five years. Then on April 13, 2009 they clinched the 7th place in the east by beating the Detroit Pistons and remained .5 game ahead of Philadelphia 76ers for the 6th spot with one game remaining. The Bulls though lost their last game to Toronto and the 76ers beat Cleveland, who did not play most of its best players. The Bulls finished 7th even though they tied Philadelphia at 41-41. The Bulls got matched up with a Garnett-less Boston in the first round of the playoffs.

=== Season standings ===
Central Division	W	L	PCT	GB	Home	Road	Div	GP
z-Cleveland Cavaliers	66	16	.805	—	39–2	27–14	13–3	82
x-Chicago Bulls	41	41	.500	25	28–13	13–28	9–7	82
x-Detroit Pistons	39	43	.476	27	21–20	18–23	7–9	82
Indiana Pacers	36	46	.439	30	25–16	11–30	7–9	82
Milwaukee Bucks	34	48	.415	32	22–19	12–29	4–12	82

#	Eastern Conference				
#	Team	W	L	PCT	GB
1	z-Cleveland Cavaliers	66	16	.805	—
2	y-Boston Celtics	62	20	.756	4
3	y-Orlando Magic	59	23	.720	7
4	x-Atlanta Hawks	47	35	.573	19
5	x-Miami Heat	43	39	.524	23
6	x-Philadelphia 76ers	41	41	.500	25
7	x-Chicago Bulls	41	41	.500	25
8	x-Detroit Pistons	39	43	.476	27
9	Indiana Pacers	36	46	.439	30
10	Charlotte Bobcats	35	47	.427	31
11	New Jersey Nets	34	48	.415	32
12	Milwaukee Bucks	34	48	.415	32
13	Toronto Raptors	33	49	.402	33
14	New York Knicks	32	50	.390	34
15	Washington Wizards	19	63	.232	47

=== Game log ===
2008–09 game log
October: 1–1 (home: 1–0; road: 0–1)

Game	Date	Team	Score	High points	High rebounds	High assists	Location Attendance	Record
1	October 28	Milwaukee	W 108–95	Luol Deng (21)	Tyrus Thomas (10)	Derrick Rose (9)	United Center; 21,762	1–0
2	October 31	@ Boston	L 80–96	Derrick Rose (18)	Joakim Noah (13)	Ben Gordon, Kirk Hinrich (3)	TD Banknorth Garden; 18,624	1–1

November: 7–8 (home: 4–2; road: 3–6)

Game	Date	Team	Score	High points	High rebounds	High assists	Location Attendance	Record
3	November 1	Memphis	W 96–86	Derrick Rose (26)	Drew Gooden (20)	Kirk Hinrich, Ben Gordon (4)	United Center; 21,785	2–1
4	November 3	@ Orlando	L 93–96	Drew Gooden (21)	Andrés Nocioni, Luol Deng (7)	Kirk Hinrich, Drew Gooden, Luol Deng (3)	Amway Arena; 15,606	2–2
5	November 5	@ Cleveland	L 93–107	Ben Gordon (31)	Drew Gooden (9)	Derrick Rose (7)	Quicken Loans Arena; 20,562	2–3
6	November 7	Phoenix	W 100–83	Ben Gordon (23)	Joakim Noah (14)	Ben Gordon, Derrick Rose (6)	United Center; 21,967	3–3
7	November 8	Cleveland	L 97–106	Ben Gordon (29)	Tyrus Thomas (8)	Derrick Rose (9)	United Center; 21,965	3–4
8	November 11	Atlanta	L 108–113	Derrick Rose (26)	Derrick Rose, Luol Deng, Aaron Gray (10)	Derrick Rose (6)	United Center; 21,738	3–5
9	November 13	Dallas	W 98–91	Ben Gordon (35)	Luol Deng, Derrick Rose (9)	Derrick Rose (6)	United Center; 21,751	4–5
10	November 15	Indiana	W 104–91	Derrick Rose (23)	Andrés Nocioni (11)	Derrick Rose (8)	United Center; 21,759	5–5
11	November 18	@ L.A. Lakers	L 109–116	Derrick Rose (25)	Andrés Nocioni (8)	Derrick Rose (9)	Staples Center; 18,997	5–6
12	November 19	@ Portland	L 74–116	Andrés Nocioni (13)	Tyrus Thomas (7)	Lindsey Hunter, Ben Gordon (3)	Rose Garden; 20,599	5–7
13	November 21	@ Golden State	W 115–110	Larry Hughes (26)	Drew Gooden (16)	Derrick Rose (5)	Oracle Arena; 19,596	6–7
14	November 23	@ Denver	L 101–114	Ben Gordon (28)	Joakim Noah (9)	Derrick Rose (6)	Pepsi Center; 16,202	6–8
15	November 24	@ Utah	W 101–100	Derrick Rose (25)	Tyrus Thomas (8)	Derrick Rose (9)	EnergySolutions Arena; 19,911	7–8
16	November 26	@ San Antonio	L 88–98	Ben Gordon (23)	Drew Gooden (12)	Derrick Rose (6)	AT&T Center; 17,837	7–9
17	November 30	@ Philadelphia	W 103–92	Ben Gordon (21)	Drew Gooden (12)	Derrick Rose (10)	Wachovia Center; 13,561	8–9

December: 6–9 (home: 5–2; road: 1–7)

Game	Date	Team	Score	High points	High rebounds	High assists	Location Attendance	Record
18	December 2	Philadelphia	L 95–103 (OT)	Derrick Rose (24)	Tyrus Thomas (13)	Ben Gordon (4)	United Center; 20,485	8–10
19	December 3	@ Milwaukee	L 90–97	Ben Gordon (22)	Drew Gooden (9)	Derrick Rose (9)	Bradley Center; 13,684	8–11
20	December 6	Washington	W 117–110	Luol Deng (26)	Drew Gooden (10)	Derrick Rose (8)	United Center; 21,741	9–11
21	December 9	New York	W 105–100	Drew Gooden (22)	Drew Gooden (16)	Derrick Rose (7)	United Center; 19,519	10–11
22	December 12	@ Memphis	L 96–103	Ben Gordon (26)	Drew Gooden (13)	Derrick Rose (11)	FedExForum; 17,132	10–12
23	December 13	New Jersey	W 113–104	Ben Gordon (29)	Joakim Noah (8)	Ben Gordon, Derrick Rose (6)	United Center; 21,751	11–12
24	December 16	@ Charlotte	L 101–110 (OT)	Ben Gordon (25)	Tyrus Thomas, Drew Gooden (9)	Derrick Rose (7)	Time Warner Cable Arena; 11,225	11–13
25	December 17	L.A. Clippers	W 115–109 (OT)	Andrés Nocioni, Ben Gordon (22)	Drew Gooden (11)	Derrick Rose (7)	United Center; 20,102	12–13
26	December 19	@ Boston	L 108–126	Luol Deng (19)	Aaron Gray (8)	Derrick Rose (5)	TD Banknorth Garden; 18,624	12–14
27	December 20	Utah	W 106–98	Ben Gordon (26)	Joakim Noah (9)	Ben Gordon, Derrick Rose, Andrés Nocioni (3)	United Center; 22,046	13–14
28	December 23	@ Detroit	L 98–104	Larry Hughes (19)	Tyrus Thomas (12)	Ben Gordon (7)	The Palace of Auburn Hills; 22,076	13–15
29	December 26	@ Miami	L 77–90	Ben Gordon (15)	Aaron Gray (11)	Derrick Rose (3)	American Airlines Arena; 19,600	13–16
30	December 27	@ Atlanta	L 117–129	Ben Gordon (33)	Tyrus Thomas (9)	Derrick Rose (7)	Philips Arena; 18,031	13–17
31	December 29	@ New Jersey	W 100–87	Ben Gordon (24)	Andrés Nocioni (8)	Derrick Rose (13)	Izod Center; 18,786	14–17
32	December 31	Orlando	L 94–113	Joakim Noah (19)	Joakim Noah (11)	Thabo Sefolosha, Andrés Nocioni (4)	United Center; 21,861	14–18

January: 7–9 (home: 3–6; road: 4–3)

Game	Date	Team	Score	High points	High rebounds	High assists	Location Attendance	Record
33	January 2	@ Cleveland	L 92–117	Ben Gordon (22)	Joakim Noah (10)	Ben Gordon (4)	Quicken Loans Arena; 20,562	14–19
34	January 3	Minnesota	L 92–102	Derrick Rose (22)	Aaron Gray (9)	Ben Gordon (6)	United Center; 20,516	14–20
35	January 6	Sacramento	W 99–94	Ben Gordon (24)	Drew Gooden (10)	Derrick Rose (8)	United Center; 18,060	15–20
36	January 9	Washington	W 98–86	Ben Gordon (22)	Drew Gooden (11)	Derrick Rose (9)	United Center; 20,125	16–20
37	January 10	Oklahoma City	L 98–109 (OT)	Ben Gordon (22)	Drew Gooden (12)	Derrick Rose (6)	United Center; 20,469	16–21
38	January 12	Portland	L 95–109	Drew Gooden (22)	Drew Gooden (9)	Derrick Rose (10)	United Center; 18,996	16–22
39	January 14	@ Toronto	W 102–98	Derrick Rose (25)	Luol Deng (14)	Derrick Rose (10)	Air Canada Centre; 18,494	17–22
40	January 15	Cleveland	W 102–93 (OT)	Luol Deng (22)	Luol Deng (8)	Derrick Rose (6)	United Center; 21,297	18–22
41	January 17	San Antonio	L 87–92	Ben Gordon (20)	Andrés Nocioni (15)	Derrick Rose (8)	United Center; 22,100	18–23
42	January 19	@ New York	L 98–102	Luol Deng, Derrick Rose (20)	Joakim Noah (18)	Derrick Rose (8)	Madison Square Garden; 18,807	18–24
43	January 20	Atlanta	L 102–105	Ben Gordon (21)	Joakim Noah (11)	Kirk Hinrich (8)	United Center; 20,389	18–25
44	January 23	Toronto	L 94–114	Ben Gordon (19)	Aaron Gray (7)	Kirk Hinrich (7)	United Center; 20,886	18–26
45	January 25	@ Minnesota	L 108–109 (OT)	Ben Gordon (23)	Joakim Noah (10)	Derrick Rose (7)	Target Center; 16,009	18–27
46	January 28	@ L.A. Clippers	W 95–75	Luol Deng (23)	Tyrus Thomas (10)	Ben Gordon (8)	Staples Center; 15,637	19–27
47	January 30	@ Sacramento	W 109–88	Ben Gordon, Luol Deng (20)	Tyrus Thomas (10)	Derrick Rose (11)	ARCO Arena; 13,356	20–27
48	January 31	@ Phoenix	W 122–111	Derrick Rose, Ben Gordon (26)	Luol Deng (10)	Kirk Hinrich, Ben Gordon (6)	US Airways Center; 18,422	21–27

February: 6–6 (home: 4–1; road: 2–5)

Game	Date	Team	Score	High points	High rebounds	High assists	Location Attendance	Record
49	February 3	@ Houston	L 100–107	Luol Deng (28)	Tyrus Thomas (13)	Derrick Rose (7)	Toyota Center; 16,653	21–28
50	February 4	@ New Orleans	W 107–93	Derrick Rose (21)	Tyrus Thomas (10)	Ben Gordon (7)	New Orleans Arena; 16,270	22–28
51	February 7	@ Dallas	L 114–115 (OT)	Ben Gordon (28)	Tyrus Thomas (12)	Derrick Rose (9)	American Airlines Center; 20,349	22–29
52	February 10	Detroit	W 107–102	Ben Gordon (24)	Joakim Noah (16)	Kirk Hinrich (5)	United Center; 21,896	23–29
53	February 12	Miami	L 93–95	Ben Gordon (34)	Joakim Noah (11)	Derrick Rose (6)	United Center; 21,801	23–30
54	February 18	@ Milwaukee	W 113–104	Kirk Hinrich (31)	Joakim Noah (9)	Derrick Rose (9)	Bradley Center; 15,309	24–30
55	February 20	Denver	W 116–99	Ben Gordon (37)	Luol Deng, Tyrus Thomas (12)	Kirk Hinrich (8)	United Center; 21,790	25–30
56	February 22	@ Indiana	L 91–98	Ben Gordon (28)	Joakim Noah (12)	Derrick Rose (8)	Conseco Fieldhouse; 17,083	25–31
57	February 24	Orlando	W 120–102	Derrick Rose (22)	Joakim Noah (8)	Derrick Rose, Brad Miller (5)	United Center; 21,902	26–31
58	February 25	@ New Jersey	L 99–111	Ben Gordon (17)	Tyrus Thomas (11)	Kirk Hinrich, Derrick Rose (5)	Izod Center; 14,075	26–32
59	February 27	@ Washington	L 90–113	John Salmons (25)	Brad Miller (11)	Luol Deng, John Salmons, Derrick Rose (3)	Verizon Center; 18,114	26–33
60	February 28	Houston	W 105–102	Derrick Rose (22)	Joakim Noah (15)	Derrick Rose (7)	United Center; 22,394	27–33

March: 9–7 (home: 7–1; road: 2–6)

Game	Date	Team	Score	High points	High rebounds	High assists	Location Attendance	Record
61	March 3	@ Charlotte	L 80–96	Ben Gordon, Tyrus Thomas (14)	Tyrus Thomas (12)	Derrick Rose (5)	Time Warner Cable Arena; 14,216	27–34
62	March 4	Golden State	W 110–88	John Salmons (23)	Joakim Noah (17)	Derrick Rose, Kirk Hinrich (6)	United Center; 20,108	28–34
63	March 6	Milwaukee	W 117–102	Ben Gordon (34)	Joakim Noah (13)	Ben Gordon (7)	United Center; 21,186	29–34
64	March 9	@ Miami	L 127–130 (2OT)	Ben Gordon (43)	Joakim Noah (15)	Ben Gordon, Derrick Rose, Brad Miller, Kirk Hinrich (3)	American Airlines Arena; 19,600	29–35
65	March 11	@ Orlando	L 79–107	John Salmons (18)	John Salmons (8)	Derrick Rose (3)	Amway Arena; 17,461	29–36
66	March 13	@ Philadelphia	L 101–104	Derrick Rose (20)	Joakim Noah (9)	Derrick Rose (6)	Wachovia Center; 17,563	29–37
67	March 14	New Orleans	W 97–79	Ben Gordon (27)	Brad Miller, Joakim Noah (9)	Derrick Rose (7)	United Center; 22,135	30–37
68	March 17	Boston	W 127–121	John Salmons (38)	Brad Miller (14)	Derrick Rose (8)	United Center; 22,107	31–37
69	March 18	@ Oklahoma City	W 103–96	Derrick Rose (25)	Tyrus Thomas (11)	Brad Miller (5)	Ford Center; 19,136	32–37
70	March 21	L.A. Lakers	L 109–117	John Salmons (30)	Tyrus Thomas (16)	Ben Gordon (6)	United Center; 23,011	32–38
71	March 23	@ Washington	W 101–99	Ben Gordon (21)	Joakim Noah (12)	Derrick Rose (8)	Verizon Center; 15,421	33–38
72	March 24	Detroit	W 99–91	Kirk Hinrich (24)	Tyrus Thomas (12)	Kirk Hinrich (8)	United Center; 20,502	34–38
73	March 26	Miami	W 106–87	John Salmons (27)	Tyrus Thomas (12)	Derrick Rose (7)	United Center; 21,908	35–38
74	March 28	Indiana	W 112–106	Ben Gordon (25)	Derrick Rose (9)	Derrick Rose (8)	United Center; 20,756	36–38
75	March 29	@ Toronto	L 129–134 (OT)	Ben Gordon (37)	Brad Miller (10)	Derrick Rose (9)	Air Canada Centre; 18,949	36–39
76	March 31	@ Indiana	L 105–107	Derrick Rose (24)	Derrick Rose (11)	Brad Miller (8)	Conseco Fieldhouse; 15,687	36–40

April: 5–1 (home: 4–1; road: 1–0)

Game	Date	Team	Score	High points	High rebounds	High assists	Location Attendance	Record
77	April 4	New Jersey	W 103–94	Ben Gordon (18)	Joakim Noah (10)	Derrick Rose, Kirk Hinrich (5)	United Center; 21,424	37–40
78	April 7	New York	W 110–103	Kirk Hinrich (25)	Brad Miller (12)	John Salmons, Derrick Rose (6)	United Center; 20,764	38–40
79	April 9	Philadelphia	W 113–99	Ben Gordon, Tyrus Thomas (24)	Ben Gordon, Joakim Noah (7)	Derrick Rose (8)	United Center; 20,791	39–40
80	April 11	Charlotte	W 113–106	Ben Gordon (39)	Joakim Noah (10)	Derrick Rose, Joakim Noah (7)	United Center; 20,265	40–40
81	April 13	@ Detroit	W 91–88	Derrick Rose (24)	Joakim Noah (13)	Derrick Rose (8)	The Palace of Auburn Hills; 22,076	41–40
82	April 15	Toronto	L 98–109	Ben Gordon (23)	Brad Miller (11)	Derrick Rose (11)	United Center; 20,677	41–41

2008–09 season schedule

== Playoffs ==
The Bulls-Celtics series became the first playoff series in NBA history to have 4 games go into overtime.

2009 playoff game log
First Round: 3–4 (home: 2–1; road: 1–3)

Game	Date	Team	Score	High points	High rebounds	High assists	Location Attendance	Series
1	April 18	@ Boston	W 105–103 (OT)	Derrick Rose (36)	Joakim Noah (17)	Derrick Rose (11)	TD Banknorth Garden; 18,624	1–0
2	April 20	@ Boston	L 115–118	Ben Gordon (42)	Brad Miller (9)	Kirk Hinrich (7)	TD Banknorth Garden; 18,624	1–1
3	April 23	Boston	L 86–107	Ben Gordon (15)	Joakim Noah (10)	3 players tied (3)	United Center; 23,072	1–2
4	April 26	Boston	W 121–118 (2OT)	Derrick Rose (23)	Derrick Rose (11)	Derrick Rose (9)	United Center; 23,067	2–2
5	April 28	@ Boston	L 104–106 (OT)	Ben Gordon (26)	Joakim Noah (17)	Gordon, Rose (6)	TD Banknorth Garden; 18,624	2–3
6	April 30	Boston	W 128–127 (3OT)	John Salmons (35)	Joakim Noah (15)	Rose, Hinrich (7)	United Center; 23,430	3–3
7	May 2	@ Boston	L 99–109	Ben Gordon (33)	Joakim Noah (15)	Ben Gordon (4)	TD Banknorth Garden; 18,624	3–4
Legend: Win Loss

2009 playoff schedule

== Player statistics ==
Legend
GP	Games played	GS	Games started	MPG	Minutes per game
FG%	Field-goal percentage	3P%	3-point field-goal percentage	FT%	Free-throw percentage
RPG	Rebounds per game	APG	Assists per game	SPG	Steals per game
BPG	Blocks per game	PPG	Points per game	Source:

=== Season ===
Player	GP	GS	MPG	FG%	3P%	FT%	RPG	APG	SPG	BPG	PPG
Luol Deng	49	46	34.0	.448	.400	.796	6.0	1.9	1.22	0.51	14.1
Drew Gooden*	31	27	29.6	.457	.000	.866	8.6	1.4	0.84	0.45	13.1
Ben Gordon	82	76	36.6	.455	.410	.864	3.5	3.4	0.87	0.27	20.7
Aaron Gray	56	18	12.8	.485	.000	.576	3.9	0.8	0.25	0.32	3.5
Kirk Hinrich	51	4	26.3	.437	.408	.791	2.4	3.9	1.29	0.37	9.9
Larry Hughes*	30	6	26.4	.412	.392	.817	3.1	2.0	1.20	0.30	12.0
Lindsey Hunter	28	0	9.5	.329	.333	.600	0.4	1.3	0.71	0.04	2.6
Linton Johnson*	8	0	5.3	.364	.500	.000	1.0	0.3	0.13	0.00	1.1
Brad Miller*	27	0	27.6	.478	.231	.853	7.4	3.2	0.81	0.44	11.8
Demetris Nichols*	2	0	2.5	.250	.000	.000	0.0	0.5	0.00	0.00	1.0
Joakim Noah	80	55	24.2	.556	.000	.676	7.6	1.3	0.61	1.38	6.7
Andrés Nocioni*	53	2	24.1	.414	.378	.806	4.2	1.1	0.49	0.30	10.4
Anthony Roberson*	6	0	3.8	.294	.200	.000	1.2	0.2	0.00	0.00	2.0
Derrick Rose	81	80	37.0	.475	.222	.788	3.9	6.3	0.81	0.22	16.8
John Salmons*	26	21	37.7	.473	.415	.843	4.3	2.0	0.96	0.58	18.3
Thabo Sefolosha*	43	14	17.1	.434	.300	.840	2.9	1.5	0.81	0.44	4.5
Cedric Simmons*	11	0	5.5	.524	.000	.429	1.1	0.2	0.09	0.36	2.5
Tim Thomas*	18	0	14.1	.400	.442	.700	2.3	0.7	0.33	0.00	5.8
Tyrus Thomas	79	61	27.5	.451	.333	.783	6.4	1.0	1.15	1.91	10.8

*Statistics with the Chicago Bulls

=== Playoffs ===
Player	GP	GS	MPG	FG%	3P%	FT%	RPG	APG	SPG	BPG	PPG
Ben Gordon	7	7	43.4	.388	.370	.875	2.9	3.0	.43	.14	24.3
John Salmons	7	7	44.7	.402	.316	.853	4.4	2.3	1.29	1.00	18.1
Derrick Rose	7	7	44.7	.492	.000	.800	6.3	6.4	.57	.71	19.7
Brad Miller	7	0	26.5	.471	.714	.792	7.9	1.3	.29	.86	10.1
Tyrus Thomas	7	7	27.9	.438	.000	.786	6.3	.86	1.00	2.6	9.6
Kirk Hinrich	7	0	30.0	.468	.394	.680	4.1	2.9	1.71	.43	12.6
Joakim Noah	7	7	38.7	.509	.000	.760	13.1	2.3	.86	2.14	10.1
Tim Thomas	2	0	7.5	.300	.250	.000	1.5	0.0	.00	.00	3.5
Aaron Gray	2	0	4.5	.000	.000	.000	0.5	0.0	.00	.00	0.0
Lindsey Hunter	6	0	4.0	.333	.333	.750	0.71	0.71	.29	.00	0.86
Anthony Roberson	1	0	4.0	.750	1.000	.000	1.0	0.0	2.0	.00	8.0
Linton Johnson	3	0	3.3	.500	.000	1.000	1.3	0.3	.00	.00	1.3
TOTAL	7	---	---	.442	.388	.793	45.6	22.0	9.14	6.71	111.1

== Awards and records ==
=== Awards ===
- Derrick Rose = Rookie of the Year
- Derrick Rose won the All-Star Weekend Skills Challenge
- Derrick Rose was named to the NBA All-Rookie First Team

=== Records ===
- 4—Overtime games played in this series
- 7—Overtime periods played in this series, more than any other NBA team has played in an entire postseason.

== Transactions ==
=== Draft picks ===
The Bulls beat the odds and won the NBA Draft Lottery on May 20, 2008. The Bulls vaulted from the ninth spot to win the NBA Draft Lottery in Secaucus, NJ, and obtain the first pick in the June 26 NBA Draft. Chicago had a 1.7 percent chance of winning and were represented by Executive Vice President, Business Operations Steve Schanwald. The Heat had the best odds of securing the top selection and will pick second followed by the Timberwolves and Sonics.

Round	Pick	Player	Position	Nationality	College
1	1	Derrick Rose	Point guard	American	University of Memphis
2	39	Sonny Weems	Shooting guard	American	University of Arkansas

=== Trades ===
Date	Acquired	From	For
June 26, 2009	Ömer Aşık	Portland Trail Blazers	Sonny Weems
February 18, 2009	Brad Miller and John Salmons	Sacramento Kings	Drew Gooden, Andrés Nocioni, Michael Ruffin and Cedric Simmons
February 19, 2009	Jerome James, Anthony Roberson and Tim Thomas	New York Knicks	Larry Hughes
February 19, 2009	2009 First Round Draft Pick	Oklahoma City Thunder	Thabo Sefolosha

=== Free agents ===
==== Additions ====
Player	Signed	Former team
Michael Ruffin	October 27, 2008	Washington Wizards
Lindsey Hunter	November 13, 2008	Detroit Pistons
Linton Johnson	March 11, 2009	Charlotte Bobcats
DeMarcus Nelson	April 9, 2009	Golden State Warriors

==== Subtractions ====
Player	Left	New team
JamesOn Curry	July 31, 2009	None
Shannon Brown	August 6, 2009	Charlotte Bobcats
Demetris Nichols	November 17, 2009	New York Knicks
