= 2008–09 Milwaukee Bucks season =

NBA professional basketball team season

- Head coach: Scott Skiles
- General manager: John Hammond
- Owners: Herb Kohl
- Arena: Bradley Center

Results
- Record: 34–48 (.415)
- Place: Division: 5th (Central); Conference: 12th (Eastern)
- Playoff finish: Did not qualify
- Stats at Basketball Reference

Local media
- Television: Fox Sports North
- Radio: WTMJ

The 2008–09 Milwaukee Bucks season is the 41st season of the franchise in the National Basketball Association (NBA).

== Key dates ==
- June 26: The 2008 NBA draft took place in New York City.
- July 1: The free agency period started.
- October 6: The pre-season started with a game against the Minnesota Timberwolves.
- October 28: The regular season started with a game against the Chicago Bulls.

== Offseason ==
On Monday April 21, 2008, the Bucks introduced Scott Skiles as their new coach. Skiles becomes the 11th head coach in the history of the franchise. Skiles was a former coach with the Chicago Bulls and Phoenix Suns coach. He agreed to a four-year deal to replace his close friend, Larry Krystkowiak. Skiles stated that he is not backing away from his reputation for demanding a lot from his players. Skiles, 44, has amassed an overall record of 281-251 (.528) as an NBA head coach. He was hired as head coach of the Bulls on November 28, 2003, and inherited a team with a record of 4 wins and 12 losses. While in Chicago, Skiles led the Bulls to three postseason appearances. The Bulls won 49 games in 2006–07, their most since they went 62–20 in ’97-98. In the playoffs, the Bulls swept the defending NBA champion Miami Heat 4-0 in the first round of the 2007 NBA playoffs.

== Draft picks ==
Round	Pick	Player	Position	Nationality	College
1	8	Joe Alexander	Small forward	United States	West Virginia
2	37	Luc Richard Mbah a Moute	Forward	Cameroon	UCLA Jr.

== Roster ==
2008–09 Milwaukee Bucks roster
Players

Pos.	No.	Player	Height	Weight	DOB	From
F	11	Joe Alexander	6 ft 8 in (2.03 m)	220 lb (100 kg)	1986–12–26	West Virginia
F	30	Malik Allen	6 ft 10 in (2.08 m)	255 lb (116 kg)	1978–06–27	Villanova
G	42	Charlie Bell	6 ft 3 in (1.91 m)	200 lb (91 kg)	1979–03–12	Michigan State
G/F	10	Keith Bogans	6 ft 5 in (1.96 m)	215 lb (98 kg)	1980–05–12	Kentucky
C	6	Andrew Bogut (injured) (IN)	7 ft 0 in (2.13 m)	260 lb (118 kg)	1984–11–28	Utah
C	9	Francisco Elson	7 ft 0 in (2.13 m)	235 lb (107 kg)	1976–02–28	California
C	50	Dan Gadzuric	6 ft 11 in (2.11 m)	245 lb (111 kg)	1978–02–02	UCLA
F	24	Richard Jefferson	6 ft 7 in (2.01 m)	234 lb (106 kg)	1980–06–21	Arizona
G	19	Damon Jones	6 ft 4 in (1.93 m)	200 lb (91 kg)	1976–08–25	Houston
F	12	Luc Mbah a Moute	6 ft 8 in (2.03 m)	230 lb (104 kg)	1986–09–09	UCLA
G	22	Michael Redd (injured) (IN)	6 ft 6 in (1.98 m)	215 lb (98 kg)	1979–08–24	Ohio State
G	13	Luke Ridnour	6 ft 2 in (1.88 m)	175 lb (79 kg)	1981–02–13	Oregon
G	7	Ramon Sessions	6 ft 3 in (1.91 m)	190 lb (86 kg)	1986–04–11	Nevada
F	31	Charlie Villanueva	6 ft 11 in (2.11 m)	237 lb (108 kg)	1984–08–24	Connecticut

Coaches
Head coach
- Scott Skiles
Assistant(s)
- Jim Boylan
- Bill Peterson
- Kelvin Sampson
- Joe Wolf
- Adrian Griffin

Legend
- (DP) Unsigned draft pick
- (FA) Free agent
- (S) Suspended
- Injured

== Pre-season ==
2008 pre-season game log
October: 1–7 (home: 1–3; road: 0–4)

Game	Date	Team	Score	High points	High rebounds	High assists	Location Attendance	Record
1	October 6	Minnesota Timberwolves	117–79	C. Villanueva (14)	F. Elson (8)	R. Sessions (6)	9,873	0-1 recap
2	October 8	@Detroit Pistons	71–85	C. Villanueva (20)	A. Bogut (8)	R. Sessions (10)	13,704	0-2 recap
3	October 10	Dallas Mavericks	105–79	R. Sessions (11)	D. Gadzuric (10)	L. Ridnour (6)	(La Crosse, Wisconsin); 4,289	0-3 recap
4	October 11	Detroit Pistons	111–99	C. Villanueva (26)	C. Villanueva (8)	M. Redd (8)	11,122	0-4 recap
5	October 15	Golden State Warriors	94–98	A. Bogut (18)	A. Bogut (12)	L. Ridnour (12)	(Guangzhou, China); 13,225	1-4 recap
6	October 17	@Golden State Warriors	108–109	C. Villanueva (26)	A. Bogut (9)	R. Jefferson (7)	(Beijing, China); 15,328	1-5 recap
7	October 23	@Minnesota Timberwolves	76–95	D. Gadzuric (13)	D. Gadzuric (11)	L. Ridnour (7)	8,850	1-6 recap
7	October 24	@Chicago Bulls	104–112 OT	R. Jefferson (21)	L. Mbah a Moute (10)	L. Ridnour (7)	21,529	1-7 recap

2008–09 season schedule

== Regular season ==
=== Standings ===
Central Division	W	L	PCT	GB	Home	Road	Div	GP
z-Cleveland Cavaliers	66	16	.805	—	39–2	27–14	13–3	82
x-Chicago Bulls	41	41	.500	25	28–13	13–28	9–7	82
x-Detroit Pistons	39	43	.476	27	21–20	18–23	7–9	82
Indiana Pacers	36	46	.439	30	25–16	11–30	7–9	82
Milwaukee Bucks	34	48	.415	32	22–19	12–29	4–12	82

#	Eastern Conference				
#	Team	W	L	PCT	GB
1	z-Cleveland Cavaliers	66	16	.805	—
2	y-Boston Celtics	62	20	.756	4
3	y-Orlando Magic	59	23	.720	7
4	x-Atlanta Hawks	47	35	.573	19
5	x-Miami Heat	43	39	.524	23
6	x-Philadelphia 76ers	41	41	.500	25
7	x-Chicago Bulls	41	41	.500	25
8	x-Detroit Pistons	39	43	.476	27
9	Indiana Pacers	36	46	.439	30
10	Charlotte Bobcats	35	47	.427	31
11	New Jersey Nets	34	48	.415	32
12	Milwaukee Bucks	34	48	.415	32
13	Toronto Raptors	33	49	.402	33
14	New York Knicks	32	50	.390	34
15	Washington Wizards	19	63	.232	47

=== Game log ===
2008–09 game log
October: 1–1 (home: 0–0; road: 1–1)

Game	Date	Team	Score	High points	High rebounds	High assists	Location Attendance	Record
1	October 28	@ Chicago	L 95–108	Michael Redd (30)	Andrew Bogut (7)	Charlie Bell, Tyronn Lue (5)	United Center; 21,762	0–1
2	October 29	@ Oklahoma City	W 98–87	Michael Redd, Richard Jefferson, Charlie Villanueva (20)	Charlie Villanueva (12)	Luke Ridnour (5)	Ford Center; 19,136	1–1

November: 6–11 (home: 3–4; road: 3–7)

Game	Date	Team	Score	High points	High rebounds	High assists	Location Attendance	Record
3	November 1	Toronto	L 87–91	Michael Redd (19)	Andrew Bogut (9)	Ramon Sessions (9)	Bradley Center; 17,036	1–2
4	November 2	@ New York	W 94–86	Richard Jefferson, Ramon Sessions (18)	Andrew Bogut (11)	Ramon Sessions (8)	Madison Square Garden; 18,190	2–2
5	November 5	Washington	W 112–104 (OT)	Richard Jefferson (32)	Andrew Bogut (13)	Luke Ridnour (11)	Bradley Center; 13,895	3–2
6	November 7	@ Boston	L 89–101	Richard Jefferson (20)	Charlie Villanueva (12)	Charlie Bell (5)	TD Banknorth Garden; 18,624	3–3
7	November 8	Phoenix	L 96–104	Ramon Sessions (23)	Andrew Bogut (11)	Luke Ridnour (7)	Bradley Center; 17,935	3–4
8	November 11	@ Cleveland	L 93–99	Richard Jefferson (19)	Charlie Villanueva (10)	Luke Ridnour, Charlie Villanueva, Ramon Sessions (4)	Quicken Loans Arena; 19,842	3–5
9	November 12	San Antonio	W 82–78	Richard Jefferson (19)	Andrew Bogut (17)	Andrew Bogut, Charlie Bell (4)	Bradley Center; 14,036	4–5
10	November 14	@ Memphis	W 101–96 (OT)	Richard Jefferson (26)	Luc Mbah a Moute (17)	Luke Ridnour (7)	FedExForum; 11,308	5–5
11	November 15	Boston	L 97–102 (OT)	Andrew Bogut (20)	Luc Mbah a Moute, Andrew Bogut (9)	Ramon Sessions (6)	Bradley Center; 17,952	5–6
12	November 18	@ Denver	L 105–114	Charlie Bell (25)	Austin Croshere, Ramon Sessions (6)	Ramon Sessions (6)	Pepsi Center; 14,413	5–7
13	November 19	@ Utah	L 94–105	Richard Jefferson (25)	Andrew Bogut (20)	Luke Ridnour (6)	EnergySolutions Arena; 19,911	5–8
14	November 21	New York	W 104–87	Charlie Villanueva (20)	Andrew Bogut (17)	Ramon Sessions (10)	Bradley Center; 14,898	6–8
15	November 22	@ Charlotte	W 79–74	Ramon Sessions (18)	Andrew Bogut (17)	Ramon Sessions, Andrew Bogut (4)	Time Warner Cable Arena; 12,096	7–8
16	November 24	@ Orlando	L 101–108	Richard Jefferson (25)	Charlie Villanueva (9)	Ramon Sessions (8)	Amway Arena; 16,245	7–9
17	November 26	@ Atlanta	L 96–102	Richard Jefferson (25)	Luc Mbah a Moute (8)	Ramon Sessions (8)	Philips Arena; 15,730	7–10
18	November 28	@ Detroit	L 97–107	Ramon Sessions, Richard Jefferson (21)	Dan Gadzuric (12)	Ramon Sessions, Charlie Bell, Luke Ridnour (4)	The Palace of Auburn Hills; 22,076	7–11
19	November 29	Cleveland	L 85–97	Michael Redd (20)	Charlie Villanueva (8)	Ramon Sessions (8)	Bradley Center; 16,237	7–12

December: 8–6 (home: 5–1; road: 3–5)

Game	Date	Team	Score	High points	High rebounds	High assists	Location Attendance	Record
20	December 3	Chicago	W 97–90	Charlie Villanueva (23)	Dan Gadzuric (14)	Luke Ridnour (10)	Bradley Center; 13,684	8–12
21	December 5	Charlotte	W 101–96	Michael Redd (25)	Andrew Bogut (10)	Luke Ridnour (6)	Bradley Center; 14,875	9–12
22	December 7	@ L.A. Lakers	L 92–105	Joe Alexander (15)	Andrew Bogut (9)	Ramon Sessions (6)	Staples Center; 18,997	9–13
23	December 9	@ Phoenix	L 110–125	Charlie Villanueva (24)	Andrew Bogut (11)	Luke Ridnour (10)	US Airways Center; 18,422	9–14
24	December 10	@ Golden State	L 96–119	Michael Redd (27)	Charlie Villanueva (11)	Luke Ridnour (5)	Oracle Arena; 18,375	9–15
25	December 13	Indiana	W 121–103	Michael Redd (27)	Andrew Bogut (20)	Luke Ridnour (6)	Bradley Center; 14,921	10–15
26	December 15	@ Miami	W 98–83	Michael Redd (21)	Andrew Bogut (11)	Michael Redd, Charlie Villanueva (5)	American Airlines Arena; 15,029	11–15
27	December 17	@ Philadelphia	L 88–93	Charlie Bell, Luke Ridnour (14)	Michael Redd, Andrew Bogut, Charlie Villanueva (8)	Michael Redd (5)	Wachovia Center; 11,538	11–16
28	December 19	@ New York	W 105–81	Michael Redd (21)	Andrew Bogut (13)	Luke Ridnour (7)	Madison Square Garden; 19,009	12–16
29	December 20	L.A. Clippers	W 119–85	Richard Jefferson (22)	Richard Jefferson, Luc Mbah a Moute (9)	Luke Ridnour (7)	Bradley Center; 15,014	13–16
30	December 23	Utah	W 94–86	Michael Redd (27)	Andrew Bogut (11)	Luke Ridnour (11)	Bradley Center; 14,888	14–16
31	December 27	Detroit	L 76–87	Andrew Bogut (17)	Andrew Bogut (10)	Luke Ridnour (5)	Bradley Center; 17,086	14–17
32	December 30	@ San Antonio	W 100–98	Michael Redd (25)	Andrew Bogut (14)	Luke Ridnour (6)	AT&T Center; 18,797	15–17
33	December 31	@ Houston	L 81–85	Michael Redd (20)	Andrew Bogut (9)	Luke Ridnour (11)	Toyota Center; 18,228	15–18

January: 9–9 (home: 6–3; road: 3–6)

Game	Date	Team	Score	High points	High rebounds	High assists	Location Attendance	Record
34	January 2	Charlotte	W 103–75	Michael Redd (31)	Luc Mbah a Moute (9)	Luke Ridnour (5)	Bradley Center; 15,107	16–18
35	January 3	@ Charlotte	L 92–102	Richard Jefferson (19)	Richard Jefferson, Charlie Villanueva (7)	Michael Redd (5)	Time Warner Cable Arena; 14,201	16–19
36	January 5	Toronto	W 107–97	Michael Redd (35)	Luc Mbah a Moute (11)	Ramon Sessions (8)	Bradley Center; 12,599	17–19
37	January 7	Philadelphia	L 105–110	Richard Jefferson (27)	Charlie Villanueva, Dan Gadzuric (7)	Michael Redd (7)	Bradley Center; 13,381	17–20
38	January 9	New Jersey	W 104–102	Michael Redd (24)	Luc Mbah a Moute (7)	Ramon Sessions (10)	Bradley Center; 15,768	18–20
39	January 10	@ Minnesota	L 104–106	Michael Redd (32)	Luke Ridnour (9)	Luke Ridnour (6)	Target Center; 15,007	18–21
40	January 12	@ Washington	W 97–91	Michael Redd (29)	Andrew Bogut, Luc Mbah a Moute (10)	Luke Ridnour (10)	Verizon Center; 13,510	19–21
41	January 14	Miami	L 99–102	Luke Ridnour (25)	Andrew Bogut (11)	Joe Alexander (5)	Bradley Center; 15,271	19–22
42	January 16	@ Sacramento	W 129–122	Michael Redd (44)	Charlie Villanueva (12)	Luke Ridnour (10)	ARCO Arena; 11,663	20–22
43	January 17	@ L.A. Clippers	L 92–101	Richard Jefferson (26)	Luc Mbah a Moute (6)	Luke Ridnour (8)	Staples Center; 16,448	20–23
44	January 19	@ Portland	L 85–102	Charlie Villanueva, Richard Jefferson (23)	Charlie Villanueva (10)	Tyronn Lue (4)	Rose Garden; 20,580	20–24
45	January 21	Dallas	W 133–99	Charlie Villanueva (32)	Charlie Villanueva (10)	Richard Jefferson (8)	Bradley Center; 13,898	21–24
46	January 23	@ Atlanta	L 87–117	Charlie Villanueva (27)	Luc Mbah a Moute (10)	Tyronn Lue, Michael Redd, Luke Ridnour (4)	Philips Arena; 18,556	21–25
47	January 24	Sacramento	W 106–104	Richard Jefferson (20)	Francisco Elson (12)	Luke Ridnour (8)	Bradley Center; 15,379	22–25
48	January 26	Minnesota	L 83–90	Ramon Sessions (18)	Richard Jefferson, Francisco Elson (9)	Luke Ridnour (9)	Bradley Center; 12,914	22–26
49	January 28	@ Indiana	L 99–107	Charlie Villanueva (28)	Charlie Villanueva (8)	Charlie Villanueva, Luke Ridnour (4)	Conseco Fieldhouse; 12,143	22–27
50	January 30	@ Toronto	W 96–85	Charlie Villanueva (26)	Charlie Villanueva (13)	Ramon Sessions (6)	Air Canada Centre; 18,791	23–27
51	January 31	Atlanta	W 110–107	Charlie Villanueva (27)	Francisco Elson (8)	Luke Ridnour (9)	Bradley Center; 15,881	24–27

February: 5–6 (home: 4–3; road: 1–3)

Game	Date	Team	Score	High points	High rebounds	High assists	Location Attendance	Record
52	February 3	@ New Jersey	L 85–99	Richard Jefferson (27)	Dan Gadzuric (9)	Luke Ridnour (7)	Izod Center; 10,102	24–28
53	February 7	Detroit	L 121–126 (OT)	Ramon Sessions (44)	Francisco Elson (8)	Ramon Sessions (12)	Bradley Center; 17,297	24–29
54	February 9	Houston	W 124–112	Ramon Sessions (26)	Charlie Villanueva (8)	Ramon Sessions (7)	Bradley Center; 13,904	25–29
55	February 11	Indiana	W 122–110	Richard Jefferson (32)	Luc Mbah a Moute (11)	Ramon Sessions (17)	Bradley Center; 13,486	26–29
56	February 17	@ Detroit	W 92–86	Richard Jefferson (29)	Ramon Sessions (9)	Ramon Sessions (7)	The Palace of Auburn Hills; 20,217	27–29
57	February 18	Chicago	L 104–113	Richard Jefferson (32)	Charlie Villanueva (12)	Ramon Sessions (4)	Bradley Center; 15,309	27–30
58	February 20	Cleveland	L 103–111	Charlie Villanueva (26)	Charlie Villanueva (13)	Luke Ridnour, Charlie Villanueva (6)	Bradley Center; 18,076	27–31
59	February 22	Denver	W 120–117	Charlie Villanueva (36)	Francisco Elson (7)	Ramon Sessions (8)	Bradley Center; 14,891	28–31
60	February 25	@ Dallas	L 96–116	Charlie Villanueva (25)	Charlie Villanueva (7)	Ramon Sessions, Luke Ridnour (6)	American Airlines Center; 19,558	28–32
61	February 27	@ New Orleans	L 94–95	Richard Jefferson (22)	Charlie Villanueva (7)	Richard Jefferson, Charlie Bell, Luke Ridnour (3)	New Orleans Arena; 17,621	28–33
62	February 28	Washington	W 109–93	Charlie Villanueva (25)	Dan Gadzuric (11)	Ramon Sessions (10)	Bradley Center; 15,970	29–33

March: 3–10 (home: 2–5; road: 1–5)

Game	Date	Team	Score	High points	High rebounds	High assists	Location Attendance	Record
63	March 3	New Jersey	L 95–99	Charlie Villanueva (24)	Charlie Villanueva (15)	Richard Jefferson, Luke Ridnour (6)	Bradley Center; 13,967	29–34
64	March 4	@ Cleveland	L 73–91	Richard Jefferson (29)	Charlie Villanueva (8)	Ramon Sessions (8)	Quicken Loans Arena; 20,562	29–35
65	March 6	@ Chicago	L 102–117	Richard Jefferson (27)	Charlie Villanueva (12)	Ramon Sessions (11)	United Center; 21,186	29–36
66	March 7	Golden State	W 127–120	Richard Jefferson (35)	Charlie Villanueva, Francisco Elson (7)	Ramon Sessions (9)	Bradley Center; 15,569	30–36
67	March 10	New York	L 112–120	Charlie Villanueva (32)	Charlie Villanueva (9)	Ramon Sessions (9)	Bradley Center; 13,781	30–37
68	March 13	New Orleans	L 86–95	Richard Jefferson (27)	Luc Mbah a Moute (10)	Ramon Sessions (7)	Bradley Center; 15,701	30–38
69	March 15	Boston	W 86–77	Charlie Villanueva (19)	Keith Bogans (12)	Ramon Sessions (7)	Bradley Center; 18,134	31–38
70	March 18	Orlando	L 80–106	Charlie Villanueva (17)	Ramon Sessions (7)	Ramon Sessions (5)	Bradley Center; 13,819	31–39
71	March 21	Portland	L 84–96	Charlie Villanueva (26)	Charlie Villanueva (9)	Ramon Sessions (7)	Bradley Center; 17,809	31–40
72	March 25	@ Toronto	L 106–115	Richard Jefferson (22)	Luc Mbah a Moute (8)	Charlie Bell, Ramon Sessions (7)	Air Canada Centre; 17,401	31–41
73	March 27	@ Orlando	L 94–110	Charlie Bell, Ramon Sessions (19)	Richard Jefferson, Francisco Elson (7)	Ramon Sessions (4)	Amway Arena; 17,461	31–42
74	March 28	@ Miami	L 85–102	Richard Jefferson (32)	Dan Gadzuric (12)	Ramon Sessions (8)	American Airlines Arena; 18,108	31–43
75	March 30	@ New Jersey	W 107–78	Richard Jefferson (29)	Richard Jefferson (10)	Ramon Sessions (8)	Izod Center; 12,205	32–43

April: 2–5 (home: 2–3; road: 0–2)

Game	Date	Team	Score	High points	High rebounds	High assists	Location Attendance	Record
76	April 1	L.A. Lakers	L 98–104	Richard Jefferson (29)	Ramon Sessions (10)	Ramon Sessions (16)	Bradley Center; 18,717	32–44
77	April 2	@ Philadelphia	L 95–105	Ramon Sessions (18)	Dan Gadzuric (6)	Ramon Sessions (10)	Wachovia Center; 17,640	32–45
78	April 4	Memphis	L 102–107	Richard Jefferson (24)	Charlie Bell (8)	Ramon Sessions (11)	Bradley Center; 18,717	32–46
79	April 8	Atlanta	L 105–113	Keith Bogans (22)	Charlie Villanueva (7)	Ramon Sessions (8)	Bradley Center; 13,073	32–47
80	April 11	Oklahoma City	W 115–98	Richard Jefferson (35)	Charlie Villanueva, Richard Jefferson (9)	Ramon Sessions (9)	Bradley Center; 15,418	33–47
81	April 13	Orlando	W 98–80	Richard Jefferson (24)	Ramon Sessions, Francisco Elson (8)	Richard Jefferson, Ramon Sessions (7)	Bradley Center; 14,683	34–47
82	April 15	@ Indiana	L 108–115	Richard Jefferson (31)	Luc Mbah a Moute (11)	Ramon Sessions (12)	Conseco Fieldhouse; 14,161	34–48

2008–09 schedule

== Playoffs ==
The Bucks failed to qualify for the playoffs for the third consecutive season.

== Player statistics ==
Legend
GP	Games played	GS	Games started	MPG	Minutes per game
FG%	Field-goal percentage	3P%	3-point field-goal percentage	FT%	Free-throw percentage
RPG	Rebounds per game	APG	Assists per game	SPG	Steals per game
BPG	Blocks per game	PPG	Points per game

Player	GP	GS	MPG	FG%	3FG%	FT%	RPG	APG	SPG	BPG	PPG
Joe Alexander	59	0	10.8	.424	.323	.761	1.8	0.6	0.2	0.4	4.1
Malik Allen	49	3	11.6	.423	.000	.450	2.0	0.7	0.1	0.2	3.0
Charlie Bell	70	23	24.5	.412	.358	.867	1.7	2.0	0.7	0.1	8.1
Keith Bogans	29	0	16.6	.329	.300	.952	3.1	0.9	0.8	0.1	5.7
Andrew Bogut	36	33	31.2	.577		.571	10.3	2.0	0.6	1.0	11.7
Austin Croshere	11	0	7.0	.400	.455	.636	2.2	0.5	0.1	0.1	3.3
Francisco Elson	59	23	15.7	.477	.333	.833	3.6	0.5	0.6	0.5	3.3
Dan Gadzuric	67	26	13.0	.453	.000	.542	3.5	0.7	0.5	0.7	3.4
Eddie Gill	6	0	7.2	.667	.667		0.7	1.8	0.5	0.2	2.3
Richard Jefferson	82	82	36.1	.434	.394	.799	4.6	2.4	0.8	0.2	18.8
Damon Jones	18	0	5.4	.214	.300		0.4	0.4	0.1	0.0	1.0
Tyronn Lue	30	0	13.1	.454	.467	.750	1.2	1.5	0.2	0.0	4.7
Luc Mbah a Moute	82	52	25.5	.473	.000	.740	6.0	0.9	1.1	0.6	7.3
Michael Redd	33	32	36.5	.455	.366	.814	3.2	2.7	1.1	0.1	21.2
Luke Ridnour	72	50	29.9	.408	.331	.881	3.3	5.5	1.4	0.3	10.2
Ramon Sessions	79	39	26.7	.447	.194	.788	3.2	5.0	1.0	0.1	12.3
Charlie Villanueva	78	47	26.8	.457	.376	.842	6.9	1.9	0.6	0.8	16.4

== Transactions ==
=== Overview ===
Players Added

Via draft

- Joe Alexander
- Luc Mbah a Moute

Via trade

- Keith Bogans
- Richard Jefferson
- Damon Jones
- Luke Ridnour

Via free agency

- Malik Allen
- Francisco Elson
Players Lost

Via trade

- Yi Jianlian
- Desmond Mason
- Bobby Simmons
- Mo Williams

Via free agency

- Royal Ivey
- Michael Ruffin
- Jake Voskuhl

=== Trades ===
June 26, 2008	To Milwaukee Bucks Richard Jefferson	To New Jersey Nets Yi Jianlian; Bobby Simmons
August 13, 2008	To Milwaukee Bucks Adrian Griffin; Damon Jones; Luke Ridnour	To Cleveland Cavaliers Mo Williams To Oklahoma City Thunder Desmond Mason; Joe Smith
February 5, 2009	To Milwaukee Bucks Keith Bogans	To Orlando Magic Tyronn Lue

=== Free agents ===
==== Additions ====
Player	Signed	Former team
Tyronn Lue	July 17, 2008	Dallas Mavericks
Malik Allen	July 17, 2008	Dallas Mavericks
Francisco Elson	September 9, 2008	Seattle SuperSonics

==== Subtractions ====
Player	Left	New team
Austin Croshere	January 6	free agent
