= 2008–09 Toronto Raptors season =

NBA professional basketball team season

- Head coach: Sam Mitchell (fired); Jay Triano
- General manager: Bryan Colangelo
- Owners: Maple Leaf Sports & Entertainment
- Arena: Air Canada Centre

Results
- Record: 33–49 (.402)
- Place: Division: 4th (Atlantic); Conference: 13th (Eastern)
- Playoff finish: Did not qualify
- Stats at Basketball Reference

Local media
- Television: Rogers Sportsnet; Raptors NBA TV; TSN; TSN2; The Score; CBLT-DT
- Radio: CJCL

The 2008–09 Toronto Raptors season is the 14th season of the franchise in the National Basketball Association (NBA). Before the season began, six-time NBA All-Star and center Jermaine O'Neal was acquired to complement Chris Bosh in the frontcourt. 17 games into the season, head coach Sam Mitchell was fired and replaced by Jay Triano. The Raptors went into the All-Star break 13 games under .500, and O'Neal was traded to Miami for Shawn Marion. The Raptors continued to struggle, and were eliminated from the playoff race with seven games of the regular season remaining.

== Roster ==
2008–09 Toronto Raptors roster
Players

Pos.	No.	Player	Height	Weight	DOB	From
PG	3	Marcus Banks	6 ft 2 in (1.88 m)	200 lb (91 kg)	1981-11-19	UNLV
PF	7	Andrea Bargnani	7 ft 0 in (2.13 m)	225 lb (102 kg)	1985-10-26	Italy
C	4	Chris Bosh	6 ft 11 in (2.11 m)	235 lb (107 kg)	1984-03-24	Georgia Tech
PG	8	José Calderón	6 ft 3 in (1.91 m)	210 lb (95 kg)	1981-09-28	Spain
PG	5	Quincy Douby	6 ft 3 in (1.91 m)	175 lb (79 kg)	1984-05-16	Rutgers
SF	14	Joey Graham	6 ft 7 in (2.01 m)	225 lb (102 kg)	1982-06-11	Oklahoma State
SF	43	Kris Humphries	6 ft 9 in (2.06 m)	235 lb (107 kg)	1985-02-06	Minnesota
PF	21	Nathan Jawai	6 ft 10 in (2.08 m)	280 lb (127 kg)	1986-10-10	Midland College
SG	24	Jason Kapono	6 ft 8 in (2.03 m)	213 lb (97 kg)	1981-02-04	UCLA
SF	31	Shawn Marion	6 ft 7 in (2.01 m)	220 lb (100 kg)	1978-05-07	UNLV
PF	44	Pops Mensah-Bonsu	6 ft 9 in (2.06 m)	240 lb (109 kg)	1983-09-07	George Washington
C	13	Patrick O'Bryant	7 ft 0 in (2.13 m)	260 lb (118 kg)	1986-06-20	Bradley
SG	18	Anthony Parker	6 ft 6 in (1.98 m)	215 lb (98 kg)	1975-06-19	Bradley
PG	1	Roko Ukić	6 ft 5 in (1.96 m)	183 lb (83 kg)	1984-05-12	Croatia
C	77	Jake Voskuhl	6 ft 11 in (2.11 m)	245 lb (111 kg)	1977-11-01	Connecticut

Coaches
Head coach
- Sam Mitchell (fired)
- Jay Triano
Assistant(s)
- Alex English
- Mike Evans
- Gordon Herbert

Legend
- (DP) Unsigned draft pick
- (FA) Free agent
- (S) Suspended
- (DL) On assignment to D-League affiliate
- Injured

Roster
Updated: April 20, 2009

=== Roster notes ===
- Center Patrick O'Bryant was born and raised in the U.S., but is also a Central African citizen.

== Summary ==
=== Preseason ===
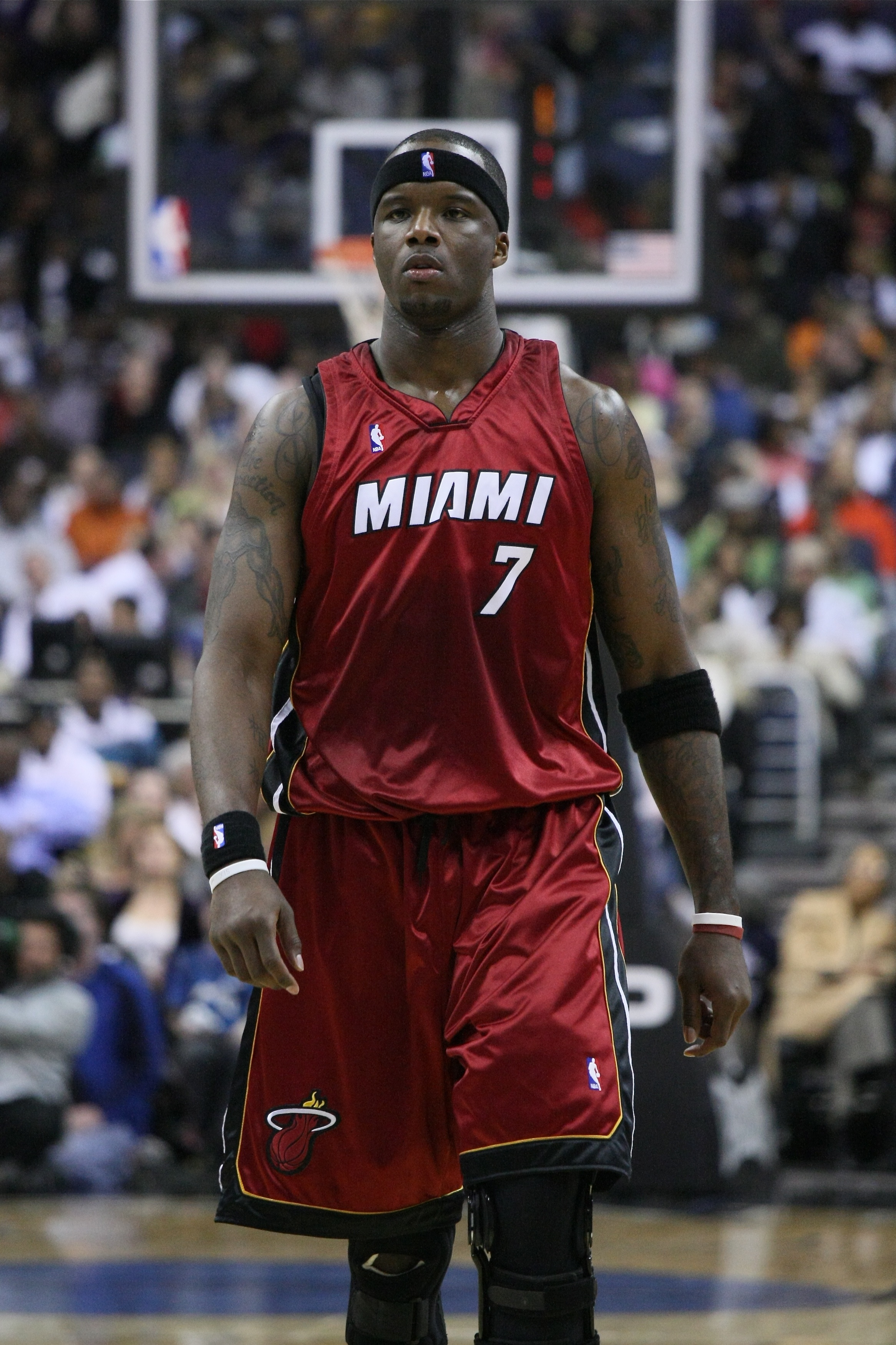
Jermaine O'Neal, six-time NBA All-Star, was acquired from Indiana before the season began

Seeking to improve its rebounding and interior defence, Toronto traded T. J. Ford, Radoslav Nesterović, Maceo Baston, and the draft rights to Roy Hibbert to the Indiana Pacers in return for six-time NBA All-Star Jermaine O'Neal and the draft rights to Nathan Jawai. With Ford gone, virtually all the point guard responsibilities rested on José Calderón's shoulders, who re-signed to a multi-year contract. The Raptors then signed free agents Hassan Adams, Will Solomon and Jamal Sampson, but Sampson was waived at the end of the pre-season. The Raptors also signed Roko Ukić who was drafted in the 2005 NBA draft, and lost Carlos Delfino and Primož Brezec to free agency. O'Neal's arrival, however, was dwarfed by the Elton Brand signing pulled off by division rivals Philadelphia. In a pre-season poll, more than half of the general managers predicted the acquisition of Brand to be the most significant one in the league, whereas the 30-year-old O'Neal was perceived to be past his prime. Nevertheless, the prospect of Toronto deploying two proven big men at the post with some of the league's best three-point shooters waiting at the perimeter signalled a change in game plan from the previous campaign.

=== Regular season ===
"This year you don't see a lot of (Raptors) helping (opponents) up. We're not going to do that. We're going to step over guys if we knock 'em down. And that's the way it should be."

-O'Neal

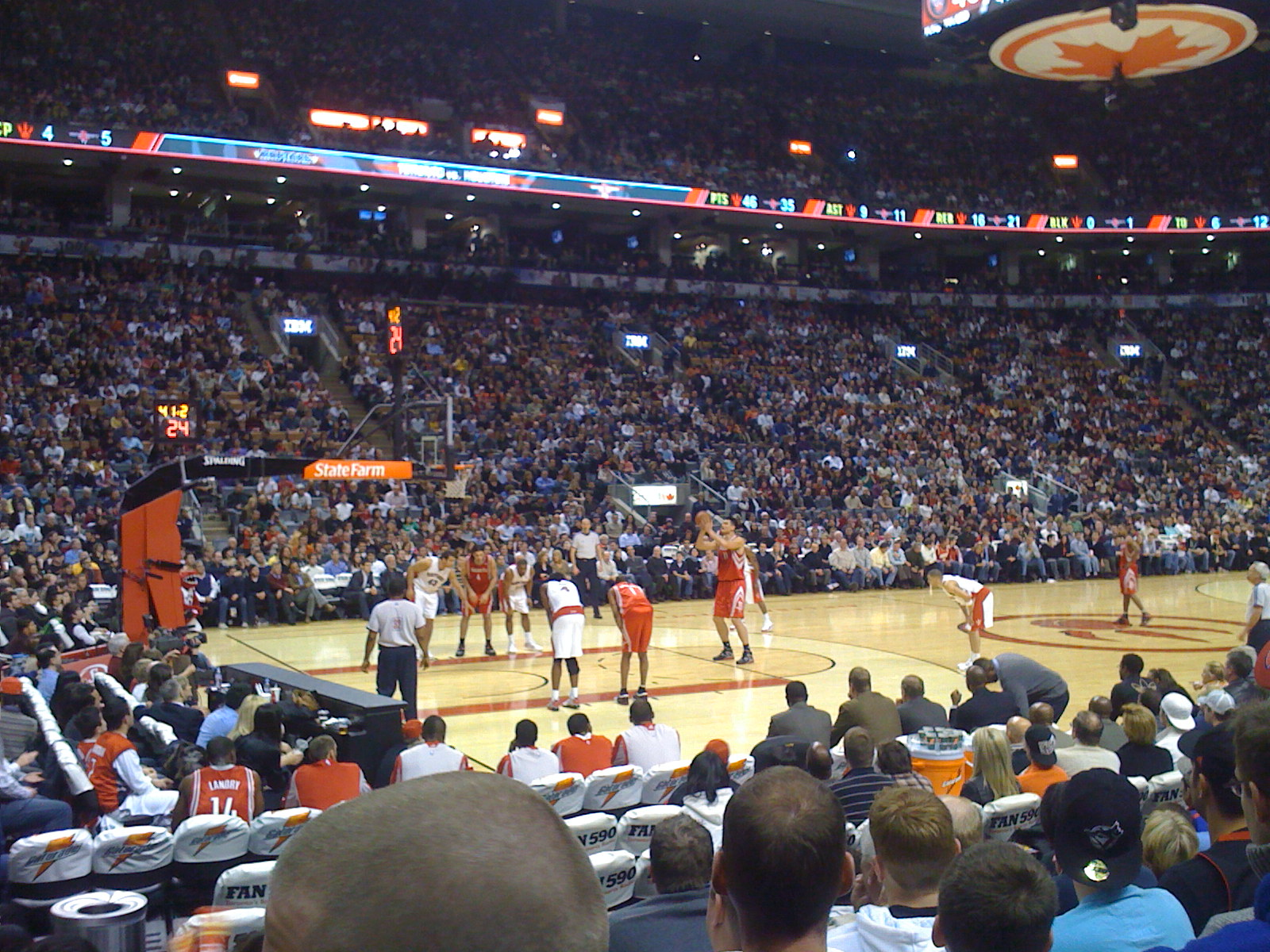
The Raptors in a home game against the Houston Rockets

The Raptors began their campaign with a 95–84 road win against Philadelphia. The match featured the new All-Star acquisitions of both teams: O'Neal for the Raptors and Brand for the 76ers. Chris Bosh and O'Neal combined for 44 points and 19 rebounds in the win. The team notched another victory in their second game—a home fixture against the Golden State Warriors—thus opening with the same 2–0 record as the season before. Andrea Bargnani, who had spent the summer buffing up his frame and working on his interior game, chalked up 5 rebounds and 3 blocks in the game that went into overtime. The Raptors then got off to their best start in four seasons when they defeated the Milwaukee Bucks in the third game, with Calderón scoring a career-high 25 points in the 91–87 win. Meanwhile, O'Neal wasted no time in imposing his style on his new team: in the season opener at Philadelphia, he pointed to hecklers in the home crowd after making a dunk; in the team's second game, he blocked a dunk from Golden State's Brandan Wright and thereafter waved a finger, as though to say "Don't come back here again."

However, the Raptors could not keep up their new game plan of solid defence and lost four of their next five games, including a blowout loss to the Atlanta Hawks and another to the Boston Celtics after relinquishing a 17-point lead. While Bosh posted impressive numbers in nearly every game, his teammates were not as consistent. Toronto's depth at the point was soon put to the test when Calderón was injured and unable to play against the rising Miami Heat. Solomon took over the reins with ease in that game and coupled with the Raptors' domination in the frontcourt led by O'Neal, Toronto secured a much needed win. Moon was also dropped to the bench, with Bargnani made the starting small forward. This performance came to naught in the next game against the Orlando Magic, where although Bosh and O'Neal combined for 54 points and 28 boards, the lack of production and defence from the wing, coupled with the inability to protect possession, brought Toronto back to .500. As though to prove a point, Bargnani and Anthony Parker combined for 44 points the next day in the win against Miami, while the tandem of Bosh and O'Neal secured 28 rebounds. This run was not sustained yet again, as Toronto lost a further two games on the trot: an overtime loss to New Jersey and another blowout loss to Boston, where the Raptors set a franchise record for highest field goal percentage (62%) conceded at home. That game also saw Bosh unleash a bout of angry frustration at his team as the Raptors plummeted to the bottom of the division standings.

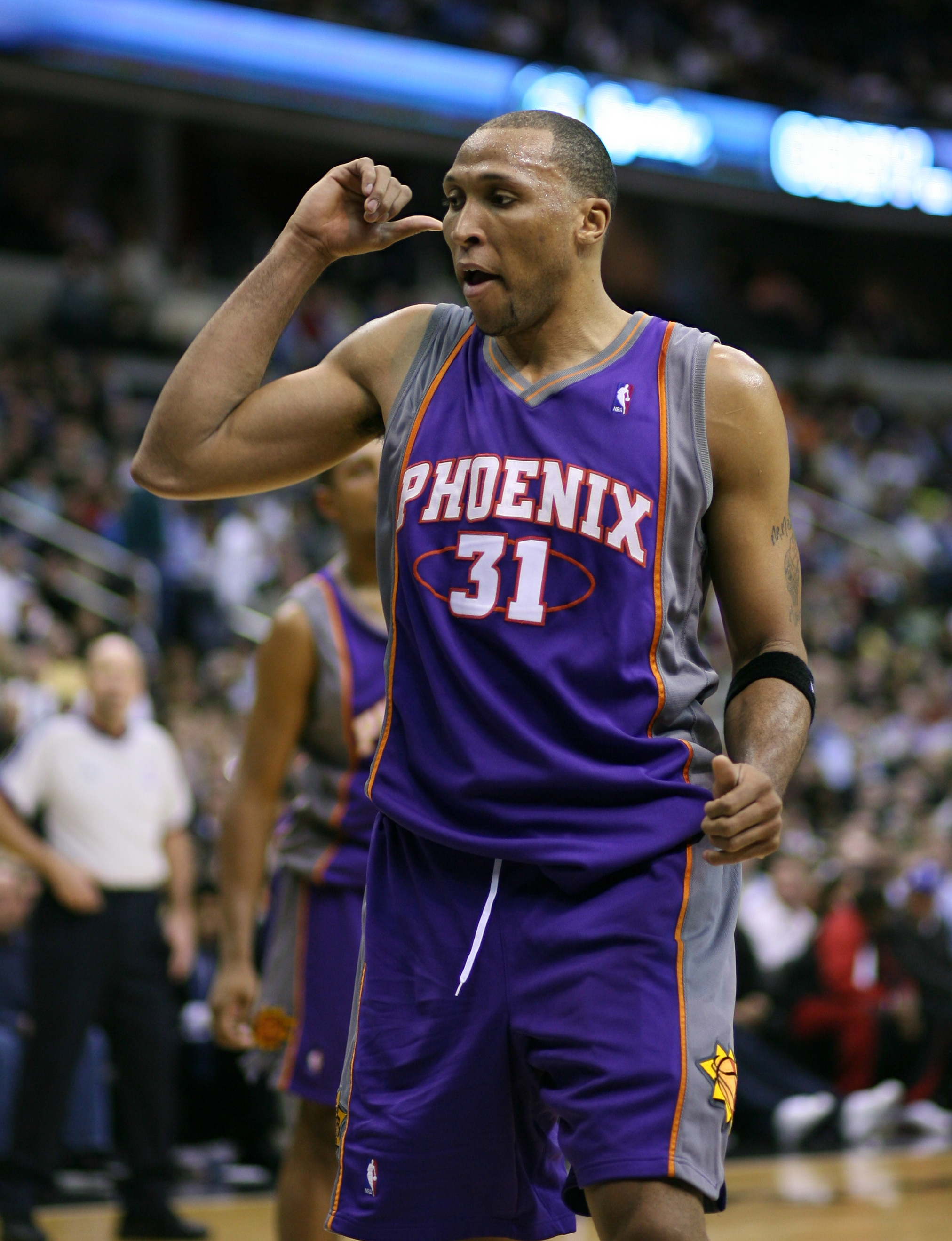
O'Neal was traded for four-time NBA All-Star Marion after the All-Star break

On 3 December 2008, with the Raptors posting an 8–9 record 17 games into the season, Raptors' head coach Sam Mitchell was fired and replaced by longtime assistant Jay Triano on an interim basis. Triano—the first Canadian head coach in NBA history—immediately pointed to Toronto's bottom-of-the-league in fast break points as a major deficiency he wanted to overcome. However, the Raptors slipped a further three games to go 8–12 before it recovered with a two-game turnaround. In those two games, Triano attempted to introduce a new style of play: maximum protection of the paint. He also brought Kapono and Moon into the starting line-up and this seemed to work for a while before Toronto lost the next five games to go seven under .500, including a loss to the 2–24 Oklahoma City Thunder. Toronto ended up 4–11 in December under Triano, but got off to a good start in January with wins over Houston and Orlando before going down in a crucial game against Milwaukee. January also saw Bargnani emerging as a legitimate starting center with him averaging over 21 points and 6.6 rebounds over a 16-game stretch and Ukić showing good signs of adaptation to the NBA, but all this was overshadowed by the injuries that O'Neal and Calderón sustained and the resulting mounting losses. Given the Raptors' perpetual inability to win close games and hold on to leads, the team went on a seven-game losing streak before the return of O'Neal and Calderón saw them move to 19–28. Toronto then went on a six-game losing streak and dropped further down the pecking order with a 21–34 record going into the All-Star break. With Toronto looking to bring in a wing player and free up the salary space, O'Neal and Moon were traded to Miami for Shawn Marion and Marcus Banks on 13 February 2009. Six days later, Solomon was moved in a three-way deal, resulting in Toronto acquiring a big man in centre Patrick O'Bryant from Boston. Pops Mensah-Bonsu and Quincy Douby were also signed on 6 March and 24 March 2009 respectively.

"It's just a toughness thing... There's an old saying that you 'fake it until you make it.' If you're not tough, you can go out there and pretend you're tough long enough until people start believing you. It's amazing how many times something like that will actually scare people or deter people."

-Triano, after the Raptors failed to qualify for the playoffs

Even with the new acquisitions, Toronto continued losing games, one of which was a blowout 97–127 loss to New York. Combined with a seven-game losing streak leading up to mid-March, this evaporated any hopes of making the playoffs. The only improvement came in the form of more fastbreak points and points scored in the paint, and the team even kickstarted a six-game winning streak in the last week of March, their longest winning streak in seven seasons. The Raptors were also eliminated from playoffs contention at the same time when the streak ended, with seven games of the regular season to go. They ended the season with a three-game winning streak, an overall record of 33–49, and were ranked 13th in the Conference.

== Standings ==
Atlantic Division	W	L	PCT	GB	Home	Road	Div
y-Boston Celtics	62	20	.756	—	35–6	27–14	15–1
x-Philadelphia 76ers	41	41	.500	21	24–17	17–24	6–10
New Jersey Nets	34	48	.415	28	19–22	15–26	8–8
Toronto Raptors	33	49	.402	29	18–23	15–26	6–10
New York Knicks	32	50	.390	30	20–21	12–29	5–11

#	Eastern Conference				
#	Team	W	L	PCT	GB
1	z-Cleveland Cavaliers	66	16	.805	—
2	y-Boston Celtics	62	20	.756	4
3	y-Orlando Magic	59	23	.720	7
4	x-Atlanta Hawks	47	35	.573	19
5	x-Miami Heat	43	39	.524	23
6	x-Philadelphia 76ers	41	41	.500	25
7	x-Chicago Bulls	41	41	.500	25
8	x-Detroit Pistons	39	43	.476	27
9	Indiana Pacers	36	46	.439	30
10	Charlotte Bobcats	35	47	.427	31
11	New Jersey Nets	34	48	.415	32
12	Milwaukee Bucks	34	48	.415	32
13	Toronto Raptors	33	49	.402	33
14	New York Knicks	32	50	.390	34
15	Washington Wizards	19	63	.232	47

== Game log ==
=== Regular season ===
2008–09 game log
October: 2–0 (home: 1–0; road: 1–0)

Game	Date	Team	Score	High points	High rebounds	High assists	Location Attendance	Record
1	October 29	@ Philadelphia	W 95–84	Chris Bosh (27)	Chris Bosh (11)	José Calderón (7)	Wachovia Center; 15,750	1–0
2	October 31	Golden State	W 112–108 (OT)	Chris Bosh (31)	Chris Bosh (9)	José Calderón (13)	Air Canada Centre; 19,800	2–0

November: 6–8 (home: 3–4; road: 3–4)

Game	Date	Team	Score	High points	High rebounds	High assists	Location Attendance	Record
3	November 1	@ Milwaukee	W 91–87	José Calderón (25)	Chris Bosh (10)	José Calderón (9)	Bradley Center; 17,036	3–0
4	November 5	Detroit	L 93–100	Chris Bosh (26)	Chris Bosh (13)	José Calderón (8)	Air Canada Centre; 18,602	3–1
5	November 7	@ Atlanta	L 92–110	Chris Bosh (26)	Chris Bosh (8)	José Calderón (12)	Philips Arena; 18,290	3–2
6	November 9	@ Charlotte	W 89–79	Chris Bosh (30)	Chris Bosh (15)	José Calderón (7)	Time Warner Cable Arena; 12,111	4–2
7	November 10	@ Boston	L 87–94	Jermaine O'Neal (23)	Jermaine O'Neal (11)	José Calderón (10)	TD Banknorth Garden; 18,624	4–3
8	November 12	Philadelphia	L 96–106	Chris Bosh (30)	Chris Bosh (12)	José Calderón (6)	Air Canada Centre; 18,093	4–4
9	November 16	Miami	W 107–96	Chris Bosh (27)	Jermaine O'Neal (18)	Will Solomon (11)	Air Canada Centre; 19,800	5–4
10	November 18	@ Orlando	L 90–103	Chris Bosh (40)	Chris Bosh (18)	Chris Bosh, Will Solomon (4)	Amway Arena; 16,353	5–5
11	November 19	@ Miami	W 101–95	Andrea Bargnani (25)	Jermaine O'Neal (17)	José Calderón (7)	American Airlines Arena; 15,014	6–5
12	November 21	New Jersey	L 127–129 (OT)	Chris Bosh (42)	Andrea Bargnani (10)	José Calderón (15)	Air Canada Centre; 19,800	6–6
13	November 23	Boston	L 103–118	Chris Bosh (24)	Andrea Bargnani (7)	José Calderón (9)	Air Canada Centre; 19,800	6–7
14	November 26	Charlotte	W 93–86	Chris Bosh (39)	Chris Bosh (11)	José Calderón (9)	Air Canada Centre; 17,414	7–7
15	November 28	Atlanta	W 93–88	Chris Bosh (30)	Chris Bosh (10)	José Calderón (11)	Air Canada Centre; 19,200	8–7
16	November 30	@ L.A. Lakers	L 99–112	Anthony Parker (19)	Andrea Bargnani (11)	José Calderón (12)	Staples Center; 18,997	8–8

December: 4–12 (home: 1–5; road: 3–7)

Game	Date	Team	Score	High points	High rebounds	High assists	Location Attendance	Record
17	December 2	@ Denver	L 93–132	Chris Bosh (24)	Chris Bosh (12)	José Calderón (7)	Pepsi Center; 14,243	8–9
18	December 5	@ Utah	L 87–114	Chris Bosh (18)	Chris Bosh (11)	José Calderón (8)	EnergySolutions Arena; 19,911	8–10
19	December 7	Portland	L 97–98	Jermaine O'Neal (24)	Jermaine O'Neal (8)	José Calderón (13)	Air Canada Centre; 17,671	8–11
20	December 9	@ Cleveland	L 94–114	Joey Graham (17)	Chris Bosh (11)	Jermaine O'Neal (4)	Quicken Loans Arena; 20,049	8–12
21	December 10	Indiana	W 101–88	Jason Kapono (25)	Chris Bosh (10)	José Calderón (14)	Air Canada Centre; 17,877	9–12
22	December 12	@ New Jersey	W 101–79	Chris Bosh (18)	Jamario Moon (9)	Roko Ukić (5)	Izod Center; 13,926	10–12
23	December 14	New Orleans	L 91–99	Chris Bosh (25)	Chris Bosh, Jamario Moon (8)	José Calderón (7)	Air Canada Centre; 18,537	10–13
24	December 15	New Jersey	L 87–94	Chris Bosh, Jason Kapono (17)	Chris Bosh, Jamario Moon (9)	José Calderón (8)	Air Canada Centre; 18,561	10–14
25	December 17	Dallas	L 86–96	Jermaine O'Neal (19)	Chris Bosh, Jamario Moon (9)	José Calderón (10)	Air Canada Centre; 18,832	10–15
26	December 19	@ Oklahoma City	L 83–91	Chris Bosh (22)	Chris Bosh (16)	José Calderón (8)	Ford Center; 18,806	10–16
27	December 20	@ San Antonio	L 97–107	Jermaine O'Neal (24)	Chris Bosh, Jermaine O'Neal (10)	Chris Bosh, José Calderón (4)	AT&T Center; 17,227	10–17
28	December 22	@ L.A. Clippers	W 97–75	Chris Bosh (31)	Jermaine O'Neal (9)	José Calderón (9)	Staples Center; 16,094	11–17
29	December 26	@ Sacramento	W 107–101	Jermaine O'Neal (36)	Jermaine O'Neal (9)	José Calderón (6)	ARCO Arena; 12,059	12–17
30	December 27	@ Portland	L 89–102	Chris Bosh (29)	Chris Bosh (9)	José Calderón (8)	Rose Garden Arena; 20,588	12–18
31	December 29	@ Golden State	L 111–117	Chris Bosh (30)	Chris Bosh (14)	José Calderón (16)	Oracle Arena; 19,596	12–19
32	December 31	Denver	L 107–114	Andrea Bargnani (26)	Chris Bosh (11)	José Calderón (11)	Air Canada Centre; 18,879	12–20

January: 7–9 (home: 4–4; road: 3–5)

Game	Date	Team	Score	High points	High rebounds	High assists	Location Attendance	Record
33	January 2	Houston	W 94–73	Andrea Bargnani, Chris Bosh (19)	Anthony Parker, Jake Voskuhl (8)	Will Solomon (7)	Air Canada Centre; 19,800	13–20
34	January 4	Orlando	W 108–102	Anthony Parker (26)	Chris Bosh (11)	Roko Ukić (7)	Air Canada Centre; 19,322	14–20
35	January 5	@ Milwaukee	L 97–107	Chris Bosh (31)	Chris Bosh (11)	Will Solomon (11)	Bradley Center; 12,599	14–21
36	January 7	@ Washington	W 99–93	Andrea Bargnani (25)	Chris Bosh, Joey Graham (8)	Chris Bosh (6)	Verizon Center; 13,864	15–21
37	January 9	Memphis	W 103–82	Chris Bosh (32)	Chris Bosh (10)	Will Solomon (9)	Air Canada Centre; 18,486	16–21
38	January 11	Boston	L 88–94	Andrea Bargnani (17)	Chris Bosh (11)	Andrea Bargnani, José Calderón, Will Solomon, Roko Ukić (3)	Air Canada Centre; 19,800	16–22
39	January 12	@ Boston	L 109–115 (OT)	Andrea Bargnani (23)	Chris Bosh (11)	Will Solomon (5)	TD Banknorth Garden; 18,624	16–23
40	January 14	Chicago	L 98–102	Andrea Bargnani (31)	Andrea Bargnani (10)	Will Solomon (7)	Air Canada Centre; 18,494	16–24
41	January 16	@ Indiana	L 104–111	Chris Bosh (25)	Chris Bosh (16)	Anthony Parker (5)	Conseco Fieldhouse; 13,234	16–25
42	January 18	Phoenix	L 113–117	Anthony Parker (26)	Chris Bosh (12)	Anthony Parker (5)	Air Canada Centre; 19,800	16–26
43	January 19	@ Atlanta	L 84–87	Chris Bosh (22)	Chris Bosh (14)	Anthony Parker (9)	Philips Arena; 17,199	16–27
44	January 21	@ Detroit	L 76–95	Chris Bosh (19)	Jamario Moon (7)	Anthony Parker (8)	The Palace of Auburn Hills; 22,076	16–28
45	January 23	@ Chicago	W 114–94	José Calderón (23)	Chris Bosh (6)	José Calderón (10)	United Center; 20,886	17–28
46	January 25	Sacramento	W 113–97	Chris Bosh (31)	Jermaine O'Neal (10)	José Calderón (8)	Air Canada Centre; 18,127	18–28
47	January 28	@ New Jersey	W 107–106	Anthony Parker (21)	Anthony Parker (7)	José Calderón (11)	Izod Center; 10,138	19–28
48	January 30	Milwaukee	L 85–96	Chris Bosh (18)	Chris Bosh (9)	José Calderón (11)	Air Canada Centre; 18,791	19–29

February: 4–8 (home: 3–3; road: 1–5)

Game	Date	Team	Score	High points	High rebounds	High assists	Location Attendance	Record
49	February 1	Orlando	L 90–113	José Calderón (16)	Joey Graham (12)	José Calderón, Will Solomon (5)	Air Canada Centre; 19,800	19–30
50	February 3	@ Cleveland	L 83–101	Chris Bosh (29)	Andrea Bargnani (10)	Anthony Parker (8)	Quicken Loans Arena; 20,562	19–31
51	February 4	L.A. Lakers	L 107–115	Joey Graham (24)	Andrea Bargnani, Jermaine O'Neal (9)	Anthony Parker (9)	Air Canada Centre; 19,800	19–32
52	February 6	@ New Orleans	L 92–101	Jermaine O'Neal (24)	Jamario Moon (7)	José Calderón (9)	New Orleans Arena; 17,319	19–33
53	February 7	@ Memphis	L 70–78	José Calderón (18)	Andrea Bargnani, Jamario Moon (9)	José Calderón (5)	FedExForum; 11,498	19–34
54	February 10	@ Minnesota	W 110–102	Joey Graham (24)	Jamario Moon (9)	José Calderón (9)	Target Center; 12,722	20–34
55	February 11	San Antonio	W 91–89	Andrea Bargnani (23)	Jermaine O'Neal (10)	Anthony Parker (4)	Air Canada Centre; 18,909	21–34
56	February 18	Cleveland	L 76–93	Joey Graham (15)	Anthony Parker (7)	Shawn Marion (6)	Air Canada Centre; 19,800	21–35
57	February 20	@ New York	L 97–127	Joey Graham (19)	Shawn Marion (12)	José Calderón (10)	Madison Square Garden; 19,763	21–36
58	February 22	New York	W 111–100	Andrea Bargnani (28)	Shawn Marion (15)	José Calderón (11)	Air Canada Centre; 19,800	22–36
59	February 24	Minnesota	W 118–110	Andrea Bargnani, Chris Bosh (26)	Shawn Marion (8)	José Calderón (13)	Air Canada Centre; 17,457	23–36
60	February 27	@ Phoenix	L 113–133	Shawn Marion (27)	Shawn Marion (12)	José Calderón (5)	US Airways Center; 18,422	23–37

March: 5–8 (home: 5–4; road: 0–4)

Game	Date	Team	Score	High points	High rebounds	High assists	Location Attendance	Record
61	March 1	@ Dallas	L 98–109	Chris Bosh (28)	Chris Bosh (10)	Anthony Parker (7)	American Airlines Center; 19,688	23–38
62	March 3	@ Houston	L 97–107	Andrea Bargnani, Chris Bosh (25)	Shawn Marion (10)	José Calderón (16)	Toyota Center; 16,291	23–39
63	March 6	Miami	L 102–108	Chris Bosh (34)	Pops Mensah-Bonsu (10)	Anthony Parker (9)	Air Canada Centre; 19,800	23–40
64	March 8	Utah	L 101–109	Chris Bosh (30)	Chris Bosh (10)	José Calderón (11)	Air Canada Centre; 18,541	23–41
65	March 11	@ Philadelphia	L 106–115	Andrea Bargnani (21)	Pops Mensah-Bonsu (8)	José Calderón (6)	Wachovia Center; 17,292	23–42
66	March 13	Detroit	L 95–99 (OT)	Chris Bosh (27)	Chris Bosh, Pops Mensah-Bonsu (10)	José Calderón (11)	Air Canada Centre; 19,800	23–43
67	March 15	Indiana	W 110–87	Andrea Bargnani (27)	Chris Bosh (13)	José Calderón (12)	Air Canada Centre; 18,169	24–43
68	March 16	@ Charlotte	L 86–112	Chris Bosh (18)	Chris Bosh (14)	José Calderón (8)	Time Warner Cable Arena; 11,349	24–44
69	March 20	Charlotte	L 89–102	Chris Bosh (35)	Andrea Bargnani, Chris Bosh (7)	José Calderón (11)	Air Canada Centre; 18,641	24–45
70	March 22	L.A. Clippers	W 100–76	Chris Bosh (16)	Chris Bosh, Shawn Marion (13)	Roko Ukić (8)	Air Canada Centre; 17,610	25–45
71	March 25	Milwaukee	W 115–106	Andrea Bargnani (23)	Chris Bosh (14)	José Calderón (11)	Air Canada Centre; 17,401	26–45
72	March 27	Oklahoma City	W 112–96	Chris Bosh (21)	Chris Bosh (13)	Roko Ukić (10)	Air Canada Centre; 17,127	27–45
73	March 29	Chicago	W 134–129 (OT)	Chris Bosh (31)	Chris Bosh (15)	José Calderón (19)	Air Canada Centre; 18,949	28–45

April: 5–4 (home: 1–3; road: 4–1)

Game	Date	Team	Score	High points	High rebounds	High assists	Location Attendance	Record
74	April 1	@ Orlando	W 99–95	Chris Bosh (24)	Shawn Marion (15)	José Calderón (8)	Amway Arena; 17,461	29–45
75	April 4	@ New York	W 102–95	Andrea Bargnani (23)	Chris Bosh, Shawn Marion (13)	José Calderón (7)	Madison Square Garden; 19,763	30–45
76	April 5	New York	L 103–112	Chris Bosh (31)	Chris Bosh (14)	José Calderón (6)	Air Canada Centre; 18,879	30–46
77	April 7	Atlanta	L 110–118	Chris Bosh (21)	Chris Bosh (10)	José Calderón (13)	Air Canada Centre; 17,613	30–47
78	April 8	@ Indiana	L 101–130	Chris Bosh (21)	Chris Bosh (9)	Roko Ukić (7)	Conseco Fieldhouse; 13,647	30–48
79	April 10	Washington	L 98–100	Chris Bosh (21)	Chris Bosh (10)	José Calderón (11)	Air Canada Centre; 18,107	30–49
80	April 12	Philadelphia	W 111–104	Chris Bosh (22)	Chris Bosh (8)	José Calderón (11)	Air Canada Centre; 18,018	31–49
81	April 13	@ Washington	W 97–96	Chris Bosh, Shawn Marion (25)	Chris Bosh, Shawn Marion (15)	José Calderón (12)	Verizon Center; 18,455	32–49
82	April 15	@ Chicago	W 109–98	Shawn Marion (34)	Chris Bosh (19)	José Calderón (14)	United Center; 20,677	33–49

2008–09 season schedule

== Player statistics ==
=== Ragular season ===
Player	POS	GP	GS	MP	REB	AST	STL	BLK	PTS	MPG	RPG	APG	SPG	BPG	PPG
Anthony Parker	SG	80	71	2,637	317	269	100	15	857	33.0	4.0	3.4	1.3	.2	10.7
Jason Kapono	SG	80	12	1,831	163	105	22	3	654	22.9	2.0	1.3	.3	.0	8.2
Andrea Bargnani	PF	78	59	2,453	416	94	34	97	1,202	31.4	5.3	1.2	.4	1.2	15.4
Joey Graham	SF	78	10	1,541	292	48	35	12	597	19.8	3.7	.6	.4	.2	7.7
Chris Bosh	C	77	77	2,928	771	191	67	77	1,746	38.0	10.0	2.5	.9	1.0	22.7
Roko Ukić	PG	72	0	890	75	153	30	2	301	12.4	1.0	2.1	.4	.0	4.2
José Calderón	PG	68	68	2,333	194	607	74	7	873	34.3	2.9	8.9	1.1	.1	12.8
Jamario Moon^{†}	SF	54	39	1,379	249	70	65	44	393	25.5	4.6	1.3	1.2	.8	7.3
Jermaine O'Neal^{†}	C	41	34	1,216	288	67	18	82	555	29.7	7.0	1.6	.4	2.0	13.5
Will Solomon^{†}	PG	39	9	544	43	123	20	4	193	13.9	1.1	3.2	.5	.1	4.9
Jake Voskuhl	C	38	1	240	59	8	3	4	35	6.3	1.6	.2	.1	.1	.9
Kris Humphries	SF	29	0	265	70	10	8	6	114	9.1	2.4	.3	.3	.2	3.9
Shawn Marion^{†}	SF	27	27	954	224	62	31	21	386	35.3	8.3	2.3	1.1	.8	14.3
Pops Mensah-Bonsu^{†}	PF	19	0	263	103	6	8	4	96	13.8	5.4	.3	.4	.2	5.1
Patrick O'Bryant^{†}	C	13	3	147	32	3	3	11	61	11.3	2.5	.2	.2	.8	4.7
Hassan Adams	SG	12	0	52	7	1	1	1	11	4.3	.6	.1	.1	.1	.9
Quincy Douby^{†}	PG	7	0	73	7	12	3	0	31	10.4	1.0	1.7	.4	.0	4.4
Marcus Banks^{†}	PG	6	0	40	3	6	1	0	14	6.7	.5	1.0	.2	.0	2.3
Nathan Jawai	PF	6	0	19	2	0	0	0	2	3.2	.3	.0	.0	.0	.3

- ^{†} Denotes player spent time with another team in the season. Stats reflect time with the Raptors only.
