= Chris Duhon =

American basketball player (born 1982)

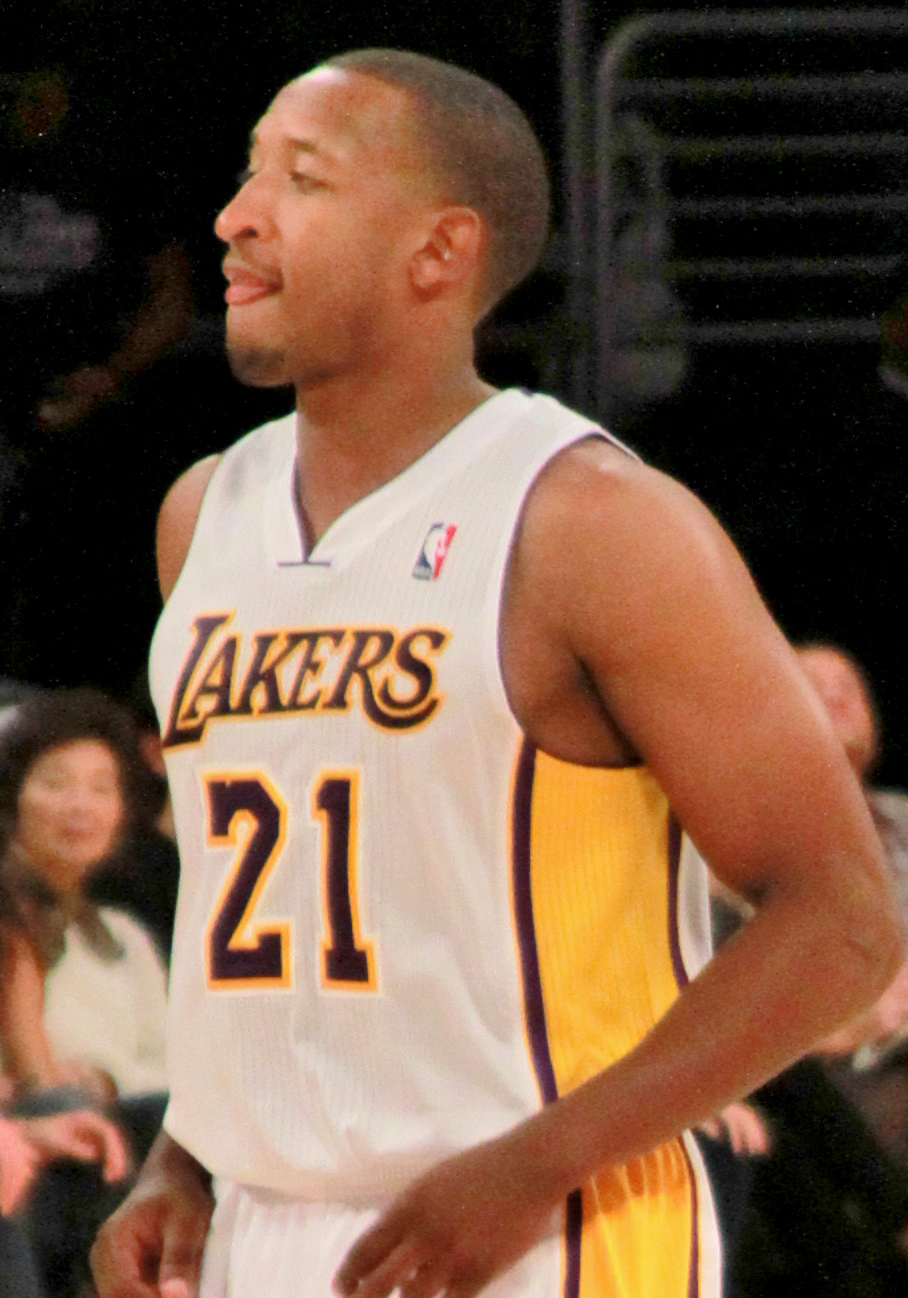
- Duhon with the Los Angeles Lakers in 2012

Personal information
- Born: August 31, 1982 (age 44) Mamou, Louisiana, U.S.
- Listed height: 6 ft 1 in (1.85 m)
- Listed weight: 190 lb (86 kg)

Career information
- High school: Salmen (Slidell, Louisiana)
- College: Duke (2000–2004)
- NBA draft: 2004: 2nd round, 38th overall pick
- Drafted by: Chicago Bulls
- Playing career: 2004–2013
- Position: Point guard
- Number: 21, 1, 25
- Coaching career: 2014–present

Career history

Playing
- 2004–2008: Chicago Bulls
- 2008–2010: New York Knicks
- 2010–2012: Orlando Magic
- 2012–2013: Los Angeles Lakers

Career highlights
- NCAA champion (2001); Second-team All-American – NABC (2004); Third-team All-American – AP (2004); First-team All-ACC (2004); Third-team All-ACC (2003); ACC Rookie of the Year (2001); USA Basketball Male Athlete of the Year (2001); Morgan Wootten National Player of the Year (2000); McDonald's All-American (2000); First-team Parade All-American (2000); Louisiana Mr. Basketball (2000)

Career NBA statistics
- Points: 3,946 (6.5 ppg)
- Rebounds: 1,364 (2.3 rpg)
- Assists: 2,690 (4.4 apg)
- Stats at NBA.com
- Stats at Basketball Reference
Medals
Men's basketball
Representing United States
FIBA U21 World Championship
Gold medal – first place	2001 Saitama	Team competition

Christopher Nicholas Duhon (born August 31, 1982) is an American former professional basketball player. Duhon was a point guard for the Duke Blue Devils men's basketball team from 2000 to 2004. He then played for the Chicago Bulls, New York Knicks, Orlando Magic, and Los Angeles Lakers.

== College career ==
In his senior year at Salmen High School in Slidell, Louisiana, Duhon was voted Mr. Basketball for the state of Louisiana, made the McDonald's All-American Team, and won the McDonald's Three Point Shootout.

Duhon arrived at Duke in 2000, where he was an important role player, playing backup to point guard Jason Williams. Following the injury of teammate Carlos Boozer, Duhon was placed into the starting lineup as point guard, with Williams moving to shooting guard, a combination in which Duhon played well. The Duke Blue Devils went on to win the 2001 national championship, defeating Arizona in the finals.

His sophomore season, Duhon again started in the Duke backcourt alongside fellow guard Jason Williams. That season, Duhon's reputation grew for his defense, court vision, and versatility as a point guard, averaging 2.3 steals per game, and 5.9 assists per game.

From his junior season on, Duhon became an instrumental leader for the Blue Devils. In the 2002–2003 season, he led a young Duke team to the Sweet 16, and averaged 9.2 points, 6.4 assists, and 2.2 steals per game and was among the top 10 assists leaders in NCAA Division I history.

In his senior season, Duhon averaged 10 points, 6 assists, 2.2 steals, and 4.1 rebounds per game, en route to another Final Four.

Duhon finished his career as Duke's all-time leader in steals (300) and minutes played (4,813), and second in assists (819). He had one of Duke's top assists to turnover ratios as well. In Duhon's four years, Duke compiled a 123–21 record, making Duhon the second winningest player in Duke and Atlantic Coast Conference history, behind Duke's Shane Battier (131 wins). He helped the Blue Devils win three ACC Championships. Duhon was a finalist for the 2004 Wooden Award, the Naismith Award, and Rupp Trophy awards. He left as the only Atlantic Coast Conference player to record 1,200 points, 800 assists, 475 rebounds, 300 steals, and 125 three-point shots.

== NBA career ==
=== Chicago Bulls (2004–2008) ===
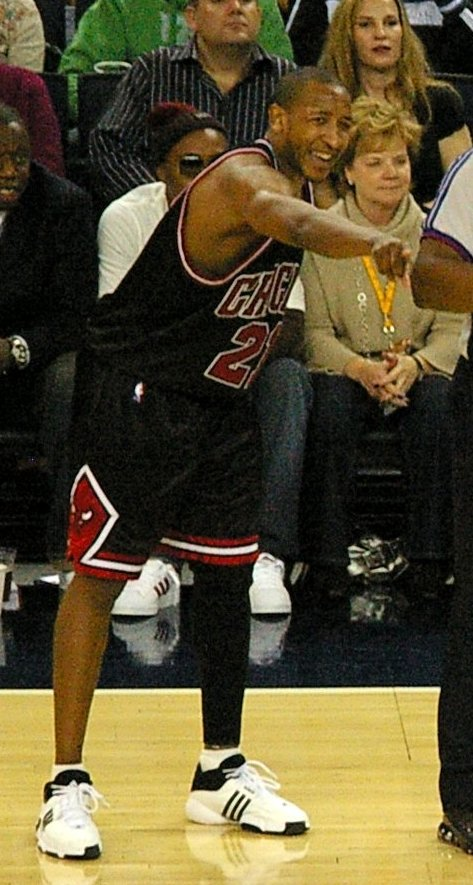
Duhon played with the Bulls from 2004 to 2008

In June 2004, Duhon was selected as the 38th pick in the 2004 NBA draft by the Chicago Bulls. In his rookie season with the Bulls, Duhon played in all 82 games, averaging 5.9 points and 4.9 assists per game. Duhon's best game in his rookie year was against the Atlanta Hawks. Duhon led the Bulls in a comeback against the Hawks, where they trailed at the half. Duhon hit 8 of 9 three-point field-goals in the game, scoring 24 points. This was a franchise record before Ben Gordon, a fellow 2004 draft pick, hit nine threes the following season. The Bulls re-signed Duhon after matching an offer from the Toronto Raptors for the 2005–06 season. In the 2005–2006 season, Duhon averaged 8.7 points per game and 5.0 assists per game.

In 2005, after Hurricane Katrina, Duhon's Stand Tall Foundation handed out over 3,000 boxes of supplies worth $450,000 for residents of his hometown Slidell.

Duhon played a key role in the Bulls winning their first playoff series since the Michael Jordan era against the Miami Heat. The Bulls swept the Heat four games to zero. Duhon provided key minutes as the sixth man in the series against Miami, where he played more minutes because of the foul trouble Kirk Hinrich was plagued with throughout the series.

After the Bulls fell in a 3–0 hole, a deficit no team has come back from in the NBA Playoffs, Duhon played solidly off the bench. He hit a key three-pointer in Game 4 that forced the lead to 23 points. In a relatively easy Game 5 win, Duhon scored 8 points off of 2 threes and a driving lay-up.

The trade of Ben Wallace and Joe Smith to the Cleveland Cavaliers for Larry Hughes and Drew Gooden also caused a logjam in the backcourt. He eventually found his way back into the rotation and once again proved to be a solid floor general. In a game against the Golden State Warriors on February 7, 2008, Duhon scored a career-high 34 points along with 9 assists, 3 steals, 2 rebounds, and 4 three-pointers. Duhon's contract expired June 30, 2008.

=== New York Knicks (2008–2010) ===
On July 4, 2008, Duhon accepted a two-year deal worth close to $12 million total to play for the New York Knicks. Though his other suitor, the Orlando Magic, were considered a team more championship-built, he would have been a backup to Jameer Nelson. With the Knicks, he was considered a possible replacement to Stephon Marbury, whose contract with the Knicks was bought out later that season.

On November 29, 2008, in a game against the Golden State Warriors, Duhon set a new Knicks single-game record with 22 assists in one game.

=== Orlando Magic (2010–2012) ===
On July 8, 2010, Duhon signed a four-year deal worth a guaranteed $12 million with the Orlando Magic.

=== Los Angeles Lakers (2012–2013) ===
On August 10, 2012, Duhon was traded to the Los Angeles Lakers along with teammates Dwight Howard and Earl Clark as part of a four-team deal. On June 29, 2013, Duhon was waived by the Lakers.

== Coaching career ==
In April 2014, Duhon was hired by first-year head coach Dan D'Antoni as an assistant coach at Marshall. D'Antoni previously coached him as an assistant in New York and Los Angeles. After his 2015 aggravated DUI arrest, Marshall University's athletic department issued a statement saying Duhon has been suspended for a violation of department rules and policies. On January 24, 2017, Duhon resigned from Marshall following an arrest for driving on a revoked license three days earlier.

In 2023, Duhon was hired as head coach for the Gaston Christian School boys' basketball team.

== NBA career statistics ==
Legend
GP	Games played	GS	Games started	MPG	Minutes per game
FG%	Field goal percentage	3P%	3-point field goal percentage	FT%	Free throw percentage
RPG	Rebounds per game	APG	Assists per game	SPG	Steals per game
BPG	Blocks per game	PPG	Points per game	**Bold**	Career high

=== Regular season ===
Year	Team	GP	GS	MPG	FG%	3P%	FT%	RPG	APG	SPG	BPG	PPG
2004–05	Chicago	**82**	73	26.5	.352	.355	.731	2.6	4.9	**1.0**	.0	5.9
2005–06	Chicago	74	38	29.1	.400	.360	.818	3.0	5.0	.9	.0	8.7
2006–07	Chicago	78	30	24.4	.408	.359	.752	2.2	4.0	.9	**.1**	7.2
2007–08	Chicago	66	18	22.6	.387	.348	.813	1.8	4.0	.7	.0	5.8
2008–09	New York	79	**78**	**36.8**	**.421**	.391	**.856**	**3.1**	**7.2**	.9	**.1**	**11.1**
2009–10	New York	67	59	30.9	.373	.349	.716	2.7	5.6	.9	.0	7.4
2010–11	Orlando	51	5	15.2	.380	.250	.560	1.0	2.3	.3	.0	2.5
2011–12	Orlando	63	9	19.5	.419	**.420**	.810	1.6	2.4	.6	**.1**	3.8
2012–13	L.A. Lakers	46	9	17.8	.382	.363	.462	1.5	2.9	.4	.0	2.9
Career		606	319	25.6	.393	.363	.784	2.3	4.4	.8	.1	6.5

=== Playoffs ===
Year	Team	GP	GS	MPG	FG%	3P%	FT%	RPG	APG	SPG	BPG	PPG
2005	Chicago	6	**5**	26.5	.297	.273	.818	**4.3**	**3.5**	.3	.0	**6.2**
2006	Chicago	6	0	21.8	.360	.438	.833	2.7	2.2	.3	.0	5.0
2007	Chicago	**9**	0	19.1	.290	.316	.800	1.8	2.3	.3	.1	3.6
2011	Orlando	1	0	4.0	**.500**	**.500**	**1.000**	.0	.0	.0	.0	5.0
2012	Orlando	5	0	12.2	.200	.333	.000	1.4	1.8	**1.0**	.2	.6
2013	L.A. Lakers	2	0	**34.0**	.364	.375	.000	1.5	**3.5**	**1.0**	**.5**	5.5
Career		29	5	20.5	.315	.343	.774	2.4	2.4	.5	.1	4.1

== Personal life ==
Duhon is the cousin of fellow basketball player Jarrett Jack. and NeverLeveled's Founder and Live Entertainment Producer Guy B Duhon Jr; Duhon is married to Andrea Hernandez, with whom he has 4 children.

=== 2013 automobile attack ===
According to police reports, following an argument, Duhon was intentionally hit by an automobile in an Orlando, Florida parking garage. His head hit the car's windshield. Duhon was taken to a hospital and could not recall the incident. The driver escaped, and police are investigating the incident as aggravated battery.

=== Legal troubles ===
On November 30, 2015, shortly after 6 AM police officers were asked to respond to a "man down" call and found Duhon passed out in the driver's seat of his Ford Escape. Duhon was booked into the Western Regional Jail in Barboursville, West Virginia on a charge of aggravated DUI. Marshall University's athletic department issued a statement saying Duhon has been suspended for a violation of department rules and policies.

On January 21, 2017, Duhon was arrested for driving on a revoked license stemming from his November 2015 DUI arrest, and 3 days later resigned from his assistant coaching position at Marshall.

== See also ==
- List of NCAA Division I men's basketball career assists leaders
- List of National Basketball Association players with most assists in a game
