= Cedric Simmons =

American-born Bulgarian basketball player

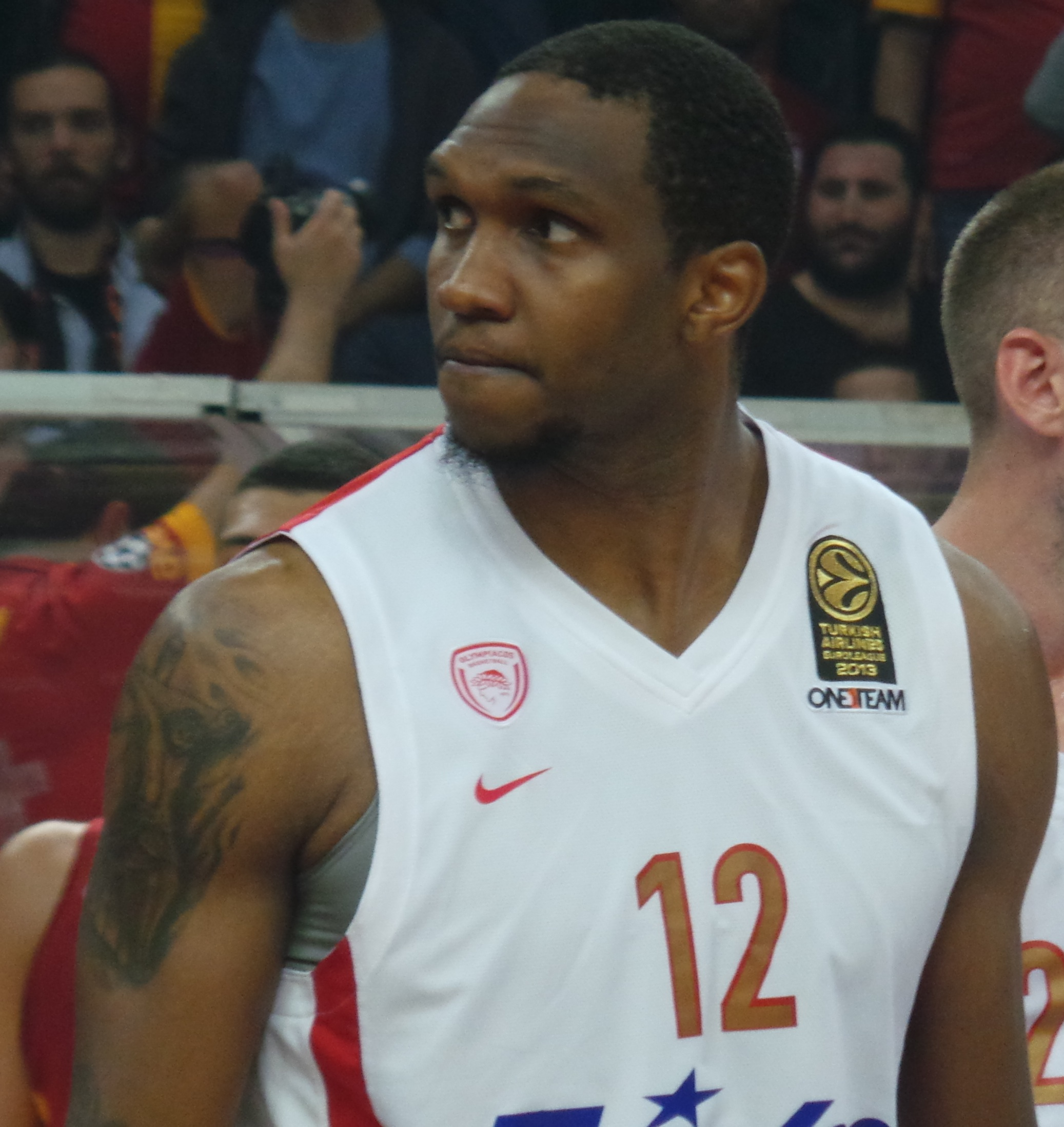
- Simmons with Olympiacos in 2013

Personal information
- Born: January 3, 1986 (age 40) Shallotte, North Carolina, U.S.
- Listed height: 6 ft 9 in (2.06 m)
- Listed weight: 244 lb (111 kg)

Career information
- High school: West Brunswick (Shallotte, North Carolina)
- College: NC State (2004–2006)
- NBA draft: 2006: 1st round, 15th overall pick
- Drafted by: New Orleans Hornets
- Playing career: 2006–2023
- Position: Power forward / center

Career history
- 2006–2007: New Orleans Hornets
- 2007–2008: Cleveland Cavaliers
- 2008: →Rio Grande Valley Vipers
- 2008–2009: Chicago Bulls
- 2008: →Iowa Energy
- 2009: Sacramento Kings
- 2009–2010: Idaho Stampede
- 2010: Dongguan Leopards
- 2010–2011: Kavala
- 2011–2012: Estudiantes
- 2012–2013: Enel Brindisi
- 2013–2014: Olympiacos
- 2014–2015: Enel Brindisi
- 2015–2016: Maccabi Tel Aviv
- 2016–2018: BC Kalev
- 2018–2020: San-en NeoPhoenix
- 2020–2023: SeaHorses Mikawa

Career highlights
- FIBA Intercontinental Cup champion (2013); KML champion (2017); Estonia/Latvia League All Star (2018); Greek League rebounding leader (2011); Greek League blocks leader (2011); Greek All-Star (2011); Fourth-team Parade All-American (2004)
- Stats at NBA.com
- Stats at Basketball Reference

Cedric Simmons (born January 3, 1986) is an American-born Bulgarian former professional basketball player. He was born in the United States, but also holds Bulgarian citizenship, and has played for the senior men's Bulgarian national basketball team. A 6-foot-9-inch-tall (206 cm) power forward-center, Simmons was selected by the New Orleans Hornets, in the first round (15th overall pick over all) of the 2006 NBA draft.

== College career ==
Simmons played college basketball for the NC State Wolfpack. As a sophomore, he averaged 11.8 points, 6.3 rebounds, 1.7 assists, and 2.5 blocks per game.

== Professional career ==
Simmons was selected with the 15th pick in the 2006 NBA draft by the New Orleans Hornets. On July 5, 2006, he signed with the Hornets. On September 29, 2007, he was traded to the Cleveland Cavaliers, in exchange for guard David Wesley. On January 2, 2008, he was assigned to the Rio Grande Valley Vipers of the NBA D-League. He was recalled by Cleveland on January 11, 2008. On February 21, 2008, he was traded to the Chicago Bulls, in a three-team trade, along with Drew Gooden, Larry Hughes, and Shannon Brown, in exchange for Ben Wallace and Joe Smith. On March 15, 2008, he was assigned to the Iowa Energy of the D-League. On April 1, 2008, he was recalled by the Bulls. On February 18, 2009, he was traded to the Sacramento Kings, along with Drew Gooden and Andrés Nocioni, for Brad Miller and John Salmons.

On December 4, 2009, he was signed by the Idaho Stampede of the NBA D-League. In late January 2010, he left the Stampede and signed with the Dongguan Leopards of China for the rest of the 2009–10 CBA season. After the end of the Chinese season, on April 2, 2010, he signed with Kavala of the Greek League for the rest of the season. In August 2011, he signed with Estudiantes of the Spanish Liga ACB for the 2011–12 season.

On August 17, 2012, Simmons signed with New Basket Brindisi of the Italian Serie A for the 2012–13 season. On July 1, 2013, he signed a three-year deal with the Greek club Olympiacos. On November 4, 2014, he parted ways with Olympiacos. Four days later, he signed with his former team New Basket Brindisi. After suffering a season-ending knee injury, he was replaced in the line-up by Micheal Eric on December 13, 2014.

On August 8, 2015, he signed with Royal Halı Gaziantep of the Turkish Basketball League. However, later that month he parted ways with Gaziantep before appearing in a game for them.

On January 28, 2016, he signed a two-week contract with Maccabi Tel Aviv. Following the expiration of his contract, he parted ways with Maccabi on February 12. Two days later, he signed with Baloncesto Sevilla for the rest of the season. However, after failing to pass physicals his contract with the Spanish team was voided.

On August 19, 2016, Simmons joined Budućnost VOLI for a tryout period. However, he did not signed a contract. On November 27, 2016, he signed with Estonian club BC Kalev/Cramo. Two days later, he made his debut for Kalev/Cramo in a 102–69 win over G4S Noorteliiga, recording 6 points in 14 minutes. On August 1, 2017, he re-signed with Kalev/Cramo for one more season.

== National team career ==
Simmons has been a member of the senior men's Bulgarian national basketball team. He played at the FIBA EuroBasket 2013 qualification tournament, where he averaged 10.4 points, 8.3 rebounds, and 1.3 blocks per game.

== Personal life ==
On December 12, 2007, Simmons's girlfriend, Sabrina Acevedo, gave birth to the couple's son at Hillcrest Hospital in Mayfield Heights, Ohio.

== NBA career statistics ==
Legend
GP	Games played	GS	Games started	MPG	Minutes per game
FG%	Field goal percentage	3P%	3-point field goal percentage	FT%	Free throw percentage
RPG	Rebounds per game	APG	Assists per game	SPG	Steals per game
BPG	Blocks per game	PPG	Points per game	**Bold**	Career high

=== Regular season ===
Year	Team	GP	GS	MPG	FG%	3P%	FT%	RPG	APG	SPG	BPG	PPG
2006–07	New Orleans/Oklahoma City	**43**	**4**	**12.4**	.417	.000	.485	**2.5**	**.3**	.2	.5	**2.9**
2007–08	Cleveland	7	0	9.7	.333	.000	.000	2.1	.0	**.3**	**.7**	.6
2007–08	Chicago	7	0	2.7	.250	.000	.000	.4	.0	.0	.0	.6
2008–09	Chicago	11	0	5.5	**.524**	.000	.429	1.1	.2	.1	.4	2.5
2008–09	Sacramento	7	0	3.3	.000	.000	**.500**	.6	.0	.0	.0	.1
Career		75	4	9.4	.409	.000	.390	1.9	.2	.1	.4	2.2
