= 2007–08 Chicago Bulls season =

NBA professional basketball team season

- Head coach: Scott Skiles (fired); Pete Myers (interim); Jim Boylan (interim)
- General manager: John Paxson
- Owner: Jerry Reinsdorf
- Arena: United Center

Results
- Record: 33–49 (.402)
- Place: Division: 4th (Central); Conference: 11th (Eastern)
- Playoff finish: Did not qualify
- Stats at Basketball Reference

Local media
- Television: CSN Chicago; WGN; WCIU
- Radio: WMVP

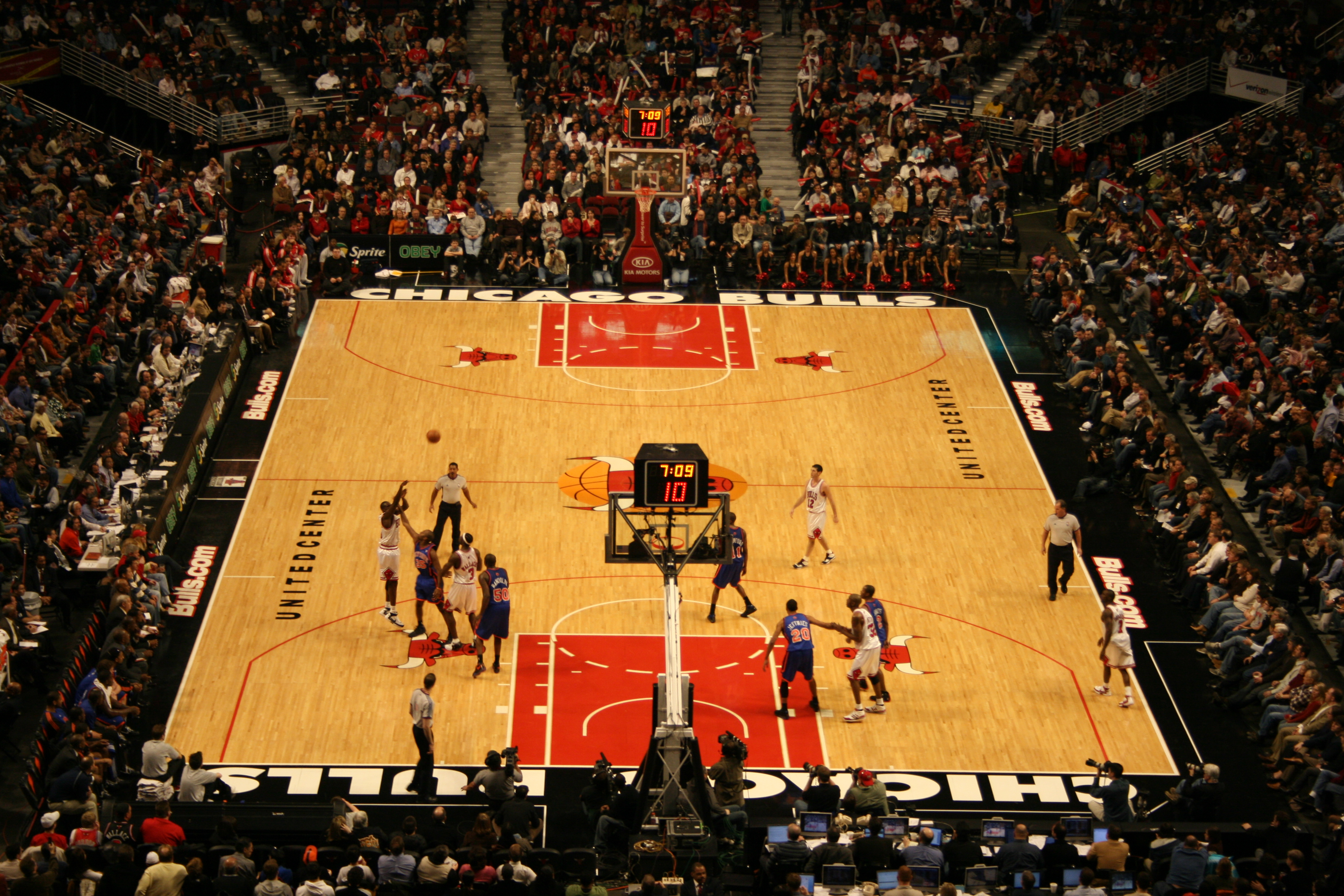
Luol Deng of the Chicago Bulls takes a shot during an NBA game versus the New York Knicks at the United Center in Chicago, December 14, 2007

The 2007–08 Chicago Bulls season was the 42nd season of NBA basketball in Chicago.

Key dates:

- June 28: The 2007 NBA draft took place in New York City.
- July 11: The free agent signing period started.
- October 31: The Bulls' first game of the season against the New Jersey Nets.
- December 24: Scott Skiles was relieved of his duties as the Bulls' head coach.
- December 27: Jim Boylan was named the Bulls' interim head coach for the rest of the season.
- February 21: The Bulls were involved in a three-team trade with the Cleveland Cavaliers and the Seattle SuperSonics that saw Ben Wallace, Joe Smith & Adrian Griffin traded in exchange for four players that included Larry Hughes and Drew Gooden.
- April 16: The Bulls season officially ended with a win against the Raptors. They finished with just 33 wins after being touted as a contender in the Eastern Conference.
- April 17: The Bulls fired interim coach Boylan after a season in which GM John Paxson described as ''disappointing'' and ''disturbing''.

== Offseason ==
The Bulls made the following free agent transactions for the 2007 off-season.

=== Free agents ===
==== Additions ====
| Date signed | Player | Former team |
| July 18 | Andrés Nocioni | Chicago Bulls |
| July 18 | Joe Smith | Philadelphia 76ers |
| October 2 | Andre Barrett | Chicago Bulls |
| October 2 | Joseph Blair | Olimpia Milano |
| October 2 | Justin Cage | Xavier Musketeers |
| October 2 | Thomas Gardner | VOO Verviers-Pepinster |
| October 2 | Jared Homan | Mersin BŞB. S.K. |

==== Subtractions ====
| Date left | Player | New team |
| October 8 | Justin Cage | Colorado 14ers |
| October 10 | Joseph Blair | Spartak Primorje |
| October 10 | Andre Barrett | Bakersfield Jam |

== Roster ==
2007–08 Chicago Bulls roster
Players

| Pos. | No. | Player | Height | Weight | DOB | From |
|---|---|---|---|---|---|---|
| G | 6 | Shannon Brown | 6 ft 4 in (1.93 m) | 205 lb (93 kg) | 1985-11-29 | Michigan State |
| G | 20 | JamesOn Curry (DL) | 6 ft 4 in (1.93 m) | 200 lb (91 kg) | 1986-01-07 | Oklahoma State |
| F | 9 | Luol Deng | 6 ft 8 in (2.03 m) | 220 lb (100 kg) | 1985-04-16 | Duke |
| G | 21 | Chris Duhon | 6 ft 1 in (1.85 m) | 185 lb (84 kg) | 1982-08-31 | Duke |
| F | 90 | Drew Gooden | 6 ft 10 in (2.08 m) | 230 lb (104 kg) | 1981-09-24 | Kansas |
| G | 7 | Ben Gordon | 6 ft 3 in (1.91 m) | 200 lb (91 kg) | 1983-04-04 | Connecticut |
| C | 34 | Aaron Gray | 7 ft 0 in (2.13 m) | 270 lb (122 kg) | 1984-12-07 | Pittsburgh |
| G | 12 | Kirk Hinrich | 6 ft 3 in (1.91 m) | 190 lb (86 kg) | 1981-01-02 | Kansas |
| G | 32 | Larry Hughes | 6 ft 5 in (1.96 m) | 185 lb (84 kg) | 1979-01-23 | Saint Louis |
| F | 35 | Demetris Nichols | 6 ft 8 in (2.03 m) | 215 lb (98 kg) | 1984-09-04 | Syracuse |
| C | 13 | Joakim Noah | 6 ft 11 in (2.11 m) | 230 lb (104 kg) | 1985-02-25 | Florida |
| F | 5 | Andres Nocioni | 6 ft 7 in (2.01 m) | 225 lb (102 kg) | 1979-11-30 | Argentina |
| G | 2 | Thabo Sefolosha | 6 ft 5 in (1.96 m) | 215 lb (98 kg) | 1984-05-02 | Switzerland |
| F | 15 | Cedric Simmons (DL) | 6 ft 9 in (2.06 m) | 235 lb (107 kg) | 1986-01-03 | NC State |
| F | 24 | Tyrus Thomas | 6 ft 9 in (2.06 m) | 215 lb (98 kg) | 1986-08-17 | Louisiana State |

Coaches
Head coach
- Scott Skiles (fired)
- Pete Myers (interim)
- Jim Boylan (interim)
Assistant(s)
- Ron Adams
- Mike Brown
- Mike Wilhelm
- Fred Tedeschi (trainer)

Legend
- (DP) Unsigned draft pick
- (FA) Free agent
- (S) Suspended
- (DL) On assignment to D-League affiliate
- Injured

Roster
Updated: April 2, 2008

== Regular season ==
=== Season standings ===
| Central Division | W | L | PCT | GB | Home | Road | Div |
|---|---|---|---|---|---|---|---|
| y-Detroit Pistons | 59 | 23 | .732 | – | 34–7 | 25–16 | 11–5 |
| x-Cleveland Cavaliers | 45 | 37 | .549 | 14 | 27–14 | 18–23 | 7–9 |
| Indiana Pacers | 36 | 46 | .439 | 23 | 21–20 | 15–26 | 5–11 |
| Chicago Bulls | 33 | 49 | .402 | 26 | 20–21 | 13–28 | 11–5 |
| Milwaukee Bucks | 26 | 56 | .317 | 33 | 19–22 | 7–34 | 6–10 |

Eastern Conference
| # | Team | W | L | PCT | GB |
|---|---|---|---|---|---|
| 1 | z-Boston Celtics | 66 | 16 | .805 | – |
| 2 | y-Detroit Pistons | 59 | 23 | .732 | 7 |
| 3 | y-Orlando Magic | 52 | 30 | .634 | 14 |
| 4 | x-Cleveland Cavaliers | 45 | 37 | .549 | 21 |
| 5 | x-Washington Wizards | 43 | 39 | .524 | 23 |
| 6 | x-Toronto Raptors | 41 | 41 | .500 | 25 |
| 7 | x-Philadelphia 76ers | 40 | 42 | .488 | 26 |
| 8 | x-Atlanta Hawks | 37 | 45 | .451 | 29 |
| 9 | Indiana Pacers | 36 | 46 | .439 | 30 |
| 10 | New Jersey Nets | 34 | 48 | .415 | 32 |
| 11 | Chicago Bulls | 33 | 49 | .402 | 33 |
| 12 | Charlotte Bobcats | 32 | 50 | .390 | 34 |
| 13 | Milwaukee Bucks | 26 | 56 | .317 | 40 |
| 14 | New York Knicks | 23 | 59 | .280 | 43 |
| 15 | Miami Heat | 15 | 67 | .183 | 51 |

== Game log ==
2007–08 game log
Total: 33–49 (Home: 20–21; Road: 13–28)
October: 0–1 (home: 0–0; road: 0–1)

| Game | Date | Team | Score | High points | High rebounds | High assists | Location Attendance | Record |
|---|---|---|---|---|---|---|---|---|
| 1 | October 31 | @ New Jersey | 103–112 | Gordon (27) | Deng (11) | Duhon (6) | Izod Center; 17,342 | 0–1 |

November: 3–9 (home: 2–3; road: 1–6)

| Game | Date | Team | Score | High points | High rebounds | High assists | Location Attendance | Record |
|---|---|---|---|---|---|---|---|---|
| 2 | November 2 | Philadelphia | 85–96 | Gordon (25) | Thomas (12) | Hinrich (8) | United Center; 22,034 | 0–2 |
| 3 | November 3 | @ Milwaukee | 72–78 | Gordon (15) | Smith (10) | Hinrich (4) | Bradley Center; 18,717 | 0–3 |
| 4 | November 6 | LA Clippers | 91–97 | Deng (22) | Deng (8) | Thomas (5) | United Center; 21,742 | 0–4 |
| 5 | November 8 | Detroit | 97–93 | Thomas (19) | Thomas (14) | Hinrich (14) | United Center; 21,797 | 1–4 |
| 6 | November 10 | Toronto | 71–101 | Nocioni (20) | Sefolosha (6) | Hinrich, Duhon, Sefolosha (4) | United Center; 22,467 | 1–5 |
| 7 | November 15 | @ Phoenix | 102–112 | Gordon (24) | Wallace (10) | Hinrich (7) | US Airways Center; 18,422 | 1–6 |
| 8 | November 17 | @ LA Clippers | 92–73 | Gordon (25) | Wallace (13) | Hinrich, Gordon, Duhon (4) | Staples Center; 17,535 | 2–6 |
| 9 | November 18 | @ LA Lakers | 78–106 | Gordon (20) | Wallace (8) | Hinrich (8) | Staples Center; 18,997 | 2–7 |
| 10 | November 20 | @ Denver | 91–112 | Noah (16) | Wallace (12) | Duhon (5) | Pepsi Center; 17,106 | 2–8 |
| 11 | November 24 | @ New York | 78–85 | Nocioni (23) | Wallace (12) | Hinrich (4) | Madison Square Garden; 19,763 | 2–9 |
| 12 | November 25 | @ Toronto | 78–93 | Deng (21) | Deng (9) | Hinrich (7) | Air Canada Centre; 19,800 | 2–10 |
| 13 | November 27 | Atlanta | 90–78 | Deng (22) | Wallace, Thomas (12) | Duhon (7) | United Center; 21,826 | 3–10 |

December: 8–8 (home: 4–5; road: 4–3)

| Game | Date | Team | Score | High points | High rebounds | High assists | Location Attendance | Record |
|---|---|---|---|---|---|---|---|---|
| 14 | December 1 | Charlotte | 111–95 | Gordon (34) | Wallace (19) | Hinrich (7) | United Center; 21,729 | 4–10 |
| 15 | December 3 | Dallas | 98–103 | Nocioni (30) | Duhon (9) | Hinrich, Duhon (5) | United Center; 21,780 | 4–11 |
| 16 | December 5 | @ Charlotte | 91–82 | Deng (30) | Nocioni (11) | Duhon (9) | Charlotte Bobcats Arena; 13,227 | 5–11 |
| 17 | December 7 | @ Detroit | 98–91 | Nocioni (22) | Smith (14) | Hinrich (6) | Palace of Auburn Hills; 22,076 | 6–11 |
| 18 | December 8 | Boston | 81–92 | Nocioni (18) | Wallace (14) | Hinrich (6) | United Center; 22,778 | 6–12 |
| 19 | December 11 | Seattle | 123–96 | Gordon (27) | Thomas (9) | Hinrich (8) | United Center; 21,772 | 7–12 |
| 20 | December 12 | @ Indiana | 102–117 | Gordon (27) | Deng (7) | Hinrich (8) | Conseco Fieldhouse; 10,381 | 7–13 |
| 21 | December 14 | New York | 101–96 | Deng (29) | Hinrich (12) | Hinrich (14) | United Center; 21,751 | 8–13 |
| 22 | December 18 | LA Lakers | 91–103 | Deng (26) | Deng, Nocioni (7) | Hinrich (8) | United Center; 22,310 | 8–14 |
| 23 | December 19 | @ Washington | 95–84 | Gordon (22) | Gray (10) | Gordon (6) | Verizon Center; 14,792 | 9–14 |
| 24 | December 21 | @ Boston | 82–107 | Gordon (19) | Thomas (9) | Duhon (4) | TD Banknorth Garden; 18,624 | 9–15 |
| 25 | December 22 | Houston | 98–116 | Hinrich (22) | Deng (7) | Deng (5) | United Center; 22,434 | 9–16 |
| 26 | December 26 | @ San Antonio | 79–94 | Smith (19) | Smith (11) | Hinrich (7) | AT&T Center; 18,797 | 9–17 |
| 27 | December 28 | Milwaukee | 103–99 | Gordon (31) | Deng, Wallace (10) | Hinrich (9) | United Center; 22,189 | 10–17 |
| 28 | December 30 | @ New York | 100–83 | Gordon (25) | Wallace (10) | Hinrich (8) | Madison Square Garden; 19,763 | 11–17 |
| 29 | December 31 | Orlando | 110–112 | Gordon (39) | Wallace (12) | Hinrich (10) | United Center; 22,126 | 11–18 |

January: 7–9 (home: 4–5; road: 3–4)

| Game | Date | Team | Score | High points | High rebounds | High assists | Location Attendance | Record |
|---|---|---|---|---|---|---|---|---|
| 30 | January 2 | @ Charlotte | 109–97 | Gordon (22) | Deng (13) | Deng (5) | Charlotte Bobcats Arena; 11,568 | 12–18 |
| 31 | January 3 | Portland | 109–115 | Gordon (32) | Wallace (14) | Hinrich (9) | United Center; 21,756 | 12–19 |
| 32 | January 5 | Sacramento | 94–93 | Nocioni (26) | Wallace (11) | Hinrich (7) | United Center; 21,908 | 13–19 |
| 33 | January 8 | New York | 100–105 | Smith (22) | Smith (12) | Hinrich (9) | United Center; 21,838 | 13–20 |
| 34 | January 11 | @ Philadelphia | 100–97 | Nocioni (27) | Wallace (8) | Hinrich (7) | Wachovia Center; 17,046 | 14–20 |
| 35 | January 13 | @ Atlanta | 84–105 | Deng (28) | Wallace (13) | Duhon, Sefolosha (5) | Philips Arena; 16,065 | 14–21 |
| 36 | January 15 | @ Orlando | 88–102 | Smith (13) | Noah (11) | Duhon (5) | Amway Arena; 17,519 | 14–22 |
| 37 | January 16 | @ Miami | 126–96 | Gordon (24) | Noah (8) | Deng (8) | American Airlines Arena; 19,600 | 15–22 |
| 38 | January 18 | Golden State | 111–119 | Gordon (29) | Deng (12) | Duhon (8) | United Center; 21,896 | 15–23 |
| 39 | January 19 | Detroit | 97–81 | Gordon (33) | Sefolosha (13) | Duhon (4) | United Center; 22,657 | 16–23 |
| 40 | January 21 | @ Memphis | 90–104 | Gordon (25) | Wallace (13) | Hinrich (6) | FedExForum; 18,119 | 16–24 |
| 41 | January 23 | Indiana | 108–95 | Hinrich (38) | Noah (15) | Hinrich (10) | United Center; 21,774 | 17–24 |
| 42 | January 25 | Charlotte | 77–90 | Nocioni (25) | Sefolosha (10) | Hinrich (8) | United Center; 21,761 | 17–25 |
| 43 | January 27 | Phoenix | 77–88 | Hinrich (31) | Thomas (11) | Hinrich, Duhon (3) | United Center; 22,245 | 17–26 |
| 44 | January 29 | Minnesota | 96–85 | Hinrich (27) | Noah (13) | Hinrich (6) | United Center; 21,725 | 18–26 |
| 45 | January 30 | @ Minnesota | 67–83 | Hinrich, Sefolosha (14) | Noah, Wallace, Sefolosha (8) | Hinrich (8) | Target Center; 10,910 | 18–27 |

February: 5–8 (home: 2–2; road: 3–6)

| Game | Date | Team | Score | High points | High rebounds | High assists | Location Attendance | Record |
|---|---|---|---|---|---|---|---|---|
| 46 | February 2 | @ Sacramento | 101–105 | Gordon (33) | Wallace (9) | Hinrich, Duhon (3) | ARCO Arena; 15,526 | 18–28 |
| 47 | February 4 | @ Seattle | 118–108 | Smith (25) | Wallace, Smith (10) | Wallace (7) | KeyArena; 10,935 | 19–28 |
| 48 | February 6 | @ Portland | 97–100 | Sefolosha, Nocioni (22) | Wallace (8) | Duhon (9) | Rose Garden; 20,126 | 19–29 |
| 49 | February 7 | @ Golden State | 114–108 | Duhon (34) | Noah (10) | Duhon (9) | Oracle Arena; 19,596 | 20–29 |
| 50 | February 9 | @ Utah | 87–97 | Sefolosha (22) | Sefolosha, Wallace (7) | Duhon (8) | EnergySolutions Arena; 19,911 | 20–30 |
| 51 | February 12 | New Orleans | 86–100 | Nocioni (28) | Wallace (16) | Duhon (5) | United Center; 21,739 | 20–31 |
| 52 | February 14 | Miami | 99–92 | Hinrich (24) | Sefolosha, Thomas (12) | Duhon (8) | United Center; 21,792 | 21–31 |
| 53 | February 20 | @ New Jersey | 102–110 | Smith (17) | Nocioni, Smith, Wallace (9) | Hinrich (6) | Izod Center; 15,150 | 21–32 |
| 54 | February 22 | Denver | 135–121 | Gordon (37) | Thomas (11) | Hinrich (14) | United Center; 21,848 | 22–32 |
| 55 | February 24 | @ Houston | 97–110 | Thomas (18) | Gooden (8) | Hinrich (10) | Toyota Center; 18,275 | 22–33 |
| 56 | February 25 | @ Dallas | 94–102 | Gordon (25) | Deng (9) | Gordon (4) | American Airlines Center; 20,340 | 22–34 |
| 57 | February 27 | @ Indiana | 113–107 | Hughes (29) | Gooden (15) | Gordon, Hughes (6) | Conseco Fieldhouse; 10,556 | 23–34 |
| 58 | February 29 | Washington | 91–97 | Nocioni (19) | Deng (11) | Hughes (6) | United Center; 21,884 | 23–35 |

March: 6–9 (home: 6–3; road: 0–6)

| Game | Date | Team | Score | High points | High rebounds | High assists | Location Attendance | Record |
|---|---|---|---|---|---|---|---|---|
| 59 | March 2 | @ Cleveland | 86–95 | Hughes (23) | Gooden (10) | Hughes (4) | Quicken Loans Arena; 20,562 | 23–36 |
| 60 | March 4 | Memphis | 112–97 | Deng, Gooden (21) | Gooden (14) | Hinrich (12) | United Center; 21,725 | 24–36 |
| 61 | March 6 | Cleveland | 107–96 | Deng, Gordon (23) | Noah (20) | Hinrich (7) | United Center; 22,097 | 25–36 |
| 62 | March 7 | @ Boston | 93–116 | Gordon (20) | Gray (8) | Gordon (4) | TD Banknorth Garden; 18,624 | 25–37 |
| 63 | March 9 | @ Detroit | 109–116 | Gordon (27) | Gooden (8) | Hughes (5) | Palace of Auburn Hills; 22,076 | 25–38 |
| 64 | March 11 | Utah | 108–96 | Gooden (24) | Gooden (10) | Hinrich (6) | United Center; 21,969 | 26–38 |
| 65 | March 14 | Philadelphia | 106–110 | Deng (21) | Gooden (9) | Hinrich (6) | United Center; 22,069 | 26–39 |
| 66 | March 17 | @ New Orleans | 97–108 | Gordon (31) | Gooden (12) | Hinrich (5) | New Orleans Arena; 14,337 | 26–40 |
| 67 | March 18 | New Jersey | 112–96 | Deng (20) | Gooden (11) | Hinrich (8) | United Center; 22,070 | 27–40 |
| 68 | March 20 | San Antonio | 80–102 | Deng (18) | Gordon (8) | Gordon (3) | United Center; 22,353 | 27–41 |
| 69 | March 22 | Indiana | 101–108 | Deng (28) | Gooden, Hughes (10) | Hinrich (10) | United Center; 21,752 | 27–42 |
| 70 | March 25 | Atlanta | 103–94 | Gooden (31) | Gooden (16) | Hinrich (10) | United Center; 21,806 | 28–42 |
| 71 | March 26 | @ Philadelphia | 99–121 | Sefolosha (20) | Gooden (8) | Hinrich (6) | Wachovia Center; 18,620 | 28–43 |
| 72 | March 28 | @ Atlanta | 103–106 | Deng (19) | Noah (7) | Hinrich (8) | Philips Arena; 17,223 | 28–44 |
| 73 | March 29 | Milwaukee | 114–111 | Hughes (19) | Noah (15) | Hinrich (6) | United Center; 21,983 | 29–44 |

April: 4–5 (home: 2–3; road: 2–2)

| Game | Date | Team | Score | High points | High rebounds | High assists | Location Attendance | Record |
|---|---|---|---|---|---|---|---|---|
| 74 | April 1 | Boston | 92–106 | Thomas (24) | Noah (8) | Hinrich, Deng (5) | United Center; 22,225 | 29–45 |
| 75 | April 3 | @ Cleveland | 101–98 | Hughes (25) | Hughes (8) | Hughes (9) | Quicken Loans Arena; 20,562 | 30–45 |
| 76 | April 5 | Washington | 87–99 | Gordon (18) | Sefolosha (7) | Gordon (4) | United Center; 21,929 | 30–46 |
| 77 | April 8 | @ Miami | 88–95 | Deng (25) | Duhon, Hinrich (4) | Noah (13) | American Airlines Arena; 19,175 | 30–47 |
| 78 | April 9 | @ Orlando | 83–115 | Hinrich (19) | Deng (7) | Hinrich, Sefolosha (4) | Amway Arena; 17,519 | 30–48 |
| 79 | April 11 | Cleveland | 100–95 | Deng (21) | Thomas (14) | Hinrich (6) | United Center; 22,084 | 31–48 |
| 80 | April 13 | Orlando | 84–104 | Nocioni (22) | Deng (7) | Hinrich (7) | United Center; 21,973 | 31–49 |
| 81 | April 14 | @ Milwaukee | 151–135 | Deng (32) | Thomas, Sefolosha (8) | Duhon (15) | Bradley Center; 16,212 | 32–49 |
| 82 | April 16 | Toronto | 107–97 | Thomas (26) | Gray (22) | Hinrich, Duhon (6) | United Center; 21,909 | 33–49 |

2007–08 season schedule

== Player stats ==
Legend
| GP | Games played | GS | Games started | MPG | Minutes per game |
| FG% | Field-goal percentage | 3P% | 3-point field-goal percentage | FT% | Free-throw percentage |
| RPG | Rebounds per game | APG | Assists per game | SPG | Steals per game |
| BPG | Blocks per game | PPG | Points per game |

=== Regular season ===
| Player | GP | GS | MPG | FG% | 3P% | FT% | RPG | APG | SPG | BPG | PPG |
|---|---|---|---|---|---|---|---|---|---|---|---|
| Shannon Brown* | 21 | 4 | 11.4 | .349 | .300 | .586 | 1.0 | .8 | .52 | .14 | 5.4 |
| Luol Deng | 63 | 59 | 33.8 | .479 | .364 | .770 | 6.3 | 2.5 | .90 | .46 | 17.0 |
| Chris Duhon | 66 | 18 | 22.6 | .387 | .348 | .813 | 1.8 | 4.0 | .73 | .03 | 5.8 |
| Thomas Gardner | 4 | 0 | 11.3 | .391 | .250 | .000 | 1.0 | .3 | .00 | .00 | 5.3 |
| Drew Gooden* | 69 | 65 | 30.8 | .449 | .000 | .753 | 8.6 | 1.2 | .70 | .77 | 12.0 |
| Ben Gordon | 72 | 27 | 31.8 | .434 | .410 | .908 | 3.1 | 3.0 | .76 | .11 | 18.6 |
| Aaron Gray | 61 | 1 | 10.0 | .505 | .000 | .566 | 2.8 | .7 | .34 | .26 | 4.3 |
| Kirk Hinrich | 75 | 72 | 31.7 | .414 | .350 | .831 | 3.3 | 6.0 | 1.16 | .25 | 11.5 |
| Larry Hughes* | 68 | 57 | 29.7 | .381 | .345 | .798 | 3.4 | 2.7 | 1.46 | .25 | 12.2 |
| Viktor Khryapa | 9 | 0 | 11.7 | .387 | .000 | .571 | 2.2 | .9 | .67 | .00 | 3.6 |
| Demetris Nichols* | 14 | 0 | 3.1 | .261 | .231 | .000 | .4 | .1 | .00 | .21 | 1.1 |
| Joakim Noah | 74 | 31 | 20.7 | .482 | .000 | .691 | 5.6 | 1.1 | .92 | .86 | 6.6 |
| Andrés Nocioni | 82 | 27 | 24.6 | .432 | .364 | .807 | 4.2 | 1.2 | .30 | .52 | 13.2 |
| Thabo Sefolosha | 69 | 22 | 20.8 | .428 | .330 | .721 | 3.7 | 1.9 | .88 | .43 | 6.7 |
| Cedric Simmons* | 14 | 0 | 6.2 | .286 | .000 | .000 | 1.3 | .0 | .14 | .36 | .6 |
| Tyrus Thomas | 74 | 27 | 18.0 | .423 | .167 | .741 | 4.6 | 1.2 | .65 | .97 | 6.8 |

*Total for entire season including previous team(s)

== Transactions ==
The Bulls were involved in the following transactions during the 2007–08 season.

=== Trades ===
| February 21, 2008 | To **Chicago Bulls** Drew Gooden, Larry Hughes, Shannon Brown & Cedric Simmons | To **Cleveland Cavaliers** **Ben Wallace**, Wally Szczerbiak, **Joe Smith**, Delonte West, a 2009 second round pick and a $1.7 mil trade exception | To **Seattle SuperSonics** Ira Newble, Donyell Marshall and **Adrian Griffin**. |

- Players in **bold** denote former Bulls players.

=== Free agents ===
| **Player** / **Former team** | **Player** / **New team** |
