= Drew Gooden (basketball) =

American basketball player (born 1981)

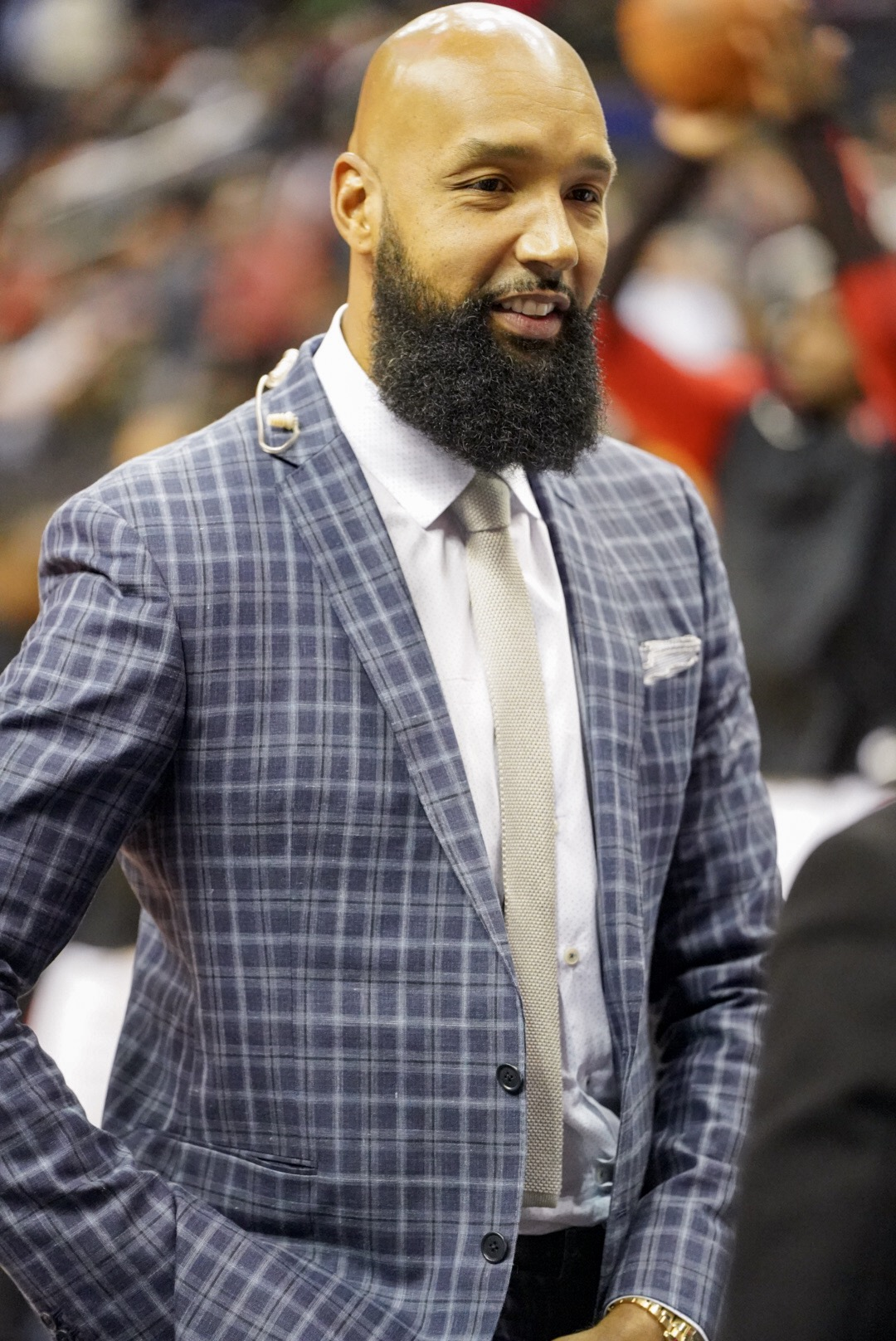
- Gooden in 2018

Personal information
- Born: September 24, 1981 (age 45) Oakland, California, U.S.
- Listed height: 6 ft 10 in (2.08 m)
- Listed weight: 250 lb (113 kg)

Career information
- High school: El Cerrito (El Cerrito, California)
- College: Kansas (1999–2002)
- NBA draft: 2002: 1st round, 4th overall pick
- Drafted by: Memphis Grizzlies
- Playing career: 2002–2016
- Position: Power forward
- Number: 0, 9, 90

Career history
- 2002–2003: Memphis Grizzlies
- 2003–2004: Orlando Magic
- 2004–2008: Cleveland Cavaliers
- 2008–2009: Chicago Bulls
- 2009: Sacramento Kings
- 2009: San Antonio Spurs
- 2009–2010: Dallas Mavericks
- 2010: Los Angeles Clippers
- 2010–2013: Milwaukee Bucks
- 2014–2016: Washington Wizards

Career highlights
- NBA All-Rookie First Team (2003); NABC co-Player of the Year (2002); Consensus first-team All-American (2002); Pete Newell Big Man Award (2002); Big 12 Player of the Year (2002); First-team All-Big 12 (2002); Second-team All-Big 12 (2001); No. 0 retired by Kansas Jayhawks; Third-team Parade All-American (1999)

Career NBA statistics
- Points: 8,653 (11.0 ppg)
- Rebounds: 5,618 (7.1 rpg)
- Assists: 896 (1.1 apg)
- Stats at NBA.com
- Stats at Basketball Reference

Andrew Melvin Gooden III (born September 24, 1981) is an American former professional basketball player who is currently a broadcaster for Monumental Sports Network. The power forward played 14 seasons in the National Basketball Association (NBA). Gooden played college basketball for the Kansas Jayhawks, where he was a consensus first-team All-American in 2002. He earned NBA All-Rookie First Team honors with the Memphis Grizzlies after they selected him in the first round of the 2002 NBA draft with the fourth overall pick.

== High school ==
As a senior at El Cerrito High School, Gooden led his Gauchos to the 1999 California Interscholastic Federation Boys' Division III championship game. Washington Union High School (led by future NBA guard DeShawn Stevenson) won the championship game over El Cerrito HS by a score of 77–71.

== College career ==
Gooden joined fellow freshmen Nick Collison and Kirk Hinrich for the 1999–2000 season at Kansas. Although at times, Gooden was frustrated with the way things were going his freshman year, he finally adjusted to coach Roy Williams' system.

In his freshman year, the Jayhawks went 24–10 and lost to Duke in the round of 32 during the 2000 NCAA basketball tournament. The next season, the Jayhawks went 26–7 and fell to Illinois in the 2001 NCAA basketball tournament Sweet Sixteen.

In 2002, he led the nation in rebounding and was named NABC National Player of the Year. The Jayhawks went 33–4, including 16–0 in Big 12 Conference play to win Kansas its first conference championship since 1998. The Jayhawks advanced to their first Final Four in the 2002 NCAA basketball tournament since 1993, however, they lost to the eventual national champion Maryland in the semifinal.

For being named NABC Player of the Year for 2002, Gooden's jersey (#0) was retired in 2003. The ceremony occurred at halftime of a Kansas home game with Kansas State in what would have been Gooden's senior year had he not foregone his senior year for the NBA.

== Professional career ==
=== Memphis Grizzlies (2002–2003) ===
Gooden declared himself for the draft after his junior year. Out of Kansas, Gooden was selected as the 4th overall pick by the Memphis Grizzlies in the 2002 NBA draft.

=== Orlando Magic (2003–2004) ===
In March 2003, Gooden and Gordan Giriček were traded to the Orlando Magic for Mike Miller, Ryan Humphrey, and two draft picks.

=== Cleveland Cavaliers (2004–2008) ===
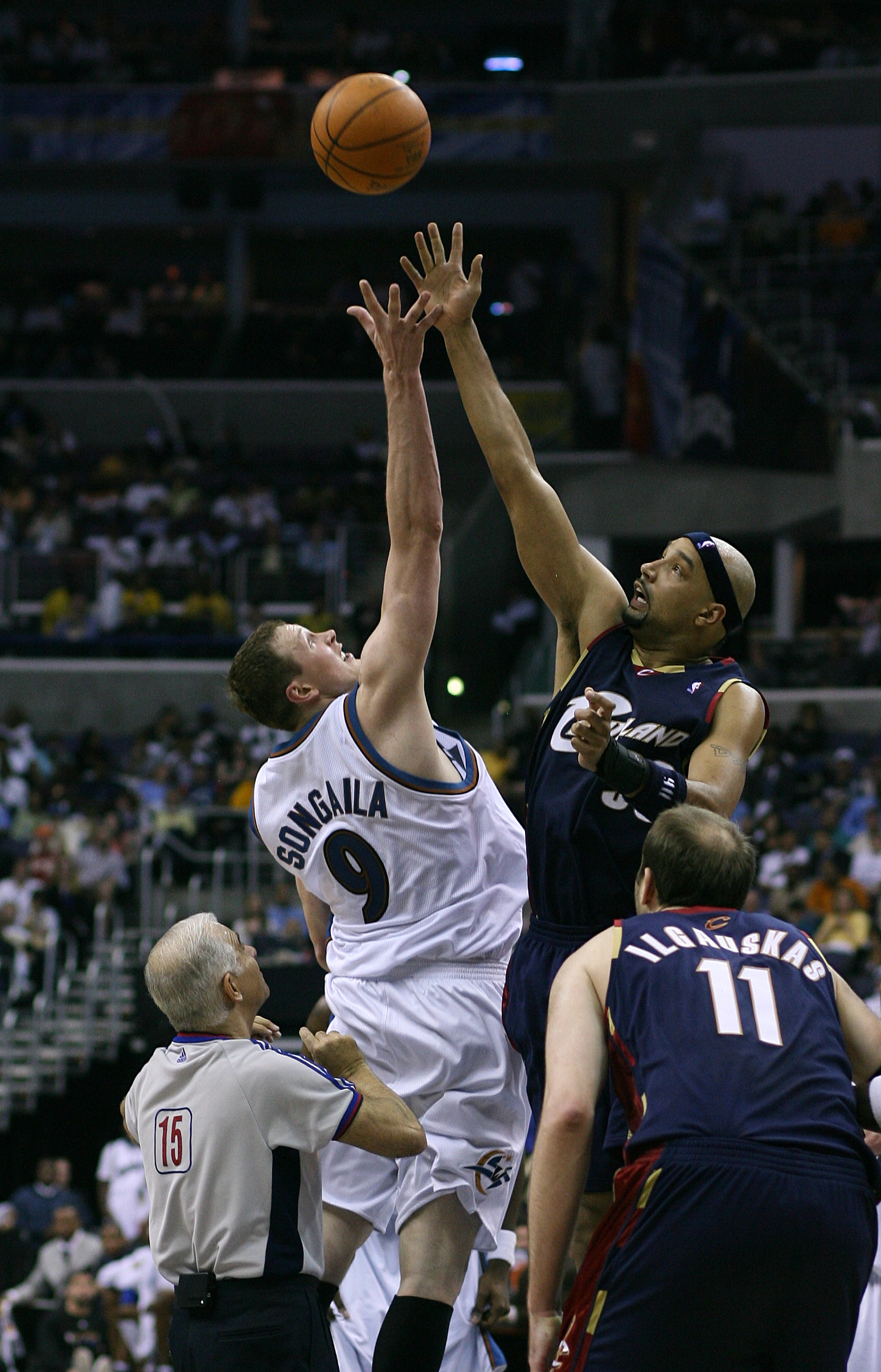
Gooden and Washington Wizards player Darius Songaila try to get a jump ball during a 2007 game

On July 23, 2004, the Cleveland Cavaliers acquired Gooden, Anderson Varejão, and Steven Hunter for Tony Battie and two second-round draft picks from the Orlando Magic via trade. On January 20, 2005, Gooden led the Cavaliers to a win over the Bucks with a career-high 33 points, including 27 in the second half.

Gooden re-signed with the Cavaliers for three more years on August 14, 2006. He agreed to a three-year, $23 million contract.

In the 2006–07 NBA season, he averaged 11.1 points per game and 8.5 rebounds per game.

=== Chicago Bulls (2008–2009) ===
On February 21, 2008, at the 2007–08 season's trade deadline, Gooden was traded by the Cavs (along with Larry Hughes, Cedric Simmons, and Shannon Brown) to the Chicago Bulls as a part of a three-team, 11-player deal involving the Seattle SuperSonics.

=== Sacramento Kings (2009) ===
On February 18, 2009, at the 2008–09 season's trade deadline, Gooden, Simmons, Andrés Nocioni and Michael Ruffin was traded to the Sacramento Kings for Brad Miller and John Salmons.

On March 1, Gooden was bought out of his contract making him a free agent after playing just one game for the Kings.

=== San Antonio Spurs (2009) ===
On March 5, 2009, Gooden signed with the San Antonio Spurs for the remainder of the season.

=== Dallas Mavericks (2009–2010) ===
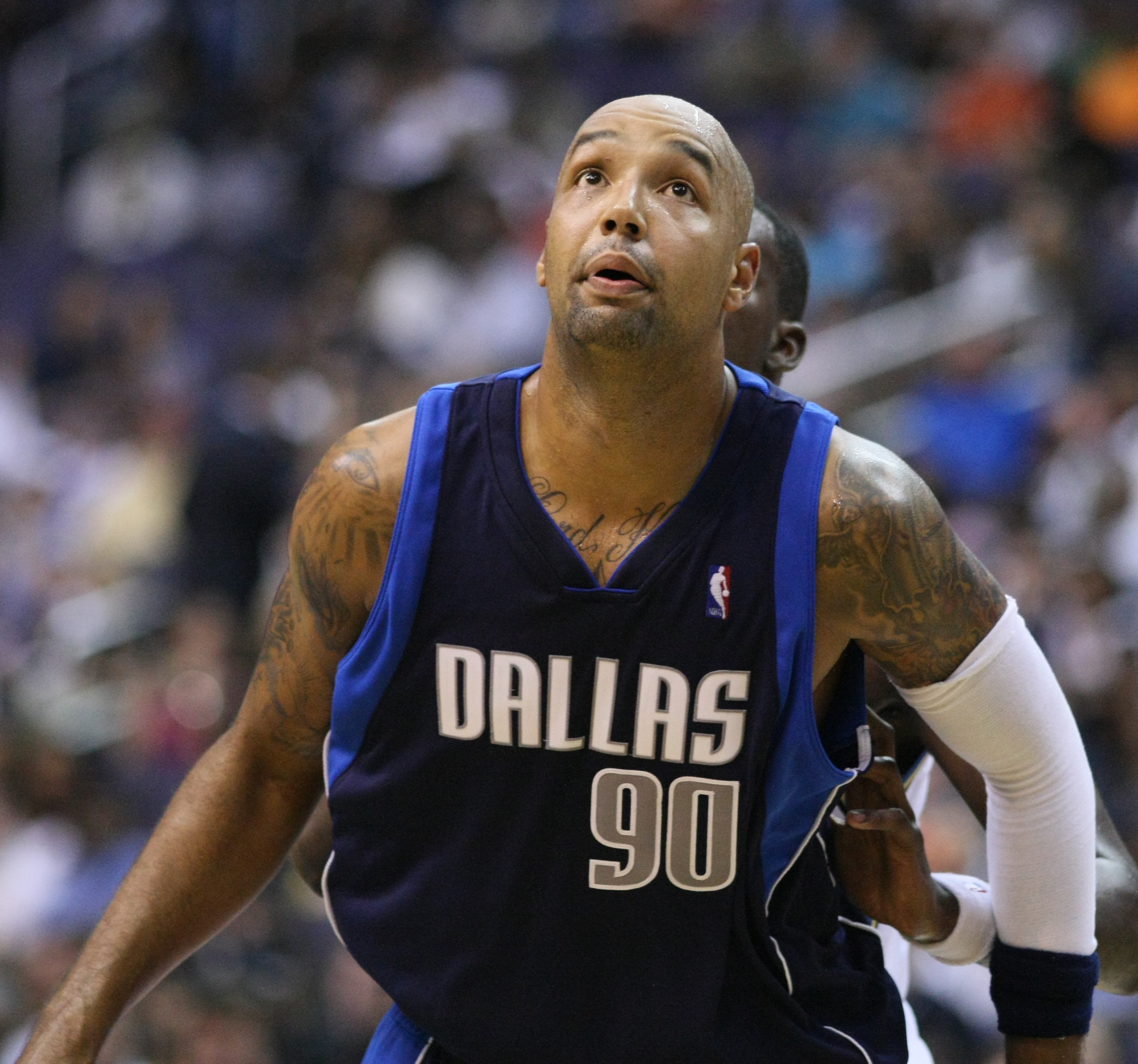
Gooden with the Mavericks in 2009

On July 25, 2009, Gooden posted a message on his Twitter page that said "Dallas Here I Come!!!" Dallas Mavericks owner, Mark Cuban, retweeted Gooden's tweet, adding "Welcome Drew.. !". On July 30, Gooden officially signed with the Mavericks.

=== Los Angeles Clippers (2010) ===
On February 13, 2010, Gooden was traded to the Washington Wizards along with Josh Howard, James Singleton, and Quinton Ross for Caron Butler, Brendan Haywood, and DeShawn Stevenson. Four days later, he was traded again, this time to the Los Angeles Clippers as part of a three-team, six-player trade that sent Antawn Jamison from Washington to the Cleveland Cavaliers, Žydrūnas Ilgauskas, a 2010 first-round pick and the rights to Emir Preldžič from the Cavaliers to Washington, Al Thornton from Los Angeles to Washington, and Sebastian Telfair from Los Angeles to Cleveland. Gooden changed his number from #90 to #0 during his tenure with the Clippers.

=== Milwaukee Bucks (2010–2013) ===
On July 1, 2010, Gooden agreed to a 5-year/$32 million contract with the Milwaukee Bucks, which would make the Bucks his ninth team in as many seasons in the league. On April 9, 2011, he recorded his first career triple-double in a win over the Cavaliers with 15 points, 13 rebounds, and 13 assists.

On March 7, 2012, Gooden scored a season high 27 points during a 106–104 loss to the Chicago Bulls. On March 14, Gooden recorded his second career triple-double in a win over the Cavaliers with 15 points, 10 rebounds, and 13 assists.

On July 16, 2013, the Bucks waived Gooden using the NBA's amnesty clause.

=== Washington Wizards (2014–2016) ===
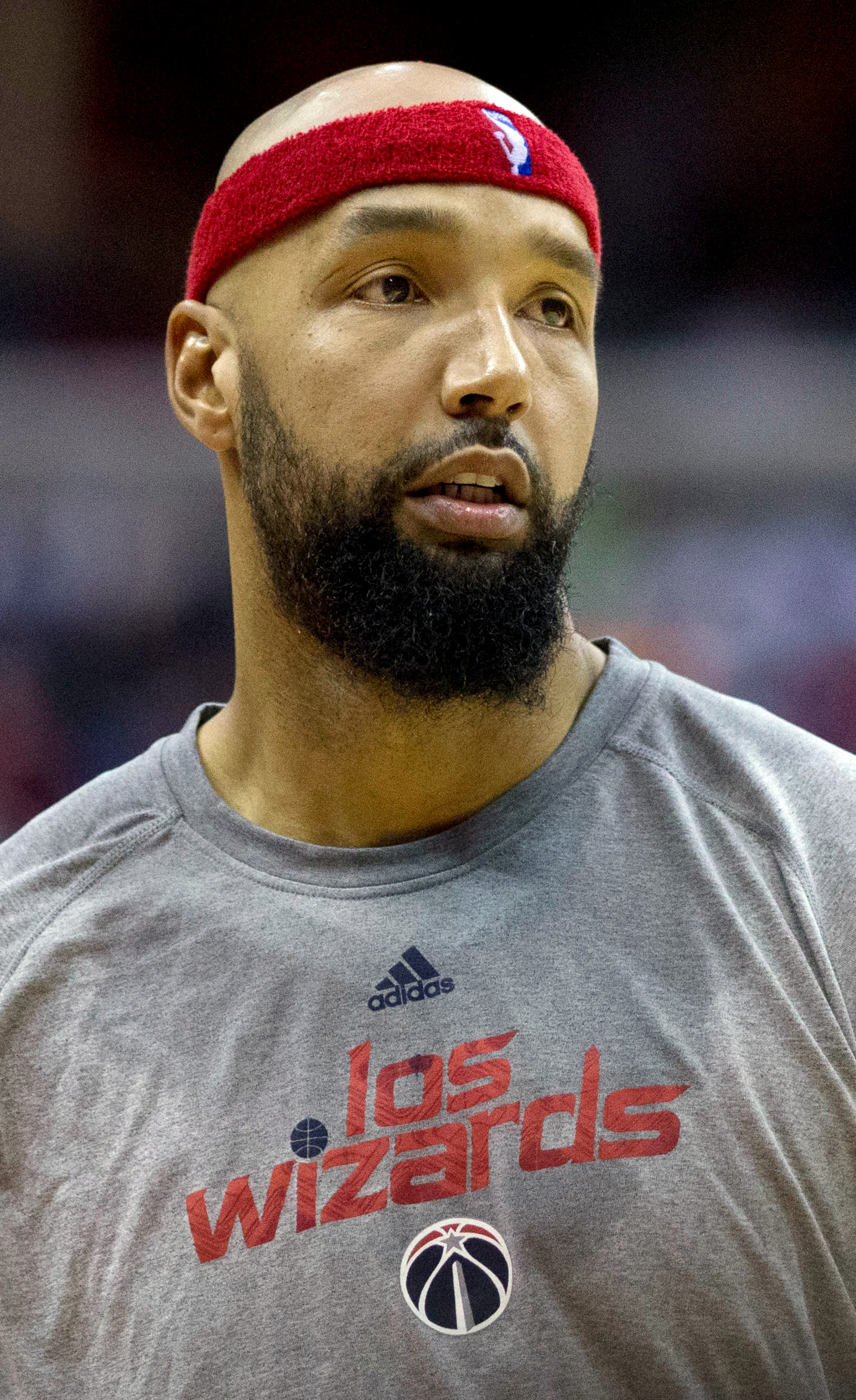
Gooden with the Washington Wizards in 2014

On February 26, 2014, Gooden signed a 10-day contract with the Washington Wizards. On March 8, 2014, he signed a second 10-day contract with the Wizards. On March 18, 2014, he signed with the Wizards for the rest of the season.

On July 18, 2014, Gooden re-signed with the Wizards. In the team's season opener on October 29, 2014, against the Miami Heat, Gooden was named the starting power forward in what was his first of just seven starts for the season. He subsequently scored a season-high 18 points and did not top that mark for the rest of the season.

On July 13, 2015, Gooden again re-signed with the Wizards.

Gooden's final NBA game was played on April 13, 2016, in a 109 – 98 win over the Atlanta Hawks; he recorded one point and one steal in two minutes of playing time. On July 7, 2016, the Wizards declined their option on Gooden's contract, making him an unrestricted free agent.

In February 2018, Drew Gooden joined Ice Cube's BIG3 basketball league as co-captain of 3's Company.

== Personal life ==
Gooden's mother, Ulla, is Finnish; his father, Andrew Gooden, met her while playing pro basketball in Äänekoski, Finland. Gooden's parents divorced later on, and he stayed with his father in California. In August 2014, Gooden attempted to get Finnish citizenship in order to play for their national team, but he failed to do so before the 2014 FIBA Basketball World Cup.

Gooden enjoys playing the piano.

At the beginning of the 2006–07 season, Gooden appeared with a patch of hair on the back of his head. He refers to this hair style as a "duck tail." Gooden said, "It is drawing a lot of attention ... One thing I've found out is even negative publicity is good publicity. At least I had the (guts) to do it." He claims women love it: "I went from not getting compliments to now being sexy."

In 2012, Gooden opened a Wingstop restaurant franchise in Altamonte Springs, Florida.

In 2016, Gooden returned to the University of Kansas and earned his degree in communications.

== Career statistics ==
Legend
GP	Games played	GS	Games started	MPG	Minutes per game
FG%	Field goal percentage	3P%	3-point field goal percentage	FT%	Free throw percentage
RPG	Rebounds per game	APG	Assists per game	SPG	Steals per game
BPG	Blocks per game	PPG	Points per game	**Bold**	Career high

=== NBA ===
==== Regular season ====
Year	Team	GP	GS	MPG	FG%	3P%	FT%	RPG	APG	SPG	BPG	PPG
2002–03	Memphis	51	29	26.1	.443	.304	.697	5.8	1.2	.7	.4	12.1
2002–03	Orlando	19	18	28.6	.498	.000	.738	8.4	1.1	.8	.7	13.6
2003–04	Orlando	79	17	27.0	.445	.214	.637	6.5	1.1	.8	.9	11.6
2004–05	Cleveland	**82**	**80**	30.8	.492	.179	.810	9.2	1.6	**.9**	.9	14.4
2005–06	Cleveland	79	79	27.5	.512	.333	.682	8.4	.7	.7	.6	10.7
2006–07	Cleveland	80	**80**	28.0	.473	.167	.714	8.5	1.1	**.9**	.4	11.1
2007–08	Cleveland	51	51	30.7	.444	.000	.728	8.3	1.0	.7	.6	11.3
2007–08	Chicago	18	14	**31.0**	.461	.000	.813	9.3	1.7	.7	**1.3**	14.0
2008–09	Chicago	31	27	29.6	.457	.000	.866	8.6	1.4	.8	.5	13.1
2008–09	Sacramento	1	0	26.0	**.556**	.000	**1.000**	**13.0**	2.0	.0	.0	12.0
2008–09	San Antonio	19	1	16.8	.490	.000	.789	4.4	.2	.2	.2	9.8
2009–10	Dallas	46	11	22.4	.467	.167	.809	6.9	.6	.6	1.1	8.9
2009–10	L.A. Clippers	24	22	30.2	.492	.000	.921	9.4	.9	.6	.3	**14.8**
2010–11	Milwaukee	35	18	24.6	.431	.150	.794	6.8	1.3	.6	.5	11.3
2011–12	Milwaukee	56	46	26.2	.437	.291	.846	6.5	**2.6**	.8	.6	13.7
2012–13	Milwaukee	16	0	9.4	.328	.200	.688	1.9	.4	.3	.4	3.3
2013–14	Washington	22	0	18.0	.531	**.412**	.889	5.2	.7	.5	.3	8.3
2014–15	Washington	51	7	16.9	.399	.390	.773	4.4	1.0	.4	.2	5.4
2015–16	Washington	30	0	10.2	.320	.171	.643	2.8	.4	.3	.4	2.7
Career		790	500	25.5	.462	.257	.760	7.1	1.1	.7	.6	11.0

==== Playoffs ====
Year	Team	GP	GS	MPG	FG%	3P%	FT%	RPG	APG	SPG	BPG	PPG
2003	Orlando	7	7	**33.4**	.400	.000	.722	**12.7**	.6	.4	.9	**14.0**
2006	Cleveland	13	13	21.7	**.529**	–	.944	7.5	.6	.2	.2	8.2
2007	Cleveland	**20**	**20**	30.3	.493	.000	.769	8.0	**1.0**	**.5**	.5	11.4
2009	San Antonio	4	0	17.8	.333	.000	**1.000**	3.8	.3	.3	.3	7.3
2014	Washington	10	0	14.6	.368	.000	.750	4.3	.4	.3	.4	3.4
2015	Washington	10	0	17.8	.377	**.462**	.769	5.5	.8	.2	**1.0**	6.8
Career		64	40	23.7	.449	.324	.793	7.2	.7	.5	.3	9.2

=== College ===
*	Led NCAA Division I

Year	Team	GP	GS	MPG	FG%	3P%	FT%	RPG	APG	SPG	BPG	PPG
1999–2000	Kansas	33	8	20.8	.451	.313	.659	7.5	1.1	.7	.8	10.6
2000–01	Kansas	28	20	27.2	**.516**	**.400**	.648	8.4	1.7	.5	1.0	15.8
2001–02	Kansas	**37***	**36**	**30.2**	.504	.278	**.755**	**11.4**	**2.0**	**1.8**	**1.4**	**19.8**
Career		98	64	26.2	.493	.306	.698	9.2	1.6	1.1	1.1	15.6
