= Kirk Hinrich =

American basketball player (born 1981)

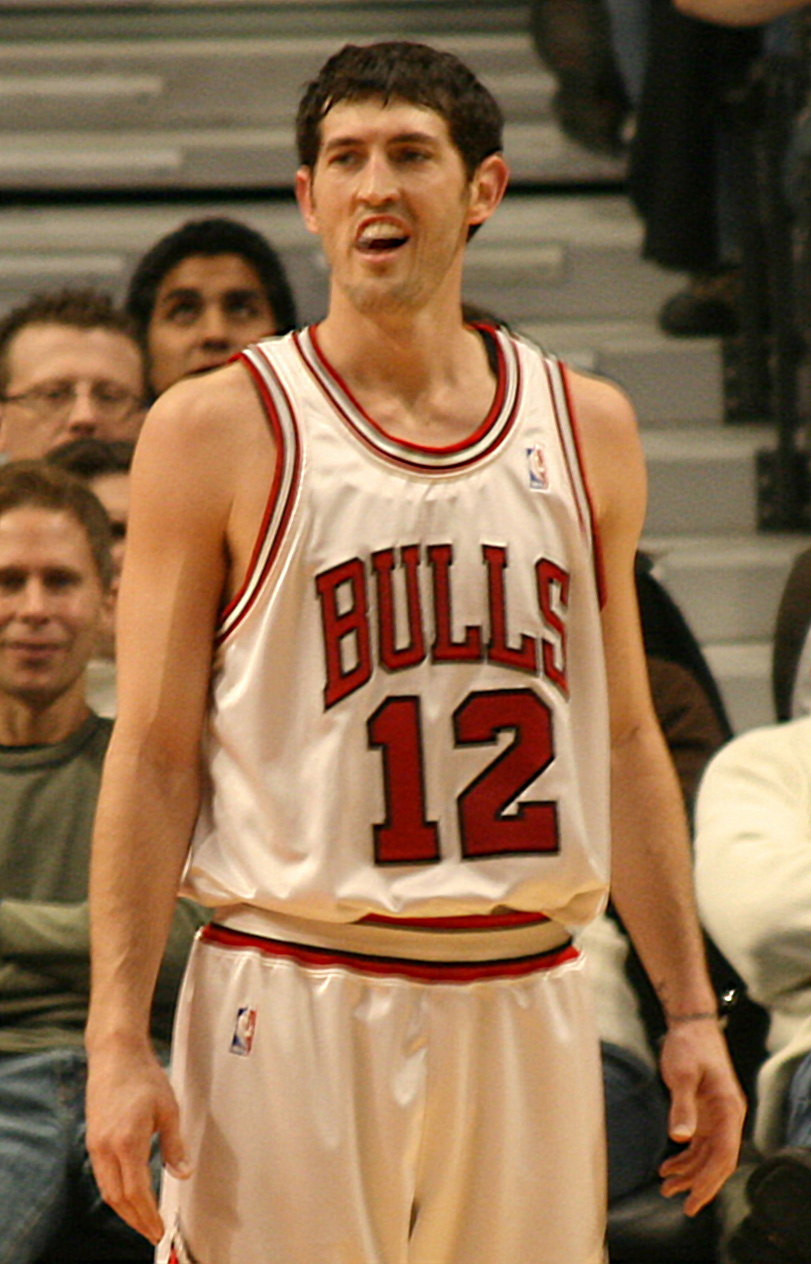
- Hinrich with the Chicago Bulls in 2008

Personal information
- Born: January 2, 1981 (age 45) Sioux City, Iowa, U.S.
- Listed height: 6 ft 4 in (1.93 m)
- Listed weight: 190 lb (86 kg)

Career information
- High school: Sioux City West (Sioux City, Iowa)
- College: Kansas (1999–2003)
- NBA draft: 2003: 1st round, 7th overall pick
- Drafted by: Chicago Bulls
- Playing career: 2003–2016
- Position: Point guard / shooting guard
- Number: 12, 6

Career history
- 2003–2010: Chicago Bulls
- 2010–2011: Washington Wizards
- 2011–2012: Atlanta Hawks
- 2012–2016: Chicago Bulls
- 2016: Atlanta Hawks

Career highlights
- NBA All-Defensive Second Team (2007); NBA All-Rookie First Team (2004); 2× Third-team All-American – NABC, TSN (2002, 2003); Third-team All-American – AP (2003); No. 10 retired by Kansas Jayhawks; Co–Iowa Mr. Basketball (1999)

Career NBA statistics
- Points: 9,594 (10.9 ppg)
- Rebounds: 2,576 (2.9 rpg)
- Assists: 4,245 (4.8 apg)
- Stats at NBA.com
- Stats at Basketball Reference
Medals
Representing United States
FIBA World Championship
Bronze medal – third place	2006 Japan	Team competition

Kirk James Hinrich (/ˈhaɪnrɪk/ HYNE-rik born January 2, 1981) is an American former professional basketball player. A point guard, he played in the NBA from 2003 to 2016 and was also a member of the U.S. national team.

Growing up in Sioux City, Iowa, Hinrich was exposed to basketball at an early age. His father, Jim, coached him from the third grade through high school. As a high school senior, Hinrich was named the 1999 Co-Iowa Mr. Basketball, along with future college teammate and roommate Nick Collison. Hinrich originally committed to play basketball at Iowa State but when the coach at the time, Tim Floyd, took the head coaching position for the NBA's Chicago Bulls, Hinrich changed his mind and decided to attend the University of Kansas. He helped Kansas to consecutive Final Fours in 2002 and 2003, his junior and senior seasons.

Hinrich was drafted by the Chicago Bulls with the seventh pick in the 2003 NBA Draft, where he earned the nickname "Captain Kirk". He was the Bulls' all-time leader in three-point field goals until November 2024 when this was surpassed by Zach LaVine. After seven seasons with the Bulls, he had short stints with the Washington Wizards and Atlanta Hawks before returning to the club in 2012. In 2016, he was traded back to the Atlanta Hawks.

== Early life ==
Hinrich was born to Jim and Nancy Hinrich of Sioux City, Iowa. His father played basketball at Briar Cliff College and later became a coach for Sioux City West High School. When Hinrich was about seven years old, Jim Hinrich visited Ray Nacke, his old college coach, and asked if Kirk could enroll in Nacke's summer camp for fourth, fifth, and sixth graders. Despite Nacke's hesitations, Hinrich was allowed to attend the camp, and played well against the older children. After just two years, Hinrich advanced to Nacke's camp for young teenagers, and excelled there, as well.

Hinrich also played football at the quarterback position, and baseball as a pitcher. However, basketball was Hinrich's passion. His role model was Seattle SuperSonics star Gary Payton, a player known for his strong defense. With his father as coach, Hinrich's basketball team at Sioux City West High School achieved an 82–9 record over four years, and won the Iowa state championship when Hinrich was a senior. When he graduated, Hinrich was West High's all-time leader in points, steals, and assists.

== College career ==
As a freshman with the University of Kansas Jayhawks, Hinrich tallied 123 assists and received the Clyde Lovellette Most Improved Player Award. The next year, he ranked eighth in the nation in assists per game (6.9), led his team in steals, and set a Kansas Jayhawks record with a .505 three-point shooting mark. Hinrich was also voted onto the Associated Press All-Big 12 Second Team and earned All Third Team status from the NCAA coaches.

In his fourth and final season at Kansas, Hinrich, along with power forward Nick Collison, led the Jayhawks to the Final Four, and was voted onto the All-Big 12 Second Team by coaches and the media. He led his team in free throw shooting and three-point shooting, contributed 5.0 assists per game and received Kansas' Ted Owens Defensive Player Award. Kansas lost to Syracuse in the championship Game but Hinrich was named the Midwest Region's Most Outstanding Player. He ranked second on his team in scoring and led it in three-pointers, while also contributing 3.5 assists per game, 3.9 rebounds per game and 1.9 steals a game. Following the season, he was named a third-team All-American by the Associated Press.

On March 1, 2009, Kansas retired Hinrich's number 10 jersey and raised it to the rafters of Allen Fieldhouse. Hinrich's was the 25th jersey to be retired by Kansas and is an honor reserved for the highest caliber of player, which includes names like Wilt Chamberlain and Paul Pierce. Hinrich was quoted as saying:

"I don't know if there's a greater honor in basketball than to have your jersey hanging in the most historic basketball building in the world. It's an unbelievable honor."

== Professional career ==
=== Chicago Bulls (2003–2010) ===
==== 2003 draft ====
Hinrich was selected by the Chicago Bulls in the 2003 NBA draft with the seventh overall pick, resulting in mild surprise because he had been expected to be a mid to late first-round draft pick. Some doubted that his college game would translate successfully to the professional league, in part because he played shooting guard for his final two years in college and was considered too small to play that position professionally. Hinrich's high selection in the draft is credited to a good workout in front of NBA team scouts. The Bulls needed a point guard, as Jay Williams was severely injured in a motorcycle accident. After being picked by the Bulls, Hinrich said he knew they had a need at point guard:

"I know Jay... [W]e came out of high school the same year. He's a great guy. I feel for him, but the rumors were Chicago was going to take a point guard, so I had a good chance to be drafted. The situation is tough. I know everyone is kind of in mourning about it. ... But if he's not able to play anymore, which I hope is not the case, they're going to have a need for a point guard."

==== 2003–04 season ====
Hinrich suffered an acute viral infection shortly before the beginning of his first season, requiring months to fully recover. However, he played well after his recovery, showing a continued good grasp of fundamental skills, solid playmaking, leadership, and a surprising defensive intensity. He solidified his position as the Bulls' starting point guard and was named to the NBA's 2004 All-Rookie first team. He held the distinction for being the only rookie during that season to record a triple-double, with 11 points, 12 rebounds and 10 assists versus the Golden State Warriors on February 28, 2004. During this same season, Hinrich's shot accuracy inside the three-point line (38.6 percent on field goals) was actually poorer than from behind it (39.0 percent on three-pointers). Hinrich was named to the NBA's "Got Milk? All-Rookie First Team" along with Dwyane Wade, LeBron James, Carmelo Anthony, and Chris Bosh. He was also awarded the Bulls' Most Valuable Player (MVP) Award or Player of the Year award (POY) for the 2003–04 season.

==== 2004–05 season ====
In his second year, Hinrich's field goal percentage went up to .397, a marginal improvement. Hinrich is known for his intense on-court demeanor; he was involved in a minor scuffle between the Bulls and the Washington Wizards in the preseason of his second year in the league, for which he was fined $10,000. On a drive to the basket, then Wizards player Larry Hughes head butted Hinrich out of bounds, which prompted Bulls players Antonio Davis and Eddy Curry to get into a small fight with Wizards center Brendan Haywood. Hughes, Haywood, Curry and Davis were all suspended at least one game by the NBA. The Bulls later met the Wizards in the first round of the playoffs and the possible start of a rivalry was born. Though he began his second year as the team's starting point guard, he was moved to the shooting guard spot nine games into the season due to the team's 0–9 start. Ben Gordon was moved to the bench, as the Bulls' sixth man. The player who took over the starting point guard spot was rookie Chris Duhon. After this move was made, the Bulls started to gain team chemistry and the starting line-up was geared more towards defense, with Gordon coming off the bench to spark the team's scoring. The Bulls then made a run throughout the rest of the season to finish 47–35, becoming the first team ever to start off 0–9 and reach the playoffs, where they earned the 4th seed in the Eastern Conference. After winning the first two games of their series with the Washington Wizards, they lost the next four, including a last-second loss at home in game 5, and were eliminated. During the off-season the Bulls exercised the fourth-year option on Hinrich's contract, making him signed through the 2006–07 season. Hinrich improved in virtually every statistical category in 2004–05, including scoring (15.8 ppg), shooting (just under 40 percent from the field), rebounding (3.9 rpg) and defense (122 steals).

==== 2005–06 season ====
In his third year in the NBA, Hinrich's field-goal percentage went up to 41%, although his three-point shooting accuracy fell to 35%. His career free throw shooting average is 80.5%, making him one of the better free throw shooters on the Bulls. The team traded away Antonio Davis and Eddy Curry in the off-season and the team struggled until making a late-season run to gain the seventh seed in the playoffs where they faced the eventual champs, the Miami Heat, in the first round. It was in the third game of the series that the Heat's James Posey shoulder tackled Hinrich, as he ran the fastbreak. Hinrich ended the 2005–06 season averaging a career high 15.9 ppg, a team-high 6.4 apg, and 3.6 rpg, while shooting a career high 41.8% from the field and a then career high 81.5% from the free throw line. He was the only member of the Chicago Bulls to average more than one steal per game in the 2005–06 campaign.

Hinrich received a multi-year contract extension on October 31, 2006, which was the deadline for the deal. (Otherwise Hinrich would have become a restricted free agent). Bulls GM John Paxson was quoted as saying,

"Kirk Hinrich is imperative to the foundation of our organization and we are extremely pleased to have him with us long term. We are attempting to build a team based on character and commitment and these are both traits that Kirk possesses at a very high level. This is a very good day for the Chicago Bulls organization."

==== 2006–07 season ====
Hinrich improved his stats in shooting and scoring during the 2006–07 season, his fourth in the NBA, with career highs in field goal, 3-point field goal, and free throw shooting percentage, as well as a career high 16.6 ppg. However, Hinrich's assists average was the lowest of his career and he also grabbed the fewest rebounds per game of his career.

In a game against the Miami Heat, Dwyane Wade injured his wrist while being defended by Hinrich. Heat coach Pat Riley suggested that Hinrich injured Dwyane Wade's wrist on purpose.

"Hinrich pulled his hand. He does it all the time that's what he does. Anytime Dwyane comes off screens, they will always grab his shirt or grab his hands. It's a tactic down below the body the official can't see it. He had Dwyane's hand, and [when Wade] tried to pull it out of there, I think something happened."

Hinrich was then played a recording of what Riley said; his response was candid, as he responded by saying

"I can't worry about Pat Riley, I just have to worry about myself, he's going to try and do his job, and I'm going to try and do my job. I can't really comment on what he should be worrying about. It's unfortunate [Wade] got hurt, but I wasn't trying to hurt him. I was chasing him off a screen then there's contact. I don't know if he got tangled up or whatever, and he started grabbing his hand."

When Hinrich's teammate Ben Gordon heard Riley's comments, he came to his defense stating "I heard him saying something about Kirk. Posey's was way more blatant. I don't think Kirk did anything. He was just playing aggressive defense. Kirk didn't do anything dirty. I don't appreciate him taking shots at our guys." Sports Illustrated columnist Chris Mannix called Riley's comments "on the border of hypocrisy" while maintaining that Hinrich's grab of Wade's wrist, while illegal, was not a dirty play. "For starters, the play itself hardly qualifies as dirty. That was not the word Riley chose, but it was certainly what he insinuated. Illegal, yes. But dirty?" "Hinrich had no intention of hurting Wade. He didn't grab his wrist and twist it. He didn't chop down on it with his other hand." He went on to describe plays like that commonplace in the NBA, while calling Posey's foul on Hinrich during the 2006 playoffs dirty. "Dirty was the cheap shot that James Posey delivered to Hinrich when he leveled the guard with a body check during last season's playoffs."

Riley later had a different view on his comments; the next time the Bulls and Heat played Riley was questioned about the comments he made by a reporter.

"I didn't accuse him of anything, I'm going to tell you exactly what I think about him, OK? I think he's one of the top defenders in the game, in the league. He reminds me of Jerry Sloan, he reminds me of Michael Cooper. And just like the Chicago Bulls whined about Dwyane, who was getting too many free throws, a great defender like Kirk Hinrich gets away with more." "He's into you, he's relentless. He has a reputation as a tough defender and he gets away with more."

During the Bulls' first game of the 2007 playoffs against the Miami Heat, Hinrich threw his mouthpiece into the stands after being assessed a charging foul. Hinrich received a technical foul for his actions as well as a $25,000 fine.

Technically Hinrich should have been ejected from the game but he was allowed to stay in. Bulls coach Scott Skiles was quoted as saying "What Kirk did the other (day), that's supposed to be an automatic ejection. They didn't see it. Hopefully, nothing like that happens again." The Bulls went on to sweep the Heat, before being eliminated in 6 games by the Detroit Pistons.

Hinrich was named to the NBA's All Defensive second team in the 06–07 season. Hinrich received 7 first team votes and 4 second team votes, for a total of 18 points. Hinrich joined teammate Ben Wallace on the 06–07 All Defensive second team.

==== 2007–08 season ====
In the season, Hinrich's numbers dropped across the board, averaging then-career lows in points (11.5), assists (6.0), rebounds (3.3), and minutes played (31.7). He only appeared in 75 games and started 72 of them due to minor injuries. The Bulls missed the playoffs in the 2007–08 season finishing with a dismal 33–49 season.

Hinrich scored a career-high 38 points in a win over the Indiana Pacers on January 23, 2008.

==== 2008–09 season ====
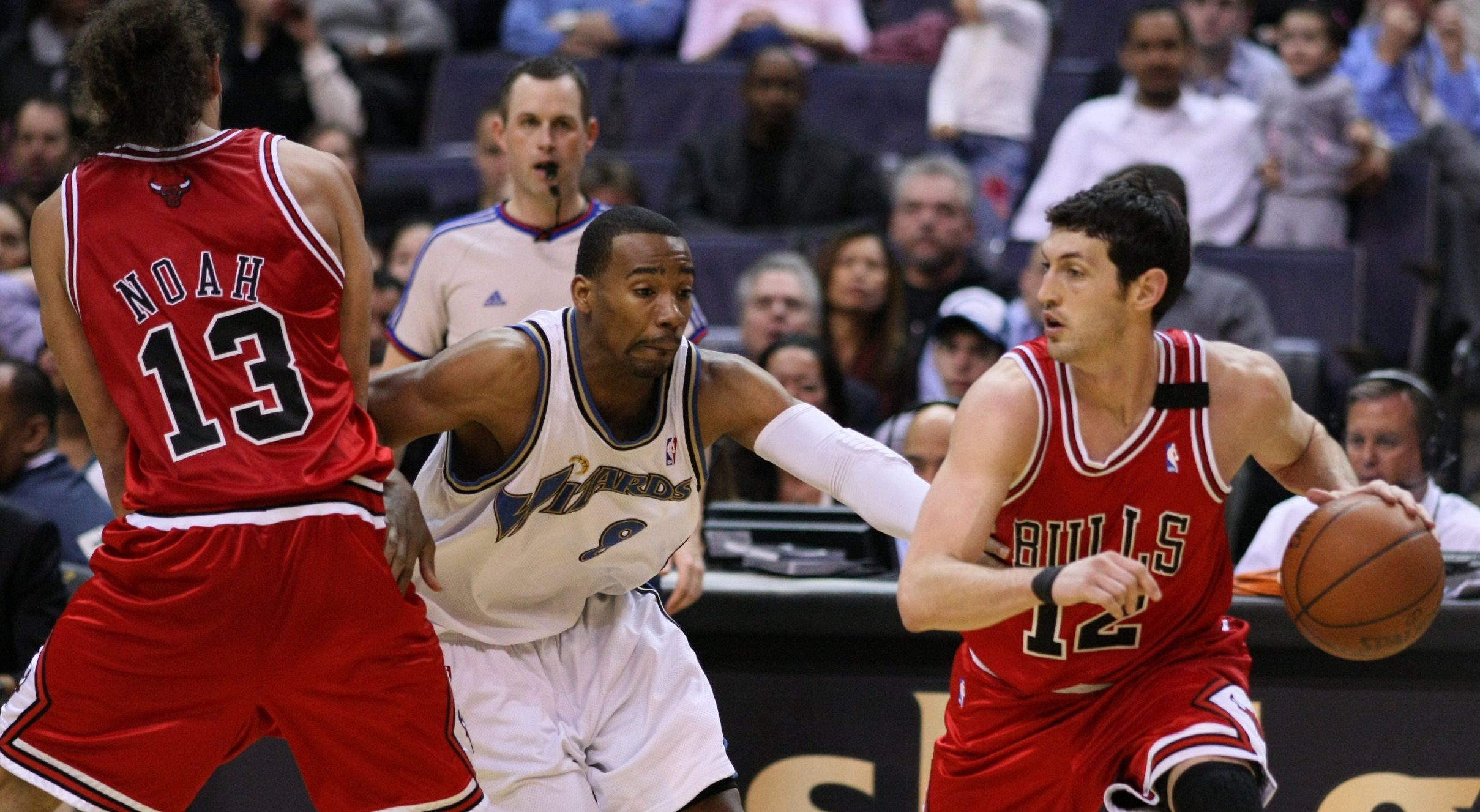
Hinrich (right) with the Bulls in 2009

Due to the arrival of number one pick Derrick Rose, Hinrich was relegated to a backup role at the point guard position for the 2008–2009 season. Injuries also held him to just 51 games played on the season, with only 4 starts.

During the 2009 NBA Playoffs Hinrich averaged 30.0 minutes per game, 2.9 assists per game, 1.7 steals per game and 12.6 points per game. The Bulls lost to the Celtics in the first round of the playoffs in a thrilling seven-game series.

==== 2009–10 season ====
On February 20, 2010, in a game against the Philadelphia 76ers, Hinrich became the Bulls' all-time leader in three-point field goals, surpassing Ben Gordon's record of 770. On April 13, 2010, Hinrich produced a season high 30 points in a 101–93 win over the Boston Celtics.

Hinrich finished the season averaging 10.9 points per game, 4.5 assists per game, and 1.2 steals per game as the Bulls made the final 8th seed spot in the Eastern Conference playoffs. In the playoffs, Hinrich averaged 12.4 points and 4 assists per game, but the Bulls lost to the Cleveland Cavaliers in five games.

=== Washington Wizards (2010–2011) ===
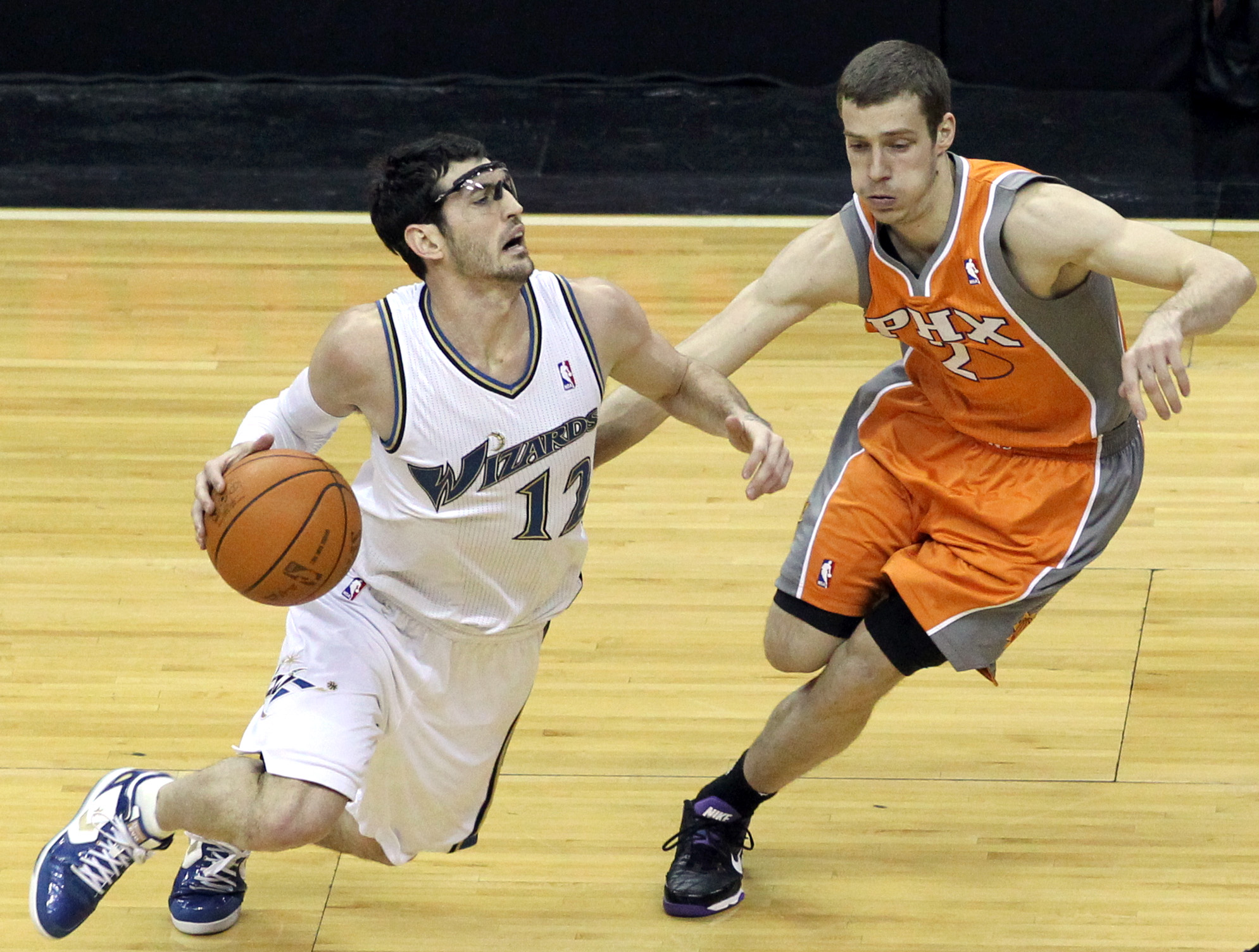
Hinrich during his tenure with the Wizards in 2011

On July 8, 2010, Hinrich was traded to the Washington Wizards along with draft rights to forward Kevin Seraphin in exchange for draft rights to Vladimir Veremeenko. Hinrich began to wear glasses during gameplay during his tenure with the Wizards after learning from Wizards optometrist Keith Smithson that he could lose sight in his left eye if he was hit. In his short tenure with the Wizards, he averaged 11.1 points, 4.4 assists and 2.2 rebounds per game.

=== Atlanta Hawks (2011–2012) ===
On February 23, 2011, Hinrich was traded to the Atlanta Hawks along with Hilton Armstrong in exchange for Mike Bibby, Jordan Crawford, Maurice Evans and a first-round pick in the 2011 NBA draft. At the end of the 2010–11 season, the Hawks made the playoffs as the fifth seed in the Eastern Conference. In Game 6 of the first round against the Orlando Magic, Hinrich injured his hamstring and subsequently missed the entire second round of the playoffs in which the Hawks ended up losing to Hinrich's former team, the Chicago Bulls.

Hinrich missed the first eighteen games of the 2011–12 NBA season after undergoing left shoulder surgery. During the season, Hinrich averaged career lows in points per game at 6.6, assists per game at 2.8, and minutes per game at 25.8.

=== Return to Chicago (2012–2016) ===
On July 23, 2012, Hinrich signed a two-year contract to return to the Chicago Bulls.

In the absence of point guard Derrick Rose, Kirk began the 2012–13 season as the Bulls' starting point guard. Hinrich struggled with various injuries throughout the campaign, including an elbow infection and a stress reaction in his foot, shooting just 38% from the field. He finished the year averaging 7.7 points, 5.2 assists, 2.6 rebounds, and 1.1 steals in 29 minutes per game. On April 27, 2013, Hinrich played an excellent game in Game 4 of Round 1 of the 2013 NBA Playoffs vs. the Nets, scoring 18 points and dishing out 14 assists in 60 minutes of the action as the Bulls defeated the Nets 142–134 in triple overtime to give the Bulls a 3–1 series lead. However, Hinrich missed the rest of the postseason after rupturing his calf in the second quarter of that game. The Bulls were eliminated in the second round by the Miami Heat.

Hinrich started the 2013–14 season as a bench player backing up Derrick Rose, but when Rose suffered a torn meniscus ending his season just 10 games in, Hinrich again became the starter. While he struggled to start the year, shooting just 36.4% from the field and 28% on 3 pointers, he improved immensely following the All-Star Break, shooting 42.8% from the field and 43.7% from 3 for the remainder of the season. He also enjoyed a much healthier regular season campaign, with his 73 games played being his most since the 2009–10 season. His 9.1 points per game average was also his highest since the 2010–11 season.

On July 21, 2014, Hinrich re-signed with the Bulls to a reported two-year, $5.6 million contract.

On June 29, 2015, Hinrich exercised his player option with the Bulls for the 2015–16 season.

=== Return to Atlanta (2016) ===
On February 18, 2016, Hinrich was traded to the Atlanta Hawks in a three-team trade involving the Bulls and the Utah Jazz. Hinrich's final NBA game was Game 2 of the 2016 Eastern Conference Semifinals on May 4, 2016. In that game, the Hawks would lose 98 – 123 to the Cleveland Cavaliers with Hinrich recording 3 points and 2 rebounds.

== International career ==
In July 2006, Hinrich was officially named to the U.S. national basketball team that would compete in the 2008 Summer Olympics in Beijing, China. He was initially invited to participate in February 2006, but declined due to the pressure of making a decision in the midst of a competitive NBA season with the Chicago Bulls. After his 2005–06 season ended, however, Hinrich changed his mind and accepted a spot on the team's roster. Hinrich said of the incident:

"When I initially turned it down, I don't know if I really knew what I was doing. It was in the middle of a long season. I was focused on what we were doing. After the season was over, I was thinking that I someday might regret it. To get another chance to reconsider, I feel lucky."

The roster first fielded more than 20 players, but it was soon cut down to 15 players, among which was Hinrich. When the final roster was announced, Hinrich was chosen as one of the 12 players set to compete in the FIBA World Championship in Japan. After Hinrich learned of his grandfather's death, he briefly left the US training camp in Las Vegas early in the morning of July 25 and returned to his hometown of Sioux City, Iowa.

Hinrich started an exhibition game against Lithuania on August 13, 2006, and scored 10 points and 2 steals in a US win. After the game, Hinrich was asked about starting the game. He responded, "We're playing in groups right now. I know when I get my time, I just try to make the best of it, make sure our team is successful. It's one of those deals when you play in groups in spurts like that, it's a little bit tougher. But, you don't hold back and give it everything you got because you know you'll be rested a lot."

In the FIBA world Championship semi-final, Team USA played against the Greece national team. With 2:41 to play in the game, Hinrich connected on a three-point shot to bring the US within 5 points, but was then called for an unsportsmanlike foul on Greece center Sofoklis Schortsanitis. With 45 seconds left, he knocked down another three-pointer to pull the US within four. Hinrich was then fouled out when he intentionally hit a Greek player to stop the shot clock. Despite the US effort, the Greek sealed the deal with free throws and won 101–95. The US team then played against the Argentinian team for the bronze medal. In the game, Hinrich played against his former Bulls' teammate Andrés Nocioni. The US went on to win 96–81, and took home the bronze medal.

Hinrich dropped out of the U.S. training camp for the FIBA Americas Championship in 2007, citing personal reasons.

The Chicago Tribune reported that Hinrich dropped out of his commitment to the US national team so that he could focus on his wedding, and to "hitting the weights" hard. In April 2008, Hinrich revealed that he would not play for Team USA in the Beijing Olympics since his wife was expecting a baby. He said of the Olympics, "It wasn't like I was upset about anything. It just wasn't working out for me."

== Personal life ==
Hinrich was engaged to Jill Fisher in 2006. He married her on July 7, 2007. His wife gave birth to their first child, a daughter named Kenzie, in 2008. Hinrich's wife gave birth to their second daughter, Kyla, in September 2011. On September 12, 2014, Hinrich's wife gave birth to twins, a boy, Kolton, and a girl, Kinley. During his NBA career, Hinrich lived in Bannockburn, Illinois. Upon retiring from the NBA in 2017, Hinrich and his family moved to Sioux Falls, South Dakota, where Hinrich was hired at Sanford Power as a lead basketball specialist.

== NBA career statistics ==
Legend
GP	Games played	GS	Games started	MPG	Minutes per game
FG%	Field goal percentage	3P%	3-point field goal percentage	FT%	Free throw percentage
RPG	Rebounds per game	APG	Assists per game	SPG	Steals per game
BPG	Blocks per game	PPG	Points per game	**Bold**	Career high

=== Regular season ===
Year	Team	GP	GS	MPG	FG%	3P%	FT%	RPG	APG	SPG	BPG	PPG
2003–04	Chicago	76	66	35.6	.386	.390	.804	3.4	**6.8**	1.3	.3	12.0
2004–05	Chicago	77	77	36.4	.397	.355	.792	**3.9**	6.4	**1.6**	.3	15.7
2005–06	Chicago	**81**	**81**	**36.5**	.418	.370	.815	3.6	6.3	1.2	.3	15.9
2006–07	Chicago	80	80	35.5	.448	.415	.835	3.4	6.3	1.3	.3	**16.6**
2007–08	Chicago	75	72	31.7	.414	.350	.831	3.3	6.0	1.2	.3	11.5
2008–09	Chicago	51	4	26.3	.437	.408	.791	2.4	3.9	1.3	**.4**	9.9
2009–10	Chicago	74	53	33.5	.409	.371	.752	3.5	4.5	1.1	.3	10.9
2010–11	Washington	48	29	30.6	**.452**	.384	.876	2.7	4.4	1.2	.2	11.1
2010–11	Atlanta	24	22	28.6	.432	**.421**	.667	2.2	3.3	.8	.3	8.6
2011–12	Atlanta	48	31	25.8	.414	.346	.781	2.1	2.8	.8	.2	6.6
2012–13	Chicago	60	60	29.4	.377	.390	.714	2.6	5.2	1.1	**.4**	7.7
2013–14	Chicago	73	61	29.0	.393	.351	.760	2.6	3.9	1.1	**.4**	9.1
2014–15	Chicago	66	22	24.4	.373	.345	.700	1.8	2.2	.7	.2	5.7
2015–16	Chicago	35	7	15.9	.398	.411	**.938**	1.7	1.7	.4	.0	3.8
2015–16	Atlanta	11	0	6.9	.182	.167	.000	1.1	1.3	.2	.1	.5
Career		879	665	30.7	.411	.375	.800	2.9	4.9	1.1	.3	10.9

=== Playoffs ===
Year	Team	GP	GS	MPG	FG%	3P%	FT%	RPG	APG	SPG	BPG	PPG
2005	Chicago	6	6	35.5	.450	.515	.690	3.7	5.8	**2.0**	**.7**	**21.2**
2006	Chicago	6	6	39.0	.415	.346	.857	3.3	**7.7**	1.3	.3	20.5
2007	Chicago	**10**	**10**	36.2	.376	.302	.769	4.2	7.5	.9	.3	12.1
2009	Chicago	7	0	30.0	.468	.433	.680	2.7	2.9	1.7	.4	12.6
2010	Chicago	5	5	39.2	.423	.500	.714	**4.4**	4.0	1.4	.0	12.4
2011	Atlanta	6	6	28.8	**.500**	.421	**1.000**	2.3	2.7	1.2	.3	10.2
2012	Atlanta	6	4	23.5	.433	.375	**1.000**	2.0	1.0	.7	.0	5.7
2013	Chicago	4	4	**40.5**	.432	.364	.643	2.8	5.8	**2.0**	.3	11.3
2014	Chicago	5	5	33.4	.411	.368	.500	3.0	4.4	.8	.2	11.0
2015	Chicago	**10**	0	12.6	.474	**.600**	.667	.5	1.1	.3	.1	2.6
2016	Atlanta	6	0	4.5	.286	.333	.000	.7	.5	.0	.0	.8
Career		71	46	28.3	.428	.407	.744	2.6	3.9	1.0	.2	10.5
