= 2009–10 New York Knicks season =

Season of National Basketball Association team the New York Knicks

- Head coach: Mike D'Antoni
- President: Donnie Walsh
- General manager: Donnie Walsh
- Owner: James Dolan
- Arena: Madison Square Garden

Results
- Record: 29–53 (.354)
- Place: Division: 3rd (Atlantic); Conference: 11th (Eastern)
- Playoff finish: Did not qualify
- Stats at Basketball Reference

Local media
- Television: MSG Network, MSG Plus
- Radio: WEPN

The 2009–10 New York Knicks season was the 64th season of the New York Knicks in the National Basketball Association (NBA).

== Key dates ==
- June 25 – The 2009 NBA draft took place in New York City.
- July 8 – The free agency period started.

== Draft ==
Round	Pick	Player	Position(s)	Nationality	College / Club
1	8	Jordan Hill	PF/C	United States	Arizona
1	29	Toney Douglas	PG	United States	Florida State

== Roster ==
2009–10 New York Knicks roster
Players

Pos.	No.	Player	Height	Weight	DOB	From
F/C	30	Earl Barron	7 ft 0 in (2.13 m)	245 lb (111 kg)	1981-08-14	Memphis
F	9	Jonathan Bender (injured)	7 ft 0 in (2.13 m)	230 lb (104 kg)	1981-01-30	Picayune Memorial HS (MS)
F	21	Wilson Chandler (injured)	6 ft 8 in (2.03 m)	225 lb (102 kg)	1987-05-10	DePaul
C	34	Eddy Curry (injured)	7 ft 0 in (2.13 m)	295 lb (134 kg)	1982-12-05	Thornwood HS (IL)
G	23	Toney Douglas	6 ft 1 in (1.85 m)	200 lb (91 kg)	1986-03-16	Florida State
G	1	Chris Duhon	6 ft 1 in (1.85 m)	190 lb (86 kg)	1982-08-31	Duke
F	8	Danilo Gallinari	6 ft 10 in (2.08 m)	225 lb (102 kg)	1988-08-08	Italy
G	4	J. R. Giddens	6 ft 5 in (1.96 m)	215 lb (98 kg)	1985-02-13	New Mexico
F	7	Al Harrington (injured)	6 ft 9 in (2.06 m)	250 lb (113 kg)	1980-02-17	SPHS (NJ)
G	50	Eddie House	6 ft 1 in (1.85 m)	175 lb (79 kg)	1978-05-14	Arizona State
F/C	42	David Lee	6 ft 9 in (2.06 m)	250 lb (113 kg)	1983-04-29	Florida
G/F	3	Tracy McGrady	6 ft 8 in (2.03 m)	223 lb (101 kg)	1979-05-24	Mount Zion Christian Academy (NC)
G	13	Sergio Rodríguez	6 ft 3 in (1.91 m)	176 lb (80 kg)	1986-06-12	Spain
G/F	5	Bill Walker	6 ft 6 in (1.98 m)	220 lb (100 kg)	1987-10-09	Kansas State

Coaches
Head coach
- Mike D'Antoni
Assistant(s)
- Kenny Atkinson
- Greg Brittenham
- Dan D'Antoni
- Phil Weber
- Herb Williams

Legend
- (DP) Unsigned draft pick
- (FA) Free agent
- (S) Suspended
- Injured

Roster
Updated: March 13, 2010

== Pre-season ==
=== Game log ===
2009 preseason game log
Total: 0–0 (Home: 0–0; Road: 0–0)
Preseason: 0–0 (home: 0–0; road: 0–0)

Game	Date	Team	Score	High points	High rebounds	High assists	Location Attendance	Record
1	October 18	Maccabi Tel Aviv B.C.					Madison Square Garden	
2	October 22	@ New Jersey					Prudential Center	

2009–10 season schedule

== Regular season ==
=== Standings ===
Atlantic Division	W	L	PCT	GB	Home	Road	Div
y-Boston Celtics	50	32	.610	–	24–17	26–15	13–3
Toronto Raptors	40	42	.488	10	25–16	15–26	11–5
New York Knicks	29	53	.354	21	18–23	11–30	6–10
Philadelphia 76ers	27	55	.329	23	12–29	15–26	7–9
New Jersey Nets	12	70	.146	38	8–33	4–37	3–13

#	Eastern Conference				
#	Team	W	L	PCT	GB
1	z-Cleveland Cavaliers	61	21	.744	–
2	y-Orlando Magic	59	23	.720	2
3	x-Atlanta Hawks	53	29	.646	8
4	y-Boston Celtics	50	32	.610	11
5	x-Miami Heat	47	35	.573	14
6	x-Milwaukee Bucks	46	36	.561	15
7	x-Charlotte Bobcats	44	38	.537	17
8	x-Chicago Bulls	41	41	.500	20
9	Toronto Raptors	40	42	.488	21
10	Indiana Pacers	32	50	.390	29
11	New York Knicks	29	53	.354	32
12	Philadelphia 76ers	27	55	.329	34
13	Detroit Pistons	27	55	.329	34
14	Washington Wizards	26	56	.317	35
15	New Jersey Nets	12	70	.146	49

=== Game log ===
2009–10 game log
Total: 29–53 (Home: 18–23; Road: 11–30)
October: 0–3 (home: 0–1; road: 0–2)

Game	Date	Team	Score	High points	High rebounds	High assists	Location Attendance	Record
1	October 28	@ Miami	L 93–115	Danilo Gallinari, David Lee (22)	David Lee (9)	Chris Duhon (5)	AmericanAirlines Arena; 19,600	0–1
2	October 30	@ Charlotte	L 100–102 (2OT)	Al Harrington, David Lee, Nate Robinson (17)	David Lee (18)	Chris Duhon (8)	Time Warner Cable Arena; 18,624	0–2
3	October 31	Philadelphia	L 127–141 (OT)	Al Harrington (42)	Wilson Chandler, Al Harrington (6)	Chris Duhon, Larry Hughes (6)	Madison Square Garden; 19,763	0–3

November: 3–11 (home: 1–7; road: 2–4)

Game	Date	Team	Score	High points	High rebounds	High assists	Location Attendance	Record
4	November 2	New Orleans	W 117–111	David Lee (28)	Al Harrington, David Lee (8)	Chris Duhon (9)	Madison Square Garden; 19,763	1–3
5	November 4	Indiana	L 89–101	Al Harrington (22)	David Lee (19)	Chris Duhon (6)	Madison Square Garden; 19,273	1–4
6	November 6	Cleveland	L 91–100	David Lee (21)	David Lee, Wilson Chandler (6)	Chris Duhon (8)	Madison Square Garden; 15,874	1–5
7	November 7	@ Milwaukee	L 87–102	David Lee (18)	David Lee (7)	David Lee, Larry Hughes, Chris Duhon (4)	Bradley Center; 15,486	1–6
8	November 9	Utah	L 93–95	Toney Douglas (21)	Wilson Chandler (10)	Larry Hughes (5)	Madison Square Garden; 19,355	1–7
9	November 11	Atlanta	L 101–114	Toney Douglas, Al Harrington (23)	Al Harrington (12)	Larry Hughes (8)	Madison Square Garden; 19,699	1–8
10	November 13	Golden State	L 107–121	Danilo Gallinari (19)	Danilo Gallinari (10)	Chris Duhon (7)	Madison Square Garden; 19,763	1–9
11	November 18	@ Indiana	W 110–103	Al Harrington (26)	Larry Hughes (10)	Chris Duhon (8)	Conseco Fieldhouse; 12,258	2–9
12	November 21	@ New Jersey	W 98–91	Al Harrington, Danilo Gallinari (17)	David Lee (12)	Chris Duhon (8)	Izod Center; 14,050	3–9
13	November 22	Boston	L 105–107 (OT)	Al Harrington (30)	David Lee (16)	Chris Duhon (6)	Madison Square Garden; 19,763	3–10
14	November 24	@ Los Angeles Lakers	L 90–100	Nate Robinson, Wilson Chandler (15)	Wilson Chandler, David Lee (7)	Chris Duhon (6)	Staples Center; 18,997	3–11
15	November 25	@ Sacramento	L 97–111	David Lee, Nate Robinson (25)	David Lee (12)	Nate Robinson, Al Harrington (5)	ARCO Arena; 11,375	3–12
16	November 27	@ Denver	L 125–128	Al Harrington (41)	Al Harrington, David Lee (10)	Larry Hughes (9)	Pepsi Center; 19,155	3–13
17	November 29	Orlando	L 102–114	Nate Robinson (24)	David Lee (12)	Chris Duhon (9)	Madison Square Garden; 18,861	3–14

December: 9–6 (home: 6–2; road: 3–4)

Game	Date	Team	Score	High points	High rebounds	High assists	Location Attendance	Record
18	December 1	Phoenix	W 126–99	Danilo Gallinari (27)	Danilo Gallinari (10)	Larry Hughes (12)	Madison Square Garden; 19,763	4–14
19	December 2	@ Orlando	L 104–118	Wilson Chandler (24)	Danilo Gallinari (7)	Danilo Gallinari, Larry Hughes (3)	Amway Arena; 17,461	4–15
20	December 4	@ Atlanta	W 114–107	Al Harrington (27)	David Lee (17)	Chris Duhon (10)	Philips Arena; 17,165	5–15
21	December 6	New Jersey	W 106–97	Al Harrington (26)	Al Harrington (14)	Al Harrington, Chris Duhon (5)	Madison Square Garden; 19,602	6–15
22	December 7	Portland	W 93–84	Larry Hughes (21)	David Lee (10)	Chris Duhon (9)	Madison Square Garden; 19,763	7–15
23	December 11	@ New Orleans	W 113–96	Al Harrington (28)	David Lee (14)	Chris Duhon (9)	New Orleans Arena; 15,569	8–15
24	December 15	@ Charlotte	L 87–94	Chris Duhon (18)	David Lee (8)	Chris Duhon (6)	Time Warner Cable Arena; 13,606	8–16
25	December 17	@ Chicago	L 89–98	Chris Duhon, Danilo Gallinari, Al Harrington (18)	Jared Jeffries (9)	Chris Duhon (7)	United Center; 19,791	8–17
26	December 18	Los Angeles Clippers	W 95–91	David Lee (25)	David Lee (11)	Chris Duhon (10)	Madison Square Garden; 19,763	9–17
27	December 20	Charlotte	W 98–94	Wilson Chandler (26)	David Lee (15)	David Lee (7)	Madison Square Garden; 18,767	10–17
28	December 22	Chicago	W 88–81	Al Harrington (20)	David Lee (21)	David Lee (5)	Madison Square Garden; 19,763	11–17
29	December 25	Miami	L 87–93	Danilo Gallinari (26)	David Lee (16)	Danilo Gallinari, Chris Duhon (3)	Madison Square Garden; 19,763	11–18
30	December 27	San Antonio	L 88–95	David Lee (28)	David Lee (10)	Chris Duhon (13)	Madison Square Garden; 19,763	11–19
31	December 29	@ Detroit	W 104–87	David Lee (30)	David Lee (12)	Chris Duhon (7)	The Palace of Auburn Hills; 22,076	12–19
32	December 30	@ New Jersey	L 95–104	Al Harrington (25)	David Lee (15)	David Lee (8)	Izod Center; 17,575	12–20

January: 6–9 (home: 4–4; road: 2–5)

Game	Date	Team	Score	High points	High rebounds	High assists	Location Attendance	Record
33	January 1	@Atlanta	W 112–108 (OT)	Nate Robinson (41)	Wilson Chandler (17)	Nate Robinson (8)	Philips Arena; 17,366	13–20
34	January 3	Indiana	W 132–89	Wilson Chandler (23)	David Lee (16)	Chris Duhon (7)	Madison Square Garden; 19,763	14–20
35	January 7	Charlotte	W 97–93	Wilson Chandler (27)	Jared Jeffries (10)	Wilson Chandler, Chris Duhon (6)	Madison Square Garden; 19,763	15–20
36	January 9	@ Houston	L 96–105	David Lee (26)	David Lee (12)	David Lee (6)	Toyota Center; 15,693	15–21
37	January 11	@ Oklahoma City	L 88–106	Nate Robinson (19)	David Lee (13)	David Lee (4)	Ford Center; 17,152	15–22
38	January 13	@ Philadelphia	W 93–92	David Lee (24)	David Lee, Jared Jeffries (9)	Chris Duhon (7)	Wachovia Center; 12,444	16–22
39	January 15	Toronto	L 104–112	Al Harrington (31)	David Lee (14)	David Lee (9)	Madison Square Garden; 19,763	16–23
40	January 16	@Detroit	L 90–94	Danilo Gallinari (27)	David Lee (17)	David Lee (9)	The Palace of Auburn Hills; 19,185	16–24
41	January 18	Detroit	W 99–91	Nate Robinson (27)	David Lee (15)	David Lee, Chris Duhon (5)	Madison Square Garden; 19,302	17–24
42	January 22	Los Angeles	L 105–115	David Lee (31)	David Lee (17)	Chris Duhon (8)	Madison Square Garden; 19,673	17–25
43	January 24	Dallas	L 78–128	Jared Jeffries (14)	David Lee (14)	Chris Duhon (4)	Madison Square Garden; 19,418	17–26
44	January 26	Minnesota	W 132–105	David Lee (28)	David Lee (10)	Chris Duhon (13)	Madison Square Garden; 18,111	18–26
45	January 28	Toronto	L 104–106	David Lee (29)	David Lee (18)	Chris Duhon (9)	Madison Square Garden; 18,828	18–27
46	January 30	@ Washington	L 96–106	David Lee (24)	Danilo Gallinari (10)	David Lee (6)	Verizon Center; 16,233	18–28
47	January 31	@ Minnesota	L 91–112	Wilson Chandler (27)	David Lee (11)	Jared Jeffries (5)	Target Center; 13,711	18–29

February: 2–9 (home: 1–6; road: 1–3)

Game	Date	Team	Score	High points	High rebounds	High assists	Location Attendance	Record
48	February 3	Washington	W 107–85	Nate Robinson (23)	David Lee (10)	Nate Robinson (8)	Madison Square Garden; 19,225	19–29
49	February 5	Milwaukee	L 107–114	David Lee (32)	David Lee (15)	Nate Robinson (7)	Madison Square Garden; 19,247	19–30
50	February 6	@Cleveland	L 106–113	Nate Robinson (26)	David Lee (8)	Chris Duhon (8)	Quicken Loans Arena; 20,562	19–31
51	February 9	Sacramento	L 114–118 (OT)	Wilson Chandler (35)	David Lee, Jared Jeffries (10)	Chris Duhon (9)	Madison Square Garden; 19,531	19–32
52	February 16	@ Chicago	L 85–118	David Lee (24)	David Lee (12)	David Lee (4)	United Center; 20,989	19–33
53	February 17	Chicago	L 109–115	Al Harrington (27)	David Lee (12)	Chris Duhon (8)	Madison Square Garden; 19,763	19–34
54	February 20	Oklahoma City	L 118–121 (OT)	David Lee (30)	David Lee (10)	David Lee, Sergio Rodríguez (6)	Madison Square Garden; 19,763	19–35
55	February 22	Milwaukee	L 67–83	Tracy McGrady (15)	David Lee (13)	Eddie House (3)	Madison Square Garden; 19,763	19–36
56	February 23	@Boston	L 106–110	David Lee (28)	David Lee (15)	Tracy McGrady (8)	TD Garden; 18,624	19–37
57	February 26	@Washington	W 118–116 (OT)	Al Harrington (37)	David Lee (16)	Sergio Rodríguez (7)	Verizon Center; 17,408	20–37
58	February 27	Memphis	L 109–120	Al Harrington (31)	Wilson Chandler (8)	Wilson Chandler (5)	Madison Square Garden; 19,763	20–38

March: 6–10 (home: 4–2; road: 2–8)

Game	Date	Team	Score	High points	High rebounds	High assists	Location Attendance	Record
59	March 1	@ Cleveland	L 93–124	Bill Walker (21)	David Lee (10)	Toney Douglas (6)	Quicken Loans Arena; 20,562	20–39
60	March 3	Detroit	W 128–104	Al Harrington (26)	David Lee (18)	David Lee (6)	Madison Square Garden; 19,341	21–39
61	March 5	@Toronto	L 96–102	David Lee (23)	David Lee (18)	Sergio Rodríguez (7)	Air Canada Centre; 18,889	21–40
62	March 6	New Jersey	L 93–113	David Lee (23)	Wilson Chandler (10)	Tracy McGrady (7)	Madison Square Garden; 19,763	21–41
63	March 8	Atlanta	W 99–98	Danilo Gallinari (27)	David Lee (13)	Sergio Rodríguez (4)	Madison Square Garden; 19,763	22–41
64	March 10	@ San Antonio	L 87–97	David Lee (21)	David Lee (10)	David Lee (4)	AT&T Center; 18,278	22–42
65	March 12	@ Memphis	L 112–119	Bill Walker (21)	David Lee (14)	Wilson Chandler (4)	FedExForum; 12,236	22–43
66	March 13	@ Dallas	W 128–94	Bill Walker (23)	David Lee (14)	Toney Douglas (8)	American Airlines Center; 20,224	23–43
67	March 15	@ Philadelphia	W 94–84	Danilo Gallinari (21)	David Lee (16)	Toney Douglas (7)	Wachovia Center; 13,563	24–43
68	March 17	@Boston	L 97–109	David Lee (29)	David Lee (9)	David Lee (7)	TD Garden; 18,624	24–44
69	March 19	Philadelphia	W 92–88	Danilo Gallinari (25)	Al Harrington (13)	Tracy McGrady (3)	Madison Square Garden; 19,763	25–44
70	March 21	Houston	L 112–116	David Lee (27)	David Lee (20)	David Lee (6)	Madison Square Garden; 17,242	25–45
71	March 23	Denver	W 109–104	Danilo Gallinari (28)	David Lee (16)	Toney Douglas (7)	Madison Square Garden; 19,763	26–45
72	March 26	@ Phoenix	L 96–132	Al Harrington (24)	David Lee (13)	Tracy McGrady (5)	US Airways Center; 18,422	26–46
73	March 29	@Utah	L 98–103	Al Harrington (26)	Al Harrington (17)	Tracy McGrady (6)	EnergySolutions Arena; 19,911	26–47
74	March 31	@ Portland	L 90–118	David Lee (20)	David Lee (10)	David Lee (5)	Rose Garden Arena; 20,636	26–48

April: 3–5 (home: 2–1; road: 1–4)

Game	Date	Team	Score	High points	High rebounds	High assists	Location Attendance	Record
75	April 2	@ Golden State	L 117–128	David Lee (37)	David Lee (20)	David Lee (10)	Oracle Arena; 19,230	26–49
76	April 4	@ Los Angeles Clippers	W 113–107	David Lee (29)	David Lee (10)	Sergio Rodríguez (10)	Staples Center; 16,083	27–49
77	April 6	Boston	W 104–101	Danilo Gallinari (31)	Earl Barron (18)	Chris Duhon (8)	Madison Square Garden; 19,763	28–49
78	April 7	@Indiana	L 105–113	Toney Douglas (20)	David Lee (16)	Tracy McGrady (6)	Conseco Fieldhouse; 15,330	28–50
79	April 9	@ Orlando	L 103–118	Danilo Gallinari (28)	Earl Barron (12)	Chris Duhon (5)	Amway Arena; 17,461	28–51
80	April 11	Miami	L 98–111	David Lee (26)	Earl Barron (12)	David Lee (5)	Madison Square Garden; 19,763	28–52
81	April 12	Washington	W 114–103	David Lee (26)	Earl Barron (13)	Toney Douglas (5)	Madison Square Garden; 19,763	29–52
82	April 14	@Toronto	L 113–131	Bill Walker (28)	David Lee (11)	Toney Douglas, Chris Duhon, David Lee (5)	Air Canada Centre; 18,333	29–53

2009–10 season schedule

== Player statistics ==
Legend
GP	Games played	GS	Games started	MPG	Minutes per game
FG%	Field-goal percentage	3P%	3-point field-goal percentage	FT%	Free-throw percentage
RPG	Rebounds per game	APG	Assists per game	SPG	Steals per game
BPG	Blocks per game	PPG	Points per game

=== Regular season ===
New York Knicks statistics
Player	GP	GS	MPG	FG%	3P%	FT%	RPG	APG	SPG	BPG	PPG
Earl Barron	7	6	33.1	.441		.759	11.0	1.1	.6	.6	11.7
Jonathan Bender	25	1	11.7	.400	.359	.923	2.1	.6	.1	.7	4.7
Wilson Chandler	65	64	35.7	.479	.267	.806	5.4	2.1	.7	.8	15.3
Eddy Curry	7	0	8.9	.381		.588	1.9	.0	.0	.1	3.7
Toney Douglas	56	12	19.4	.458	.389	.809	1.9	2.0	.8	.0	8.6
Chris Duhon	67	59	30.9	.373	.349	.716	2.7	5.6	.9	.0	7.4
Danilo Gallinari	81	74	33.9	.423	.381	.818	4.9	1.7	.9	.7	15.1
J. R. Giddens^{†}	11	0	12.7	.487	.000	.636	2.8	.6	.5	.1	4.1
Al Harrington	72	15	30.5	.435	.342	.757	5.6	1.5	.9	.4	17.7
Jordan Hill^{†}	24	0	10.5	.446	.000	.714	2.5	.3	.4	.4	4.0
Eddie House^{†}	18	0	20.6	.331	.250	1.000	2.2	2.1	.7	.0	6.4
Larry Hughes^{†}	31	14	26.5	.366	.289	.823	3.5	3.5	1.3	.4	9.6
Jared Jeffries^{†}	52	37	28.1	.443	.323	.645	4.3	1.6	1.0	1.1	5.5
Marcus Landry^{†}	17	0	6.4	.390	.346	.600	1.1	.0	.1	.1	2.6
David Lee	81	81	37.3	.545	.000	.812	11.7	3.6	1.0	.5	20.2
Tracy McGrady^{†}	24	24	26.1	.389	.242	.754	3.7	3.9	.6	.5	9.4
Darko Milicic^{†}	8	0	8.9	.471			2.3	.5	.5	.1	2.0
Nate Robinson^{†}	30	2	24.4	.452	.375	.778	2.4	3.7	.9	.2	13.2
Sergio Rodríguez^{†}	27	8	19.7	.491	.347	.806	1.4	3.4	.8	.1	7.4
Bill Walker^{†}	27	13	27.4	.518	.431	.787	3.1	1.4	.8	.1	11.9

- ^{†} Denotes player spent time with another team in the season. Stats reflect time with the Knicks only.

== Awards, records and milestones ==
=== Awards ===
==== All-Star ====
- David Lee was named to the Eastern Conference All-Star Team
- Nate Robinson won the NBA Slam Dunk Contest.
- Danilo Gallinari participated in the Three-Point Contest.

== Transactions ==
=== Trades ===
June 24, 2009	To New York Knicks Darko Miličić	To Memphis Grizzlies Quentin Richardson, Cash considerations

=== Free agents ===
==== Additions ====
Player	Signed	Former team
Warren Carter	September 11	BK Ventspils (Latvia)
Gabe Pruitt	September 11	Boston Celtics
Sun Yue	September 17	Los Angeles Lakers

==== Subtractions ====
Player	Waived
Warren Carter	October 7
Gabe Pruitt	October 7
Sun Yue	October 7
Ron Howard	October 7
Joe Crawford	October 22
Chris Hunter	October 22
