= Gabe Pruitt =

American basketball player (born 1986)

Personal information
- Born: April 19, 1986 (age 40) Los Angeles, California, U.S.
- Listed height: 6 ft 4 in (1.93 m)
- Listed weight: 200 lb (91 kg)

Career information
- High school: Centennial (Compton, California); Westchester (Los Angeles, California)
- College: USC (2004–2007)
- NBA draft: 2007: 2nd round, 32nd overall pick
- Drafted by: Boston Celtics
- Playing career: 2007–2018
- Position: Point guard / shooting guard
- Number: 13,34

Career history
- 2007–2009: Boston Celtics
- 2007–2008: →Utah Flash
- 2009–2010: Los Angeles D-Fenders
- 2010: Utah Flash
- 2010: Ironi Ashkelon
- 2011–2013: Sioux Falls Skyforce
- 2013: Maine Red Claws
- 2013–2014: Rethymno Aegean
- 2014: Keravnos
- 2014: Panionios
- 2017–2018: Santos San Luis
- 2018: Sukhbaatar Alians Tekh

Career highlights
- NBA champion (2008); First-team All-Pac-10 (2006); Pac-10 All-Freshman Team (2005); Fourth-team Parade All-American (2004)

Career NBA statistics
- Points: 125 (2.0 ppg)
- Rebounds: 51 (0.8 rpg)
- Assists: 52 (0.8 apg)
- Stats at NBA.com
- Stats at Basketball Reference

Gabriel Michael Pruitt (born April 19, 1986) is an American former professional basketball player. He played two seasons for the Boston Celtics of the National Basketball Association (NBA), winning an NBA championship with the team in 2008. He also played in the NBA D League, Greece, Israel, Cyprus, and Mexico from 2010 to 2018.

== High school ==
Pruitt and was born in Los Angeles, California and attended Westchester High School, where he averaged 22 points per game as a senior in 2004. He was a fourth-team Parade All-American selection, Los Angeles Times All-City and South Bay/Westside first team and South Bay Daily Breeze Player of the Year honors. He was listed as the No. 20 prep player in the country by Basketball Times after his senior year, and was considered among the top 20 prep guards by Athlon Sports and Insiders.com in his senior year in 2004.

== College career ==
=== 2004–2005 ===
Pruitt earned team MVP honors along with fellow freshman Nick Young. He led the Trojans in points (356), scoring average (12.3), three-point average (.450), assists (92), and steals (56) earning him selection to the All-Pac-10 freshman team. His three-point field-goal percentage set a school record and he hit at a .547 clip (41-of-75) in the latter half of the season. He was among the all-time Trojan top-10 freshmen in points (fifth) average (T-fourth), field goals (seventh), field-goals attempted (eighth), field-goal percentage (the ninth-best ever by a freshman guard), three-pointers (1st), three-pointers attempted (second), three-pointer percentage (first), free-throw percentage (ninth), assists (fifth) and steals (second). He scored in double digits in 20 of 29 of his games, including a season-high of 23 twice, both against Stanford at home on January 22 and at Stanford on February 27. In the home game v. Stanford, he made a season high of seven three-pointers out of 11 attempted. This tied him with Anthony Pendleton, who had achieved this feat on December 9, 1987. He had a season-best eight assists in his game v. San Diego on December 11. and a high of eight rebounds v. Arizona State on February 12.

=== 2005–2006 ===
Pruitt started 25 games for the USC and finished second on that team and fifth in the Pac-10 with a 16.9 scoring average, while snagging 4.0 rebounds and having 3.1 assists per game. He was named to the All-Pac-10 First Team along with teammate Nick Young; they had become the first pair of Trojans to make the team since Duane Cooper and Harold Miner in 1992. Additionally Pruitt was selected to the NABC District 15 first team. On December 3 v. BYU, he had his first career double-double, scoring 17 points with a career-high 10 rebounds. His next career high was made when he scored 36 points in a 71–69 victory at Loyola Marymount on December 10, which earned him Pac-10 Player of the Week honors. From the field, Pruitt was 13-19 (68.4 percent), including 5-for-10 from three-point range. He became the 12th Trojan to score 36 points or more in a game. He had 16 points (counting 5-for-8 from outside the arc), six rebounds and assists, and four steals in a victory over North Carolina on December 21. He sealed USC's win over Stanford on December 31 by making 10 of 12 free throw shots down the line, including 6–6 in the final 47 seconds of the 82–71 win at the Staples Center.

He scored 30 points on 11-for-18 shooting (5-11 from three-point range) in a near-victory against Arizona State on January 5 (at 66–65). Pruitt scored six three-pointers and made all of his 21 points in the second half of an 86–77 loss vs. Washington on the twelfth. He marked 30 points again on an 8–12 shooting (6 three-pointers made) in an 84–78 win on January 28. Pruitt became the ninth Trojan to score 30 or more points in three games or more in the same season and the first since Harold Miner in 1992 (who did this 11 times). He tallied a career-high seven steals and a game-high 25 points in a 77–70 win over Arizona on February 2. Then he missed several games from February 9 to February 25 after he suffered a tibial plateau fracture in his left knee. His return to action was on March 2, playing in USC's final three games. However, he only marked 29.3 percent of his shots (12-for-41). He ranked second in the Pac-10 in steals with 55 (2.2 per game). His 111 steals are among the tops of the Pac-10. Making 94 of his 117 (80.3 percent) free-throw attempts, he ranked tenth in the conference and earned the Joe Barbato Award for the best free-throw percentage on the Trojans at the team awards dinner.

During the end of the 2005–2006 season, Pruitt gained minor media attention after he was the victim of a catfishing scam in which a Cal student later revealed to be named Steven Kenyon pretended to be a female UCLA student named Victoria. Victoria messaged Pruitt on AIM and the two chatted flirtatiously and planned a date after Pruitt's game against Cal. During the game, several students in the student section for Cal having been in on the gig, chanted taunts at Pruitt. Phrases such as "Call Gabe" and "Victoria! Victoria!" were chanted by hundred of students in the audience. Kenyon later commented that the entire ordeal was to give Cal a competitive advantage by throwing Pruitt off his feet.

=== 2006–2007 ===
Since he was an efficient shooter, defender, and leader, Pruitt did fairly well as a sophomore for the Trojans. with 131 three-pointers, Pruitt holds the record for most three-pointers by a Trojan (in his first two seasons), ranking 10th all-time at USC.

Pruitt, who missed the first 13 games of the season while academically ineligible, finished third in scoring, averaging 12.5 points per game, while leading the team in assists with 113 and steals with 47 in 26 games. He also led USC in free throw shooting, hitting 80.0 percent, to win the Joe Barbato Award for the team's highest free throw percentage for his second consecutive season. Pruitt became the 32nd Trojan in history to score 1,000 points in his career, and ranks 27th all-time at USC in scoring with 1,102 points. He also stands in fourth place all-time at USC for three-pointers made with 179 while holding down the sixth spot in steals with 158. He was also selected to the honorable-mention all-pac-10 team.

Pruitt helped lead East Region five-seed USC to the round of Sweet Sixteen in the 2007 NCAA Tournament, where they fell to No. 1 North Carolina, 74–64. Pruitt scored in double figures in all three NCAA Tournament games against Arkansas, Kevin Durant-led Texas, and the Tar Heels, and had better than a 3:1 assist to turnover ratio (19 to 6).

On April 27, 2007, Pruitt announced that he registered for the 2007 NBA draft, following teammate and fellow junior Nick Young in declaring for the draft, whereas freshman teammate Taj Gibson declined to make himself eligible, and was eventually selected by the Boston Celtics in the 2nd round with the 32nd overall selection.

== NBA and D-League ==
=== 2007–2008 ===
Pruitt did not see significant playing time in his first NBA season. Being the 4th string point guard behind Rajon Rondo, Eddie House and Sam Cassell, he spent most of the season playing with the Celtics' D-League affiliate, the Utah Flash.

=== 2008–2009 ===
Pruitt played a small role on the Celtics, averaging under 8 minutes per game.

=== 2009–2010 ===
Pruitt was waived by the Celtics on July 31, 2009. He played with the New York Knicks during their 2009 training camp, but was waived on October 7, 2009. Pruitt then played for the Los Angeles D-Fenders and Utah Flash of the NBA Developmental League.

=== 2011–2012 ===
Pruitt started the 2011–12 season in the D-League with the Sioux Falls Skyforce. After appearing in just two games, he signed with the Orlando Magic in December 2011. On December 21, 2011, after two preseason games against the Miami Heat, he was waived, and returned to the Skyforce.

=== 2012–2013 ===
On February 26, 2013, Pruitt was traded to the Maine Red Claws, in exchange for James Mays. He left the Red Claws in late March.

== European career ==
On April 3, 2013, Pruitt signed with the Greek League club Rethymno Aegean.

== College statistics ==
Season	G	FG%	3P%	FT%	Reb.	RPG	Asst	Bl	St	Pts	PPG
2006–2007	26	41.6	35.0	80.0	73	2.8	4.3	0.3	1.8	324	12.5
2005–2006	25	40.5	38.0	80.3	101	4.0	3.1	0.3	2.2	422	16.9
2004–2005	29	48.8	45.0	70.3	73	2.5	3.2	0.1	1.9	356	12.3
Career	80	43.4	39.3	77.8	247	3.1	3.5	0.2	2.0	1102	13.8

Source: http://collegebasketball.rivals.com/bviewplayer.asp?Player=46729

== Rankings ==
- Pruitt was ranked #46 in Rivals Hoops 2004 top 150 players.
- Pruitt was ranked the #9 point guards in 2004 by Rivals

== NBA career statistics ==
Legend
GP	Games played	GS	Games started	MPG	Minutes per game
FG%	Field goal percentage	3P%	3-point field goal percentage	FT%	Free throw percentage
RPG	Rebounds per game	APG	Assists per game	SPG	Steals per game
BPG	Blocks per game	PPG	Points per game	**Bold**	Career high
†	Won an NBA championship

=== Regular season ===
Year	Team	GP	GS	MPG	FG%	3P%	FT%	RPG	APG	SPG	BPG	PPG
2007–08†	Boston	15	0	6.5	**.359**	.250	.500	.5	**.9**	**.3**	.0	**2.1**
2008–09	Boston	**47**	0	**7.8**	.307	**.292**	**.810**	**.9**	.8	**.3**	**.1**	2.0
Career		62	0	7.4	.321	.283	.783	.8	.8	.3	.0	2.0

=== Playoffs ===
Year	Team	GP	GS	MPG	FG%	3P%	FT%	RPG	APG	SPG	BPG	PPG
2009	Boston	4	0	2.8	.000	.000	.000	.0	.5	.0	.3	.0
Career		4	0	2.8	.000	.000	.000	.0	.5	.0	.3	.0
