= 2008–09 Boston Celtics season =

Season of National Basketball Association team the Boston Celtics

- Division champions
- Head coach: Doc Rivers
- President: Danny Ainge
- General manager: Danny Ainge
- Owners: Boston Basketball Partners L.L.C.
- Arena: TD Banknorth Garden

Results
- Record: 62–20 (.756)
- Place: Division: 1st (Atlantic); Conference: 2nd (Eastern)
- Playoff finish: Conference Semifinals (lost to Magic 3–4)
- Stats at Basketball Reference

Local media
- Television: CSN New England
- Radio: WEEI

The 2008–09 Boston Celtics season was the 63rd season for the franchise in the National Basketball Association (NBA). They started the season as the defending NBA champions, where they defeated the Los Angeles Lakers in six games, winning their seventeenth NBA championship, as well as marking their ninth series victory over the Lakers in the NBA Finals. The Celtics started the season 27–2, which surpassed a mark set by the 1966–67 Philadelphia 76ers for the best two-loss start in NBA history. This run also included a 19-game winning streak, which improved a Celtics franchise record set in 1981–82. However, the Celtics lost seven out of the following nine games, and eventually finished with a 62–20 record. The Celtics had the fifth best team offensive rating in the NBA.

The team's star power forward Kevin Garnett suffered a season-ending injury in February. Despite not having Garnett, they defeated the Chicago Bulls in the first round in seven games, However, they lost to the Orlando Magic in the conference semifinals in seven games, eliminating them from the playoffs. The Magic would go on to the NBA Finals, their second NBA Finals appearance, only to lose to last year's Finals runner-up, the Los Angeles Lakers in five games.

Until 2024, this was the last time that the Celtics won 60 or more games.

== Key dates ==
- June 26: The 2008 NBA draft took place in New York City.
- July 1: The free agency period started.
- October 8: The pre-season started with a game against the Philadelphia 76ers.
- October 28: The regular season started with a game against the Cleveland Cavaliers, which Boston won 90–85.
- December 11: Recorded the best season start in franchise history, starting at 21–2.
- December 23: Recorded the longest winning streak in franchise history at 19, and the best season start in NBA history with 27–2.

== Summary ==
=== NBA Draft 2008 ===
On June 26, the Celtics selected shooting guard J. R. Giddens with the 30th and center Semih Erden with the 60th overall picks in the 2008 NBA draft, and traded cash considerations in exchange for small forward Bill Walker, who had been selected by the Washington Wizards with the 47th overall pick. Giddens had worked out with the Celtics before the draft for three days, and received praises from head coach Doc Rivers, who thought he could fight for minutes on the team right away. He was already familiar with future teammates Leon Powe and Kendrick Perkins, who were his teammates at the 2003 McDonald's High School All-American Game. Walker was considered a lottery pick, but suffered the third knee injury in his career during a workout at the Golden State Warriors facility on June 15. However, he remained in the draft despite the injury, and was expected to have minor surgery in July that would keep him out for three to four weeks. Erden was not expected to join the roster this season, and was seen by general manager Danny Ainge as their first-round pick in 2009.

=== Free agency ===
The Celtics headed into the off-season with several free agents and tried to gather a group to repeat as the NBA Champions, with a key decision on unrestricted free agent James Posey, who, in a widely anticipated move, opted out of the second and final year of his contract with the Celtics on June 30, but stated that he wanted to return to the Celtics on a new contract. P.J. Brown, who made key contributions during the 2008 NBA Playoffs, was leaning towards retirement, and the status of restricted free agent Tony Allen remained uncertain after the first-round selection of J. R. Giddens, who was seen as a possible replacement. Later it was revealed that the Celtics did not extend a qualifying offer to Allen, making him an unrestricted free agent. The Celtics also hoped to keep unrestricted free agent Eddie House, and decisions were to be made on unrestricted free agents Sam Cassell and Scot Pollard.

The Celtics were interested in small forward Corey Maggette as a replacement for James Posey, but Maggette signed with the Golden State Warriors on a much higher contract than the Celtics were able to offer, which added to the urgency to re-sign Posey. On July 11, the Celtics addressed their need for a backup center by signing Patrick O'Bryant to a 2-year, $3 million contract, after he had an impressive workout with the team a week earlier, and consequently ruled out the return of Scot Pollard and P.J. Brown. Eventually, James Posey signed with the New Orleans Hornets on July 16, since the Celtics were reluctant to offer him more than a three-year deal at the mid-level exception. Compensating for the loss of Posey, the Celtics re-signed Tony Allen to a 2-year, $5 million contract, and were also able to re-sign Eddie House to a 2-year, $5.6 million contract, using the mid-level exception only on House.

On August 22, the Celtics signed small forward Darius Miles, who was forced to sit out the previous two seasons due to microfracture surgery on his right knee and thought to have a career-ending injury, to a non-guaranteed contract, and expected him to fight for a roster spot at training camp. He worked out twice with the team and impressed with his health and attitude, but would sit out the first ten games of the regular season for violating the league's substance abuse policy if he made the roster. This signing ultimately put the roster up to the league maximum of 15 players, of which 14 players had fully guaranteed contracts. On September 29, the first day of training camp, Sam Cassell re-signed with the team, which put the roster one player over the maximum. On October 20, Miles was waived, a move which finalized the roster for the start of the season. On February 27, Stephon Marbury signed with the Celtics. In the following season he was offered a one-year contract for the veteran's minimum for $1.3 million but declined the contract.

== Draft picks ==
Round	Pick	Player	Position	Nationality	College/Team
1	30	J. R. Giddens	SG	United States	New Mexico
2	60	Semih Erden	C	Turkey	Fenerbahçe Ülker

== Roster ==
2008–09 Boston Celtics roster
Players

Pos.	No.	Player	Height	Weight	DOB	From
SG	20	Ray Allen	6 ft 5 in (1.96 m)	205 lb (93 kg)	1975-07-20	Connecticut
SG	42	Tony Allen	6 ft 4 in (1.93 m)	213 lb (97 kg)	1982-01-11	Oklahoma State
F/C	11	Glen Davis	6 ft 9 in (2.06 m)	289 lb (131 kg)	1986-01-01	LSU
F/C	5	Kevin Garnett	6 ft 11 in (2.11 m)	253 lb (115 kg)	1976-05-19	Farragut Academy (IL)
G/F	4	J. R. Giddens	6 ft 5 in (1.96 m)	215 lb (98 kg)	1985-02-13	New Mexico
PG	50	Eddie House	6 ft 1 in (1.85 m)	175 lb (79 kg)	1978-04-15	Arizona State
PG	8	Stephon Marbury	6 ft 2 in (1.88 m)	205 lb (93 kg)	1977-02-20	Georgia Tech
C	7	Mikki Moore	7 ft 0 in (2.13 m)	225 lb (102 kg)	1975-04-11	Nebraska
C	43	Kendrick Perkins	6 ft 10 in (2.08 m)	280 lb (127 kg)	1984-11-10	Clifton J. Ozen HS (TX)
G/F	34	Paul Pierce	6 ft 7 in (2.01 m)	235 lb (107 kg)	1977-10-13	Kansas
PF	0	Leon Powe	6 ft 8 in (2.03 m)	240 lb (109 kg)	1984-01-22	California
SG	13	Gabe Pruitt	6 ft 4 in (1.93 m)	170 lb (77 kg)	1986-04-19	USC
PG	9	Rajon Rondo	6 ft 1 in (1.85 m)	171 lb (78 kg)	1986-02-22	Kentucky
F/C	44	Brian Scalabrine	6 ft 9 in (2.06 m)	235 lb (107 kg)	1978-03-18	USC
SF	12	Bill Walker	6 ft 6 in (1.98 m)	220 lb (100 kg)	1988-09-10	Kansas State

Coaches
Head coach
- Doc Rivers
Assistant(s)
- Kevin Eastman
- Armond Hill
- Mike Longabardi
- Clifford Ray
- Tom Thibodeau

Legend
- (DP) Unsigned draft pick
- (FA) Free agent
- (S) Suspended
- Injured

Roster
Updated: February 24, 2009

== Regular season ==
=== Standings ===
Atlantic Division	W	L	PCT	GB	Home	Road	Div
y-Boston Celtics	62	20	.756	—	35–6	27–14	15–1
x-Philadelphia 76ers	41	41	.500	21	24–17	17–24	6–10
New Jersey Nets	34	48	.415	28	19–22	15–26	8–8
Toronto Raptors	33	49	.402	29	18–23	15–26	6–10
New York Knicks	32	50	.390	30	20–21	12–29	5–11

#	Eastern Conference				
#	Team	W	L	PCT	GB
1	z-Cleveland Cavaliers	66	16	.805	—
2	y-Boston Celtics	62	20	.756	4
3	y-Orlando Magic	59	23	.720	7
4	x-Atlanta Hawks	47	35	.573	19
5	x-Miami Heat	43	39	.524	23
6	x-Philadelphia 76ers	41	41	.500	25
7	x-Chicago Bulls	41	41	.500	25
8	x-Detroit Pistons	39	43	.476	27
9	Indiana Pacers	36	46	.439	30
10	Charlotte Bobcats	35	47	.427	31
11	New Jersey Nets	34	48	.415	32
12	Milwaukee Bucks	34	48	.415	32
13	Toronto Raptors	33	49	.402	33
14	New York Knicks	32	50	.390	34
15	Washington Wizards	19	63	.232	47

=== Game log ===
2008–09 game log
Total: 62–20 (home: 35–6; road: 27–14)
October: 2–0 (home: 2–0; road: 0–0)

Game	Date	Team	Score	High points	High rebounds	High assists	Location Attendance	Record
1	October 28	Cleveland	W 90–85	Paul Pierce (27)	Kendrick Perkins (8)	Rajon Rondo (6)	TD Banknorth Garden; 18,624	1–0
2	October 31	Chicago	W 96–80	Kevin Garnett (18)	Kevin Garnett, Kendrick Perkins (10)	Rajon Rondo (6)	TD Banknorth Garden; 18,624	2–0

November: 14–2 (home: 7–1; road: 7–1)

Game	Date	Team	Score	High points	High rebounds	High assists	Location Attendance	Record
3	November 1	@ Indiana	L 79–95	Kevin Garnett (18)	Kevin Garnett (14)	Paul Pierce, Rajon Rondo (4)	Conseco Fieldhouse; 18,165	2–1
4	November 4	@ Houston	W 103–99	Ray Allen (29)	Kevin Garnett (11)	Rajon Rondo (7)	Toyota Center; 18,291	3–1
5	November 5	@ Oklahoma City	W 96–83	Paul Pierce (20)	Paul Pierce, Ray Allen, Kendrick Perkins (9)	Rajon Rondo (11)	Ford Center; 19,136	4–1
6	November 7	Milwaukee	W 101–89	Paul Pierce (18)	Paul Pierce (10)	Rajon Rondo (8)	TD Banknorth Garden; 18,624	5–1
7	November 9	@ Detroit	W 88–76	Tony Allen (23)	Kevin Garnett (12)	Rajon Rondo (5)	The Palace of Auburn Hills; 22,076	6–1
8	November 10	Toronto	W 94–87	Paul Pierce (36)	Kevin Garnett (10)	Paul Pierce (4)	TD Banknorth Garden; 18,624	7–1
9	November 12	Atlanta	W 103–102	Paul Pierce (34)	Kevin Garnett (12)	Rajon Rondo (10)	TD Banknorth Garden; 18,624	8–1
10	November 14	Denver	L 85–94	Ray Allen (26)	Kevin Garnett, Kendrick Perkins (9)	Rajon Rondo (7)	TD Banknorth Garden; 18,624	8–2
11	November 15	@ Milwaukee	W 102–97 (OT)	Paul Pierce (28)	Paul Pierce, Kevin Garnett (7)	Paul Pierce, Rajon Rondo (6)	Bradley Center; 17,952	9–2
12	November 18	New York	W 110–101	Paul Pierce (22)	Paul Pierce, Kendrick Perkins, Rajon Rondo (8)	Rajon Rondo (7)	TD Banknorth Garden; 18,624	10–2
13	November 20	Detroit	W 98–80	Rajon Rondo (18)	Kendrick Perkins (10)	Rajon Rondo (8)	TD Banknorth Garden; 18,624	11–2
14	November 21	@ Minnesota	W 95–78	Kevin Garnett (17)	Paul Pierce, Leon Powe (11)	Ray Allen (6)	Target Center; 19,107	12–2
15	November 23	@ Toronto	W 118–103	Ray Allen (21)	Kendrick Perkins (8)	Kevin Garnett (5)	Air Canada Centre; 19,800	13–2
16	November 26	Golden State	W 119–111	Ray Allen (25)	Kevin Garnett (13)	Rajon Rondo (7)	TD Banknorth Garden; 18,624	14–2
17	November 28	Philadelphia	W 102–78	Ray Allen (23)	Kendrick Perkins (7)	Rajon Rondo (12)	TD Banknorth Garden; 18,624	15–2
18	November 29	@ Charlotte	W 89–84	Paul Pierce (19)	Kendrick Perkins (12)	Rajon Rondo (9)	Time Warner Cable Arena; 19,177	16–2

December: 12–3 (home: 8–0; road: 4–3)

Game	Date	Team	Score	High points	High rebounds	High assists	Location Attendance	Record
19	December 1	Orlando	W 107–88	Paul Pierce (24)	Kendrick Perkins (13)	Rajon Rondo (12)	TD Banknorth Garden; 18,624	17–2
20	December 3	Indiana	W 114–96	Ray Allen (31)	Kevin Garnett (14)	Rajon Rondo (17)	TD Banknorth Garden; 18,624	18–2
21	December 5	Portland	W 93–78	Ray Allen (19)	Kendrick Perkins (12)	Rajon Rondo (7)	TD Banknorth Garden; 18,624	19–2
22	December 7	@ Indiana	W 122–117 (OT)	Ray Allen (35)	Kevin Garnett (20)	Paul Pierce (8)	Conseco Fieldhouse; 16,102	20–2
23	December 11	@ Washington	W 122–88	Ray Allen, Paul Pierce (22)	Kevin Garnett (12)	Paul Pierce (8)	Verizon Center; 20,173	21–2
24	December 12	New Orleans	W 94–82	Paul Pierce (28)	Kendrick Perkins (13)	Paul Pierce (6)	TD Banknorth Garden; 18,624	22–2
25	December 15	Utah	W 100–91	Rajon Rondo (25)	Kendrick Perkins (14)	Rajon Rondo (8)	TD Banknorth Garden; 18,624	23–2
26	December 17	@ Atlanta	W 88–85	Kevin Garnett, Paul Pierce (18)	Kendrick Perkins (10)	Rajon Rondo (7)	Philips Arena; 18,729	24–2
27	December 19	Chicago	W 126–108	Ray Allen (27)	Kendrick Perkins (8)	Rajon Rondo (15)	TD Banknorth Garden; 18,624	25–2
28	December 21	New York	W 124–105	Rajon Rondo (26)	Kendrick Perkins (12)	Kevin Garnett (8)	TD Banknorth Garden; 18,624	26–2
29	December 23	Philadelphia	W 110–91	Kevin Garnett, Rajon Rondo (18)	Kendrick Perkins (11)	Paul Pierce (7)	TD Banknorth Garden; 18,624	27–2
30	December 25	@ L. A. Lakers	L 83–92	Kevin Garnett (22)	Paul Pierce (10)	Rajon Rondo (12)	Staples Center; 18,997	27–3
31	December 26	@ Golden State	L 89–99	Paul Pierce (21)	Rajon Rondo (10)	Rajon Rondo (9)	Oracle Arena; 19,596	27–4
32	December 28	@ Sacramento	W 108–63	Kevin Garnett (21)	Kendrick Perkins (12)	Rajon Rondo (6)	ARCO Arena; 16,029	28–4
33	December 30	@ Portland	L 86–91	Paul Pierce (28)	Kevin Garnett (8)	Rajon Rondo (7)	Rose Garden; 20,651	28–5

January: 11–4 (home: 6–1; road: 5–3)

Game	Date	Team	Score	High points	High rebounds	High assists	Location Attendance	Record
34	January 2	Washington	W 108–83	Paul Pierce (26)	Kendrick Perkins (10)	Rajon Rondo (14)	TD Banknorth Garden; 18,624	29–5
35	January 4	@ New York	L 88–100	Paul Pierce (31)	Kevin Garnett (9)	Paul Pierce (4)	Madison Square Garden; 19,763	29–6
36	January 6	@ Charlotte	L 106–114 (OT)	Paul Pierce (28)	Kevin Garnett (13)	Rajon Rondo (6)	Time Warner Cable Arena; 17,112	29–7
37	January 7	Houston	L 85–89	Paul Pierce (26)	Kevin Garnett (8)	Ray Allen (6)	TD Banknorth Garden; 18,624	29–8
38	January 9	@ Cleveland	L 83–98	Kevin Garnett (18)	Kevin Garnett (15)	Rajon Rondo (13)	Quicken Loans Arena; 20,562	29–9
39	January 11	@ Toronto	W 94–88	Ray Allen (36)	Kevin Garnett, Glen Davis (11)	Rajon Rondo (11)	Air Canada Centre; 19,800	30–9
40	January 12	Toronto	W 115–109 (OT)	Paul Pierce (39)	Kevin Garnett (12)	Rajon Rondo (8)	TD Banknorth Garden; 18,624	31–9
41	January 14	New Jersey	W 118–86	Paul Pierce (22)	Kevin Garnett (9)	Rajon Rondo (12)	TD Banknorth Garden; 18,624	32–9
42	January 17	@ New Jersey	W 105–85	Ray Allen (25)	Kevin Garnett (10)	Rajon Rondo (14)	Izod Center; 17,578	33–9
43	January 19	Phoenix	W 104–87	Rajon Rondo (23)	Glen Davis (9)	Paul Pierce (8)	TD Banknorth Garden; 18,624	34–9
44	January 21	@ Miami	W 98–83	Ray Allen (27)	Kevin Garnett (13)	Rajon Rondo (10)	American Airlines Arena; 19,600	35–9
45	January 22	@ Orlando	W 90–80	Paul Pierce (27)	Paul Pierce (10)	Paul Pierce (4)	Amway Arena; 17,461	36–9
46	January 25	Dallas	W 124–100	Eddie House, Ray Allen, Kevin Garnett (23)	Rajon Rondo (7)	Rajon Rondo (14)	TD Banknorth Garden; 18,624	37–9
47	January 28	Sacramento	W 119–100	Eddie House (28)	Tony Allen, Kevin Garnett (8)	Rajon Rondo (9)	TD Banknorth Garden; 18,624	38–9
48	January 30	@ Detroit	W 86–78	Kevin Garnett (22)	Kevin Garnett (9)	Rajon Rondo (12)	The Palace of Auburn Hills; 22,076	39–9

February: 8–4 (home: 2–2; road: 6–2)

Game	Date	Team	Score	High points	High rebounds	High assists	Location Attendance	Record
49	February 1	Minnesota	W 109–101	Paul Pierce (36)	Kendrick Perkins (11)	Rajon Rondo (8)	TD Banknorth Garden; 18,624	40–9
50	February 3	@ Philadelphia	W 100–99	Paul Pierce (29)	Glen Davis (11)	Rajon Rondo (8)	Wachovia Center; 16,831	41–9
51	February 5	L. A. Lakers	L 109–110 (OT)	Ray Allen (22)	Kendrick Perkins (9)	Rajon Rondo (12)	TD Banknorth Garden; 18,624	41–10
52	February 6	@ New York	W 110–100	Paul Pierce (26)	Kevin Garnett (11)	Rajon Rondo (7)	Madison Square Garden; 19,763	42–10
53	February 8	San Antonio	L 99–105	Kevin Garnett (26)	Kevin Garnett (12)	Rajon Rondo (16)	TD Banknorth Garden; 18,624	42–11
54	February 11	@ New Orleans	W 89–77	Paul Pierce (30)	Kevin Garnett (10)	Rajon Rondo (11)	New Orleans Arena; 18,080	43–11
55	February 12	@ Dallas	W 99–92	Paul Pierce (31)	Rajon Rondo (15)	Rajon Rondo (14)	American Airlines Center; 20,285	44–11
All-Star Break
56	February 19	@ Utah	L 85–90	Paul Pierce (20)	Kendrick Perkins (11)	Rajon Rondo (7)	EnergySolutions Arena; 19,911	44–12
57	February 22	@ Phoenix	W 128–108	Rajon Rondo (32)	Eddie House, Rajon Rondo, Paul Pierce, Kendrick Perkins, Leon Powe (6)	Rajon Rondo (10)	US Airways Center; 18,422	45–12
58	February 23	@ Denver	W 114–76	Ray Allen (26)	Rajon Rondo (8)	Rajon Rondo (8)	Pepsi Center; 19,784	46–12
59	February 25	@ L. A. Clippers	L 91–93	Paul Pierce (20)	Kendrick Perkins, Leon Powe (9)	Ray Allen (6)	Staples Center; 18,609	46–13
60	February 27	Indiana	W 104–99	Ray Allen (30)	Kendrick Perkins (11)	Rajon Rondo (17)	TD Banknorth Garden; 18,624	47–13

March: 9–6 (home: 5–2; road: 4–4)

Game	Date	Team	Score	High points	High rebounds	High assists	Location Attendance	Record
61	March 1	Detroit	L 95–105	Paul Pierce (26)	Glen Davis, Rajon Rondo, Paul Pierce, Kendrick Perkins (6)	Rajon Rondo (6)	TD Banknorth Garden; 18,624	47–14
62	March 4	@ New Jersey	W 115–111	Paul Pierce (31)	Kendrick Perkins (13)	Paul Pierce, Rajon Rondo (5)	Izod Center; 15,791	48–14
63	March 6	Cleveland	W 105–94	Paul Pierce (29)	Leon Powe (11)	Rajon Rondo (10)	TD Banknorth Garden; 18,624	49–14
64	March 8	Orlando	L 79–86	Ray Allen (32)	Ray Allen (9)	Paul Pierce (3)	TD Banknorth Garden; 18,624	49–15
65	March 11	@ Miami	L 99–107	Ray Allen (27)	Leon Powe (13)	Stephon Marbury (4)	American Airlines Arena; 19,600	49–16
66	March 13	Memphis	W 102–92	Leon Powe (30)	Leon Powe (11)	Rajon Rondo (8)	TD Banknorth Garden; 18,624	50–16
67	March 15	@ Milwaukee	L 77–86	Kendrick Perkins (26)	Kendrick Perkins (12)	Rajon Rondo (8)	Bradley Center; 18,134	50–17
68	March 17	@ Chicago	L 121–127	Paul Pierce (37)	Kendrick Perkins, Mikki Moore (10)	Rajon Rondo (10)	United Center; 22,107	50–18
69	March 18	Miami	W 112–108 (OT)	Paul Pierce (36)	Paul Pierce (11)	Rajon Rondo (10)	TD Banknorth Garden; 18,624	51–18
70	March 20	@ San Antonio	W 80–77	Ray Allen (19)	Paul Pierce (12)	Rajon Rondo (12)	AT&T Center; 18,797	52–18
71	March 21	@ Memphis	W 105–87	Glen Davis (24)	Rajon Rondo (7)	Rajon Rondo (10)	FedExForum; 18,119	53–18
72	March 23	L. A. Clippers	W 90–77	Ray Allen (20)	Kendrick Perkins (13)	Rajon Rondo (7)	TD Banknorth Garden; 18,624	54–18
73	March 25	@ Orlando	L 82–84	Paul Pierce (26)	Kendrick Perkins (11)	Ray Allen, Rajon Rondo (5)	Amway Arena; 17,461	54–19
74	March 27	@ Atlanta	W 99–93	Ray Allen (22)	Glen Davis (12)	Paul Pierce, Rajon Rondo (5)	Philips Arena; 20,054	55–19
75	March 29	Oklahoma City	W 103–84	Paul Pierce (27)	Mikki Moore (11)	Rajon Rondo (12)	TD Banknorth Garden; 18,624	56–19

April: 6–1 (home: 5–0; road: 1–1)

Game	Date	Team	Score	High points	High rebounds	High assists	Location Attendance	Record
76	April 1	Charlotte	W 111–109 (2OT)	Paul Pierce (32)	Kendrick Perkins (12)	Rajon Rondo (9)	TD Banknorth Garden; 18,624	57–19
77	April 3	Atlanta	W 104–92	Paul Pierce (21)	Kendrick Perkins (10)	Rajon Rondo (6)	TD Banknorth Garden; 18,624	58–19
78	April 8	New Jersey	W 106–104	Rajon Rondo (31)	Rajon Rondo, Kendrick Perkins, Mikki Moore (9)	Rajon Rondo, Stephon Marbury (5)	TD Banknorth Garden; 18,624	59–19
79	April 10	Miami	W 105–98	Paul Pierce (28)	Rajon Rondo (10)	Rajon Rondo (12)	TD Banknorth Garden; 18,624	60–19
80	April 12	@ Cleveland	L 76–107	Paul Pierce (14)	Kendrick Perkins (6)	Rajon Rondo (6)	Quicken Loans Arena; 20,562	60–20
81	April 14	@ Philadelphia	W 100–98	Paul Pierce (31)	Kendrick Perkins (12)	Tony Allen, Stephon Marbury (5)	Wachovia Center; 17,752	61–20
82	April 15	Washington	W 115–107	Glen Davis (21)	Leon Powe (13)	Stephon Marbury (8)	TD Banknorth Garden; 18,624	62–20

2008–09 season schedule

== Playoffs ==
=== Game log ===
2009 playoff game log
First Round: 4–3 (home: 3–1; road: 1–2)

Game	Date	Team	Score	High points	High rebounds	High assists	Location Attendance	Record
1	April 18	Chicago	L 103–105 (OT)	Rajon Rondo (29)	Rajon Rondo (9)	Rajon Rondo (7)	TD Banknorth Garden; 18,624	0–1
2	April 20	Chicago	W 118–115	Ray Allen (30)	Rajon Rondo, Kendrick Perkins (12)	Rajon Rondo (16)	TD Banknorth Garden; 18,624	1–1
3	April 23	@ Chicago	W 107–86	Paul Pierce (24)	Rajon Rondo (11)	Glen Davis, Stephon Marbury (6)	United Center; 23,072	2–1
4	April 26	@ Chicago	L 118–121 (2OT)	Paul Pierce (29)	Glen Davis (12)	Rajon Rondo (11)	United Center; 23,067	2–2
5	April 28	Chicago	W 106–104 (OT)	Rajon Rondo (28)	Kendrick Perkins (19)	Rajon Rondo (16)	TD Banknorth Garden; 18,624	3–2
6	April 30	@ Chicago	L 127–128 (3OT)	Ray Allen (51)	Kendrick Perkins (13)	Rajon Rondo (19)	United Center; 23,430	3–3
7	May 2	Chicago	W 109–99	Ray Allen (23)	Kendrick Perkins (13)	Rajon Rondo (11)	TD Banknorth Garden; 18,624	4–3

Conference Semifinals : 3–4 (home: 2–2; road: 1–2)

Game	Date	Team	Score	High points	High rebounds	High assists	Location Attendance	Record
1	May 4	Orlando	L 90–95	Paul Pierce (23)	Kendrick Perkins (16)	Rajon Rondo (8)	TD Banknorth Garden; 18,624	0–1
2	May 6	Orlando	W 112–94	Eddie House (31)	Rajon Rondo (11)	Rajon Rondo (18)	TD Banknorth Garden; 18,624	1–1
3	May 8	@ Orlando	L 96–117	Paul Pierce (27)	Kendrick Perkins (7)	Paul Pierce, Rajon Rondo (6)	Amway Arena; 17,461	1–2
4	May 10	@ Orlando	W 95–94	Paul Pierce (27)	Rajon Rondo (14)	Ray Allen (4)	Amway Arena; 17,461	2–2
5	May 12	Orlando	W 92–88	Glen Davis (22)	Kendrick Perkins (11)	Paul Pierce (8)	TD Banknorth Garden; 18,624	3–2
6	May 14	@ Orlando	L 75–83	Rajon Rondo (19)	Rajon Rondo (16)	Rajon Rondo (6)	Amway Arena; 17,461	3–3
7	May 17	Orlando	L 82–101	Ray Allen (23)	Kendrick Perkins (15)	Rajon Rondo (10)	TD Banknorth Garden; 18,624	3–4

2009 playoff schedule

== Player statistics ==
Legend
GP	Games played	GS	Games started	MPG	Minutes per game
FG%	Field-goal percentage	3P%	3-point field-goal percentage	FT%	Free-throw percentage
RPG	Rebounds per game	APG	Assists per game	SPG	Steals per game
BPG	Blocks per game	PPG	Points per game	Source:

=== Regular season ===
Boston Celtics statistics
Player	GP	GS	MPG	FG%	3P%	FT%	RPG	APG	SPG	BPG	PPG
Ray Allen	79	79	36.4	.480	.409	.952	3.5	2.8	0.87	0.16	18.2
Tony Allen	46	2	19.3	.482	.222	.725	2.3	1.4	1.17	0.50	7.8
Glen Davis	76	16	21.5	.442	.400	.730	4.0	0.9	0.70	0.25	7.0
Kevin Garnett	57	57	31.1	.531	.250	.841	8.5	2.5	1.11	1.19	15.8
J. R. Giddens	6	0	1.3	.667	.000	.000	0.5	0.0	0.17	0.00	0.7
Eddie House	81	0	18.3	.445	.444	.792	1.9	1.1	0.75	0.09	8.5
Stephon Marbury	23	4	18.0	.342	.240	.462	1.2	3.3	0.43	0.13	3.8
Mikki Moore*	24	0	19.0	.600	.000	.737	4.4	1.0	0.17	0.21	4.8
Patrick O'Bryant*	26	0	4.2	.516	.000	.667	1.3	0.3	0.12	0.31	1.5
Kendrick Perkins	76	76	29.6	.577	.000	.600	8.1	1.3	0.29	1.97	8.5
Paul Pierce	81	81	37.5	.457	.391	.830	5.6	3.6	0.99	0.33	20.5
Leon Powe	70	7	17.5	.524	.000	.689	4.9	0.7	0.34	0.54	7.7
Gabe Pruitt	47	0	7.8	.307	.292	.810	0.9	0.8	0.32	0.06	2.0
Rajon Rondo	80	80	33.0	.505	.313	.642	5.2	8.2	1.86	0.14	11.9
Brian Scalabrine	39	8	12.9	.421	.393	.889	1.3	0.5	0.18	0.26	3.5
Bill Walker	29	0	7.4	.621	.000	.696	1.0	0.4	0.21	0.07	3.0

*Statistics with the Boston Celtics

=== Playoffs ===
Boston Celtics statistics
Player	GP	GS	MPG	FG%	3P%	FT%	RPG	APG	SPG	BPG	PPG
Ray Allen	14	14	40.4	.403	.350	.948	3.9	2.6	1.07	0.36	18.3
Tony Allen	10	0	6.0	.500	.000	1.000	0.9	0.3	0.20	0.00	0.9
Glen Davis	14	14	36.4	.491	.000	.710	5.6	1.8	1.29	0.57	15.8
Eddie House	14	0	16.6	.519	.486	.909	1.4	0.9	0.79	0.00	7.7
Stephon Marbury	14	0	11.9	.303	.250	1.000	0.9	1.8	0.07	0.00	3.7
Mikki Moore	10	0	6.6	.500	.000	.833	1.5	0.4	0.20	0.50	1.5
Kendrick Perkins	14	14	36.6	.575	.000	.667	11.6	1.4	0.43	2.64	11.9
Paul Pierce	14	14	39.7	.430	.333	.842	5.8	3.1	1.07	0.36	21.0
Leon Powe	2	0	12.0	.429	.000	.667	4.5	0.0	0.00	0.00	5.0
Gabe Pruitt	4	0	2.8	.000	.000	.000	0.0	0.5	0.00	0.25	0.0
Rajon Rondo	14	14	41.2	.417	.250	.657	9.7	9.8	2.50	0.21	16.9
Brian Scalabrine	12	0	20.5	.423	.448	1.000	2.2	1.0	0.17	0.42	5.1
Bill Walker	4	0	2.5	.000	.000	1.000	0.0	0.0	0.50	0.00	0.5

=== Salaries ===
Player	Salary
Kevin Garnett	$24,751,934
Ray Allen	$18,388,430
Paul Pierce	$18,077,903
Kendrick Perkins	$4,578,880
Brian Scalabrine	$3,206,897
Eddie House	$2,650,000
Tony Allen	$2,500,000
Rajon Rondo	$1,315,080
J.R. Giddens	$957,120
Leon Powe	$797,581
Glen Davis	$711,517
Gabe Pruitt	$711,517
Bill Walker	$542,114

== Awards, records and milestones ==
=== Awards ===
==== Week/Month ====
- Head coach Doc Rivers was named Eastern Conference Coach of the Month for games played in October and November.

==== All-Star ====
- Ray Allen was selected to his 9th NBA All–Star Game
- Paul Pierce was selected to his 7th NBA All–Star Game
- Kevin Garnett was selected as a starter to his 12th NBA All–Star Game

=== Records ===
- On February 22, Ray Allen broke the team record for consecutive free-throws made with 72, eclipsing the previous mark of 71 by Larry Bird.
- With 7 blocks against the Milwaukee Bucks on November 7, Kendrick Perkins had the most blocks in a game by a Celtics player since Kevin McHale had 8 on January 9, 1987.
- With 22 points in the fourth quarter against the Toronto Raptors on November 10, Paul Pierce had the most points in a quarter by a Celtics player since Todd Day had 24 in 1995.
- Head coach Doc Rivers became the third coach in NBA history to win the Coach of the Month award for three straight months, joining Flip Saunders (2005–06) and Larry Brown (2002–03).
- Rajon Rondo had the first triple-double by a Celtics player since Paul Pierce accomplished it on February 2, 2005, in a win against the Indiana Pacers on December 3.
- With 19 straight wins, the Celtics recorded the longest winning streak in franchise history with a win against the Philadelphia 76ers on December 23, breaking the previous record of 18 straight wins held by the 1981–82 Celtics, and matched the fourth longest winning streak in NBA history.
- With a 27–2 season start, the Celtics were off to the best opening in franchise history and NBA history.
- The Celtics matched their 6th biggest win in franchise history with a 108–63 blowout victory over the Sacramento Kings on December 28, 2008.
- The Celtics lost four games in a row for the first time since acquiring Ray Allen and Kevin Garnett.
- The Celtics recorded the most points in overtime (22) in franchise history, breaking the previous record of 21 set on January 2, 1963 against the Golden State Warriors.

=== Milestones ===
- Kevin Garnett became the youngest player (32 years, 165 days) in NBA history to reach 1,000 career games by passing Shawn Kemp (33 years, 24 days) against the Chicago Bulls on October 31.
- Paul Pierce moved up to 2nd in made free throws in Celtics history by passing Bob Cousy with a free-throw in the second quarter against the Toronto Raptors on November 10.
- Paul Pierce moved up to 4th on Boston's all-time scoring list by passing Kevin McHale with a layup in the second quarter against the Indiana Pacers on December 7.
- Kevin Garnett moved up to 26th in points in NBA history by passing Walt Bellamy with a jumper in the first quarter against the Houston Rockets on January 7.
- Kevin Garnett passed 21,000 points for his career with a field goal in the fourth quarter against the Toronto Raptors on January 12.\
- Rajon Rondo completed his first career triple-double December 3, 2008 with 16 points, 13 rebounds, and 17 assists. He followed up with his second career triple-double February 12, 2009 with 19 points, 15 rebounds (career high), and 14 assists.

== Injuries and surgeries ==
- July 2: Kendrick Perkins underwent surgery on his left strained shoulder which he injured during the 2008 NBA Finals.
- July 2: Bill Walker underwent surgery to repair a torn meniscus in his right knee which he suffered during a workout at the Golden State Warriors facility prior to the 2008 NBA draft on June 15, 2008.
- July 11: Paul Pierce had an MRI on his right knee which showed no significant problem. He suffered the injury during Game 1 of the 2008 NBA Finals, which was later diagnosed as a sprained MCL and a bone bruise.

== Transactions ==
=== Trades ===
June 26, 2008	To Boston Celtics The 47th pick in the 2008 NBA draft (Bill Walker)	To Washington Wizards Cash considerations

February 17, 2009	To Boston Celtics Conditional 2nd-round draft pick and cash considerations	To Los Angeles Clippers Sam Cassell

February 19, 2009	To Boston Celtics Conditional 2nd-round draft pick from Sacramento	To Portland Trail Blazers Patrick O'Bryant

=== Free agents ===
==== Additions ====
Player	Signed	Former team
Patrick O'Bryant	July 16	Portland Trail Blazers
Tony Allen	July 23	Memphis Grizzlies
Eddie House	July 23	Los Angeles Clippers
Darius Miles	August 22	Indiana Pacers
Sam Cassell	September 29	Los Angeles Clippers
Mikki Moore	February 24	Phoenix Suns
Stephon Marbury	February 27	New York Knicks

==== Departures ====
Player	Left	New team
P.J. Brown	July 1	New Orleans Hornets
Scot Pollard	July 1	Detroit Pistons
James Posey	July 23	New Orleans Hornets
Darius Miles	October 20	Indiana Pacers
Sam Cassell	February 17	Los Angeles Clippers
Patrick O'Bryant	February 19	Portland Trail Blazers
