= Marcus Landry =

American basketball player (born 1985)

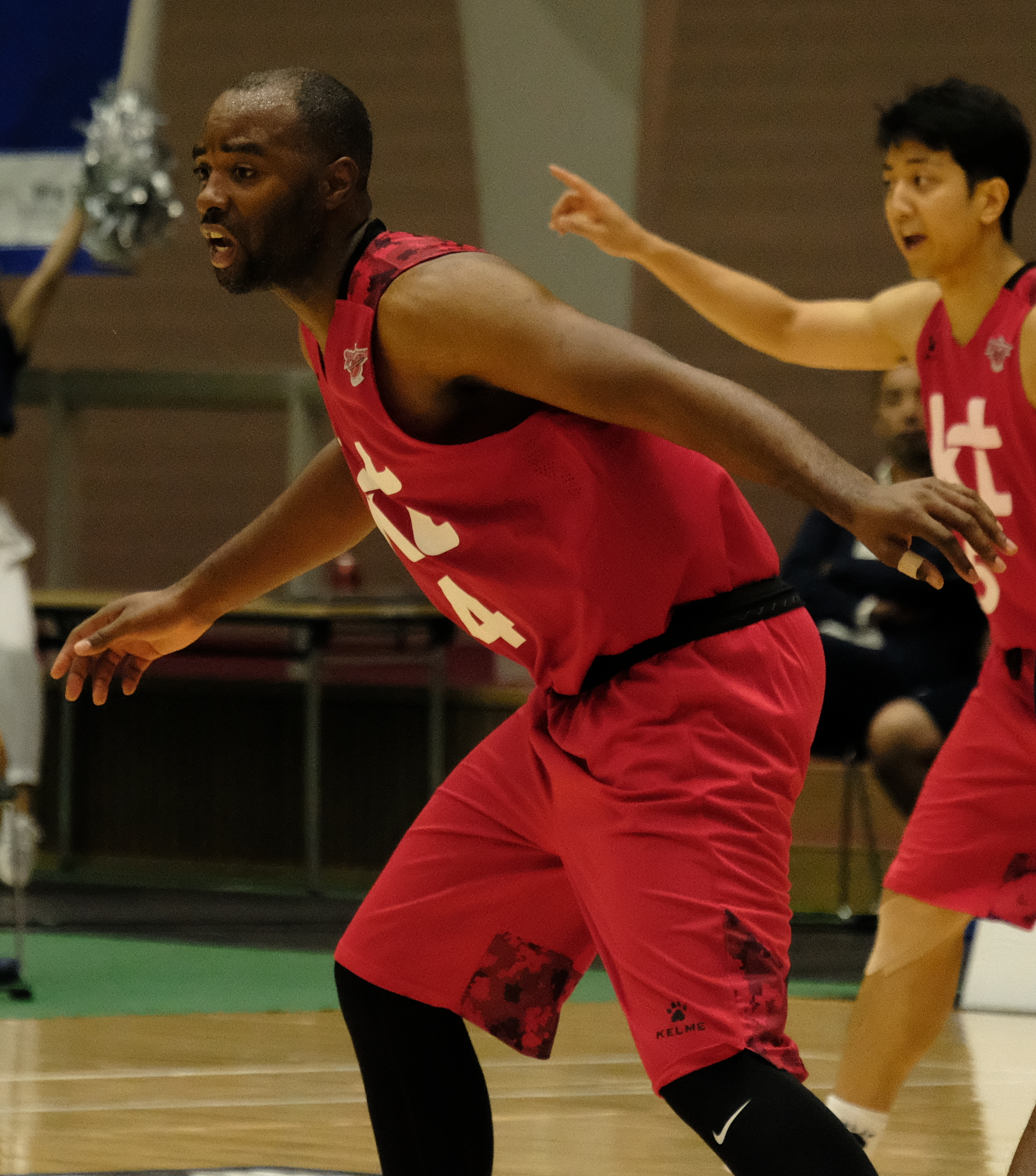

Personal information
- Born: November 1, 1985 (age 40) Milwaukee, Wisconsin, U.S.
- Listed height: 6 ft 7 in (2.01 m)
- Listed weight: 230 lb (104 kg)

Career information
- High school: Vincent (Milwaukee, Wisconsin)
- College: Wisconsin (2005–2009)
- NBA draft: 2009: undrafted
- Playing career: 2009–2019
- Position: Small forward
- Number: 11, 12

Career history
- 2009–2010: New York Knicks
- 2010: Boston Celtics
- 2010: →Maine Red Claws
- 2010–2011: Reno Bighorns
- 2011: Maratonistas de Coamo
- 2011: Manresa
- 2011–2012: Shanghai Sharks
- 2012: Bucaneros de La Guaira
- 2012–2013: Reno Bighorns
- 2013–2014: Sevilla
- 2014–2015: Zaragoza
- 2015–2016: San Sebastián Gipuzkoa
- 2016–2018: Brescia Leonessa
- 2018–2019: Busan KT Sonicboom
- 2019: Goyang Orions

Career highlights
- KBL All-Star (2019); LBA Most Valuable Player (2017); LBA Top Scorer (2017); NBA D-League All-Star (2013); NBA D-League Three-Point Shootout champion (2013); 2× Second-team All-Big Ten – Coaches (2008, 2009); 2× Third-team All-Big Ten – Media (2008, 2009); Big Ten tournament MOP (2008)
- Stats at NBA.com
- Stats at Basketball Reference

Marcus Landry (born November 1, 1985) is an American former professional basketball player who played in the National Basketball Association (NBA) and other leagues. Landry attended Vincent High School in Milwaukee, Wisconsin and played college basketball at the University of Wisconsin from 2005 to 2009.

== High school career ==
Landry attended Harold S. Vincent High School where he averaged 16.1 points, 5.9 rebounds and shot 59 percent from the field as a senior, leading his team to the Division I state title game and earning him a unanimous first-team all-state selection by the Associated Press.

== College career ==
After graduating from high school, Landry attended the University of Wisconsin-Madison. He became the 33rd player in Wisconsin history to reach the 1,000-point plateau and finished his career 25th on the school's all-time scoring list with 1,114 career points and eighth in Badgers annals with 185 offensive rebounds. With 99 career blocked shots, Landry also finished fifth in Wisconsin history and was also the 18th player in the school's history with at least 1,000 points and 500 rebounds. Landry appeared in 105 straight games and started the final 75 games of his career, being part of 100 wins during his collegiate career. He had 45 career double-digit scoring games. Landry helped lead the Badgers to a 2008 Big Ten men's basketball tournament championship, being named Big Ten tournament Most Outstanding Player.

== Professional career ==
After going undrafted in the 2009 NBA draft, Landry was signed by the New York Knicks in September 2009.

He was traded to the Boston Celtics along with Nate Robinson for Eddie House, Bill Walker, and J. R. Giddens on February 18, 2010. The Celtics assigned Landry to the Maine Red Claws on March 6, 2010.

In September 2010, he signed with the Sacramento Kings, joining his brother Carl. However, he was released on October 15. He was then acquired by the Kings' NBA D-League affiliate, the Reno Bighorns for the 2010–11 season.

In July 2011, he signed a one-year deal with BCM Gravelines in France. He was released soon afterwards and signed a 6-week contract with Bàsquet Manresa. On December 13, 2011, he signed with the Phoenix Suns but he was waived before the start of the 2011–12 season.

In July 2012, Landry signed with the Shanghai Sharks. In November 2012, he was acquired by the Reno Bighorns of the NBA Development League and represented them in the 2013 D-League Showcase Three Point Shootout, finishing in second place.

On February 4, 2013, Landry was named to the Futures All-Star roster for the 2013 NBA D-League All-Star Game. and on February 16, Landry won the NBA Developmental League Three Point Shootout. On March 12, it was announced that Landry had suffered a season ending knee injury and was placed on the inactive list.

Following a 2013 NBA Summer League stint, Landry was signed by the Los Angeles Lakers in September 2013, but was waived on October 25.

On December 16, 2013, Landry was re-acquired by the Reno Bighorns. On December 20, his contract was bought out by the Bighorns after just one game. On December 20, 2013, he signed with Cajasol Sevilla.

On August 2, 2014, Landry signed with CAI Zaragoza of the Liga ACB. In 34 league games for Zaragoza in 2014–15, he averaged 10.4 points, 3.8 rebounds and 1.3 assists per game.

On August 17, 2015, Landry signed with the Milwaukee Bucks. He was waived by the Bucks on October 21, 2015, after appearing in four preseason games. On December 20, he returned to the Liga ACB, this time with RETAbet.es GBC.

On August 3, 2016, Landry signed with Basket Brescia Leonessa of Italy for the 2016–17 season. Landry was named the Lega Basket Serie A MVP of the 2016–17 season, after averaging a league-high 19.6 points per game.

On September 19, 2019, Landry signed with Goyang Orions.

== Career statistics ==
Legend
GP	Games played	GS	Games started	MPG	Minutes per game
FG%	Field goal percentage	3P%	3-point field goal percentage	FT%	Free throw percentage
RPG	Rebounds per game	APG	Assists per game	SPG	Steals per game
BPG	Blocks per game	PPG	Points per game	**Bold**	Career high

=== NBA ===
==== Regular season ====
Year	Team	GP	GS	MPG	FG%	3P%	FT%	RPG	APG	SPG	BPG	PPG
2009–10	New York	**17**	0	**6.4**	**.390**	**.346**	**.600**	**1.1**	.0	**.1**	**.1**	**2.6**
2009–10	Boston	1	0	3.0	.000	.000	—	.0	.0	.0	.0	.0
Career		18	0	6.2	.372	.321	.600	1.1	.0	.1	.1	2.4

== Personal life ==
Landry is the son of Mark and Anita and the younger brother of Carl Landry, who played in the NBA, and also has a younger sister Shenita Lasha, who is a professional basketball player. His wife, Efueko, played basketball at Marquette and has three children: a son, Marcus Jr., and two daughters, Mariah and Makaylah.
