= Henry Walker (basketball) =

American basketball player (born 1987)

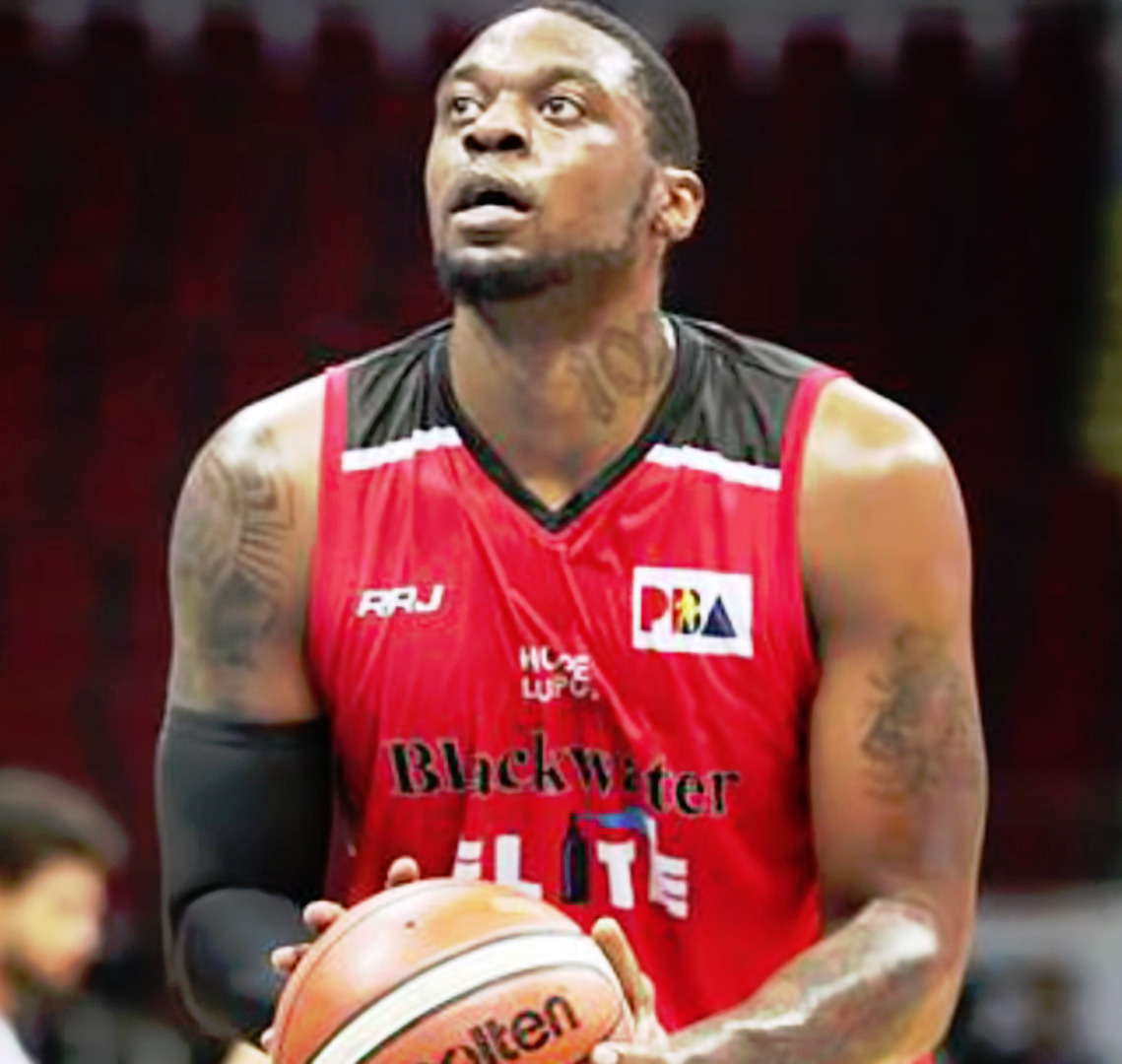

Personal information
- Born: October 9, 1987 (age 38) Huntington, West Virginia, U.S.
- Listed height: 6 ft 6 in (1.98 m)
- Listed weight: 220 lb (100 kg)

Career information
- High school: Rose Hill Christian (Ashland, Kentucky); North College Hill (North College Hill, Ohio)
- College: Kansas State (2006–2008)
- NBA draft: 2008: 2nd round, 47th overall pick
- Drafted by: Washington Wizards
- Playing career: 2008–2023
- Position: Small forward / shooting guard

Career history
- 2008–2010: Boston Celtics
- 2008–2009: →Utah Flash
- 2009: →Maine Red Claws
- 2010–2012: New York Knicks
- 2013: Austin Toros
- 2013: Trotamundos de Carabobo
- 2013–2014: Sioux Falls Skyforce
- 2014: Alaska Aces
- 2014–2015: Sioux Falls Skyforce
- 2015: Miami Heat
- 2015–2016: Cedevita
- 2016: NLEX Road Warriors
- 2016–2017: Sioux Falls Skyforce
- 2017: Blackwater Elite
- 2018: Galatasaray
- 2018: Defensor Sporting
- 2018: Blackwater Elite
- 2019–2020: Shiga Lakestars
- 2021: Club La Cancha
- 2021–2022: Rain or Shine Elasto Painters
- 2023: Gladiadores de Anzoátegui

Career highlights
- Croatian League champion (2016); Croatian Cup winner (2016); Third-team All-Big 12 (2008); Second-team Parade All-American (2006)
- Stats at NBA.com
- Stats at Basketball Reference

William Henry Walker (born October 9, 1987) is an American former professional basketball player. Previously known as Bill Walker, the 6-foot-6-inch-tall (1.98 m) player was selected out of Kansas State University by the Washington Wizards with the 47th overall pick in the second round of the 2008 NBA draft and traded shortly thereafter to the Boston Celtics in exchange for cash considerations.

== High school career ==
Walker was a three-year starter at North College Hill High School in North College Hill, Ohio, where he was a consensus Top 10 high school recruit and a teammate of future NBA lottery pick O. J. Mayo. His achievements include:

- 2006 Second-team Parade All-American
- 2006 USA Today All-USA High School Boys' Basketball All-Junior Team
- 2006 EA Sports High School Boys' Basketball First Team
- Ohio High School Basketball Coaches Association All-State First Team
- Cincinnati Enquirer All-State First Team

As a sophomore and junior in 2005 and 2006, Walker helped North College Hill to back-to-back Ohio Division III state titles and was named the Most Valuable Player of the 2006 State Tournament. In 2006, North College Hill finished third in the USA Today Super 25 High School rankings, with Walker averaging 21.7 points and 10.1 rebounds per game. He was selected the USA Today National Player of the Week on March 27, 2006. In the fall of 2006, Walker graduated early after it was ruled that he had used all of his high school athletics eligibility the previous year.

Walker also helped the USA White team to a 5–0 record at the 2005 USA Youth Development Festival in San Diego, California, where he played alongside Ohio State freshman Greg Oden and Kansas freshman Darrell Arthur. He was the only three-time Most Valuable Player at the Reebok ABCD Camp in Teaneck, New Jersey.

== College career ==
After receiving interest from many NCAA teams, including Cincinnati, Connecticut, Illinois, Syracuse, Southern California and Texas, Walker enrolled at Kansas State University as a part-time student in order to be eligible to play on December 16, 2006, the start of the second semester. He had an immediate impact on the team, averaging 11.3 points and 4.5 rebounds per game in his first six games. However, he ruptured the anterior cruciate ligament (ACL) in his left knee early in a game against Texas A&M on January 6, 2007, which required surgery and abruptly ended his freshman season. This was the second time he suffered this type of injury, going through surgery and rehab in his right knee in 2003.

In the 2007–08 season, Walker averaged 16.1 points and 6.3 rebounds in 31 games. He tied his career-high with 31 points in a 92–86 loss at Baylor on February 23, 2008, and combined with teammate Michael Beasley to score 75 of the Wildcats' 86 points in that game. On April 14, 2008, Walker announced along with Beasley that he would enter the 2008 NBA draft and thus forgo his last three years of eligibility.

== Professional career ==
=== Boston Celtics (2008–2010) ===
Many considered Walker a lottery pick, but he suffered the third knee injury in his career during a workout at the Golden State Warriors facility on June 15, 2008. He remained in the draft despite the injury, and was selected on June 26, 2008, by the Washington Wizards with the 47th overall pick in the 2008 NBA draft, but was subsequently traded to the Boston Celtics for cash considerations after visiting the Celtics three days earlier. He was expected to have minor surgery in July that would keep him out for three to four weeks.

In November 2008, Walker was sent to the Celtics' NBA Development League affiliate, the Utah Flash, and was recalled on January 8, 2009. On November 21, 2009, the Celtics assigned Walker to the Maine Red Claws in the NBA Development League. On December 23, 2009, Walker was recalled from the Red Claws by the Celtics.

=== New York Knicks (2010–2012) ===
On February 18, 2010, Walker, along with J. R. Giddens, Eddie House and a future conditional second round draft pick, was traded to the Knicks for Nate Robinson and Marcus Landry.

Walker was released by the Knicks on April 20, 2012.

=== Austin Toros (2013) ===
On February 19, 2013, Walker was acquired by the Austin Toros. On March 25, he was waived by the Toros. On April 3, he was acquired by the Sioux Falls Skyforce. However, he never played a game for Sioux Falls.

=== Trotamundos de Carabobo (2013) ===
On May 20, 2013, Walker signed with Trotamundos de Carabobo of Venezuela.

=== Sioux Falls Skyforce (2013–2014) ===
On October 31, 2013, Walker was reacquired by the Sioux Falls Skyforce.

=== Alaska Aces (2014) ===
In April 2014, he signed with the Alaska Aces for the 2014 Governors’ Cup.

=== Second stint with Sioux Falls Skyforce (2014–2015) ===
On November 3, 2014, Walker was again reacquired by the Sioux Falls Skyforce.

=== Miami Heat (2015) ===
On February 21, 2015, he signed a 10-day contract with the Miami Heat. In his first game with the Heat, Walker recorded 11 points, and made 3 out of his 4 3-pointers in a 119–108 win over the Philadelphia 76ers. He then signed a second 10-day contract with the Heat on March 3, and for the rest of the season on March 13. On July 27, 2015, Walker was waived by the Heat.

=== Cedevita Zagreb (2015–2016) ===
On November 7, 2015, Walker signed with the Croatian club Cedevita Zagreb for the rest of the season.

=== NLEX Road Warriors (2016) ===
On June 8, 2016, Walker signed with the NLEX Road Warriors of the Philippine Basketball Association as the team's import for the 2016 PBA Governors' Cup.

=== Third stint with Sioux Falls Skyforce (2016–2017) ===
On November 16, Walker was reacquired by the Sioux Falls Skyforce.

=== Galatasaray (2018) ===
On January 2, 2018, Walker signed with Turkish club Galatasaray.

=== Defensor Sporting (2018) ===
On March 30, 2018, Walker was reported to have signed with Defensor Sporting.

=== Second stint with Blackwater Elite (2018) ===
On May 21, 2018, Walker signed again with the Blackwater Elite for the 2018 PBA Commissioner's Cup as a replacement for Jarrid Famous. He only just appeared in 5 games with the Elite in the 2018 PBA Commissioner's Cup. In those 5 games, he averaged 13 points per game, 10.2 rebounds per game and .6 blocks per game.

=== Shiga Lakestars (2019–2021) ===
On February 11, 2019, he signed with the Shiga Lakestars in the Japanese B.League.

=== Club La Cancha (2021) ===
On October 22, 2021, he signed with Club La Cancha.

=== Rain or Shine Elasto Painters (2021–2022) ===
In November 2021, Walker signed with Rain or Shine Elasto Painters of the Philippine Basketball Association (PBA).

== NBA career statistics ==
Legend
GP	Games played	GS	Games started	MPG	Minutes per game
FG%	Field goal percentage	3P%	3-point field goal percentage	FT%	Free throw percentage
RPG	Rebounds per game	APG	Assists per game	SPG	Steals per game
BPG	Blocks per game	PPG	Points per game	**Bold**	Career high

=== Regular season ===
Year	Team	GP	GS	MPG	FG%	3P%	FT%	RPG	APG	SPG	BPG	PPG
2008–09	Boston	29	0	7.4	**.621**	.000	.696	1.0	.4	.2	.1	3.0
2009–10	Boston	8	0	3.6	.500	.000	**1.000**	.6	.4	.0	.0	1.0
2009–10	New York	27	**13**	**27.4**	.518	**.431**	.787	3.1	**1.4**	.9	.1	**11.9**
2010–11	New York	**61**	1	12.9	.441	.386	.705	2.0	.6	.3	.1	4.9
2011–12	New York	32	8	19.4	.398	.319	.850	2.5	1.2	.6	.2	5.9
2014–15	Miami	24	**13**	26.2	.345	.341	.778	**3.4**	1.2	**1.0**	**.4**	7.3
Career		181	35	16.7	.446	.369	.760	2.2	.8	.5	.1	6.0

=== Playoffs ===
Year	Team	GP	GS	MPG	FG%	3P%	FT%	RPG	APG	SPG	BPG	PPG
2009	Boston	4	0	2.5	.000	.000	**1.000**	.0	.0	.5	.0	.5
2011	New York	4	0	**22.3**	**.300**	**.273**	.667	**3.3**	**1.0**	**1.3**	.0	**5.8**
Career		8	0	12.4	.281	.273	.800	1.6	.5	.9	.0	3.1

== Personal life ==
Having been known as Bill for most of his life, in January 2014, Walker began going by his middle name, Henry.

== See also ==
- 2006 high school boys basketball All-Americans
