= J. R. Giddens =

American former basketball player (born 1985)

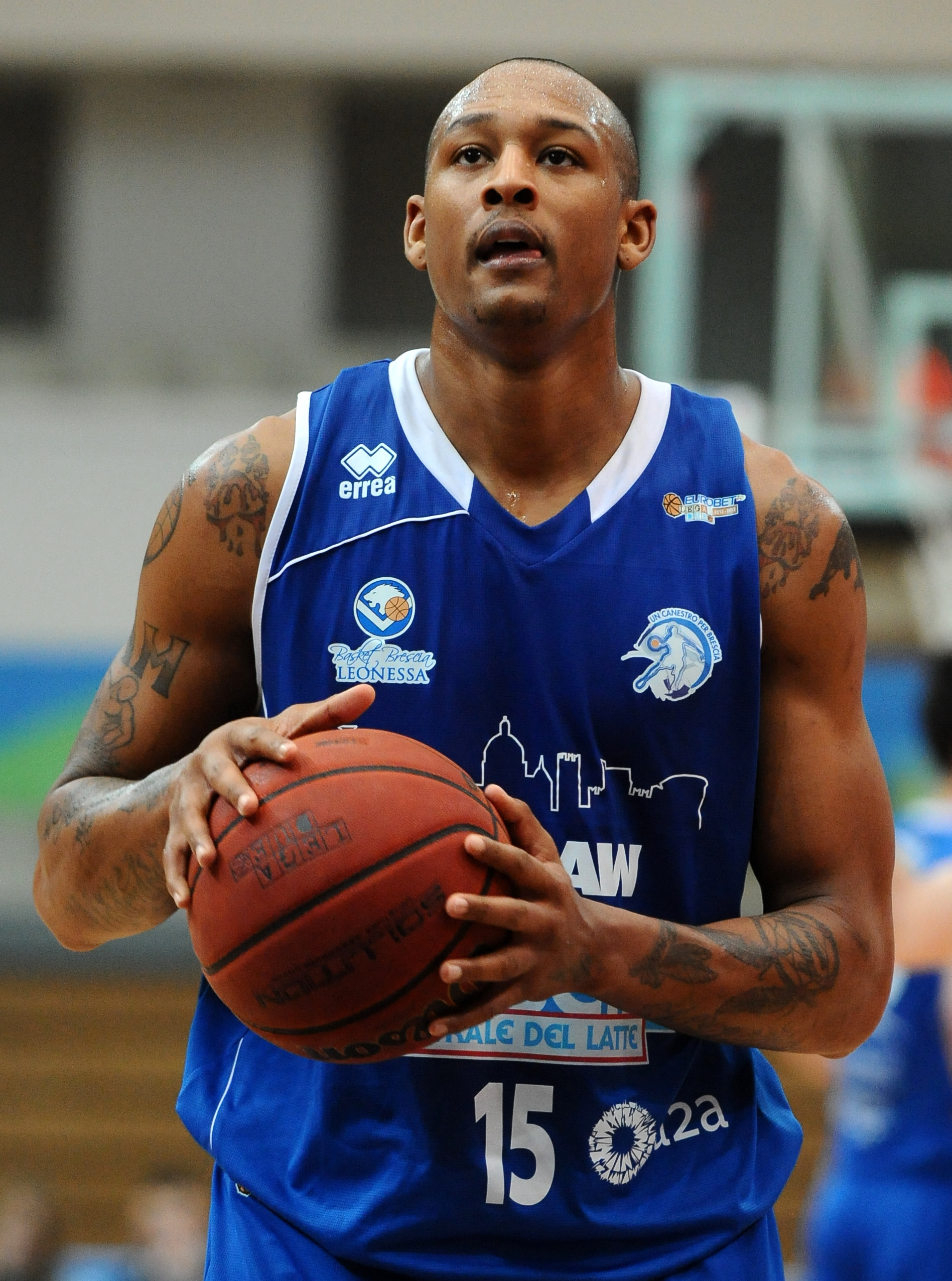
- Giddens with Brescia Leonessa in 2013

Personal information
- Born: February 13, 1985 (age 41) Oklahoma City, Oklahoma, U.S.
- Listed height: 6 ft 5 in (1.96 m)
- Listed weight: 215 lb (98 kg)

Career information
- High school: John Marshall (Oklahoma City, Oklahoma)
- College: Kansas (2003–2005); New Mexico (2006–2008)
- NBA draft: 2008: 1st round, 30th overall pick
- Drafted by: Boston Celtics
- Playing career: 2008–2019
- Position: Shooting guard
- Number: 4, 15

Career history
- 2008–2010: Boston Celtics
- 2008–2009: →Utah Flash
- 2010: Maine Red Claws
- 2010: New York Knicks
- 2010: Asseco Prokom Gdynia
- 2011: Valencia Basket
- 2011: New Mexico Thunderbirds
- 2011–2012: PAOK Thessaloniki
- 2012–2014: Brescia Leonessa
- 2014: Vaqueros de Bayamón
- 2014–2015: Peñarol de Mar del Plata
- 2015–2016: Instituto
- 2016: Leones de Santo Domingo
- 2017: Trouville
- 2017: Gregorio Urbano Gilbert
- 2017: Mineros de Parral
- 2018: Ferro Carril Oeste
- 2018: Pueblo Nuevo
- 2018: Halcones de Ciudad Obregón
- 2018: Correcaminos UAT Victoria
- 2019: Español de Talca
- 2019: Domingo Paulino
- 2019: Cañeros del Este

Career highlights
- Serie A2 Basket All-Star (2014); MWC Player of the Year (2008); First-team All-MWC (2008); McDonald's All-American (2003); Third-team Parade All-American (2003)
- Stats at NBA.com
- Stats at Basketball Reference

Justin Ray "J. R." Giddens (born February 13, 1985) is an American former professional basketball player. He was selected to the 2003 McDonald's All-American team, then initially played for the University of Kansas but transferred to the University of New Mexico following his sophomore season. He was selected with the 30th overall pick in the 2008 NBA draft by the Boston Celtics, and played for various professional teams until 2019. Giddens is the former head coach of the women's basketball team at Northern New Mexico College.

== College ==
Giddens accepted a scholarship offer from University of Kansas from then-head coach Roy Williams. After Williams left, Giddens was persuaded to stay by Williams' replacement Bill Self. In his first year at Kansas, Giddens earned All-Big 12 Conference Freshman honors while averaging 11 points per game. In May 2005 he was involved in a fight outside a bar in Lawrence and received a stab wound. He was later charged with battery for his role in the incident and left Kansas in a mutual agreement with Self. Giddens transferred to New Mexico and sat out the next season due to NCAA regulations. As a junior, he was suspended from the team in late February for disciplinary reasons and missed the team's summer trip to work on his academics. New Mexico hired head coach Steve Alford, who took a no-nonsense approach to discipline, and Giddens made a dramatic transformation. As a senior, he was named Mountain West Conference Co-Player of the Year and Honorable Mention All-American following career highs in points (16.3 per game) and rebounds (8.8 per game).

== Professional career ==
On June 26, 2008, Giddens was selected by the Boston Celtics with the 30th overall pick in the 2008 NBA draft. He had worked out with the Celtics for three days, and received praises from head coach Doc Rivers, who thought he could fight for minutes on the team right away. He was even mentioned as a possible replacement for restricted free agent Tony Allen. Giddens was already familiar with Leon Powe and Kendrick Perkins, who were his teammates at the 2003 McDonald's All-American Game. But on behalf of his agent Aaron Mintz, Giddens declined to work out at the Celtics' minicamp in early July, because he had not signed a contract yet.

On November 15, 2008, Giddens was assigned to the Boston Celtics' NBA Development League affiliate team, the Utah Flash. He had played with the Celtics in the 2008–09 pre-season but had been on the inactive list for the first 10 games of the regular season. He was recalled by the Celtics from Utah Flash development team on February 8, 2009.

Giddens started his first game for the Boston Celtics on January 2, 2010.

On February 18, 2010, Giddens, Bill Walker and Eddie House were traded to the New York Knicks for Nate Robinson and Marcus Landry.

On October 13, 2010, Giddens's agent said that Giddens would spend the 2010–11 season with Asseco Prokom Gdynia in Poland, but Giddens left the team in December 2010 by mutual consent.

In September 2011, Giddens signed with PAOK Thessaloniki of Greece.

In September 2012, Giddens signed with Basket Brescia Leonessa, an Italian Legadue team.

On June 30, 2014, he signed with Vaqueros de Bayamón of Puerto Rico.

On November 22, 2014, Giddens signed with Peñarol de Mar del Plata of Argentina. On March 10, 2015, he was waived by the Peñarol after appearing in seventeen LNB games.

In January 2017, Giddens signed with Club Trouville of the Liga Uruguaya de Basketball. The next month, he left the club after appearing in five games. On February 22, 2017, he signed with Mexican club Mineros de Parral.

On March 22, 2018, Giddens signed with Ferro Carril Oeste of the Liga Nacional de Básquet in Argentina.

== Stabbing incident ==
On May 19, 2005, Giddens was stabbed in his right calf in a bar fight in Lawrence, Kansas, requiring 30 stitches.

== Personal ==
- Majored in university studies.
- Cleared 6 ft 10 in (2.08 m) as a high jumper in high school.
- His parents are Charles and Dianna, and he has two sisters, Breeanna and Portia.
- Lists Steve Urkel and Mr. Rogers as his favorite television characters.
- Has sixteen tattoos, including his first initial "J" on his left triceps and his last initial "G" on his right triceps, and the Bible verse Philippians 4:13 – "I can do all things through Christ who gives me strength" – on his right shoulder.

== NBA career statistics ==
Legend
GP	Games played	GS	Games started	MPG	Minutes per game
FG%	Field goal percentage	3P%	3-point field goal percentage	FT%	Free throw percentage
RPG	Rebounds per game	APG	Assists per game	SPG	Steals per game
BPG	Blocks per game	PPG	Points per game	**Bold**	Career high

=== Regular season ===
Year	Team	GP	GS	MPG	FG%	3P%	FT%	RPG	APG	SPG	BPG	PPG
2008–09	Boston	6	0	1.3	**.667**	–	–	.5	.0	.2	.0	.7
2009–10	Boston	**21**	**1**	4.7	.429	.000	.500	1.0	.3	.2	.0	1.1
2009–10	New York	11	0	**12.7**	.487	.000	**.636**	**2.8**	**.6**	**.5**	**.1**	**4.1**
Career		38	1	6.5	.476	.000	.565	1.4	.3	.3	.1	1.9
