= Eddie House =

American basketball player (born 1978)

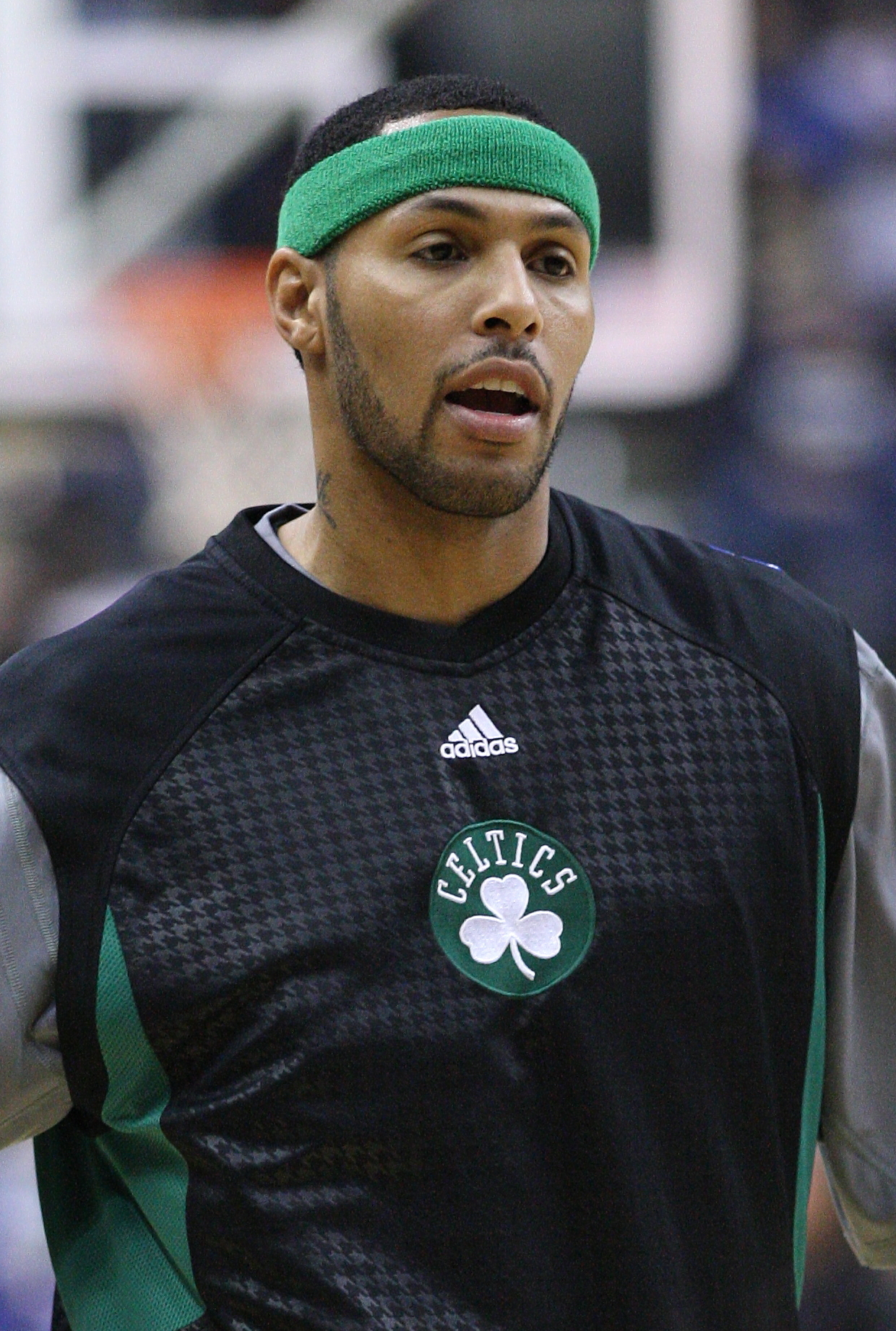
- House with the Celtics in 2008

Personal information
- Born: May 14, 1978 (age 48) Berkeley, California, U.S.
- Listed height: 6 ft 1 in (1.85 m)
- Listed weight: 190 lb (86 kg)

Career information
- High school: Hayward (Hayward, California)
- College: Arizona State (1996–2000)
- NBA draft: 2000: 2nd round, 37th overall pick
- Drafted by: Miami Heat
- Playing career: 2000–2011
- Position: Point guard / shooting guard
- Number: 5, 50, 55

Career history
- 2000–2003: Miami Heat
- 2003–2004: Los Angeles Clippers
- 2004: Milwaukee Bucks
- 2004–2005: Charlotte Bobcats
- 2005: Sacramento Kings
- 2005–2006: Phoenix Suns
- 2006–2007: New Jersey Nets
- 2007–2010: Boston Celtics
- 2010: New York Knicks
- 2010–2011: Miami Heat

Career highlights
- NBA champion (2008); Pac-10 Player of the Year (2000); 2× First-team All-Pac-10 (1999, 2000); Pac-10 All-Freshman team (1997); No. 5 jersey retired by Arizona State Sun Devils

Career NBA statistics
- Points: 5,356 (7.5 ppg)
- Rebounds: 1,223 (1.7 rpg)
- Assists: 1,112 (1.6 apg)
- Stats at NBA.com
- Stats at Basketball Reference

Edward Lee House II (born May 14, 1978) is an American former professional basketball player. A guard known for his three-point shooting, House played for nine NBA teams in 11 seasons in the league. He was a member of the Boston Celtics team that won the NBA championship in 2008, and is currently an analyst for Celtics games on NBC Sports Boston.

== Early life ==
House was born in the city of Berkeley, California, and was raised primarily in Union City, California, where he attended James Logan High School. He transferred to Hayward High School because he was forbidden from playing on the Logan varsity team in his freshman year. At Hayward, he was named All-Hayward Area Athletic League and All-Eastbay in both his junior and senior years, and graduated in 1996. He wanted to play for University of California, Berkeley, but coaches of that school felt that House was not ready for a major college basketball program, and recommended that House begin at a junior college.

== College career ==
House attended Arizona State University in Tempe, Arizona, on a full-ride scholarship. He is the all-time scoring leader at ASU with 2,044 points in his career, and is the only player to score more than 2,000 points. He, Ike Diogu, and James Harden are the only three Sun Devils to be named Pac-10 Player of the Year, and he was the fifth Sun Devil to be voted onto the All-Conference team twice.

He also is the career record-holder at Arizona State for field goals and steals, and set the single-season scoring average record for the school with 23.0 points per game in 1999–2000. During that season he was named Pac-10 Player of the Week a record-tying four times (matched only by Ed O'Bannon, Chris Mills, Gary Payton, and Quincy Pondexter).

House set a single-game Arizona State record with a 61-point effort in a 111–108 double-overtime victory against the California Golden Bears on the road in his senior season. The point total tied the Pac-10's single game record and was the highest total for the 1999–2000 NCAA Division I men's basketball season. It also was a memorable homecoming of sorts for him, as he had starred in high school for nearby Hayward High School. House also set a record in the game with 18 made free throws in 19 attempts. House is the first Pac-10 player to notch four 40-point games in one season as he had 61 vs. Cal, 46 vs. San Diego State, 42 vs. Penn State and 40 vs. UCLA. He also posted eight 30-point games that same season and set ASU records in points (736) and points per game (23.0). Also led the team in assists (111) and steals (74), as the 74 steals is tied for second on ASU single-season list. He is one of only three players to average in double figures in four consecutive seasons at Arizona State since it joined the Pac-10. In 2010, House was inducted into the Arizona State Sun Devil Athletics Hall of Fame.

Prior to the 2014 Fiesta Bowl, House gave a motivational speech to the Boise State Broncos football team on the importance of beating their opponent, the University of Arizona Wildcats. The Broncos won 38–30.

== NBA career ==
In the NBA, House was known for his three-point shooting.

He was selected by the Miami Heat in the second round (37th overall) of the 2000 NBA draft. He played in Miami for three seasons before leaving for the Los Angeles Clippers in free agency. After just one year in Los Angeles, House was traded to the Charlotte Bobcats. He then spent the 2004–05 NBA season playing for Charlotte, Milwaukee Bucks and Sacramento Kings. The following season House was signed by the Phoenix Suns; they reached the Western Conference Finals before losing to the Dallas Mavericks.

On August 17, 2006, he signed a one-year, $1.5 million deal with the New Jersey Nets.

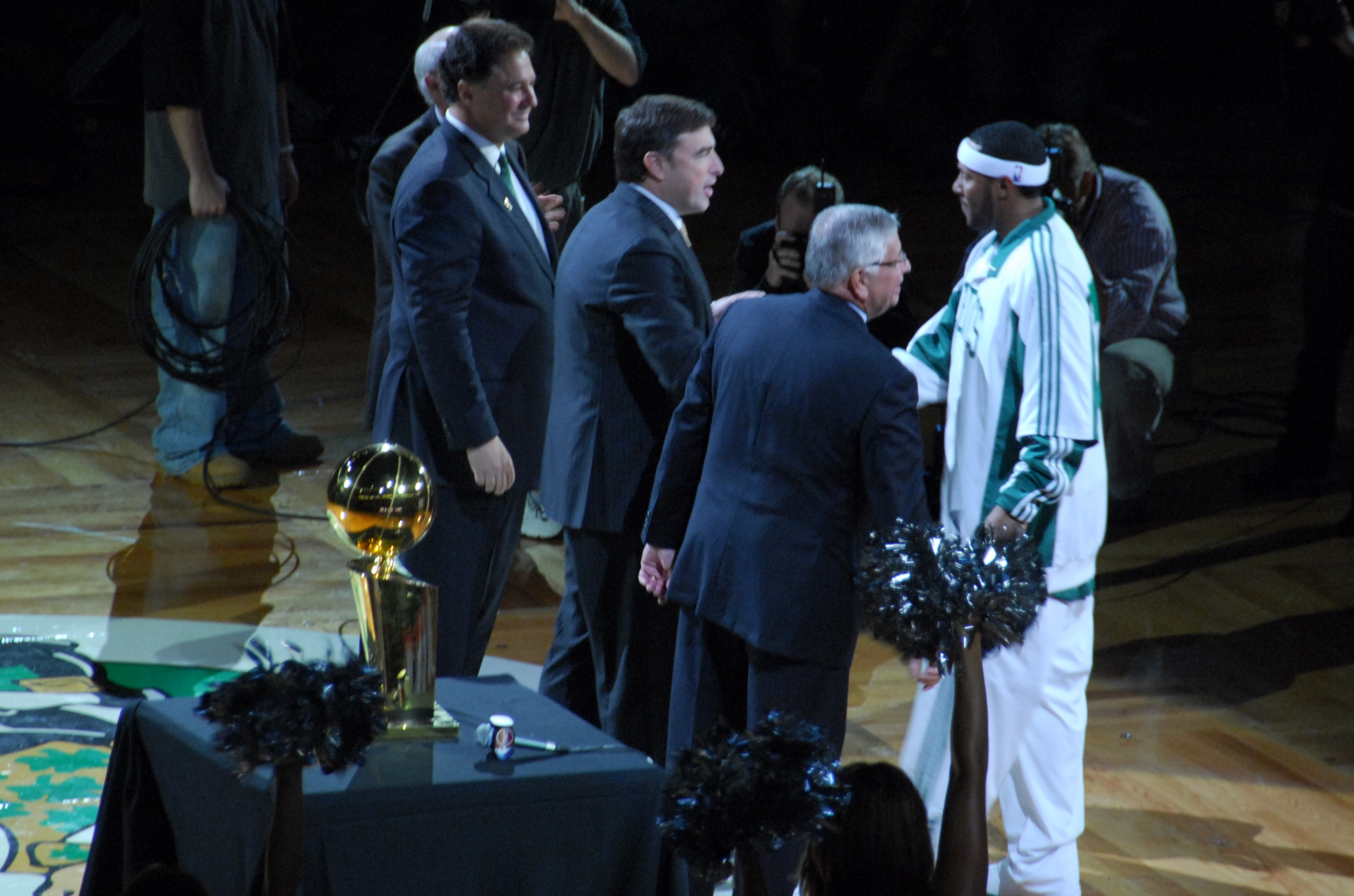
House receiving his 2008 NBA Finals ring

On August 9, 2007, he signed a one-year, $1.5 million deal with the Boston Celtics. He joined a cast of all-stars dubbed as the Big Three – Paul Pierce, Kevin Garnett and Ray Allen. The team won the 2008 NBA Finals with House playing as a backup guard for either Ray Allen or Rajon Rondo. He played a pivotal role in the team's comeback victory in Game 4, knocking down two clutch three-pointers down the stretch. On July 23, 2008, he re-signed with the Celtics on a 2-year, $5.6 million deal, with the second year as player's option. During the 2008–09 regular season, he broke Danny Ainge's Celtics team record for best 3-point percentage in a season by shooting 44.4%.

On February 18, 2010, House, Bill Walker and J.R. Giddens were traded to the New York Knicks for Nate Robinson and Marcus Landry.

In July 2010 House's agent said that the guard agreed to terms on a $2.8 million, two-year contract to return to the Miami Heat.

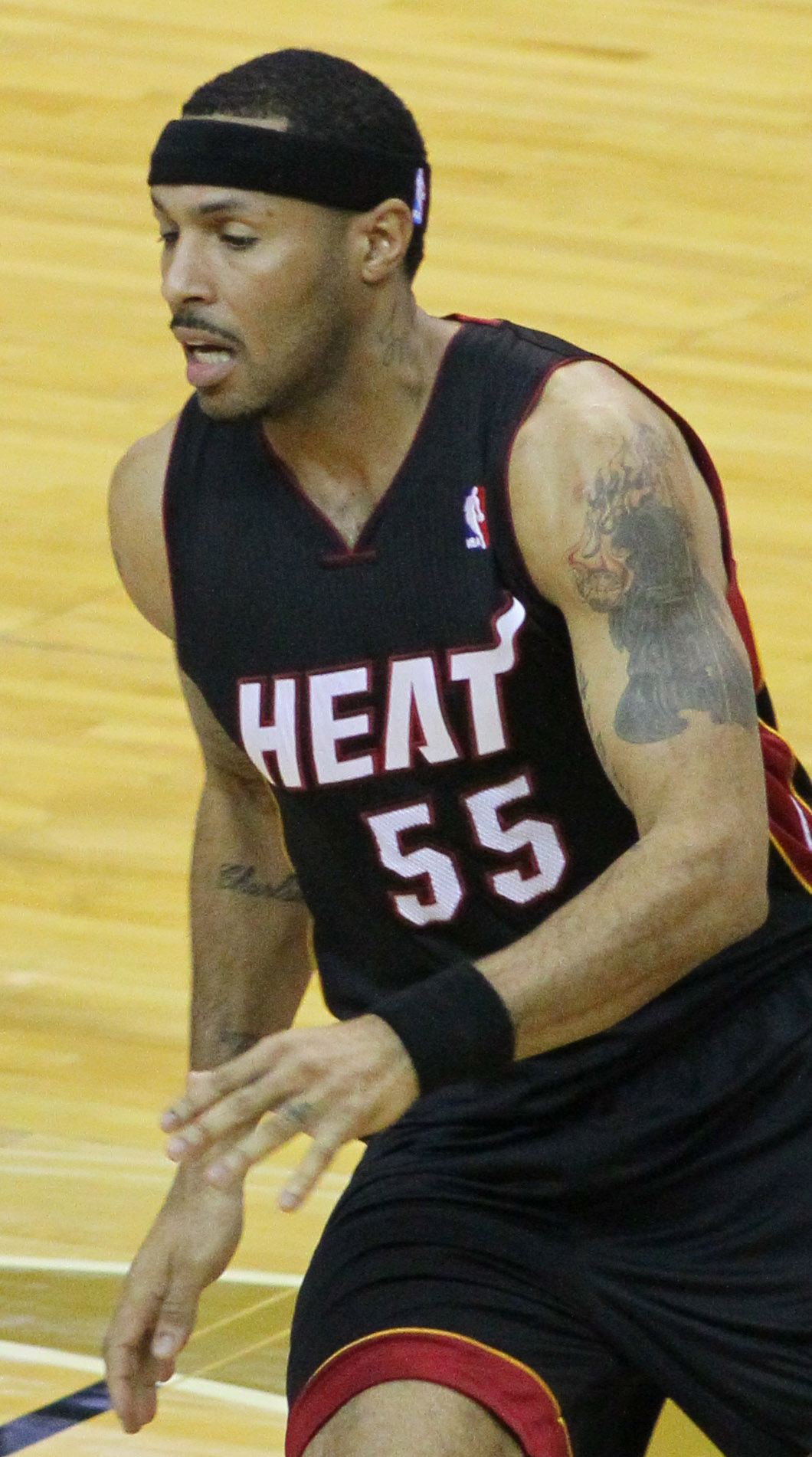
House with the Miami Heat in 2010

On April 13, 2011, vs the Toronto Raptors, House scored a career high 35 points, beating his career NBA record by four points. The Heat made the 2011 NBA Finals and were defeated by the Dallas Mavericks in six games. Game 6 of that Finals series ended up being House's final NBA game ever. The Heat lost Game 6 95–105 and House recorded 9 points, 3 rebounds, 1 assist and 1 steal.

On June 30, 2011, House exercised an option clause in his contract, agreeing to a one-year, $1.4 million extension with the Heat. On Christmas Eve, he was waived by the Heat without playing a game for them during the 2011–2012 season.

== Broadcasting career ==
Following his retirement House became a color analyst for the PAC-12 Network’s college basketball coverage, a position he would hold for nearly a decade. House also does analyst work for Fox Sports 1, CBS and Arizona Sports 98.7 on SiriusXM.

In 2022, House joined NBC Sports Boston's Celtics pre- and post-game shows, and is a fill-in color commentator for Celtics broadcasts on the network.

== Personal life ==
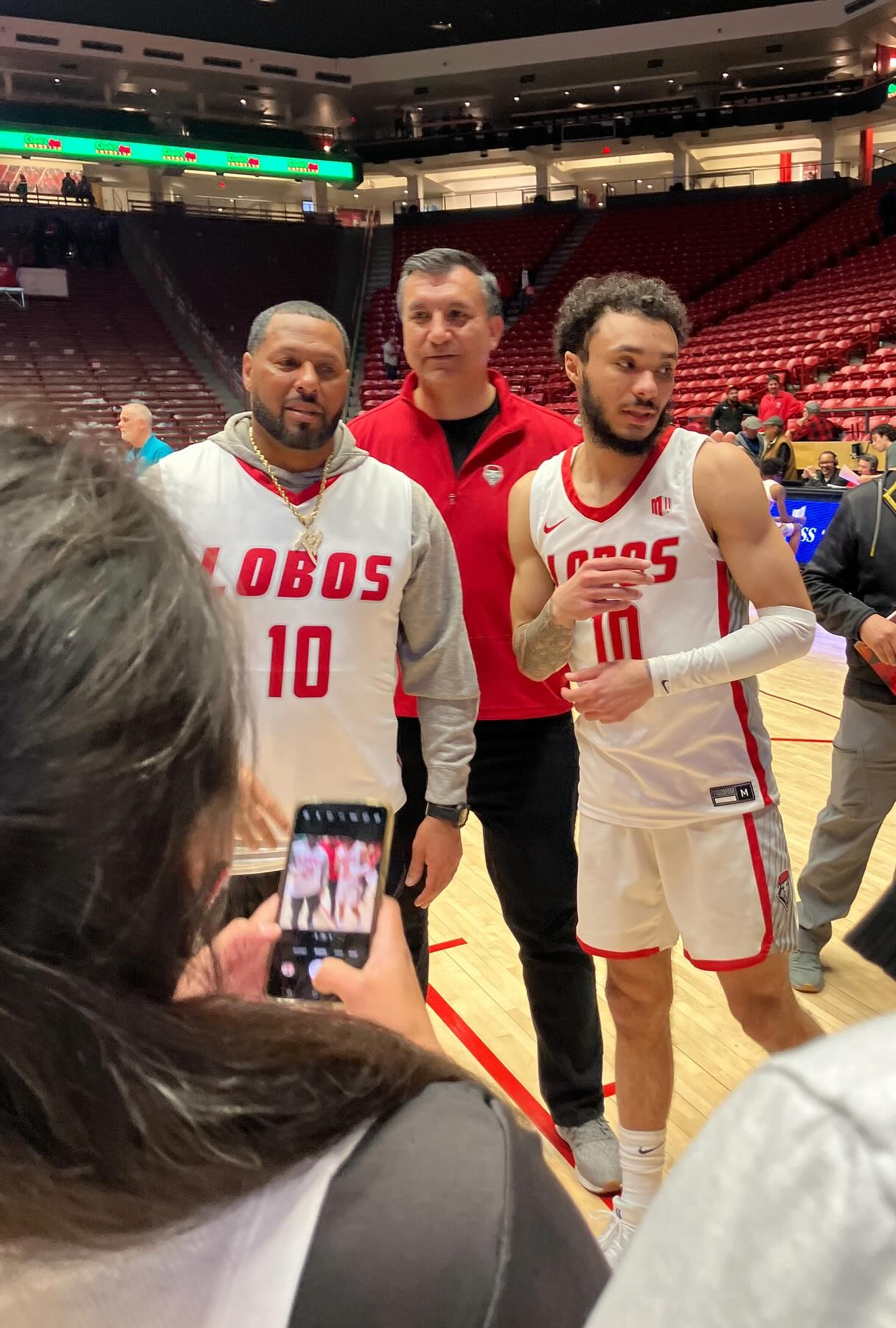
Eddie (left) and Jaelen House in 2024

House is the son of Edward House and Deborah Buck, and he has two brothers, Diallo Buck and Mychal House. During his rookie season with Miami in 2000–01, he married the sister of professional basketball player Mike Bibby. The couple has three sons: Jaelen, who played basketball for Arizona State for one year before transferring to the University of New Mexico; and twins Kaden and Kalek. House and his wife later divorced. Both House and Bibby played for the Sacramento Kings in 2004–05 and the Miami Heat in 2010–11.

== Career statistics ==
Legend
GP	Games played	GS	Games started	MPG	Minutes per game
FG%	Field goal percentage	3P%	3-point field goal percentage	FT%	Free throw percentage
RPG	Rebounds per game	APG	Assists per game	SPG	Steals per game
BPG	Blocks per game	PPG	Points per game	**Bold**	Career high
†	Won an NBA championship

=== College ===
Year	Team	GP	GS	MPG	FG%	3P%	FT%	RPG	APG	SPG	BPG	PPG
1996–97	Arizona State	30	22	29.5	.416	.318	.643	2.8	**3.6**	2.0	**.3**	12.6
1997–98	Arizona State	**32**	**31**	29.8	**.432**	**.401**	.759	3.0	2.9	2.0	.2	11.3
1998–99	Arizona State	30	30	36.9	**.432**	.389	.791	4.9	3.1	2.0	.1	18.9
1999–2000	Arizona State	**32**	**31**	**37.2**	.422	.365	**.835**	**5.5**	3.5	**2.3**	.1	**23.0**
Career		124	114	33.4	.425	.366	.798	4.0	3.3	2.1	.2	16.5

=== NBA ===
==== Regular season ====
Year	Team	GP	GS	MPG	FG%	3P%	FT%	RPG	APG	SPG	BPG	PPG
2000–01	Miami	50	0	11.0	.421	.345	.686	.8	1.0	.3	.0	5.0
2001–02	Miami	64	3	19.2	.399	.344	.857	1.7	1.9	.7	.1	8.0
2002–03	Miami	55	7	18.6	.387	.300	.861	1.8	1.6	.8	.0	7.5
2003–04	L.A. Clippers	60	**10**	19.8	.359	.375	.800	**2.3**	**2.5**	1.1	.1	6.8
2004–05	Charlotte	13	5	**23.1**	.452	.414	.769	1.5	1.8	**1.8**	**.2**	**11.1**
2004–05	Milwaukee	5	0	8.2	.353	**.667**	.000	.6	1.0	.4	.0	3.2
2004–05	Sacramento	50	2	11.0	**.458**	.452	.929	1.2	1.3	.4	.1	4.7
2005–06	Phoenix	**81**	0	17.5	.422	.389	.805	1.6	1.8	.5	.1	9.8
2006–07	New Jersey	56	1	16.9	.428	.429	.917	1.6	1.2	.5	.1	8.4
2007–08†	Boston	78	2	19.0	.409	.393	.917	2.1	1.9	.8	.1	7.5
2008–09	Boston	**81**	0	18.3	.445	.444	.792	1.9	1.1	.8	.1	8.5
2009–10	Boston	50	0	16.9	.401	.383	.900	1.4	1.0	.6	.1	7.2
2009–10	New York	18	0	20.6	.331	.250	**1.000**	2.2	2.1	.7	.0	6.4
2010–11	Miami	56	1	17.5	.399	.389	.950	1.6	1.1	.6	.1	6.5
Career		717	31	17.3	.409	.390	.851	1.7	1.6	.7	.1	7.5

==== Playoffs ====
Year	Team	GP	GS	MPG	FG%	3P%	FT%	RPG	APG	SPG	BPG	PPG
2001	Miami	3	0	**21.3**	.400	.286	.800	**1.7**	**1.7**	**1.0**	**.3**	**12.7**
2005	Sacramento	3	0	7.7	.375	**1.000**	**1.000**	.7	1.3	.0	.0	3.0
2006	Phoenix	14	0	9.3	.365	.214	.750	.6	.4	.1	.1	3.1
2007	New Jersey	4	0	4.5	.250	.167	.000	.5	.3	.3	.0	1.3
2008†	Boston	**21**	0	7.9	.304	.355	.875	1.0	.9	.2	.0	2.5
2009	Boston	14	0	16.6	**.519**	.486	.909	1.4	.9	.8	.0	7.7
2011	Miami	7	0	6.9	.235	.300	.000	.7	.1	.6	.0	1.6
Career		66	0	10.3	.391	.368	.867	1.0	.7	.4	.1	4.0

== See also ==
- List of NCAA Division I men's basketball players with 60 or more points in a game
