= 2011–12 Chicago Bulls season =

NBA professional basketball team season

- Division champions
- Head coach: Tom Thibodeau
- President: Michael Reinsdorf
- General manager: Gar Forman
- Owners: Jerry Reinsdorf
- Arena: United Center

Results
- Record: 50–16 (.758)
- Place: Division: 1st (Central); Conference: 1st (Eastern)
- Playoff finish: First round (lost to 76ers 2–4)
- Stats at Basketball Reference

Local media
- Television: CSN Chicago (35 games); WGN America (10 games); WGN-TV (14 games); WCIU-TV (6 games)
- Radio: WMVP

The 2011–12 Chicago Bulls season was the 46th season of the franchise in the National Basketball Association (NBA). The Bulls finished the lockout-shortened season with a 50–16 record, or roughly 62–20 in a full season, the same exact record from the previous season, tying the San Antonio Spurs for the best record of the season. They ended as the number one seed in the Eastern Conference for a second consecutive season.

Chicago started their playoff run on April 28, taking Game 1 of the first round against the Philadelphia 76ers at the United Center. However, that victory was marred with the season-ending injury of point guard and reigning MVP Derrick Rose, who tore his anterior cruciate ligament in the final minutes of the game. Chicago then lost three games in a row and were also without the services of starting center Joakim Noah for Games 4 and 5 of the series following an injury in his left ankle during Game 3 in Philadelphia. The Bulls won one more game at home before losing the series 2–4 in Philadelphia and became the fifth number one seed in league history to lose a playoffs series against a number eight seed, following the Seattle SuperSonics in 1994, the Miami Heat in 1999, the Dallas Mavericks in 2007, the San Antonio Spurs in 2011, and followed by the Milwaukee Bucks in 2023.

== Key dates ==
- June 23: The 2011 NBA draft took place at Prudential Center in Newark, New Jersey.
- November 1: Chicago Bulls first game of the season, against the Dallas Mavericks was scheduled, but was cancelled due to the lockout.
- December 25: Chicago Bulls first game of the season, against the Los Angeles Lakers. The Bulls won 88–87, in Los Angeles.
- March 24: Chicago secured a spot in the 2012 NBA Playoffs with a 102–101 victory against the Toronto Raptors.
- April 12: The Bulls clinch the Central Division title with a 96–86 win against the Miami Heat.

== Summary ==
=== NBA draft ===
Round	Pick	Player	Position	Nationality	School/Club team
1	23	Nikola Mirotić	F	Spain	Real Madrid (Spain)
1	30	Jimmy Butler	G/F	United States	Marquette

== Roster ==
2011–12 Chicago Bulls roster
Players

Pos.	No.	Player	Height	Weight	DOB	From
C	3	Ömer Aşık	7 ft 0 in (2.13 m)	255 lb (116 kg)	1986-07-04	Turkey
F	5	Carlos Boozer	6 ft 9 in (2.06 m)	266 lb (121 kg)	1981-11-20	Duke
G	11	Ronnie Brewer	6 ft 7 in (2.01 m)	227 lb (103 kg)	1985-03-20	Arkansas
G	21	Jimmy Butler	6 ft 7 in (2.01 m)	220 lb (100 kg)	1989-09-14	Marquette
F	9	Luol Deng	6 ft 9 in (2.06 m)	220 lb (100 kg)	1985-04-16	Duke
F	22	Taj Gibson	6 ft 9 in (2.06 m)	225 lb (102 kg)	1985-06-24	USC
G	32	Richard Hamilton	6 ft 7 in (2.01 m)	193 lb (88 kg)	1978-02-14	Connecticut
G	8	Mike James	6 ft 0 in (1.83 m)	188 lb (85 kg)	1975-06-23	Duquesne
F	26	Kyle Korver	6 ft 7 in (2.01 m)	212 lb (96 kg)	1981-03-17	Creighton
G	15	John III Lucas	5 ft 11 in (1.80 m)	165 lb (75 kg)	1982-11-21	Oklahoma State
C	13	Joakim Noah	6 ft 11 in (2.11 m)	232 lb (105 kg)	1985-02-25	Florida
G	1	Derrick Rose	6 ft 2 in (1.88 m)	190 lb (86 kg)	1988-10-04	Memphis
F	24	Brian Scalabrine	6 ft 9 in (2.06 m)	235 lb (107 kg)	1978-03-18	USC
G	7	C. J. Watson	6 ft 2 in (1.88 m)	175 lb (79 kg)	1984-04-17	Tennessee

Coaches
Head coach
- Tom Thibodeau
Assistant(s)
- Ron Adams
- Rick Brunson
- Andy Greer
- Adrian Griffin
- Ed Pinckney
- Mike Wilhelm
- Fred Tedeschi (trainer)

Legend
- (DP) Unsigned draft pick
- (FA) Free agent
- (S) Suspended
- Injured

Roster
Updated: April 5, 2012

== Pre-season ==
2011 pre-season game log
Pre-season: 2–0 (home: 1–0; road: 1–0)

Game	Date	Team	Score	High points	High rebounds	High assists	Location Attendance	Record
1	December 16	@ Indiana	95–86	Derrick Rose, Luol Deng (16)	Taj Gibson (9)	Derrick Rose (4)	Conseco Fieldhouse 14,013	1–0
2	December 20	Indiana	93–85	Carlos Boozer (24)	Joakim Noah (8)	Derrick Rose (9)	United Center 21,659	2–0

2011–12 season schedule

== Regular season ==
=== Standings ===
Central Division	W	L	PCT	GB	Home	Road	Div	GP
z-Chicago Bulls	50	16	.758	–	26–7	24–9	13–1	66
x-Indiana Pacers	42	24	.636	8	23–10	19–14	9–4	66
Milwaukee Bucks	31	35	.470	19	17–16	14–19	7–8	66
Detroit Pistons	25	41	.379	25	18–15	7–26	4–11	66
Cleveland Cavaliers	21	45	.318	29	11–22	10–23	3–12	66

Eastern Conference
#	Team	W	L	PCT	GB	GP
1	z-Chicago Bulls	50	16	.758	–	66
2	y-Miami Heat *	46	20	.697	4.0	66
3	x-Indiana Pacers *	42	24	.636	8.0	66
4	y-Boston Celtics	39	27	.591	11.0	66
5	x-Atlanta Hawks	40	26	.606	10.0	66
6	x-Orlando Magic	37	29	.561	13.0	66
7	x-New York Knicks	36	30	.545	14.0	66
8	x-Philadelphia 76ers	35	31	.530	15.0	66
9	Milwaukee Bucks	31	35	.470	19.0	66
10	Detroit Pistons	25	41	.379	25.0	66
11	Toronto Raptors	23	43	.348	27.0	66
12	New Jersey Nets	22	44	.333	28.0	66
13	Cleveland Cavaliers	21	45	.318	29.0	66
14	Washington Wizards	20	46	.303	30.0	66
15	Charlotte Bobcats	7	59	.106	43.0	66

=== Game log ===
2011–12 game log
Total: 50–16 (home: 26–7; road: 24–9)
December: 3–1 (home: 0–0; road: 3–1)

Game	Date	Team	Score	High points	High rebounds	High assists	Location Attendance	Record
1	December 25	@ L. A. Lakers	W 88–87	Derrick Rose (22)	Joakim Noah (9)	Derrick Rose (5)	Staples Center; 18,997	1–0
2	December 26	@ Golden State	L 91–99	Luol Deng (22)	Luol Deng; Joakim Noah (10)	Derrick Rose (8)	Oracle Arena; 19,596	1–1
3	December 29	@ Sacramento	W 108–98	Derrick Rose (19)	Carlos Boozer (15)	C. J. Watson (9)	Power Balance Pavilion; 17,317	2–1
4	December 30	@ L. A. Clippers	W 114–101	Derrick Rose (29)	Derrick Rose (8)	Derrick Rose (16)	Staples Center; 19,426	3–1

January: 15–4 (home: 9–1; road: 6–3)

Game	Date	Team	Score	High points	High rebounds	High assists	Location Attendance	Record
5	January 1	Memphis	W 104–64	Carlos Boozer; Ronnie Brewer (17)	Carlos Boozer (11)	Derrick Rose (6)	United Center; 22,763	4–1
6	January 3	Atlanta	W 76–74	Derrick Rose (30)	Carlos Boozer (9)	Derrick Rose (7)	United Center; 22,166	5–1
7	January 4	@ Detroit	W 99–83	Carlos Boozer (19)	Joakim Noah (11)	Derrick Rose (10)	The Palace of Auburn Hills; 9,125	6–1
8	January 6	@ Orlando	W 97–83	Derrick Rose; Luol Deng (21)	Carlos Boozer (13)	Derrick Rose (10)	Amway Center; 18,192	7–1
9	January 7	@ Atlanta	L 94–109	John Lucas (16)	Ömer Aşık (13)	Derrick Rose (6)	Philips Arena; 17,112	7–2
10	January 9	Detroit	W 92–68	Carlos Boozer (23)	Carlos Boozer; Joakim Noah (8)	Derrick Rose (8)	United Center; 21,530	8–2
11	January 10	@ Minnesota	W 111–100	Derrick Rose (31)	Luol Deng; Joakim Noah (11)	Derrick Rose (11)	Target Center; 19,356	9–2
12	January 11	Washington	W 78–64	John Lucas (25)	Luol Deng (15)	John Lucas (8)	United Center; 21,366	10–2
13	January 13	@ Boston	W 88–79	Derrick Rose (25)	Luol Deng (16)	Derrick Rose (7)	TD Garden; 18,624	11–2
14	January 14	Toronto	W 77–64	Derrick Rose (18)	Carlos Boozer (13)	Derrick Rose (11)	United Center; 21,962	12–2
15	January 16	@ Memphis	L 86–102	Luol Deng (20)	Carlos Boozer (7)	C. J. Watson; Luol Deng (3)	FedExForum; 18,119	12–3
16	January 17	Phoenix	W 118–97	Carlos Boozer (31)	Joakim Noah (12)	Richard Hamilton; Kyle Korver (6)	United Center; 21,347	13–3
17	January 20	@ Cleveland	W 114–75	Luol Deng (21)	Carlos Boozer (14)	C. J. Watson (7)	Quicken Loans Arena; 17,871	14–3
18	January 21	Charlotte	W 95–89	Carlos Boozer (23)	Ömer Aşık (15)	Mike James (10)	United Center; 21,861	15–3
19	January 23	New Jersey	W 110–95	Richard Hamilton (22)	Joakim Noah (10)	Richard Hamilton (10)	United Center; 21,572	16–3
20	January 25	Indiana	L 90–95	Derrick Rose (24)	Joakim Noah (13)	Ronnie Brewer (5)	United Center; 21,755	16–4
21	January 27	Milwaukee	W 107–100	Derrick Rose (34)	Joakim Noah (16)	Ronnie Brewer (6)	United Center; 22,368	17–4
22	January 29	@ Miami	L 93–97	Derrick Rose (34)	Joakim Noah (11)	Derrick Rose (11)	American Airlines Arena; 20,054	17–5
23	January 30	@ Washington	W 98–88	Derrick Rose (35)	Joakim Noah (13)	Derrick Rose (8)	Verizon Center; 18,357	18–5

February: 11–3 (home: 5–1; road: 6–2)

Game	Date	Team	Score	High points	High rebounds	High assists	Location Attendance	Record
24	February 1	@ Philadelphia	L 82–98	C. J. Watson (20)	Carlos Boozer (9)	Derrick Rose (6)	Wells Fargo Center; 18,325	18–6
25	February 2	@ New York	W 105–102	Derrick Rose (32)	Carlos Boozer; Joakim Noah (9)	Derrick Rose (13)	Madison Square Garden; 19,763	19–6
26	February 4	@ Milwaukee	W 113–90	Derrick Rose (26)	Luol Deng; Joakim Noah (9)	Derrick Rose (13)	Bradley Center; 18,717	20–6
27	February 6	@ New Jersey	W 108–87	Carlos Boozer (24)	Joakim Noah (12)	C. J. Watson (11)	Prudential Center; 15,327	21–6
28	February 8	@ New Orleans	W 90–67	Carlos Boozer (18)	Joakim Noah (10)	Derrick Rose (6)	New Orleans Arena; 15,456	22–6
29	February 10	@ Charlotte	W 95–64	Joakim Noah (17)	Joakim Noah (14)	C. J. Watson (5)	Time Warner Cable Arena; 19,379	23–6
30	February 12	@ Boston	L 91–95	Carlos Boozer; C. J. Watson (22)	Joakim Noah (9)	Ronnie Brewer; C. J. Watson (6)	TD Garden; 18,624	23–7
31	February 14	Sacramento	W 121–115	Luol Deng (23)	Joakim Noah (11)	Luol Deng (11)	United Center; 21,936	24–7
32	February 16	Boston	W 89–80	Luol Deng; Carlos Boozer (23)	Joakim Noah (16)	Luol Deng (10)	United Center; 22,592	25–7
33	February 18	New Jersey	L 85–97	Carlos Boozer; Mike James (16)	Carlos Boozer; Taj Gibson (9)	Mike James (7)	United Center; 22,300	25–8
34	February 20	Atlanta	W 90–79	Derrick Rose (23)	Joakim Noah (16)	Derrick Rose (6)	United Center; 22,033	26–8
35	February 22	Milwaukee	W 110–91	Carlos Boozer (20)	Joakim Noah (13)	Joakim Noah (10)	United Center; 21,507	27–8
All-Star Break
36	February 28	New Orleans	W 99–95	Derrick Rose (32)	Joakim Noah (16)	Derrick Rose (9)	United Center; 21,919	28–8
37	February 29	@ San Antonio	W 96–89	Derrick Rose (29)	Joakim Noah (13)	Derrick Rose; C.J. Watson (4)	AT&T Center; 18,581	29–8

March: 13–3 (home: 7–3; road: 6–0)

Game	Date	Team	Score	High points	High rebounds	High assists	Location Attendance	Record
38	March 2	@ Cleveland	W 112–91	Luol Deng (24)	Carlos Boozer (11)	Derrick Rose (9)	Quicken Loans Arena; 20,562	30–8
39	March 4	@ Philadelphia	W 96–91	Derrick Rose (35)	Joakim Noah (18)	Derrick Rose (8)	Wells Fargo Center; 19,683	31–8
40	March 5	Indiana	W 92–72	Luol Deng (20)	Joakim Noah (17)	Derrick Rose (9)	United Center; 22,106	32–8
41	March 7	@ Milwaukee	W 106–104	Derrick Rose (30)	Joakim Noah (10)	Derrick Rose (11)	Bradley Center; 15,389	33–8
42	March 8	Orlando	L 94–99	Carlos Boozer (26)	Joakim Noah (10)	Derrick Rose (9)	United Center; 22,127	33–9
43	March 10	Utah	W 111–97	Carlos Boozer (27)	Carlos Boozer (8)	Derrick Rose (13)	United Center; 22,158	34–9
44	March 12	New York	W 104–99	Derrick Rose (32)	Taj Gibson (13)	Derrick Rose; Ronnie Brewer (7)	United Center; 22,863	35–9
45	March 14	Miami	W 106–102	John Lucas III (24)	Carlos Boozer; Taj Gibson (8)	Carlos Boozer (5)	United Center; 23,028	36–9
46	March 16	Portland	L 89–100	Carlos Boozer (22)	Carlos Boozer (14)	Joakim Noah (5)	United Center; 22,022	36–10
47	March 17	Philadelphia	W 89–80	C.J. Watson (20)	Joakim Noah (11)	Joakim Noah; Taj Gibson (4)	United Center; 22,225	37–10
48	March 19	@ Orlando	W 85–59	Carlos Boozer (24)	Carlos Boozer (13)	Joakim Noah (5)	Amway Center; 18,998	38–10
49	March 21	@ Toronto	W 94–82	Luol Deng (17)	Luol Deng (10)	Joakim Noah (5)	Air Canada Centre; 17,869	39–10
50	March 24	Toronto	W 102–101 (OT)	Carlos Boozer (24)	Carlos Boozer; Luol Deng (10)	John Lucas III (6)	United Center; 21,841	40–10
51	March 26	Denver	L 91–108	C.J. Watson (17)	Carlos Boozer; Taj Gibson (7)	C.J. Watson (8)	United Center; 22,274	40–11
52	March 28	@ Atlanta	W 98–77	Luol Deng (22)	Carlos Boozer (9)	John Lucas III (5)	Philips Arena; 16,290	41–11
53	March 30	Detroit	W 83–71	Luol Deng (20)	Joakim Noah (12)	C.J. Watson (5)	United Center; 22,385	42–11

April: 8–5 (home: 5–2; road: 3–3)

Game	Date	Team	Score	High points	High rebounds	High assists	Location Attendance	Record
54	April 1	@ Oklahoma City	L 78–92	John Lucas III (19)	Taj Gibson (11)	Kyle Korver; John Lucas III (4)	Chesapeake Energy Arena; 18,203	42–12
55	April 2	Houston	L 93–99	Luol Deng (24)	Carlos Boozer (13)	Carlos Boozer (7)	United Center; 21,936	42–13
56	April 5	Boston	W 93–86	Luol Deng (26)	Carlos Boozer (14)	C.J. Watson (8)	United Center; 22,423	43–13
57	April 8	@ New York	L 99–100 (OT)	Derrick Rose (29)	Carlos Boozer (16)	Derrick Rose (4)	Madison Square Garden; 19,763	43–14
58	April 10	New York	W 98–86	Richard Hamilton (20)	Luol Deng (10)	C.J. Watson (7)	United Center; 22,131	44–14
59	April 12	Miami	W 96–86 (OT)	Carlos Boozer (19)	Carlos Boozer (11)	C.J. Watson (9)	United Center; 23,015	45–14
60	April 15	@ Detroit	W 100–94 (OT)	Derrick Rose (24)	Joakim Noah (17)	Derrick Rose (9)	The Palace of Auburn Hills; 17,450	46–14
61	April 16	Washington	L 84–87	Richard Hamilton (22)	Carlos Boozer (13)	C.J. Watson (8)	United Center; 22,307	46–15
62	April 18	@ Charlotte	W 100–68	Richard Hamilton (22)	Ömer Aşık (15)	Richard Hamilton (6)	Time Warner Cable Arena; 14,221	47–15
63	April 19	@ Miami	L 72–83	John Lucas III (16)	Joakim Noah (10)	C.J. Watson; John Lucas III (4)	American Airlines Arena; 20,008	47–16
64	April 21	Dallas	W 93–83	Luol Deng (22)	Joakim Noah (14)	Derrick Rose; Joakim Noah (8)	United Center; 22,945	48–16
65	April 25	@ Indiana	W 92–87	Kyle Korver (20)	Joakim Noah (14)	Derrick Rose (7)	Bankers Life Fieldhouse; 18,165	49–16
66	April 26	Cleveland	W 107–75	John Lucas III (25)	Joakim Noah; Taj Gibson (12)	C.J. Watson (8)	United Center; 22,563	50–16

2011–12 season schedule

== Player statistics ==
Legend
GP	Games played	GS	Games started	MPG	Minutes per game
FG%	Field-goal percentage	3P%	3-point field-goal percentage	FT%	Free-throw percentage
RPG	Rebounds per game	APG	Assists per game	SPG	Steals per game
BPG	Blocks per game	PPG	Points per game

=== Season ===
Player	GP	GS	MPG	FG%	3P%	FT%	RPG	APG	SPG	BPG	PPG
Ömer Aşık	66	2	14.7	.506	.000	.456	5.3	0.5	0.45	1.03	3.1
Carlos Boozer	66	66	29.5	.532	.000	.693	8.5	1.9	0.95	0.36	15.0
Ronnie Brewer	66	43	24.8	.427	.275	.560	3.5	2.1	1.09	0.32	6.9
Jimmy Butler	42	0	8.5	.405	.185	.768	1.3	0.3	0.26	0.12	2.6
Luol Deng	54	54	39.4	.412	.367	.770	6.5	2.9	1.04	0.67	15.3
Taj Gibson	63	0	20.4	.495	.000	.622	5.3	0.7	0.43	1.29	7.7
Richard Hamilton	28	28	24.9	.452	.370	.784	2.4	3.0	0.43	0.04	11.6
Mike James^{[a]}	11	0	10.9	.408	.600	.875	0.9	2.6	0.36	0.18	4.8
Kyle Korver	65	7	22.6	.432	.435	.833	2.4	1.7	0.55	0.23	8.1
John Lucas	49	2	14.8	.399	.393	.867	1.6	2.2	0.39	0.02	7.5
Joakim Noah	64	64	30.4	.508	.000	.748	9.8	2.5	0.64	1.44	10.2
Derrick Rose	39	39	35.3	.435	.312	.812	3.4	7.9	0.90	0.72	21.8
Brian Scalabrine	28	0	4.4	.467	.143	.500	0.8	0.5	0.18	0.21	1.1
C. J. Watson	49	25	23.7	.368	.393	.808	2.1	4.1	0.92	0.16	9.7

- ^{a} Statistics with the Chicago Bulls.

== Playoffs ==
=== Game log ===
2012 playoff game log
First round: 2–4 (home: 2–1; road: 0–3)

Game	Date	Team	Score	High points	High rebounds	High assists	Location Attendance	Series
1	April 28	Philadelphia	W 103–91	Derrick Rose (23)	Joakim Noah (13)	Derrick Rose (9)	United Center; 21,943	1–0
2	May 1	Philadelphia	L 92–109	Joakim Noah (21)	Joakim Noah (8)	Richard Hamilton; Joakim Noah (5)	United Center; 22,067	1–1
3	May 4	@ Philadelphia	L 74–79	Carlos Boozer (18)	Carlos Boozer (10)	Richard Hamilton (7)	Wells Fargo Center; 20,381	1–2
4	May 6	@ Philadelphia	L 82–89	Carlos Boozer (23)	Taj Gibson (12)	C.J. Watson; Carlos Boozer (4)	Wells Fargo Center; 20,412	1–3
5	May 8	Philadelphia	W 77–69	Luol Deng (24)	Carlos Boozer (13)	C.J. Watson (7)	United Center; 22,093	2–3
6	May 10	@ Philadelphia	L 78–79	Luol Deng, Richard Hamilton (19)	Luol Deng (17)	C. J. Watson (10)	Wells Fargo Center; 20,362	2–4

2012 playoff schedule

=== Playoff statistics ===
Chicago Bulls statistics
Player	GP	GS	MPG	FG%	3P%	FT%	RPG	APG	SPG	BPG	PPG
Ömer Aşık	6	3	21.3	.500		.353	4.7	1.3	.2	1.6	3.3
Carlos Boozer	6	6	33.3	.422		.714	9.8	3.0	.8	.3	13.5
Ronnie Brewer	5	0	16.6	.250		.000	3.8	1.8	.8	.2	1.6
Jimmy Butler	3	0	1.3				.0	.0	.0	.0	.0
Luol Deng	6	6	38.0	.456	.364	.571	8.3	1.5	.8	1.5	14.0
Taj Gibson	6	0	22.8	.457		.682	6.5	.7	.7	1.7	9.5
Richard Hamilton	6	6	28.5	.414	.333	.818	3.2	3.0	.2	.0	13.0
Kyle Korver	6	0	15.7	.409	.308	.500	1.7	1.5	.5	.5	3.8
John Lucas	5	0	18.8	.450	.385	1.000	1.4	1.8	.0	.0	8.6
Joakim Noah	3	3	15.0	.731		.636	9.3	3.0	.7	1.3	15.0
Derrick Rose	1	1	37.0	.391	.500	1.000	9.0	9.0	1.0	1.0	23.0
C. J. Watson	6	5	27.3	.241	.250	.750	2.2	5.5	.8	.0	7.3

== Awards, records and milestones ==
=== Awards ===
==== Week/Month ====
- On January 16, Derrick Rose was named Eastern Conference Player of the Week (January 9 – January 15)
- Coach Tom Thibodeau was named Coach of the Month for December–January.
- Coach Tom Thibodeau was named Eastern Conference Coach of the Month for March, 2012.

==== All-Star ====
- Derrick Rose was voted as an All-Star for the 3rd consecutive time, 2nd consecutive time as a starter.
- Luol Deng was voted as an All-Star reserve for the 1st time.
- Coach Tom Thibodeau was selected as Head Coach of the Eastern Conference All-Stars.

== Transactions ==
=== Overview ===
Players Added

Via draft

- Jimmy Butler

Via free agency

- Richard Hamilton
- Mike James
Players Lost

Via free agency

- Rasual Butler
- Kurt Thomas

Waived

- Keith Bogans
- Jannero Pargo

=== Trades ===
June 23, 2011	To Chicago Bulls Draft rights to Nikola Mirotić	To Minnesota Timberwolves Draft rights to Norris Cole; Draft rights to Malcolm Lee; Cash Considerations

=== Free agents ===
Additions
Player	Date signed	Former team
Richard Hamilton	December 14	Detroit Pistons
Mike James	April 5	Chicago Bulls

Subtractions
Player	Date signed	New team
Kurt Thomas	December 11	Portland Trail Blazers

Many players signed with teams from other leagues due to the 2011 NBA lockout. FIBA allows players under NBA contracts to sign and play for teams from other leagues if the contracts have opt-out clauses that allow the players to return to the NBA if the lockout ends. The Chinese Basketball Association, however, only allows its clubs to sign foreign free agents who could play for at least the entire season.

Played in other leagues during lockout
Player	Date signed	New team	Opt-out clause
Brian Scalabrine	September 22	Benetton Treviso (Italy)	No

== See also ==
- 2011–12 NBA season
