= 2010–11 Chicago Bulls season =

NBA professional basketball team season

- Division champions
- Head coach: Tom Thibodeau
- President: Michael Reinsdorf
- General manager: Gar Forman
- Owner: Jerry Reinsdorf
- Arena: United Center

Results
- Record: 62–20 (.756)
- Place: Division: 1st (Central); Conference: 1st (Eastern)
- Playoff finish: Eastern Conference Finals (lost to Heat 1–4)
- Stats at Basketball Reference

Local media
- Television: CSN Chicago (42 games); CSN Chicago Plus (5 games); WGN America (15 games); WGN (24 games); WCIU (7 games)
- Radio: WMVP

The 2010–11 Chicago Bulls season was the 45th season of the franchise in the National Basketball Association (NBA). Led by 22-year old guard Derrick Rose, the Bulls finished the season with a 62–20 record, the best in the league and first-place in the Central Division. They advanced to the Eastern Conference finals where they were eliminated by the Miami Heat team led by LeBron James, Dwyane Wade, and Chris Bosh in 5 games. Derrick Rose won the NBA Most Valuable Player Award, becoming the youngest NBA player ever to win the award, at the age of 22.

The Bulls won their 8th division title this season and finished with the best record in the NBA, but fell short to the Miami Heat in the Eastern Conference finals. It is the first time since 1975 that the Bulls failed to follow up a division title with an NBA title (that year, the Bulls were in the Midwest Division).

In the playoffs, the Bulls defeated the Indiana Pacers in five games in the First Round, defeated the Atlanta Hawks in six games in the semifinals, before losing to the Miami Heat in five games in the conference finals. The Heat would eventually lose 4–2 to the Dallas Mavericks in the NBA Finals, who won their first championship title.

To date, this playoff run is the deepest that the Bulls have advanced in the post-Michael Jordan era, and it is the only season since 1998 where they reached the conference finals.

== Key dates ==
- June 24 – The 2010 NBA draft took place in New York City.
- July 1 – The free agency period began.

== Summary ==
=== NBA draft ===
Round	Pick	Player	Position	Nationality	School/Club team
1	17	Kevin Séraphin	F/C	France	Cholet Basket (France)

=== Free agency ===
- Carlos Boozer
- Kyle Korver
- Ronnie Brewer
- Ömer Aşık
- Keith Bogans
- John Lucas III
- Brian Scalabrine
- Kurt Thomas
- C. J. Watson

== Roster ==
2010–11 Chicago Bulls roster
Players

Pos.	No.	Player	Height	Weight	DOB	From
C	3	Ömer Aşık	7 ft 0 in (2.13 m)	255 lb (116 kg)	1986-07-04	Turkey
G	6	Keith Bogans	6 ft 5 in (1.96 m)	215 lb (98 kg)	1980-05-12	Kentucky
F	5	Carlos Boozer	6 ft 9 in (2.06 m)	266 lb (121 kg)	1981-11-20	Duke
G	11	Ronnie Brewer	6 ft 7 in (2.01 m)	227 lb (103 kg)	1985-03-20	Arkansas
F	45	Rasual Butler	6 ft 7 in (2.01 m)	205 lb (93 kg)	1979-05-23	La Salle
F	9	Luol Deng	6 ft 9 in (2.06 m)	220 lb (100 kg)	1985-04-16	Duke
F	22	Taj Gibson	6 ft 9 in (2.06 m)	225 lb (102 kg)	1985-06-24	USC
F	26	Kyle Korver	6 ft 7 in (2.01 m)	212 lb (96 kg)	1981-03-17	Creighton
G	15	John Lucas III	6 ft 0 in (1.83 m)	180 lb (82 kg)	1982-11-21	Oklahoma State
C	13	Joakim Noah	6 ft 11 in (2.11 m)	232 lb (105 kg)	1985-02-25	Florida
G	12	Jannero Pargo	6 ft 1 in (1.85 m)	175 lb (79 kg)	1979-10-22	Arkansas
G	1	Derrick Rose	6 ft 3 in (1.91 m)	190 lb (86 kg)	1988-10-04	Memphis
F	24	Brian Scalabrine	6 ft 9 in (2.06 m)	235 lb (107 kg)	1978-03-18	USC
C	40	Kurt Thomas	6 ft 9 in (2.06 m)	230 lb (104 kg)	1972-10-04	TCU
G	32	C. J. Watson	6 ft 2 in (1.88 m)	175 lb (79 kg)	1984-04-17	Tennessee

Coaches
Head coach
- Tom Thibodeau
Assistant(s)
- Ron Adams
- Rick Brunson
- Andy Greer
- Adrian Griffin
- Ed Pinckney
- Mike Wilhelm
- Fred Tedeschi (trainer)

Legend
- (DP) Unsigned draft pick
- (FA) Free agent
- (S) Suspended
- Injured

Roster
Updated: March 20, 2011

== Pre-season ==
=== Game log ===
2010 pre-season game log
Pre-season: 4–4 (home: 3–1; road: 1–3)

Game	Date	Team	Score	High points	High rebounds	High assists	Location Attendance	Record
1	October 5	@ Milwaukee	L 83–92	Kyle Korver (22)	Joakim Noah (6)	C. J. Watson (6)	Bradley Center; 10,964	0–1
2	October 7	@ Dallas	L 83–88	Derrick Rose (17)	Joakim Noah (8)	Joakim Noah (6)	American Airlines Center; 17,448	0–2
3	October 8	Washington	W 107–96	Derrick Rose (18)	Joakim Noah (11)	Derrick Rose, Kyle Weaver, James Johnson (5)	United Center; 20,898	1–2
4	October 12	Toronto	W 109–90	Derrick Rose (23)	Joakim Noah (14)	Joakim Noah (8)	United Center; 20,165	2–2
5	October 15	Dallas	L 105–109 (OT)	Derrick Rose, Luol Deng (23)	Joakim Noah (15)	Joakim Noah (5)	United Center; 21,125	2–3
6	October 16	@ Orlando	L 67–105	C. J. Watson (13)	Brian Scalabrine, James Johnson (5)	C. J. Watson (4)	Amway Center; 18,846	2–4
7	October 20	@ Toronto	W 110–103	Luol Deng (22)	Ömer Aşık (9)	Derrick Rose (9)	Air Canada Centre; 12,681	3–4
8	October 22	Indiana	W 102–74	Luol Deng (29)	Ömer Aşık (10)	Derrick Rose (6)	United Center; 21,126	4–4

2010–11 season schedule

== Regular season ==
=== Standings ===
Central Division	W	L	PCT	GB	Home	Road	Div
z-Chicago Bulls	62	20	.756	–	36–5	26–15	15–1
x-Indiana Pacers	37	45	.451	25	24–17	13–28	9–7
Milwaukee Bucks	35	47	.427	27	22–19	13–28	6–10
Detroit Pistons	30	52	.366	32	21–20	9–32	7–9
Cleveland Cavaliers	19	63	.232	43	12–29	7–34	3–13

#	Eastern Conference				
#	Team	W	L	PCT	GB
1	z-Chicago Bulls	62	20	.756	–
2	y-Miami Heat	58	24	.707	4
3	y-Boston Celtics	56	26	.683	6
4	x-Orlando Magic	52	30	.634	10
5	x-Atlanta Hawks	44	38	.537	18
6	x-New York Knicks	42	40	.512	20
7	x-Philadelphia 76ers	41	41	.500	21
8	x-Indiana Pacers	37	45	.451	25
9	Milwaukee Bucks	35	47	.427	27
10	Charlotte Bobcats	34	48	.415	28
11	Detroit Pistons	30	52	.366	32
12	New Jersey Nets	24	58	.293	38
13	Washington Wizards	23	59	.280	39
14	Toronto Raptors	22	60	.268	40
15	Cleveland Cavaliers	19	63	.232	43

=== Game log ===
2010–11 game log
Total: 62–20 (home: 36–5; road: 26–15)
October: 1–1 (home: 1–0; road: 0–1)

Game	Date	Team	Score	High points	High rebounds	High assists	Location Attendance	Record
1	October 27	@ Oklahoma City	L 95–106	Derrick Rose (28)	Joakim Noah (19)	Derrick Rose (6)	Oklahoma City Arena; 18,203	0–1
2	October 30	Detroit	W 101–91	Derrick Rose (39)	Joakim Noah (17)	Derrick Rose (7)	United Center; 21,038	1–1

November: 8–5 (home: 4–1; road: 4–4)

Game	Date	Team	Score	High points	High rebounds	High assists	Location Attendance	Record
3	November 1	Portland	W 110–98	Luol Deng (40)	Joakim Noah (10)	Derrick Rose (13)	United Center; 21,057	2–1
4	November 4	New York	L 112–120	Derrick Rose (24)	Joakim Noah (13)	Derrick Rose (14)	United Center; 21,203	2–2
5	November 5	@ Boston	L 105–110 (OT)	Joakim Noah (26)	Joakim Noah (12)	Derrick Rose (9)	TD Garden; 18,624	2–3
6	November 8	Denver	W 94–92	Derrick Rose (18)	Joakim Noah (19)	Derrick Rose (6)	United Center; 21,355	3–3
7	November 11	Golden State	W 120–90	Luol Deng (26)	Luol Deng (11)	Derrick Rose (13)	United Center; 21,140	4–3
8	November 13	Washington	W 103–96	Derrick Rose (24)	Luol Deng (9)	Derrick Rose (8)	United Center; 21,610	5–3
9	November 16	@ Houston	W 95–92	Derrick Rose (33)	Luol Deng (10)	Derrick Rose (7)	Toyota Center; 18,158	6–3
10	November 17	@ San Antonio	L 94–103	Derrick Rose (33)	Joakim Noah (14)	Derrick Rose (4)	AT&T Center; 18,581	6–4
11	November 19	@ Dallas	W 88–83	Derrick Rose (22)	Taj Gibson (18)	Derrick Rose (6)	American Airlines Center; 20,133	7–4
12	November 23	@ L.A. Lakers	L 91–98	Derrick Rose (30)	Joakim Noah (13)	Derrick Rose (8)	Staples Center; 18,997	7–5
13	November 24	@ Phoenix	W 123–115 (2OT)	Derrick Rose (35)	Joakim Noah (15)	Derrick Rose (7)	US Airways Center; 18,422	8–5
14	November 26	@ Denver	L 97–98	C. J. Watson (33)	Joakim Noah (16)	Joakim Noah (4)	Pepsi Center; 19,155	8–6
15	November 27	@ Sacramento	W 96–85	Derrick Rose (30)	Ronnie Brewer (10)	Derrick Rose (7)	ARCO Arena; 13,504	9–6

December: 12–4 (home: 8–2; road: 4–2)

Game	Date	Team	Score	High points	High rebounds	High assists	Location Attendance	Record
16	December 1	Orlando	L 78–107	Joakim Noah (16)	Luol Deng, Taj Gibson (4)	Joakim Noah, Derrick Rose (4)	United Center; 21,435	9–7
17	December 3	@ Boston	L 92–104	Derrick Rose (20)	Joakim Noah (10)	Derrick Rose (8)	TD Garden; 18,624	9–8
18	December 4	Houston	W 119–116 (OT)	Derrick Rose (30)	Joakim Noah (12)	Derrick Rose (11)	United Center; 21,232	10–8
19	December 6	Oklahoma City	W 99–90	Carlos Boozer (29)	Carlos Boozer, Joakim Noah (12)	Derrick Rose (9)	United Center; 21,184	11–8
20	December 8	@ Cleveland	W 88–83	Derrick Rose (29)	Joakim Noah (14)	Derrick Rose (8)	Quicken Loans Arena; 20,562	12–8
21	December 10	L.A. Lakers	W 88–84	Derrick Rose (29)	Carlos Boozer (11)	Derrick Rose (9)	United Center; 22,760	13–8
22	December 11	Minnesota	W 113–82	Derrick Rose (21)	Taj Gibson, Joakim Noah (10)	Derrick Rose (7)	United Center; 21,102	14–8
23	December 13	Indiana	W 92–73	Carlos Boozer (22)	Carlos Boozer (18)	Derrick Rose (12)	United Center; 21,287	15–8
24	December 15	@ Toronto	W 110–93	Carlos Boozer (34)	Carlos Boozer (12)	Derrick Rose (11)	Air Canada Centre; 17,750	16–8
25	December 18	L.A. Clippers	L 99–100	Derrick Rose (34)	Luol Deng (8)	Derrick Rose (8)	United Center; 21,760	16–9
26	December 21	Philadelphia	W 121–76	Luol Deng, Derrick Rose (22)	Carlos Boozer (11)	Derrick Rose (12)	United Center; 21,521	17–9
27	December 22	@ Washington	W 87–80	Carlos Boozer (30)	Carlos Boozer (10)	Carlos Boozer (7)	Verizon Center; 18,011	18–9
28	December 25	@ New York	L 95–103	Carlos Boozer (26)	Carlos Boozer (19)	Derrick Rose (8)	Madison Square Garden; 19,763	18–10
29	December 26	@ Detroit	W 95–92 (OT)	Carlos Boozer (31)	Derrick Rose (12)	Derrick Rose (8)	The Palace of Auburn Hills; 20,765	19–10
30	December 28	Milwaukee	W 90–77	Carlos Boozer, Luol Deng (24)	Carlos Boozer (9)	Derrick Rose (12)	United Center; 22,091	20–10
31	December 31	New Jersey	W 90–81	Carlos Boozer (20)	Carlos Boozer (15)	Derrick Rose (9)	United Center; 21,792	21–10

January: 12–4 (home: 10–1; road: 2–3)

Game	Date	Team	Score	High points	High rebounds	High assists	Location Attendance	Record
32	January 1	Cleveland	W 100–91	Derrick Rose (28)	Kurt Thomas (13)	Derrick Rose (11)	United Center; 21,416	22–10
33	January 4	Toronto	W 111–91	Luol Deng (24)	Taj Gibson (14)	Derrick Rose (6)	United Center; 21,290	23–10
34	January 5	@ New Jersey	L 94–96	Derrick Rose (21)	Carlos Boozer (9)	Carlos Boozer (5)	Prudential Center; 15,025	23–11
35	January 7	@ Philadelphia	L 99–105	Carlos Boozer (31)	Carlos Boozer (13)	Derrick Rose (9)	Wells Fargo Center; 15,303	23–12
36	January 8	Boston	W 90–79	Derrick Rose (36)	Carlos Boozer (10)	Luol Deng (5)	United Center; 22,663	24–12
37	January 10	Detroit	W 95–82	Derrick Rose (29)	Carlos Boozer (11)	Derrick Rose (7)	United Center; 21,407	25–12
38	January 12	@ Charlotte	L 91–96	Carlos Boozer (23)	Carlos Boozer (14)	Derrick Rose (7)	Time Warner Cable Arena; 12,468	25–13
39	January 14	@ Indiana	W 99–86	Derrick Rose (29)	Kurt Thomas (18)	Ronnie Brewer, Luol Deng, Derrick Rose (5)	Conseco Fieldhouse; 18,165	26–13
40	January 15	Miami	W 99–96	Derrick Rose (34)	Carlos Boozer (10)	Derrick Rose (8)	United Center; 23,017	27–13
41	January 17	@ Memphis	W 96–84	Luol Deng (28)	Derrick Rose (10)	Derrick Rose (12)	FedExForum; 18,119	28–13
42	January 18	Charlotte	L 82–83	Derrick Rose (33)	Kurt Thomas (10)	Luol Deng, Derrick Rose (4)	United Center; 21,263	28–14
43	January 20	Dallas	W 82–77	Derrick Rose (26)	Luol Deng (12)	Derrick Rose (9)	United Center; 21,397	29–14
44	January 22	Cleveland	W 92–79	Derrick Rose (24)	Luol Deng (12)	Derrick Rose (8)	United Center; 21,389	30–14
45	January 24	Milwaukee	W 92–83	Kurt Thomas (22)	Carlos Boozer, Kurt Thomas (9)	Derrick Rose (10)	United Center; 21,126	31–14
46	January 28	Orlando	W 99–90	Luol Deng (26)	Carlos Boozer (16)	Derrick Rose (12)	United Center; 21,676	32–14
47	January 29	Indiana	W 110–89	Carlos Boozer (24)	Carlos Boozer (10)	Luol Deng (8)	United Center; 21,611	33–14

February: 8–3 (home: 3–0; road: 5–3)

Game	Date	Team	Score	High points	High rebounds	High assists	Location Attendance	Record
48	February 2	@ L.A. Clippers	W 106–88	Derrick Rose (32)	Taj Gibson (12)	Derrick Rose (11)	Staples Center; 19,368	34–14
49	February 5	@ Golden State	L 90–101	Carlos Boozer (21)	Carlos Boozer (10)	Derrick Rose (10)	Oracle Arena; 19,596	34–15
50	February 7	@ Portland	L 103–109	Derrick Rose (36)	Carlos Boozer (12)	Derrick Rose (6)	Rose Garden; 20,534	34–16
51	February 9	@ Utah	W 91–86	Derrick Rose (29)	Ömer Aşık, Luol Deng (7)	Derrick Rose (7)	EnergySolutions Arena; 19,911	35–16
52	February 12	@ New Orleans	W 97–88	Derrick Rose (23)	Ömer Aşık, Kurt Thomas (11)	Derrick Rose (6)	New Orleans Arena; 17,831	36–16
53	February 15	Charlotte	W 106–94	Luol Deng (24)	Carlos Boozer (9)	Derrick Rose (13)	United Center; 21,391	37–16
54	February 17	San Antonio	W 109–99	Derrick Rose (42)	Kurt Thomas (9)	Derrick Rose (8)	United Center; 22,172	38–16
All-Star Break
55	February 23	@ Toronto	L 113–118	Derrick Rose (32)	Joakim Noah (16)	Derrick Rose (10)	Air Canada Centre; 18,105	38–17
56	February 24	Miami	W 93–89	Derrick Rose (26)	Ömer Aşık (11)	Derrick Rose (6)	United Center; 23,024	39–17
57	February 26	@ Milwaukee	W 83–75	Luol Deng (19)	Joakim Noah (17)	Derrick Rose (4)	Bradley Center; 18,717	40–17
58	February 28	@ Washington	W 105–77	Luol Deng, Derrick Rose (21)	Joakim Noah (11)	Derrick Rose (9)	Verizon Center; 17,873	41–17

March: 13–3 (home: 6–1; road: 7–2)

Game	Date	Team	Score	High points	High rebounds	High assists	Location Attendance	Record
59	March 2	@ Atlanta	L 80–83	Luol Deng (15)	Joakim Noah (12)	Derrick Rose (12)	Philips Arena; 16,928	41–18
60	March 4	@ Orlando	W 89–81	Derrick Rose (24)	Ömer Aşık (13)	Ronnie Brewer, Derrick Rose (4)	Amway Center; 19,207	42–18
61	March 6	@ Miami	W 87–86	Derrick Rose (27)	Carlos Boozer (10)	Derrick Rose (5)	American Airlines Arena; 19,763	43–18
62	March 7	New Orleans	W 85–77	Derrick Rose (24)	Joakim Noah (13)	Derrick Rose (9)	United Center; 21,997	44–18
63	March 9	@ Charlotte	W 101–84	Kyle Korver, Derrick Rose (20)	Joakim Noah (13)	Derrick Rose, C. J. Watson (6)	Time Warner Cable Arena; 15,286	45–18
64	March 11	Atlanta	W 94–76	Derrick Rose (34)	Kurt Thomas (13)	Luol Deng (7)	United Center; 22,123	46–18
65	March 12	Utah	W 118–100	Luol Deng, Derrick Rose (26)	Joakim Noah, Kurt Thomas (9)	C. J. Watson (8)	United Center; 22,885	47–18
66	March 15	Washington	W 98–79	Derrick Rose (23)	Kurt Thomas (15)	Derrick Rose (7)	United Center; 22,103	48–18
67	March 17	@ New Jersey	W 84–73	Derrick Rose (21)	Ömer Aşık (16)	Joakim Noah (6)	Prudential Center; 18,351	49–18
68	March 18	@ Indiana	L 108–115 (OT)	Derrick Rose (42)	Taj Gibson (16)	Keith Bogans (3)	Conseco Fieldhouse; 18,165	49–19
69	March 21	Sacramento	W 132–92	Kyle Korver, Derrick Rose (18)	Joakim Noah (9)	Derrick Rose (8)	United Center; 21,873	50–19
70	March 22	@ Atlanta	W 114–81	Derrick Rose (30)	Taj Gibson (8)	Derrick Rose (10)	Philips Arena; 18,203	51–19
71	March 25	Memphis	W 99–96	Derrick Rose (24)	Carlos Boozer (9)	Derrick Rose (7)	United Center; 22,274	52–19
72	March 26	@ Milwaukee	W 95–87	Derrick Rose (30)	Carlos Boozer, Joakim Noah (11)	Derrick Rose (17)	Bradley Center; 18,717	53–19
73	March 28	Philadelphia	L 85–97	Derrick Rose (31)	Joakim Noah (13)	Derrick Rose (5)	United Center; 22,210	53–20
74	March 30	@ Minnesota	W 108–91	Carlos Boozer (24)	Carlos Boozer (14)	Derrick Rose (10)	Target Center; 19,207	54–20

April: 8–0 (home: 4–0; road: 4–0)

Game	Date	Team	Score	High points	High rebounds	High assists	Location Attendance	Record
75	April 1	@ Detroit	W 101–96	Derrick Rose (27)	Carlos Boozer, Kurt Thomas (8)	Carlos Boozer, Derrick Rose (7)	The Palace of Auburn Hills; 22,076	55–20
76	April 2	Toronto	W 113–106	Derrick Rose (36)	Carlos Boozer (10)	Derrick Rose (10)	United Center; 22,228	56–20
77	April 5	Phoenix	W 97–94	Derrick Rose (19)	Carlos Boozer, Taj Gibson (9)	Carlos Boozer (7)	United Center; 21,873	57–20
78	April 7	Boston	W 97–81	Derrick Rose (30)	Carlos Boozer (12)	Derrick Rose (8)	United Center; 23,067	58–20
79	April 8	@ Cleveland	W 93–82	Carlos Boozer (24)	Carlos Boozer (11)	Derrick Rose (8)	Quicken Loans Arena; 20,562	59–20
80	April 10	@ Orlando	W 102–99	Derrick Rose (39)	Taj Gibson (11)	Carlos Boozer (6)	Amway Center; 19,181	60–20
81	April 12	@ New York	W 103–90	Derrick Rose (26)	Carlos Boozer (22)	Carlos Boozer, Luol Deng (4)	Madison Square Garden; 19,763	61–20
82	April 13	New Jersey	W 97–92	Kyle Korver (19)	Joakim Noah (10)	C. J. Watson (6)	United Center; 22,420	62–20

2010–11 season schedule

== Playoffs ==
=== Game log ===
2011 playoff game log
First Round: 4–1 (home: 3–0; road: 1–1)

Game	Date	Team	Score	High points	High rebounds	High assists	Location Attendance	Series
1	April 16	Indiana	W 104–99	Derrick Rose (39)	Joakim Noah (11)	Derrick Rose (6)	United Center; 22,986	1–0
2	April 18	Indiana	W 96–90	Derrick Rose (36)	Carlos Boozer (16)	Derrick Rose (6)	United Center; 22,480	2–0
3	April 21	@ Indiana	W 88–84	Derrick Rose (23)	Carlos Boozer (11)	Luol Deng (6)	Conseco Fieldhouse; 18,165	3–0
4	April 23	@ Indiana	L 84–89	Joakim Noah (21)	Joakim Noah (14)	Derrick Rose (10)	Conseco Fieldhouse; 18,165	3–1
5	April 26	Indiana	W 116–89	Derrick Rose (25)	Joakim Noah (8)	Luol Deng, C. J. Watson (7)	United Center; 22,822	4–1

Conference Semifinals: 4–2 (home: 2–1; road: 2–1)

Game	Date	Team	Score	High points	High rebounds	High assists	Location Attendance	Series
1	May 2	Atlanta	L 95–103	Derrick Rose (24)	Joakim Noah (9)	Derrick Rose (10)	United Center; 22,890	0–1
2	May 4	Atlanta	W 86–73	Derrick Rose (25)	Joakim Noah (14)	Derrick Rose (10)	United Center; 22,872	1–1
3	May 6	@ Atlanta	W 99–82	Derrick Rose (44)	Joakim Noah (15)	Derrick Rose (7)	Philips Arena; 19,521	2–1
4	May 8	@ Atlanta	L 88–100	Derrick Rose (34)	Joakim Noah (11)	Derrick Rose (10)	Philips Arena; 19,263	2–2
5	May 10	Atlanta	W 95–83	Derrick Rose (33)	Carlos Boozer (12)	Derrick Rose (9)	United Center; 22,980	3–2
6	May 12	@ Atlanta	W 93–73	Carlos Boozer (23)	Carlos Boozer (10)	Derrick Rose (12)	Philips Arena; 19,378	4–2

Conference Finals: 1–4 (home: 1–2; road: 0–2)

Game	Date	Team	Score	High points	High rebounds	High assists	Location Attendance	Series
1	May 15	Miami	W 103–82	Derrick Rose (28)	Joakim Noah (14)	Derrick Rose (6)	United Center; 22,874	1–0
2	May 18	Miami	L 75–85	Derrick Rose (21)	Carlos Boozer, Joakim Noah (8)	Derrick Rose (8)	United Center; 23,007	1–1
3	May 22	@ Miami	L 85–96	Carlos Boozer (26)	Carlos Boozer (17)	Joakim Noah (6)	American Airlines Arena; 20,123	1–2
4	May 24	@ Miami	L 93–101 (OT)	Derrick Rose (23)	Joakim Noah (14)	Joakim Noah, Derrick Rose (6)	American Airlines Arena; 20,125	1–3
5	May 26	Miami	L 80–83	Derrick Rose (25)	Joakim Noah, Kurt Thomas (8)	Derrick Rose (8)	United Center; 23,057	1–4

2011 playoff schedule

== Player statistics ==
Legend
GP	Games played	GS	Games started	MPG	Minutes per game
FG%	Field-goal percentage	3P%	3-point field-goal percentage	FT%	Free-throw percentage
RPG	Rebounds per game	APG	Assists per game	SPG	Steals per game
BPG	Blocks per game	PPG	Points per game

=== Season ===
Player	GP	GS	MPG	FG%	3P%	FT%	RPG	APG	SPG	BPG	PPG
Ömer Aşık	82	0	12.1	.553	.0	.500	3.7	0.4	.24	.68	2.8
Keith Bogans	82	82	17.8	.404	.380	.660	1.8	1.2	.46	.11	4.4
Carlos Boozer	59	59	31.9	.510	.0	.700	9.6	2.5	.76	.31	17.5
Ronnie Brewer	81	1	22.2	.480	.222	.650	3.2	1.7	1.31	.27	6.2
Rasual Butler	6	0	4.3	.545	.571	.0	.2	.0	.0	.20	2.7
Luol Deng	82	82	39.1	.460	.345	.750	5.8	2.8	.95	.5.9	17.4
Taj Gibson	80	19	21.8	.466	.125	.680	5.7	0.7	.49	1.33	7.1
Kyle Korver	82	0	20.1	.435	.415	.89	1.8	1.5	.43	.24	8.3
Joakim Noah	48	48	32.8	.525	.0	.740	10.4	2.2	1.00	1.50	11.7
Derrick Rose	81	81	37.4	.445	.332	.858	4.1	7.7	1.05	.63	25.0
Kurt Thomas	52	37	22.7	.511	1.00	.630	5.8	1.2	.62	.81	4.1
C. J. Watson	82	1	13.3	.371	.393	.740	1.1	2.3	.67	.13	4.9

=== Playoffs ===
- The Bulls regular season record of 62–20 was the best in the NBA and assured the Bulls of home court advantage throughout the playoffs.

Player	GP	GS	MPG	FG%	3P%	FT%	RPG	APG	SPG	BPG	PPG
Ömer Aşık	15	0	9.9	.462	.0	.300	2.1	.1	.13	.53	1.0
Keith Bogans	16	16	19.2	.406	.424	.250	1.3	.8	.63	.19	5.1
Carlos Boozer	16	16	31.7	.433	.0	.800	9.7	1.8	.56	.44	12.6
Ronnie Brewer	16	0	16.3	.480	.429	.765	2.1	.9	.75	.38	4.0
Rasual Butler	3	0	2.3	1.000	1.000	.0	.3	.0	.0	.0	1.0
Luol Deng	16	16	42.9	.426	.324	.839	6.6	2.7	1.50	.63	16.9
Taj Gibson	16	0	17.8	.566	.000	.600	4.1	0.6	.31	1.38	5.9
Kyle Korver	16	0	17.3	.388	.423	1.000	1.2	1.1	.50	.19	6.6
Joakim Noah	16	16	33.1	.411	.0	.725	10.2	2.5	1.0	2.06	8.7
Derrick Rose	16	16	40.6	.396	.248	.828	4.3	7.7	1.38	.69	27.1
Kurt Thomas	7	0	10.6	.556	.000	.000	2.7	.4	.14	.43	2.9
C. J. Watson	16	0	8.5	.339	.200	.909	.9	1.9	.50	.0	3.2

== Awards, records and milestones ==
=== Awards ===
- Tom Thibodeau wins NBA Coach of the Year
- Derrick Rose is named NBA Most Valuable Player
- Gar Forman wins the NBA Executive of the Year Award, along with Miami Heat President Pat Riley.
- Derrick Rose made the All-NBA First Team
- Joakim Noah made the NBA All-Defensive Second Team

==== Week/Month ====
- On November 15, Derrick Rose was named Eastern Conference Player of the Week (November 8–14).
- Coach Tom Thibodeau was named Coach of the Month for January.
- Coach Tom Thibodeau was named Coach of the Month for March.
- Derrick Rose was named Player of the Month for March.

==== All-Star ====
- Derrick Rose was the starting point guard at the 2010–2011 NBA All-Star game. In just under 30 minutes of playing time, Rose scored 11 points with 3 rebounds, 5 assists, and 1 steal.

==== Season ====
- Luol Deng, a former winner (2006–2007) of the NBA Sportsmanship Award, finished second behind Stephen Curry of the Golden State Warriors for this year's award.

=== Records ===
- On March 12 the Bulls set a franchise record 18 converted 3-point shots in a game against the Utah Jazz. The previous record was 15 set in '94.
- Derrick Rose, at age 21, became the youngest MVP winner by winning this year's MVP title.

=== Milestones ===
Kurt Thomas played in his 1000th game in a contest vs the Charlotte Bobcats on Feb 15, 2011 at the United Center.

Derrick Rose scored a career high 44 pts vs the Atlanta Hawks on May 6, 2011.

Derrick Rose also had his first career triple-double at the Memphis Grizzlies on Jan 17, 2011.

The 62 wins by the Bulls is the most since the 97–98 season.

After defeating the New York Knicks on April 12, 2011, the Bulls became the only team of the 2010–2011 season to defeat all 29 other teams at least once.

Derrick Rose won 2010-11 NBA MVP and led his team to the Best NBA Regular Season Record without any All-Star teammates.

== Injuries and surgeries ==
- Carlos Boozer underwent surgery on October 5 to repair a fractured right hand. He claimed to have tripped over a bag at his home. After missing the first 15 games of the season, Boozer made his return on December 1 in a loss against the Orlando Magic.
- Joakim Noah underwent surgery on December 16 to repair a torn ligament in his right hand. He suffered the injury in a game against the Sacramento Kings on November 27. He returned to action in the 55th game of the season on February 23 after recuperating from right thumb surgery. He scored 7 points and had 16 rebounds in just over 24 minutes.
- Taj Gibson suffered a concussion in a game against the Los Angeles Clippers on December 18. He missed one game before suiting up for a game against the Washington Wizards on December 22, playing just 31 seconds.
- Carlos Boozer missed the January 17 game against the Memphis Grizzlies with a sprained ankle. He returned to play in the Jan 22 game against Cleveland.
- Carlos Boozer missed the March 11 game against the Atlanta Hawks with a sprained ankle. He missed 4 subsequent games and returned for the March 21 game against the Sacramento Kings
- Joakim Noah returned to the inactive list for games 74, 75 and 76.

== Transactions ==
=== Trades ===
July 8, 2010	To Chicago Bulls: Draft rights to Vladimir Veremeenko	To Washington Wizards: (United States) Kirk Hinrich No. 17 pick (Kevin Seraphin) cash considerations
July 8, 2010	To Chicago Bulls: (United States) Carlos Boozer Protected second-round pick	To Utah Jazz: Player exception
July 9, 2010	To Chicago Bulls: 2011 second-round pick	To Phoenix Suns: (United States) Hakim Warrick (sign and trade)
July 22, 2010	To Chicago Bulls: (United States) C. J. Watson (sign and trade)	To Golden State Warriors: 2011 second-round pick
February 22, 2011	To Chicago Bulls: 2011 first-round pick of Miami Heat	To Toronto Raptors: (United States) James Johnson

=== Free agents ===
==== Additions ====
Player	Signed	Former Team
Carlos Boozer	Signed 5-year contract for $80 Million	Utah Jazz
Kyle Korver	Signed 3-year contract for $15 Million	Utah Jazz
Ronnie Brewer	Signed 3-year contract for $12.5 Million	Memphis Grizzlies
C.J. Watson	Signed 2-year contract for $6.5 Million	Golden State Warriors
Kurt Thomas	Signed 1-year contract for $1.1 Million	Milwaukee Bucks
Ömer Aşık		(Turkey) Fenerbahçe Ülker
Keith Bogans	Signed 2-year contract for $2.5 Million	San Antonio Spurs
Brian Scalabrine	Undisclosed terms	Boston Celtics
Rasual Butler	Undisclosed terms	Los Angeles Clippers

==== Subtractions ====
Player	Reason Left	New Team
Rob Kurz	Waived	CB Granada
Chris Richard	Waived	N/A
Hakim Warrick	Free agent	Phoenix Suns
Brad Miller	Free agent	Houston Rockets
Jannero Pargo	Free agent	Chicago Bulls
Acie Law	Free agent	Golden State Warriors
Joe Alexander	Free agent	Texas Legends
John Lucas III	Waived	Chicago Bulls
