= Ronnie Brewer =

American basketball player (born 1985)

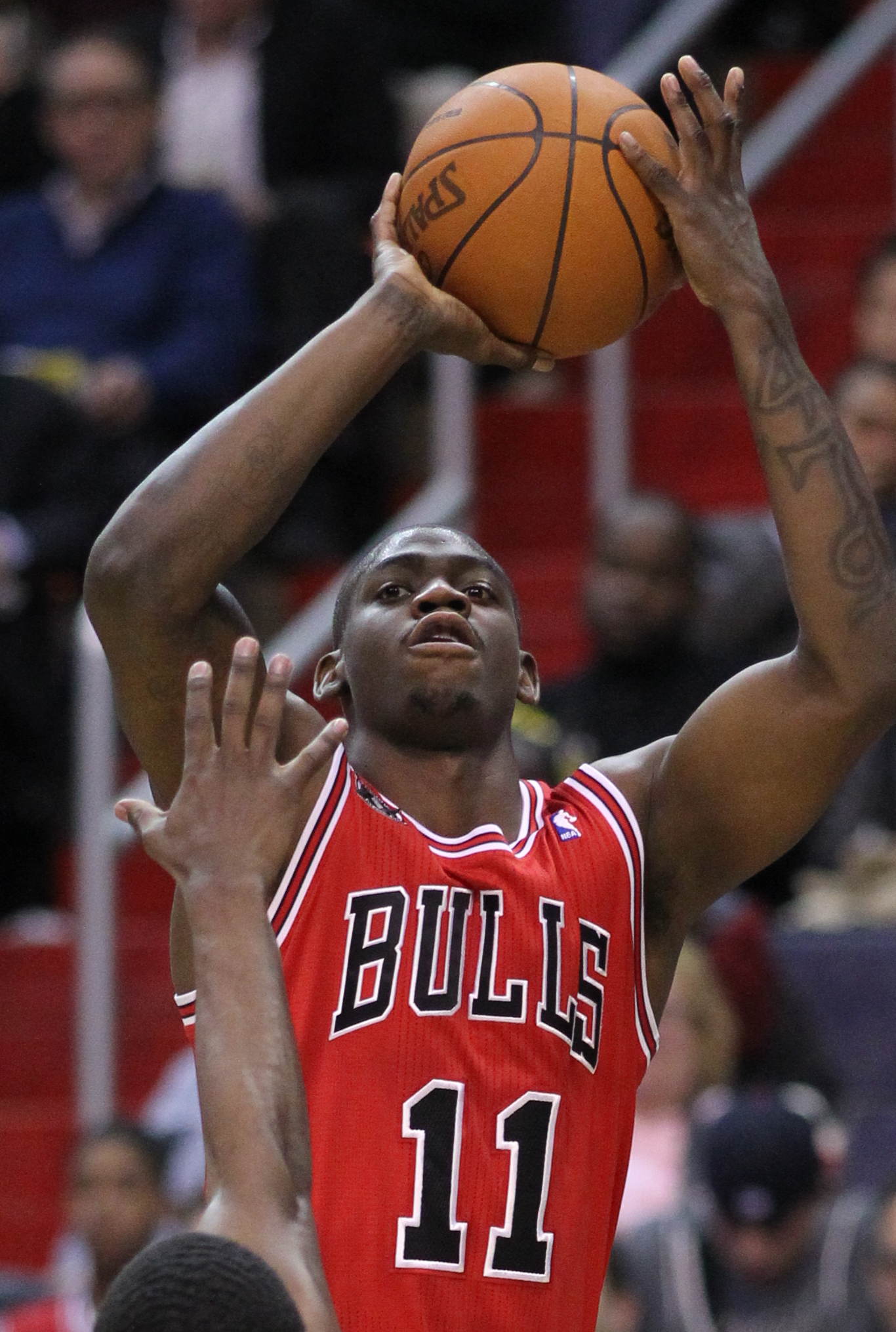
- Brewer with the Chicago Bulls in 2011

Arkansas Razorbacks
- Title: Assistant coach
- Conference: Southeastern Conference

Personal information
- Born: March 20, 1985 (age 41) Portland, Oregon, U.S.
- Listed height: 6 ft 7 in (2.01 m)
- Listed weight: 235 lb (107 kg)

Career information
- High school: Fayetteville (Fayetteville, Arkansas)
- College: Arkansas (2003–2006)
- NBA draft: 2006: 1st round, 14th overall pick
- Drafted by: Utah Jazz
- Playing career: 2006–2016
- Position: Shooting guard / small forward
- Number: 9, 11, 8, 10
- Coaching career: 2021–present

Career history

Playing
- 2006–2010: Utah Jazz
- 2010: Memphis Grizzlies
- 2010–2012: Chicago Bulls
- 2012–2013: New York Knicks
- 2013: Oklahoma City Thunder
- 2013–2014: Houston Rockets
- 2014: Chicago Bulls
- 2015–2016: Santa Cruz Warriors

Coaching
- 2021–2023: Arkansas (Recruiting Coordinator)
- 2023–present: Arkansas (assistant)

Career highlights
- 2× First-team All-SEC (2005, 2006); SEC All-Freshman Team (2004); Fourth-team Parade All-American (2003); Arkansas Mr. Basketball (2003)

Career NBA statistics
- Points: 3,940 (7.8 ppg)
- Rebounds: 1,427 (2.8 rpg)
- Assists: 828 (1.6 apg)
- Stats at NBA.com
- Stats at Basketball Reference

Ronnie Brewer (born March 20, 1985) is an American former professional basketball player and currently an assistant coach. Brewer played collegiately at the University of Arkansas, where his father Ron Brewer was a star in the late 1970s. Brewer is known for having an unorthodox shooting technique, the result of a childhood water slide injury.

The Utah Jazz selected him with the 14th pick of the 2006 NBA draft.

== College career ==
Brewer played at Arkansas from 2003 to 2006 where he averaged 18.4 points, 4.8 rebounds, 3.3 assists, 2.6 steals, and 0.5 blocks. He also was 51–151 from three-point range and shot 75% from the free-throw line.

== Professional career ==
=== Utah Jazz (2006–2010) ===
Brewer was selected with the 14th pick in the 2006 NBA draft by the Utah Jazz. Brewer saw very limited playing time in his 2006–07 rookie season with Utah, appearing in only 56 games. However, after a strong performance in the 2007–08 preseason, he assumed the role of Utah's starting shooting guard. By mid-November 2007, he was averaging double figures in points and was among the NBA leaders in steals. He was later selected to play in the 2008 Rookie-Sophomore Game. On February 28, 2009, Brewer recorded a career-high 26 points, along with 7 rebounds and 4 steals against the Sacramento Kings.

=== Memphis (2010) ===
On February 18, 2010, he was traded to the Memphis Grizzlies for a protected future first-round pick. His playing time declined late in the season due to a hamstring injury and the Grizzlies' fading playoff hopes.

=== Chicago Bulls (2010–2012) ===
On July 19, 2010, Brewer signed with the Chicago Bulls. In his first season with the Bulls, Brewer played back up shooting guard, averaged 22 minutes per game, and was among the league leaders in defensive efficiency.

On July 10, 2012, the Bulls declined Brewer's option for the next season, along with teammate C.J. Watson's option.

=== New York Knicks (2012–2013) ===
On July 25, 2012, Brewer signed with the New York Knicks.

On September 7, 2012, it was announced that Brewer would be out for six weeks after undergoing arthroscopic knee surgery.

=== Oklahoma City Thunder (2013) ===
On February 21, 2013, the Oklahoma City Thunder acquired Brewer from the New York Knicks in exchange for a 2014 second-round pick.

=== Houston Rockets (2013–2014) ===
On August 28, 2013, Brewer signed with the Houston Rockets. On February 21, 2014, he was waived by the Rockets.

=== Return to Chicago (2014) ===
On April 7, 2014, Brewer signed with the Chicago Bulls for the rest of the 2013–14 season. On July 15, 2014, he was waived by the Bulls.

=== Santa Cruz Warriors (2015–2016) ===
On October 31, 2015, Brewer was selected by the Santa Cruz Warriors in the second round of the 2015 NBA Development League Draft.

== NBA career statistics ==
Legend
GP	Games played	GS	Games started	MPG	Minutes per game
FG%	Field goal percentage	3P%	3-point field goal percentage	FT%	Free throw percentage
RPG	Rebounds per game	APG	Assists per game	SPG	Steals per game
BPG	Blocks per game	PPG	Points per game	**Bold**	Career high
*	Led the league

=== Regular season ===
Year	Team	GP	GS	MPG	FG%	3P%	FT%	RPG	APG	SPG	BPG	PPG
2006–07	Utah	56	14	12.1	.528	.000	.675	1.3	.4	.7	.1	4.6
2007–08	Utah	76	76	27.5	**.558**	.220	.759	2.9	1.8	**1.7**	.3	12.0
2008–09	Utah	**81**	**80**	**32.2**	.508	.259	.702	**3.7**	2.2	**1.7**	**.4**	**13.7**
2009–10	Utah	53	53	31.4	.495	.258	.633	3.4	**2.8**	1.6	.3	9.5
2009–10	Memphis	5	0	16.0	.231	.000	**.800**	1.4	.6	1.2	.0	2.0
2010–11	Chicago	**81**	1	22.0	.480	.222	.650	3.2	1.7	1.3	.3	6.2
2011–12	Chicago	66*	43	24.8	.427	.275	.560	3.5	2.1	1.1	.3	6.9
2012–13	New York	46	34	15.5	.366	**.310**	.410	2.2	.9	.7	.1	3.6
2012–13	Oklahoma City	14	0	10.1	.261	.200	.000	2.9	.7	.6	.0	.9
2013–14	Houston	23	3	6.9	.200	.125	.000	.6	.4	.3	.0	.3
2013–14	Chicago	1	0	2.0	.000	.000	.000	.0	.0	.0	.0	.0
Career		502	304	23.0	.490	.254	.675	2.8	1.6	1.2	.2	7.8

=== Playoffs ===
Year	Team	GP	GS	MPG	FG%	3P%	FT%	RPG	APG	SPG	BPG	PPG
2007	Utah	8	0	5.1	**.600**	.000	.538	.8	.3	.1	.0	2.4
2008	Utah	12	**12**	25.4	.520	.167	.760	3.2	1.6	1.0	.3	**10.2**
2009	Utah	5	5	**31.6**	.408	.000	.688	**4.6**	**2.6**	**1.4**	.2	**10.2**
2011	Chicago	**16**	0	16.3	.480	**.429**	**.765**	2.1	.9	.8	**.4**	4.0
2012	Chicago	5	0	16.6	.250	.000	.000	3.8	1.8	.8	.2	1.6
2013	Oklahoma City	1	0	8.0	.000	.000	.000	1.0	.0	.0	.0	.0
Career		47	17	18.2	.471	.267	.676	2.6	1.2	.8	.3	5.6

== The Basketball Tournament ==
Ronnie Brewer played for Team Arkansas in the 2018 edition of The Basketball Tournament. In 2 games, he averaged 8 points, 5 rebounds, and 1.5 blocks per game. Team Arkansas reached the second round before falling to the Talladega Knights.

== Coaching career ==
On July 20, 2021, Brewer was hired by his alma mater, the University of Arkansas, as the recruiting coordinator for the men's basketball team under head coach Eric Musselman. Prior to the start of the 2023–24 season, Brewer was promoted to assistant coach.

== Personal life ==
Brewer is cousins with Detroit rapper Guilty Simpson.

== See also ==
- List of second-generation NBA players
