= Kurt Thomas (basketball) =

American basketball player (born 1972)

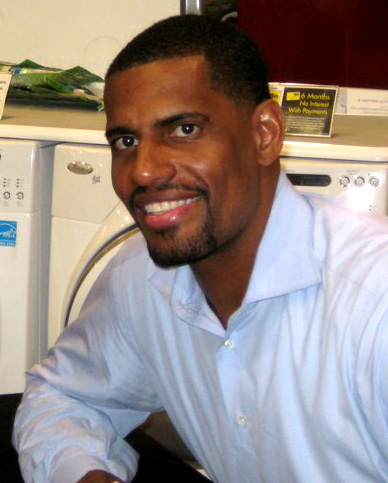
- Thomas in 2009

Personal information
- Born: October 4, 1972 (age 54) Dallas, Texas, U.S.
- Listed height: 6 ft 9 in (2.06 m)
- Listed weight: 240 lb (109 kg)

Career information
- High school: Hillcrest (Dallas, Texas)
- College: TCU (1990–1995)
- NBA draft: 1995: 1st round, 10th overall pick
- Drafted by: Miami Heat
- Playing career: 1995–2013
- Position: Power forward / center
- Number: 40, 44

Career history
- 1995–1997: Miami Heat
- 1997–1998: Dallas Mavericks
- 1999–2005: New York Knicks
- 2005–2007: Phoenix Suns
- 2007–2008: Seattle SuperSonics
- 2008–2009: San Antonio Spurs
- 2009–2010: Milwaukee Bucks
- 2010–2011: Chicago Bulls
- 2011–2012: Portland Trail Blazers
- 2012–2013: New York Knicks

Career highlights
- Third-team All-American – AP, NABC, UPI (1995); NCAA scoring champion (1995); NCAA rebounding leader (1995); SWC Player of the Year (1995); SWC Defensive Player of the Year (1995); 2x First-team All-SWC (1994, 1995); No. 40 Jersey retired by TCU Horned Frogs

Career statistics
- Points: 8,973 (8.1 ppg)
- Rebounds: 7,328 (6.6 rpg)
- Assists: 1,204 (1.1 apg)
- Stats at NBA.com
- Stats at Basketball Reference

Kurt Vincent Thomas (born October 4, 1972) is an American former professional basketball player. A 6'9", 230 lb. power forward-center, Thomas was known for his hard-nosed playing style and tough defense during his eight year tenure with the New York Knicks. Having played college basketball for the TCU Horned Frogs, he was selected by the Miami Heat in the 1995 NBA draft and went on to play parts of 18 seasons in the NBA.

== High school and college ==
Kurt began his basketball career on the playgrounds at Dallas Birdie Alexander Elementary, D.A. Hulcy Middle School, and thereafter on to Dallas Carter High before transferring to Hillcrest High. Thomas grew up in Dallas, and after graduating from Dallas's Hillcrest High School, he attended Texas Christian University, where he led the NCAA Division I in scoring and rebounding in the 1994–95 season with 28.9 PPG and 14.6 RPG, becoming only the third player in history to accomplish this feat (the other two being Hank Gathers and Xavier McDaniel).

== NBA career ==
=== Miami Heat (1995–1997) ===
Thomas began his NBA career with the Miami Heat from 1995 to 1997. In his rookie season, he started 42 of his 74 games played. On December 10, 1995, he set a then career high with 29 points, along with grabbing 15 rebounds, in a loss to the Sacramento Kings. The following season, he only played 18 games before suffering a stress fracture in his right ankle, which required surgery. He would miss the rest of the season. During his rehab, Thomas, along with Sasha Danilović and Martin Müürsepp, were traded to the Dallas Mavericks for Jamal Mashburn.

=== Dallas Mavericks (1997–1998) ===
Thomas's playing career with Dallas was short. He only played 5 games before suffering another stress fracture in the same ankle he had previously injured. This placed him on the injured list for the remainder of the season. Then-coach and general manager Don Nelson went out of his way to hire Thomas as an assistant coach. In the offseason, Thomas decided to become a free agent, signing with the New York Knicks.

=== New York Knicks (1999–2005) ===
Thomas played seven seasons with the New York Knicks from 1999 to 2005, during which the team went to the playoffs four times, including two trips to the Eastern Conference Finals (1999 and 2000) and one trip to the NBA Finals (1999). On March 28, 1999, Thomas was disqualified, and later fined $5,000, for a flagrant foul against Dennis Rodman during a 99–91 loss against the Los Angeles Lakers. In the 2001 NBA Playoffs, Thomas averaged 14.4 points and 11.2 rebounds while starting all five games in a 2–3 first round series loss against the Toronto Raptors. His best personal success perhaps came in the 2001-02 NBA season, where he started all 82 regular season games and averaged 13.2 points and 9.1 rebounds a game. Also during this season, and the following, Thomas scored a career high 33 points, on March 17, 2002 and then on November 8, 2002.

=== Phoenix Suns (2005–2007) ===
Thomas played two seasons with the Phoenix Suns from 2005 to 2007.

=== Seattle SuperSonics (2007–2008) ===
On July 20, 2007, Thomas, along with the Suns' first-round draft choices in 2008 and 2010 (which became Serge Ibaka and Quincy Pondexter), was traded by the Suns to the Seattle SuperSonics in exchange for a conditional second-round draft choice and an $8 million trade exception.

=== San Antonio Spurs (2008–2009) ===
Thomas was traded by the Sonics to the San Antonio Spurs on February 20, 2008, for Francisco Elson, Brent Barry, and a 2009 first-round draft pick.

=== Milwaukee Bucks (2009–2010) ===
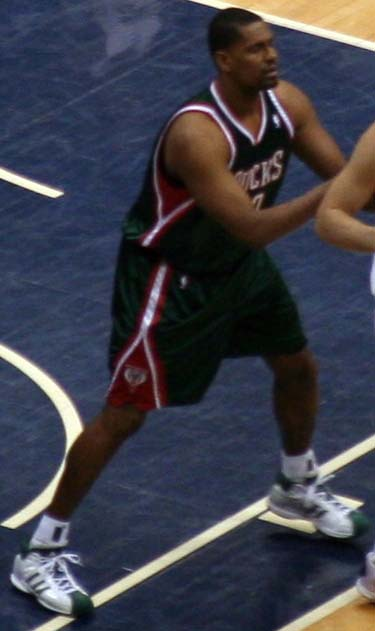
Thomas with the Milwaukee Bucks

On June 23, 2009, Thomas was traded along with Bruce Bowen and Fabricio Oberto to the Milwaukee Bucks for Richard Jefferson.

=== Chicago Bulls (2010–2011) ===
On July 26, 2010, the Chicago Bulls announced that they had signed Kurt Thomas. Because of injuries to the Bulls' starting center Joakim Noah and power forward Carlos Boozer, Kurt Thomas saw some significant playing time, including 37 starts. When Noah and Boozer came back, he experienced minimal playing time with Ömer Aşık playing in front of him on the bench. Although his playing time was slim during this span, Kurt Thomas won the appeal of Chicago fans with some emphatic highlights which were referred to as "Turning back the Clock" and eventually earned him the nickname "Big Sexy". Thomas averaged more than 20 minutes per game during the 2010–11 season along with 4.1 points and 5.8 rebounds.

=== Portland Trail Blazers (2011–2012) ===
On December 11, 2011, the Portland Trail Blazers signed Thomas for the shortened 2011–2012 season. Though terms for the deal were not disclosed officially, it was reported to be a two-year contract.

=== Return to the Knicks (2012–2013) ===
On July 16, 2012, Thomas and Raymond Felton were traded to the New York Knicks for Jared Jeffries, Dan Gadzuric, the rights to Kostas Papanikolaou and Giorgos Printezis, and a second round draft pick. On April 12, 2013, the Knicks waived Thomas.

== NBA career statistics ==
Legend
GP	Games played	GS	Games started	MPG	Minutes per game
FG%	Field goal percentage	3P%	3-point field goal percentage	FT%	Free throw percentage
RPG	Rebounds per game	APG	Assists per game	SPG	Steals per game
BPG	Blocks per game	PPG	Points per game	**Bold**	Career high
*	Led the league

=== Regular season ===
Year	Team	GP	GS	MPG	FG%	3P%	FT%	RPG	APG	SPG	BPG	PPG
1995–96	Miami	74	42	22.4	.501	.000	.663	5.9	.6	.6	.5	9.0
1996–97	Miami	18	9	20.8	.371	.000	.761	5.9	.5	.7	.5	6.3
1997–98	Dallas	5	0	14.6	.378	–	**1.000**	4.8	.6	.2	.0	7.4
1998–99	New York	50*	44	23.6	.462	.000	.611	5.7	1.1	.9	.3	8.1
1999–00	New York	80	21	24.6	.505	.333	.781	6.3	1.0	.6	.5	8.0
2000–01	New York	77	29	27.6	.511	.333	.814	6.7	.8	.8	.9	10.4
2001–02	New York	**82**	**82**	33.8	.494	.167	.815	9.1	1.1	.9	1.0	13.9
2002–03	New York	81	81	31.8	.483	.667	.750	7.9	**2.0**	**1.0**	**1.2**	**14.0**
2003–04	New York	80	75	31.9	.473	.000	.835	8.3	1.9	.7	1.0	11.1
2004–05	New York	80	80	**35.7**	.471	.500	.786	**10.4**	**2.0**	.9	1.0	11.5
2005–06	Phoenix	53	50	26.6	.486	–	.815	7.8	1.1	.4	1.0	8.6
2006–07	Phoenix	67	13	18.0	.486	.000	.789	5.7	.4	.4	.4	4.6
2007–08	Seattle	42	39	25.2	.513	–	.696	8.8	1.3	.8	1.0	7.5
2007–08	San Antonio	28	9	18.7	.448	.000	.583	4.9	.5	.8	.5	4.5
2008–09	San Antonio	79	10	17.8	.503	.000	.822	5.1	.8	.4	.7	4.3
2009–10	Milwaukee	70	9	15.0	.476	–	.800	4.2	.7	.4	.7	3.0
2010–11	Chicago	52	37	22.7	.511	**1.000**	.630	5.8	1.2	.6	.8	4.1
2011–12	Portland	53	3	15.2	.465	–	.700	3.5	.9	.5	.6	3.0
2012–13	New York	39	17	10.1	**.542**	**1.000**	.462	2.3	.5	.3	.4	2.5
Career		1110	650	24.5	.486	.281	.760	6.6	1.1	.7	.8	8.1

=== Playoffs ===
Year	Team	GP	GS	MPG	FG%	3P%	FT%	RPG	APG	SPG	BPG	PPG
1996	Miami	3	3	20.0	.400	–	**1.000**	5.3	1.0	.7	.3	4.0
1999	New York	**20**	**12**	21.0	.381	–	.696	5.5	.4	.8	.6	5.3
2000	New York	16	0	15.7	.508	–	.700	3.1	.3	.2	.4	4.3
2001	New York	5	5	**37.2**	.532	–	.710	11.2	**1.8**	.4	**1.0**	**14.4**
2004	New York	4	4	34.8	.429	–	.750	**11.5**	1.5	**1.8**	.8	12.8
2006	Phoenix	1	0	6.0	.000	–	.500	1.0	.0	.0	.0	1.0
2007	Phoenix	11	5	19.3	.523	–	.882	4.9	1.1	.5	.8	7.5
2008	San Antonio	17	8	15.8	.457	–	.714	4.9	.4	.1	.4	4.1
2009	San Antonio	5	0	16.0	.455	–	.750	4.6	.4	.2	.4	2.6
2010	Milwaukee	7	7	28.4	.486	–	.800	7.9	1.6	.4	.6	5.4
2011	Chicago	7	0	10.6	**.556**	.000	.000	2.7	.4	.1	.4	2.9
Career		96	44	19.7	.463	.000	.748	5.4	.7	.4	.5	5.6

== See also ==
- List of NCAA Division I men's basketball season rebounding leaders
- List of NCAA Division I men's basketball season scoring leaders
- List of NBA career personal fouls leaders
- List of oldest and youngest NBA players
