= John Lucas III =

American basketball player (born 1982)

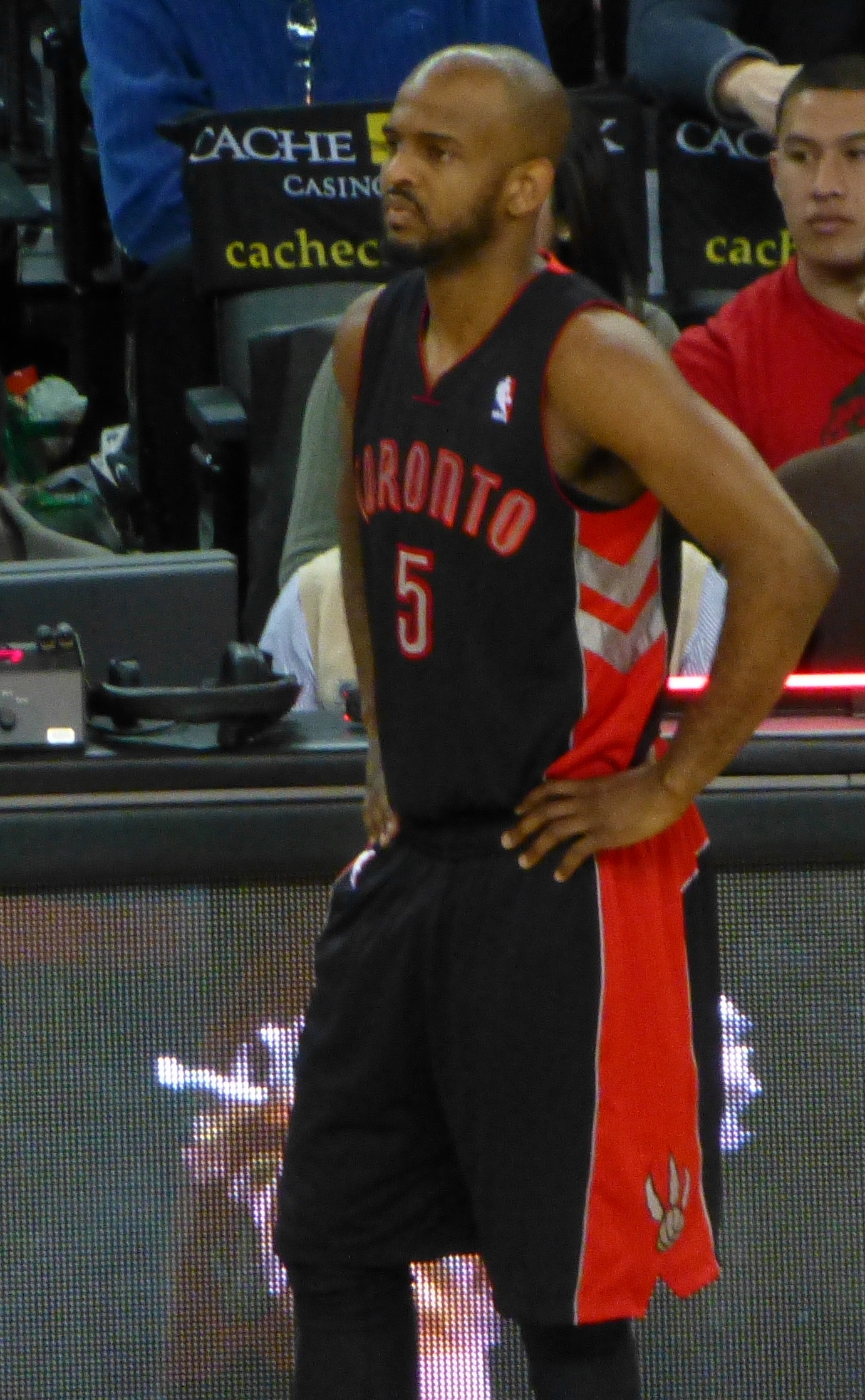
- Lucas with the Toronto Raptors in 2013

Las Vegas Aces
- Title: Player development coach
- League: WNBA

Personal information
- Born: November 21, 1982 (age 43) Washington, D.C., U.S.
- Listed height: 5 ft 11 in (1.80 m)
- Listed weight: 166 lb (75 kg)

Career information
- High school: Bellaire (Bellaire, Texas)
- College: Baylor (2001–2003); Oklahoma State (2003–2005)
- NBA draft: 2005: undrafted
- Playing career: 2005–2017
- Position: Point guard
- Number: 15, 5, 9, 11
- Coaching career: 2017–present

Career history

Playing
- 2005: Tulsa 66ers
- 2005–2006: Houston Rockets
- 2006: Tulsa 66ers
- 2006: Snaidero Udine
- 2006–2007: Houston Rockets
- 2008: Benetton Treviso
- 2009: Colorado 14ers
- 2009: TAU Cerámica
- 2009–2010: Shanghai Sharks
- 2010–2011: Chicago Bulls
- 2011: Shanghai Sharks
- 2011–2012: Chicago Bulls
- 2012–2013: Toronto Raptors
- 2013–2014: Utah Jazz
- 2014–2015: Fujian Sturgeons
- 2015: Detroit Pistons
- 2016: Fort Wayne Mad Ants
- 2016: Piratas de Quebradillas
- 2016–2017: Minnesota Timberwolves

Career highlights
- CBA All-Star (2010); NBA D-League champion (2009); All-NBA D-League Second Team (2006); Third-team All-American – AP (2004); 2× First-team All-Big 12 (2004, 2005); Big 12 All-Freshman Team (2002)

Career NBA statistics
- Points: 1,147 (4.7 ppg)
- Rebounds: 237 (1.0 rpg)
- Assists: 362 (1.5 apg)
- Stats at NBA.com
- Stats at Basketball Reference

John Harding Lucas III (born November 21, 1982) is an American professional basketball coach and former player who is currently serving as a player development coach for the Las Vegas Aces of the Women's National Basketball Association (WNBA). He played college basketball for Baylor and Oklahoma State.

== Early life ==
Born in Washington, D.C. to former NBA player and coach John Lucas II and his wife DeEdgra, Lucas lived in Wynnewood, Pennsylvania for a time as a youth. Lucas was the starting point guard on the Bellaire High School basketball team and played alongside fellow future NBA players Emeka Okafor and Lawrence Roberts. Lucas has a younger brother, Jai, who is the head coach of the men’s basketball team at the University of Miami.

He originally played collegiately at Baylor University, but transferred from there to Oklahoma State University in the wake of the 2003 Baylor basketball scandal. Lucas is noted for his winning shot against the Saint Joseph's University team that sent the 2004 Oklahoma State Cowboys to the NCAA Final Four.

== Professional career ==
After going undrafted in the 2005 NBA draft, Lucas joined the Minnesota Timberwolves for the 2005 NBA Summer League. The Timberwolves also signed him to their training camp roster. During the 2005–06 NBA season, Lucas was called up by the Houston Rockets from the Tulsa 66ers in December 2005. He played 13 games for the Rockets between December and February. Lucas's call-up made him the first Tulsa 66ers player to be called up from the NBA Development League. He averaged 16.6 points in 33.2 mins per game with the 66ers.

On May 10, 2006, Lucas signed with Snaidero Udine of the Italian League, to fill the gap left by Jerome Allen, who was out for the season due to injury.

On July 28, 2006, Lucas signed with the Rockets to a three-year contract. In the 2006–07 season, Lucas and the Rockets made it to the playoffs, where they lost to the Utah Jazz in the first round, in 7 games. On October 30, 2007, Lucas was one of four players cut from the Rockets' roster, prior to the commencement of the 2007–08 season.

He subsequently returned to Italian basketball, joining Benetton Treviso in January 2008. He was then later released by Treviso in March. Lucas was signed by the Oklahoma City Thunder in September 2008 but was released by them in November before playing in any NBA games for them. In February 2009, he signed with the Colorado 14ers and helped them go on to win the 2008–09 D-League championship. On April 27, 2009, Lucas signed with TAU Cerámica of the Spanish ACB League for the remainder of the season.

On September 2, 2009, Lucas was drafted by the Maine Red Claws in the NBA Development League expansion draft.

Lucas played in the 2009 NBA preseason for the Miami Heat. He played four games and averaged 7.0 points, 2.3 assists and 1.3 rebounds in 12.5 minutes per game. On October 23, 2009, Lucas was waived by the Heat.

Lucas then spent the 2009–10 season with the Shanghai Sharks of the CBA.

Lucas spent the 2010 NBA preseason with the Chicago Bulls but was waived on October 21. The Bulls re-signed him on November 26. In his debut for the Bulls, Lucas missed two critical free throws in the final seconds of a 98–97 loss to the Denver Nuggets. He was waived on January 4, 2011, and signed with the Shanghai Sharks in China. After his 2-month China stint, he returned to America and re-signed with the Bulls on March 20, 2011. On January 11, 2012, Lucas received his first-ever NBA start and achieved a career-high of 25 points, leading the Bulls in a 78–64 win over the Washington Wizards. He also played 45 minutes, made 11 of 28 field goal attempts, and had 8 assists and 8 rebounds (all career-highs).

On March 14, 2012, the Bulls hosted the Miami Heat. The Bulls were missing Derrick Rose, who was out due to a groin injury. Lucas scored 24 points and led the Chicago Bulls to a 106–102 victory over the Miami Heat.

On March 21, 2012, Lucas led the Bulls to a comeback victory over the Toronto Raptors, scoring all of his 13 points in the 4th quarter.

On July 27, 2012, Lucas signed with the Toronto Raptors.

On July 22, 2013, Lucas signed with the Utah Jazz.

On July 22, 2014, Lucas was traded, along with Erik Murphy and Malcolm Thomas, to the Cleveland Cavaliers in exchange for Carrick Felix, a 2015 second round draft pick and cash considerations. On September 25, 2014, he was traded, along with Erik Murphy, Dwight Powell, Malcolm Thomas and the Cavaliers' 2016 and 2017 second-round picks, to the Boston Celtics in exchange for Keith Bogans and two future second-round picks. Four days later, he was waived by the Celtics.

On October 21, 2014, Lucas signed with the Washington Wizards. Four days later, he was waived by the Wizards. On November 21, 2014, he signed with the Fujian Sturgeons for the rest of the 2014–15 CBA season. His final game for Fujian came on January 30, 2015, and left China having averaged 26.3 points, 7.0 assists and 4.6 rebounds over 28 games. On February 2, he signed a 10-day contract with the Detroit Pistons. On February 12, he signed a second 10-day contract with the Pistons. On February 25, he signed with the Pistons for the rest of the season.

On September 28, 2015, Lucas signed with the Miami Heat. However, he was later waived by the Heat on October 24 after appearing in one preseason game. On January 14, 2016, Lucas was acquired by the Fort Wayne Mad Ants of the NBA Development League. One day later, he made his debut in a 109–104 loss to the Sioux Falls Skyforce, recording 21 points, 6 rebounds, 6 assists and three steals in 32 minutes of action. On March 6, he was waived by the Mad Ants after averaging 17.7 points per game in 18 games. On March 17, he signed with Piratas de Quebradillas of the Puerto Rican League.

On September 26, 2016, Lucas signed with the Minnesota Timberwolves. On January 7, 2017, he was waived by the Timberwolves after appearing in five games.

== NBA career statistics ==
Legend
GP	Games played	GS	Games started	MPG	Minutes per game
FG%	Field goal percentage	3P%	3-point field goal percentage	FT%	Free throw percentage
RPG	Rebounds per game	APG	Assists per game	SPG	Steals per game
BPG	Blocks per game	PPG	Points per game	**Bold**	Career high

=== Regular season ===
Year	Team	GP	GS	MPG	FG%	3P%	FT%	RPG	APG	SPG	BPG	PPG
2005–06	Houston	13	0	8.2	.389	.222	.000	.4	.9	**.4**	.0	2.3
2006–07	Houston	47	0	8.1	.397	.254	.789	.8	.7	**.4**	.0	3.3
2010–11	Chicago	2	0	5.0	.333	.000	.000	.0	.5	.0	.0	1.0
2011–12	Chicago	49	2	**14.8**	.399	**.393**	.875	**1.6**	2.2	**.4**	.0	**7.5**
2012–13	Toronto	**63**	0	13.1	.386	.377	.720	1.0	1.7	**.4**	.0	5.3
2013–14	Utah	42	**6**	14.1	.326	.298	.625	.9	1.0	.3	.0	3.8
2014–15	Detroit	21	0	13.0	**.404**	.310	**1.000**	.8	**2.9**	**.4**	.0	4.7
2016–17	Minnesota	5	0	2.2	.250	.000	.000	.0	0.2	**.4**	.0	0.4
Career		242	8	12.1	.383	.344	.768	1.0	1.5	.4	.0	4.7

=== Playoffs ===
Year	Team	GP	GS	MPG	FG%	3P%	FT%	RPG	APG	SPG	BPG	PPG
2007	Houston	2	0	4.0	.000	.000	.000	.0	.0	**.5**	.0	0.0
2012	Chicago	**5**	0	**18.8**	**.450**	**.385**	**1.000**	**1.4**	**1.8**	.0	.0	**8.3**
Career		7	0	14.6	.439	.397	1.000	1.0	1.3	.1	.0	6.1

== Coaching career ==
On September 21, 2017, the Minnesota Timberwolves announced additions to their coaching staff for the 2017–18 season while Lucas was named as Player Development Coach.

On September 15, 2021, the Los Angeles Lakers announced that they had hired Lucas as assistant coach. On June 7, 2022, he was let go as new Lakers coach Darvin Ham formed his staff.

On June 17, 2023, it was reported that Lucas was hired as an assistant coach for the Phoenix Suns under head coach Frank Vogel. The hiring, alongside the rest of the Suns' newest coaching staff, was made official on June 21, 2023. Lucas would later be fired alongside the rest of Frank Vogel's coaching staff (outside of David Fizdale) on May 12, 2024, following the replacement of Vogel with Mike Budenholzer.
