= C. J. Watson =

American basketball player (born 1984)

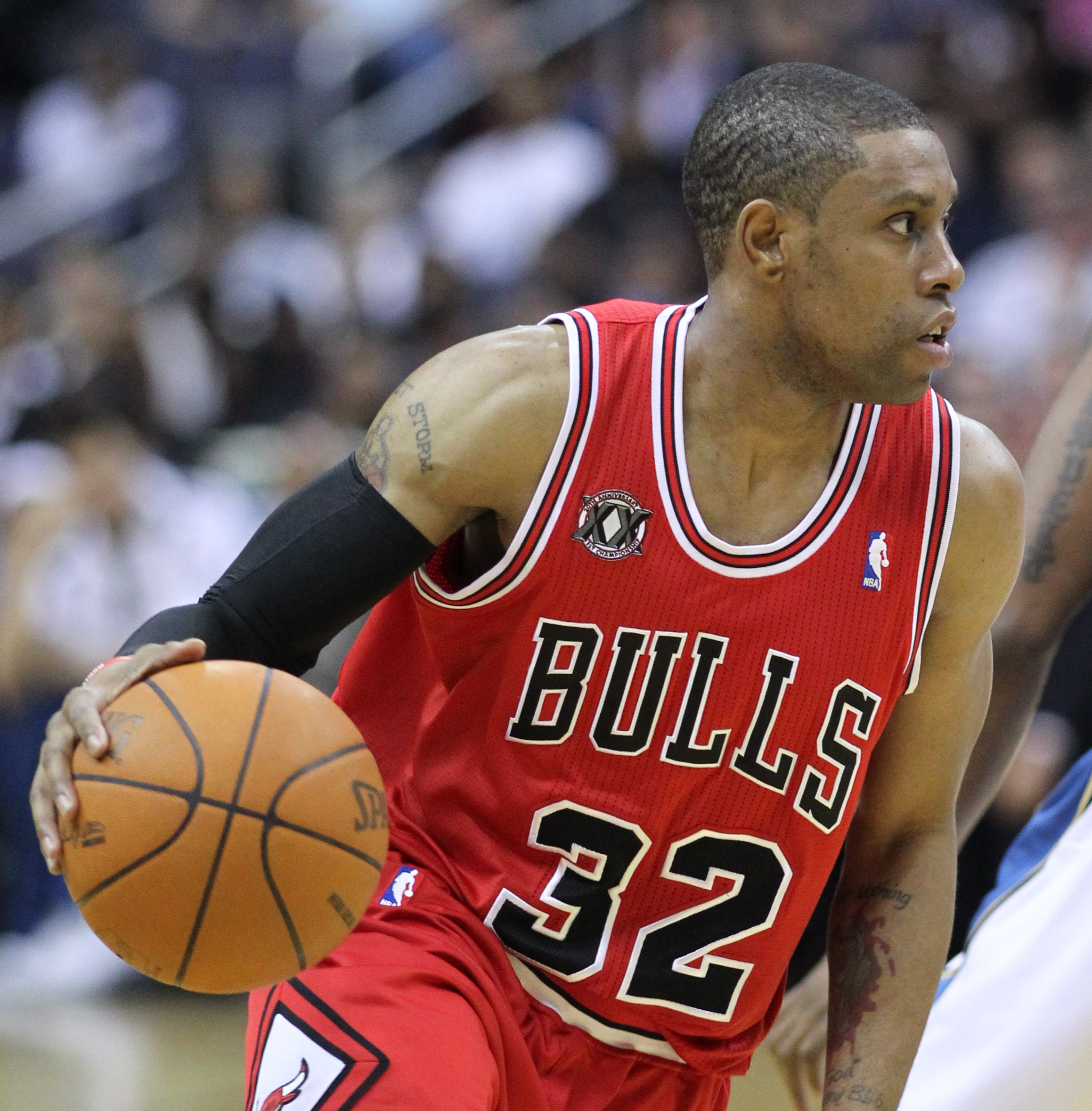
- Watson with the Chicago Bulls in 2011

Personal information
- Born: April 17, 1984 (age 42) Las Vegas, Nevada, U.S.
- Listed height: 6 ft 2 in (1.88 m)
- Listed weight: 175 lb (79 kg)

Career information
- High school: Bishop Gorman (Las Vegas, Nevada)
- College: Tennessee (2002–2006)
- NBA draft: 2006: undrafted
- Playing career: 2006–2019
- Position: Point guard
- Number: 4, 23, 32, 7, 1

Career history
- 2006–2007: Pallacanestro Reggiana
- 2007: PAOK Thessaloniki
- 2007–2008: Rio Grande Valley Vipers
- 2008–2010: Golden State Warriors
- 2010–2012: Chicago Bulls
- 2012–2013: Brooklyn Nets
- 2013–2015: Indiana Pacers
- 2015–2017: Orlando Magic
- 2018–2019: Uşak Sportif

Career highlights
- Second-team All-SEC (2006); SEC All-Freshman Team (2003); Fourth-team Parade All-American (2002)
- Stats at NBA.com
- Stats at Basketball Reference

Charles "C. J." Akeem Watson Jr. (born April 17, 1984) is an American former professional basketball player. He played college basketball for the Tennessee Volunteers.

== College career ==
Watson played for the Tennessee Volunteers for four seasons. During his freshman season, he earned SEC All-Freshman Team honors. His best season came during his senior year in 2005–06, where he and fellow All-American Chris Lofton led the Volunteers to a 22–8 record and a 12–4 record in SEC play. He averaged 15.3 points, 3.9 assists and 3.1 rebounds, and earned second-team All-SEC honors from the Associated Press and the league coaches. He finished his collegiate career as Tennessee's second all-time leader in assists (577), second in steals (198), sixth in three-point field goal percentage (.396), tied for eighth in three-point field goals (401), and 15th in scoring (1,424 points).

== Professional career ==
=== European career (2006–2007) ===
Despite an excellent college career, Watson went undrafted in 2006 NBA draft. He then played briefly with San Antonio Spurs in 2006 NBA summer league before joining Italian Serie A team Bipop Carire Reggio Emilia. He averaged 8.5 points and 2.3 rebounds in 17 games. He then moved on to join Greek A1 Ethniki team PAOK B.C., where he averaged 7.4 points and 2.2 assists in five games.

=== D-League career (2007–2008) ===
Watson returned to the states to revive his NBA career, participated in 2007 NBA summer league with the Spurs and later joined the Charlotte Bobcats' training camp. However, he once again failed to make the roster for the season. On November 1, 2007, he joined NBA D-League and was drafted 5th overall by the Rio Grande Valley Vipers. He averaged 26.4 points, 5.3 rebounds, 5.3 assists and 1.38 steals in 38.1 minutes per game for the Vipers before signed by Golden State Warriors on January 8, 2008. At the time of the call-up, Watson was the third-leading scorer in the D-League. He also became the 100th player to be called up by an NBA team in D-League history.

=== Golden State Warriors (2008–2010) ===
On January 8, 2008, Golden State Warriors signed Watson to a 10-day contract to be a backup point guard to All-Star Baron Davis. He impressed Warriors coach Don Nelson and subsequently earned a second 10-day contract. After two 10-day contracts, where he appeared in 8 games, averaging 5.4 points and 1.8 assists in 16.6 minutes, Watson was signed for the remainder of the season. On February 17, 2010, Watson scored a career-high 40 points against the Sacramento Kings with 16-of-23 shooting.

=== Chicago Bulls (2010–2012) ===
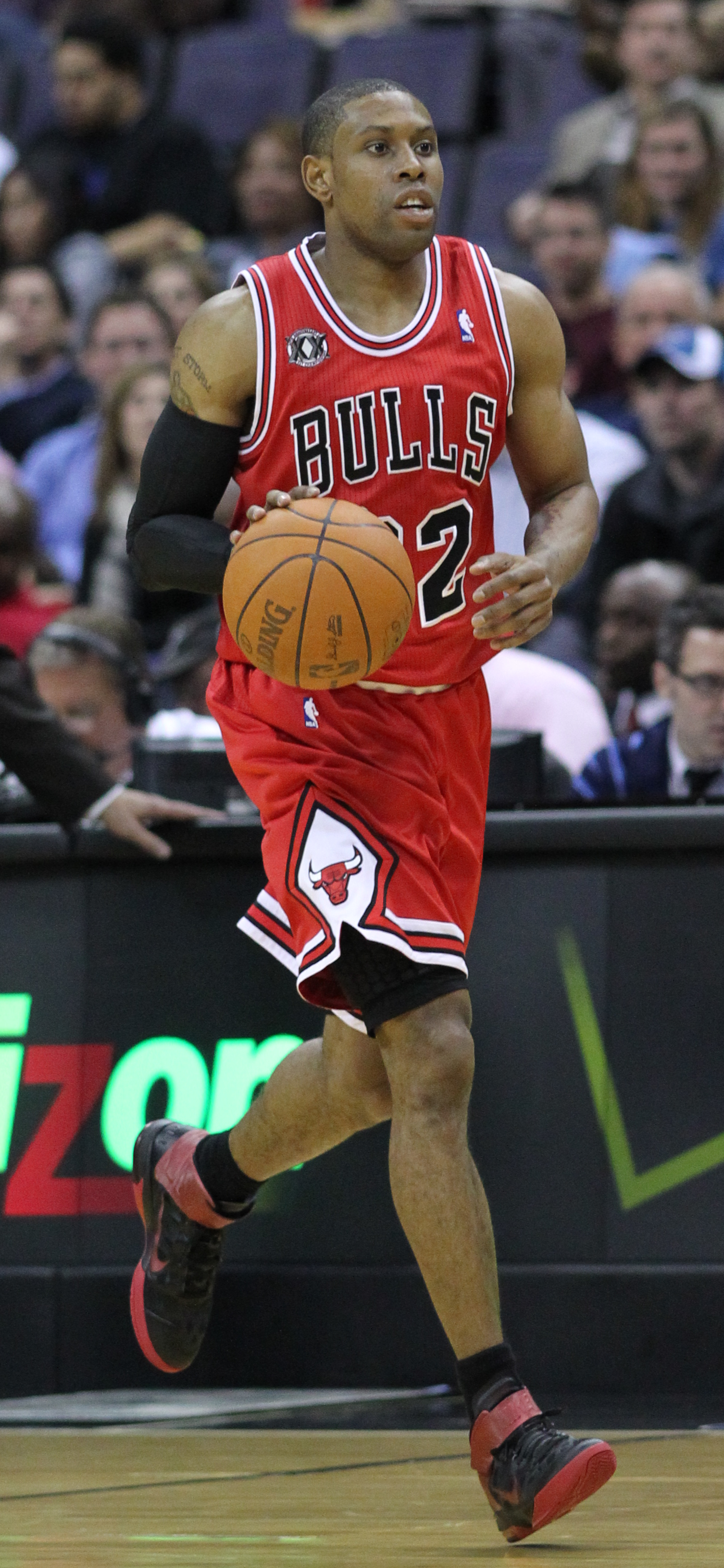
Watson in a game with the Bulls in 2011

On July 21, 2010, Watson was acquired in a sign and trade deal by the Chicago Bulls, signing a 3-year, $10.2 million contract. On November 26, 2010, the Bulls' starting point guard Derrick Rose was out with a stiff neck. Watson started against the Denver Nuggets and scored a season-high 33 points in a loss, while also shooting 50% from the field. On December 14, 2011, Watson changed his number from 32 to 7 because of Richard "Rip" Hamilton signing with the Bulls. On April 28, 2012, in the Bulls' first game of that year's playoffs, guard Derrick Rose suffered a torn ACL in his left knee. In his absence, Watson started the rest of the Bulls' playoff games. The Bulls lost in the first round to the Philadelphia 76ers. Watson averaged 7.3 points on 24% shooting in the series.

=== Brooklyn Nets (2012–2013) ===
On July 23, 2012, Watson signed with the Brooklyn Nets. On February 13, 2013, he scored a season-high 25 points in the 119–108 win over the Denver Nuggets. His 25 points were the most he'd scored since November 2010, and his five three-pointers also set a career high. Watson averaged 6.8 points in 80 regular season games for the Nets as a backup point guard to Deron Williams. In the Nets' seven playoff games, he averaged 8.6 points per game.

=== Indiana Pacers (2013–2015) ===
On July 10, 2013, Watson signed with the Indiana Pacers. On April 13, 2014, he scored a season-high 20 points in the 102–97 win over the Oklahoma City Thunder. In his first season with Indiana, Watson averaged 6.6 points in 63 regular season games as a backup point guard to George Hill. In 18 playoff games, Watson averaged 5.8 points per game.

=== Orlando Magic (2015–2017) ===
On July 9, 2015, Watson signed with the Orlando Magic. On February 19, 2016, he played in his first game for the Magic since November 9, 2015, due to a left calf injury.

On July 10, 2017, Watson was waived by the Magic.

=== Turkey (2018–2019) ===
On February 17, 2018, Watson signed with Uşak Sportif of the Turkish Super League.

== Personal life ==
Watson majored in psychology at Tennessee and continued working toward his degree every summer after starting his professional basketball career. He completed his coursework in 2012. He has one brother, Kashif, who played college basketball for the University of Idaho, and one sister, Vonyetta.

== NBA career statistics ==
Legend
GP	Games played	GS	Games started	MPG	Minutes per game
FG%	Field goal percentage	3P%	3-point field goal percentage	FT%	Free throw percentage
RPG	Rebounds per game	APG	Assists per game	SPG	Steals per game
BPG	Blocks per game	PPG	Points per game	**Bold**	Career high

=== Regular season ===
Year	Team	GP	GS	MPG	FG%	3P%	FT%	RPG	APG	SPG	BPG	PPG
2007–08	Golden State	32	0	11.5	.426	.346	.793	1.0	1.1	.5	.0	3.7
2008–09	Golden State	77	18	24.5	.457	.400	.870	2.5	2.7	1.2	.1	9.5
2009–10	Golden State	65	15	**27.5**	**.468**	.310	.771	2.6	2.8	**1.6**	.1	**10.3**
2010–11	Chicago	**82**	1	13.3	.371	.393	.740	1.1	2.3	.7	.1	4.9
2011–12	Chicago	49	**25**	23.7	.368	.393	.808	1.0	**4.1**	.9	**.2**	9.7
2012–13	Brooklyn	80	8	19.0	.418	**.411**	.780	1.8	2.0	.8	**.2**	6.8
2013–14	Indiana	63	5	18.9	.437	.366	.784	1.6	1.7	1.0	.1	6.6
2014–15	Indiana	57	21	24.9	.434	.400	.826	**2.9**	3.6	1.0	**.2**	10.0
2015–16	Orlando	33	2	19.9	.343	.292	**.872**	2.0	2.7	.6	**.2**	4.3
2016–17	Orlando	62	9	16.3	.387	.305	.864	1.4	1.8	.7	.0	4.5
Career		600	104	20.2	.419	.373	.812	1.9	2.5	.9	.1	7.2

=== Playoffs ===
Year	Team	GP	GS	MPG	FG%	3P%	FT%	RPG	APG	SPG	BPG	PPG
2011	Chicago	16	0	8.5	.339	.200	**.909**	.9	1.9	.5	.0	3.2
2012	Chicago	6	**5**	**27.3**	.241	.250	.750	2.2	**5.5**	**.8**	.0	7.3
2013	Brooklyn	7	0	23.0	**.436**	.267	.667	**2.4**	1.9	.7	**.1**	**8.6**
2014	Indiana	**19**	0	18.0	.411	**.400**	.607	2.1	.9	.8	**.1**	5.6
Career		48	5	16.7	.363	.314	.701	1.8	2.0	.7	.0	5.5
