= Ömer Aşık =

Turkish basketball player (born 1986)

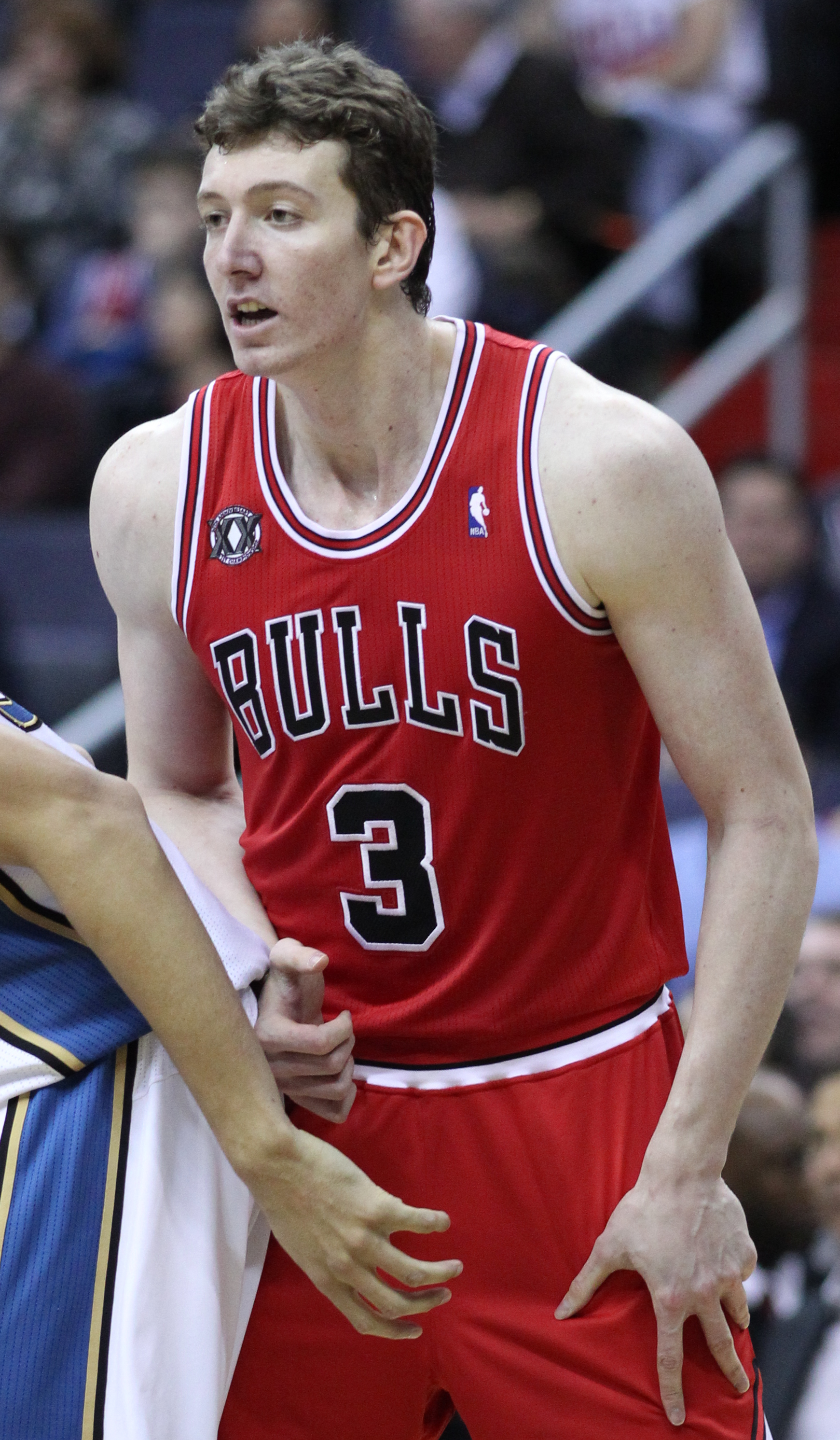
- Aşık with the Chicago Bulls in 2011

Personal information
- Born: July 4, 1986 (age 40) Bursa, Turkey
- Listed height: 7 ft 0 in (2.13 m)
- Listed weight: 255 lb (116 kg)

Career information
- NBA draft: 2008: 2nd round, 36th overall pick
- Drafted by: Portland Trail Blazers
- Playing career: 2005–2018
- Position: Center
- Number: 3, 12, 14, 24

Career history
- 2005–2006: Fenerbahçe
- 2005–2006: →FMV Işık Spor Kulübü
- 2006–2007: Alpella
- 2007–2010: Fenerbahçe
- 2010–2012: Chicago Bulls
- 2012–2014: Houston Rockets
- 2014–2018: New Orleans Pelicans
- 2018: Chicago Bulls

Career highlights
- 2× TBL champion (2008, 2010); 2× TBL All-Star (2007, 2008)
- Stats at NBA.com
- Stats at Basketball Reference

Ömer Faruk Aşık (Turkish pronunciation: [œmæɾ aːʃɯk]; born July 4, 1986) is a Turkish former professional basketball player who played in the National Basketball Association (NBA) and other leagues. A center standing at 7 ft 0 in (2.13 m), Aşık was sought after by many of the top Euroleague basketball teams at the age of 19. He got his first chance playing professionally with the Turkish Basketball League team Fenerbahçe in 2005–06. After one season with Alpella, Aşık moved back to Fenerbahçe and eventually ended his Turkish club career with them in 2009–10. He gained recognition playing for the Turkey national team at the 2010 FIBA World Championship, and as the starting center, he helped Turkey win the silver medal. In July 2010, Aşık signed with the Chicago Bulls. He was nicknamed "The Turkish Hammer" and "Asik the Destroyer" by Bulls commentator Stacey King.

== Professional career ==
=== Fenerbahçe (2005–2006) ===
Aşık was first signed by Fenerbahçe in 2005. He only played two games before being loaned for the 2005–06 season to FMV Işık Spor Kulübü, in the 2nd division. Fenerbahçe didn't have room on the roster for Aşık and needed his in-game development to continue.

=== Alpella (2006–2007) ===
He signed for the 2006–07 season by Alpella. He averaged 10.75 points and 11.25 rebounds over 40 games playing for Alpella. Leaving Alpella in December 2007, he resumed the season signing with Fenerbahçe for a second time. He was destined to be a superstar but in 2008 he tore his ACL and didn't play for six months. When he returned, Aşık was creating havoc in the Turkish League, but he broke his collar-bone and didn't play for two months.

=== Return to Fenerbahçe (2007–2010) ===
After his recovery, Fenerbahçe tried to make him sign a new contract and held him out of the team until he signed. Aşık didn't give in and sat out the rest of the season. At Fenerbahçe, Aşık averaged 7.8 points and 6.1 rebounds during the 2007–08 and 2008–09 seasons. With the help of Aşık in the 2007–08 season, Fenerbahçe won the Turkish championship. He was also a two-time All-Star for Fenerbahçe in 2008 and 2009.

=== Chicago Bulls (2010–2012) ===
Aşık was drafted with the 36th overall pick by the Portland Trail Blazers in the 2008 NBA draft and immediately traded to the Chicago Bulls in a three-team deal. On July 13, 2010, Aşık was signed to a two-year deal with the Chicago Bulls.

On October 27, 2010, Aşık made his regular-season debut for the Bulls in their first game of the season, a road game against the Oklahoma City Thunder. Aşık earned more and more minutes as the season went on and eventually became one of the first players off the bench in the Bulls' playoff run. In the post-season, he suffered a fractured left fibula.

Aşık recovered from his injury suffered during the 2011 playoffs. After starting in only two regular season games in 2011–12, Aşık moved into the starting lineup after Joakim Noah was injured in game 3 of the Bulls' first-round series against Philadelphia 76ers. In the sixth and final game, Aşık missed two free throws in the last minute, allowing Philadelphia to take the lead and win the series. Throughout the game, however, Aşık had played well above his season averages, with 10 points, 9 rebounds and 2 blocks (vs. 3.1 points, 5.3 rebounds and 1 block per game).

=== Houston Rockets (2012–2014) ===
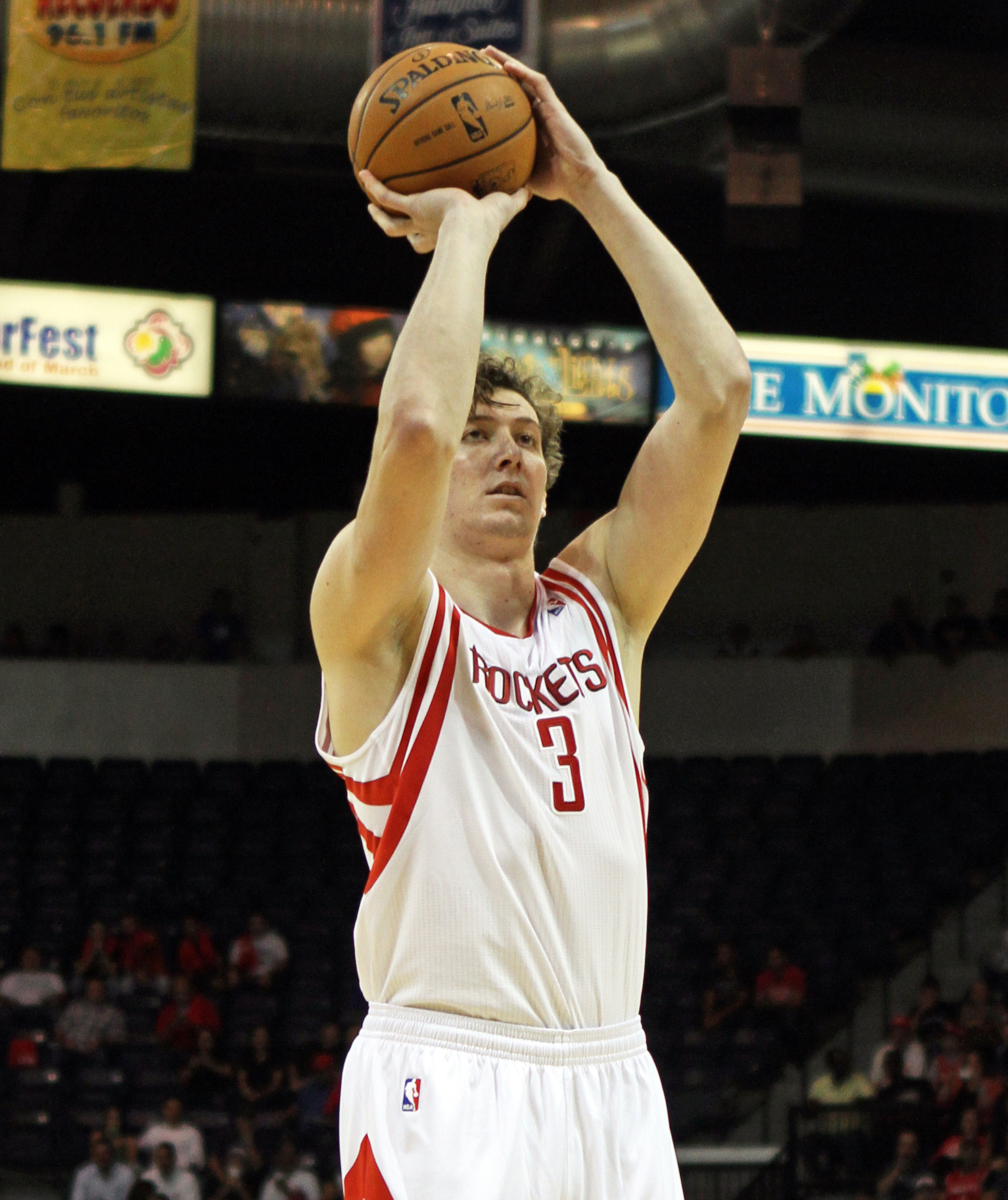
Aşık with the Houston Rockets in 2012

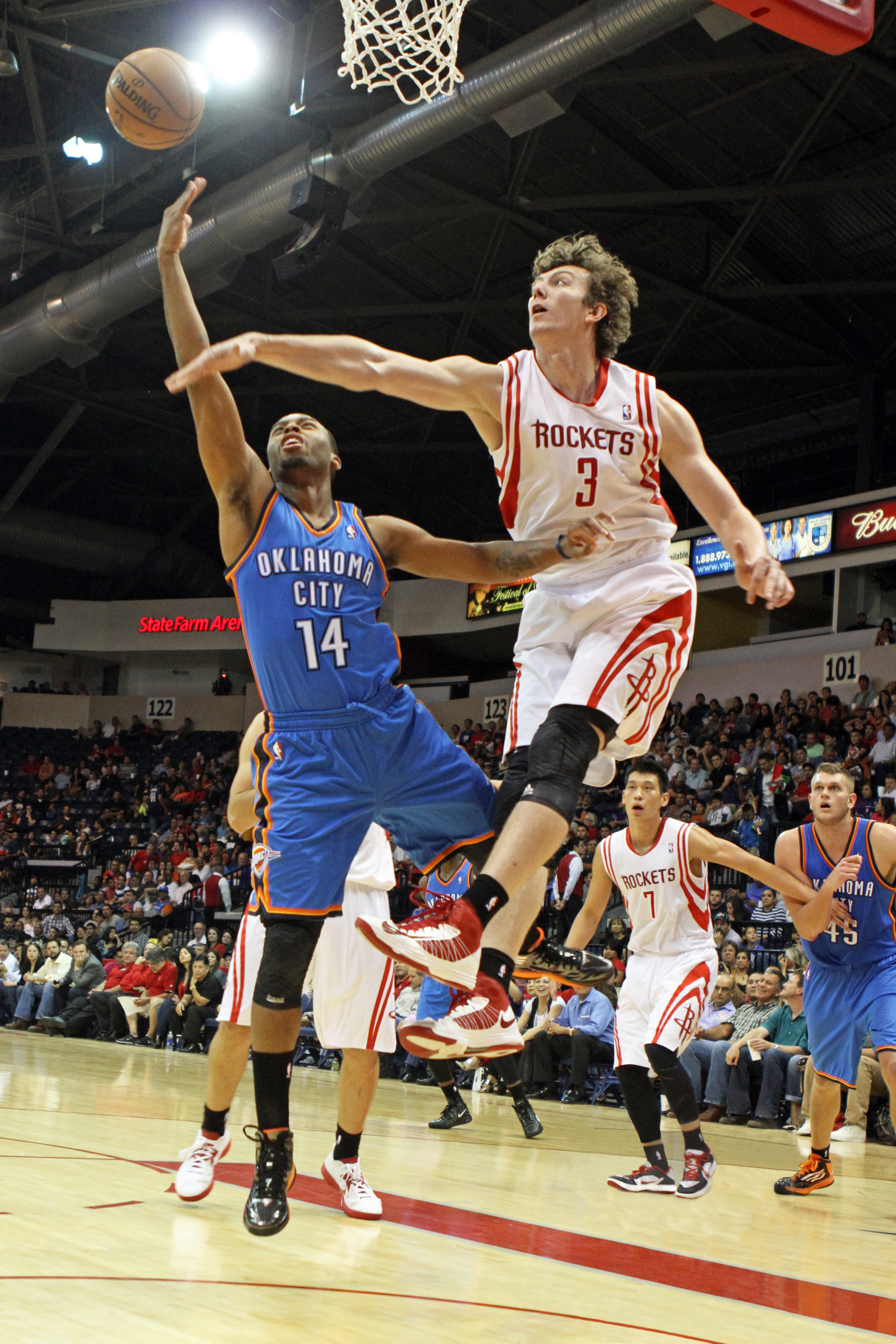
Aşık blocking a shot attempt by Daequan Cook in a pre-season game against the Oklahoma City Thunder in 2012

On July 20, 2012, Aşık signed an offer sheet with the Houston Rockets, reportedly worth $25.1 million for three years. Since Aşık was a restricted free agent, the Bulls could have matched Houston's offer, but decided not to do so and he officially joined the Rockets on July 24. On January 18, 2013, he set a career high for points with 22 in a loss to the Indiana Pacers and tied it on April 1, 2013, in a win against the Orlando Magic. Aşık had a breakout season, becoming the Rockets' starting center, averaging career highs averages of 10.1 points, 11.7 rebounds and 1.1 blocks in 30.0 minutes per game. His 956 total rebound count led the league in that category. Aşık helped the Rockets to a 45–37 record and the team made the playoffs for the first time since the 2008–09 NBA season.

With the Rockets' 2013 off-season acquisition of Dwight Howard, Aşık role was dramatically reduced. After the Rockets initially started the 2013–14 season with Howard at power forward and Aşık at center, coach Kevin McHale eventually changed the team's game style, and Aşık was moved to the bench in favor of up-and-coming forward, Terrence Jones. In December 2013, Aşık injured his knee and was out for two months. In just 48 games in 2013–14, Aşık averaged 5.8 points and 7.9 rebounds per game.

=== New Orleans Pelicans (2014–2018) ===
On July 15, 2014, Aşık was traded to the New Orleans Pelicans in a three-team trade that also involved the Rockets and the Washington Wizards. On October 28, he made his debut for the Pelicans in their season-opening game against the Orlando Magic. In 33 minutes of action, he recorded 14 points, 17 rebounds, 5 blocks and 2 assists in a 101–84 win. On March 17, he tied his season-high of 16 points in a win over the Milwaukee Bucks. On April 12, he recorded his 13th double-double of the season with 13 points and 10 rebounds in a loss to the Houston Rockets.

On July 9, 2015, Aşık re-signed with the Pelicans on a five-year, $60 million contract. His signing was panned by experts; Sports Illustrated gave the contract an initial "D" rating. On October 8, he was ruled out for three weeks with a right calf strain. On March 20, 2016, he scored a then season-high 15 points and tied his season best with 14 rebounds in a 109–105 win over the Los Angeles Clippers. In the Pelicans' season finale on April 13, Aşık recorded a season-high 24 points and 11 rebounds in a 144–109 loss to the Minnesota Timberwolves. During the season, Asik's contract was repeatedly criticized in the media, including RealGM calling the deal the least tradeable contract in the NBA.

Aşık was limited to 31 games in 2016–17 due to a bacterial infection that was later diagnosed as Crohn's disease. Aşık missed eight months with the illness and lost 30 pounds as a result.

=== Return to Chicago (2018) ===
On February 1, 2018, Aşık was traded, along with Jameer Nelson, Tony Allen and a protected first-round pick, to the Chicago Bulls in exchange for Nikola Mirotić and a 2018 second-round pick. In addition, Chicago will have the right to swap its 2021 second-round pick with New Orleans' own 2021 second-round pick. On September 22, Aşık was ruled out indefinitely with inflammatory arthritis that flared up over the summer. On October 21, he was waived by the Bulls. On June 26, 2019, the NBA removed Asik's contract from the Bulls' books via career-ending injury/illness.

== International career ==
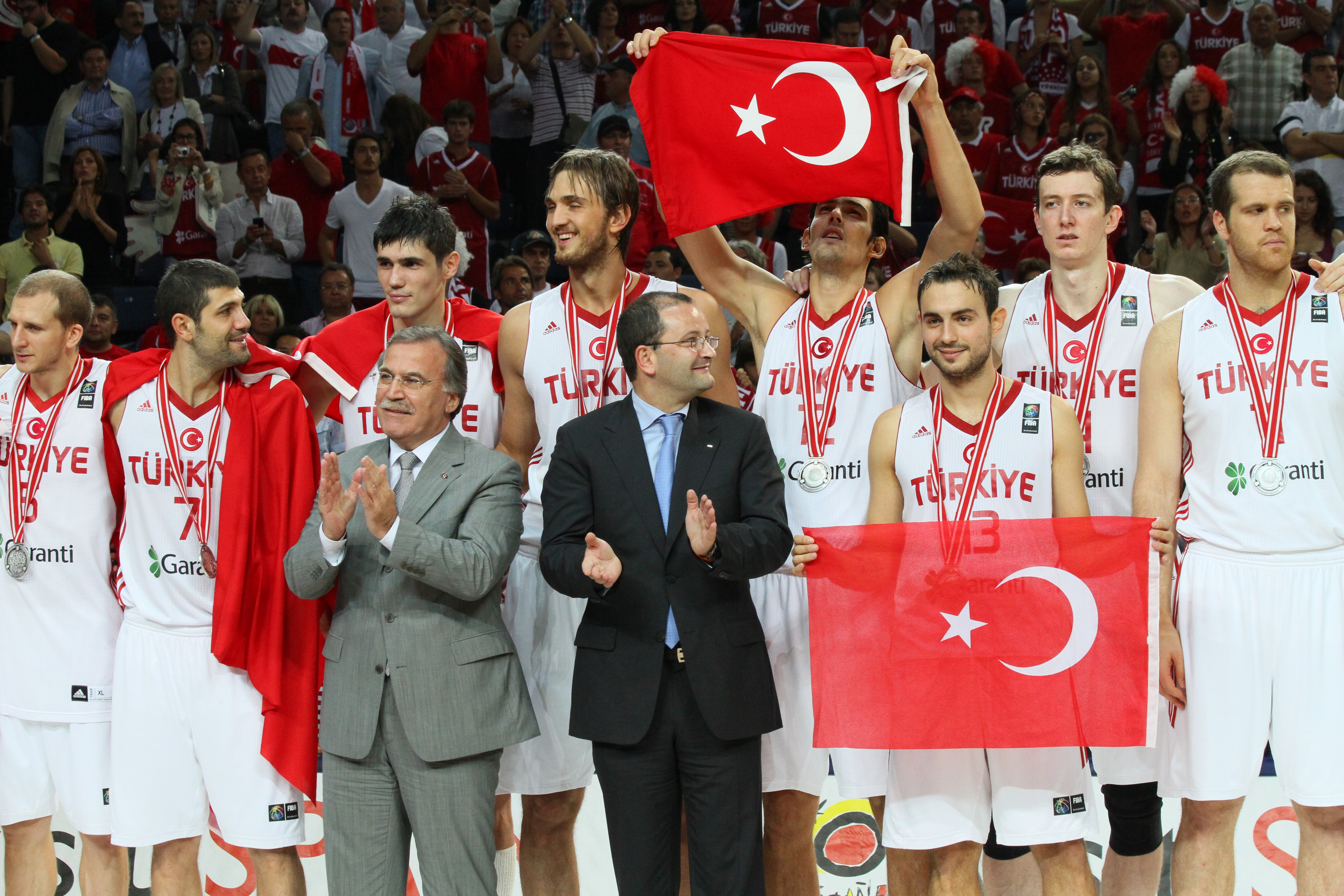
Aşık (second from right) with Turkey in 2010

Aşık first played on the national stage when he was appointed to Turkey's 2006 U20 European Championship Men's Division A team. He played a supporting role, averaging only 2 points and 2.6 rebounds per game. The 2006 Turkish men's national U-20 team won the silver medal, losing in the championship to Serbia & Montenegro. In 2010, Aşık was a part of the Turkey national team for the 2010 FIBA World Championship. He played a significant role for Turkey with 8.9 points and 6.9 rebounds per game, helping Turkey to the championship game against the United States. Turkey fell to the US 81–64, achieving the silver medal. He proved himself against some of the world's greatest players, even scoring 17 points in a landslide victory over China.

== Player profile ==
Aşık is known as a prominent interior defender and outstanding shot-blocker. In addition to being a rebounder and help-defender, Aşık's offensive game improved with his move to the Rockets in 2012.

== Career statistics ==
Legend
GP	Games played	GS	Games started	MPG	Minutes per game
FG%	Field-goal percentage	3P%	3-point field-goal percentage	FT%	Free-throw percentage
RPG	Rebounds per game	APG	Assists per game	SPG	Steals per game
BPG	Blocks per game	PPG	Points per game	PIR	Performance index rating
**Bold**	Career high

=== NBA ===
*	Led the league

==== Regular season ====
Year	Team	GP	GS	MPG	FG%	3P%	FT%	RPG	APG	SPG	BPG	PPG
2010–11	Chicago	**82**	0	12.1	**.553**	—	.500	3.7	.4	.2	.7	2.8
2011–12	Chicago	66	2	14.7	.506	—	.456	5.3	.5	.5	1.0	3.1
2012–13	Houston	**82***	**82***	**30.0**	.541	.000	.562	**11.7**	**.9**	**.6**	**1.1**	**10.1**
2013–14	Houston	48	19	20.2	.532	—	**.619**	7.9	.5	.3	.8	5.8
2014–15	New Orleans	76	76	26.1	.517	—	.582	9.8	**.9**	.4	.7	7.3
2015–16	New Orleans	68	64	17.3	.533	—	.545	6.1	.4	.3	.3	4.0
2016–17	New Orleans	31	19	15.5	.477	—	.590	5.3	.5	.2	.3	2.7
2017–18	New Orleans	14	0	8.6	.438	—	.333	2.6	.1	.1	.1	1.3
2017–18	Chicago	4	0	15.3	.333	—	.000	2.5	.3	.3	.5	1.0
Career		471	262	19.6	.528	.000	.551	7.1	.6	.4	.7	5.3

==== Playoffs ====
Year	Team	GP	GS	MPG	FG%	3P%	FT%	RPG	APG	SPG	BPG	PPG
2011	Chicago	**15**	0	9.9	.462	—	.300	2.1	.1	.1	.5	1.0
2012	Chicago	6	3	21.3	.500	—	.353	4.7	1.2	.2	**1.7**	3.3
2013	Houston	6	**6**	**34.7**	**.564**	—	.638	**11.2**	.5	.5	**1.7**	**12.3**
2014	Houston	6	4	27.2	.485	—	**1.000**	8.2	.7	.5	.7	5.8
2015	New Orleans	4	4	19.8	.200	—	.571	7.3	**1.5**	**1.3**	.0	2.0
Career		37	17	19.6	.486	—	.548	5.5	.6	.4	.9	4.1

=== Euroleague ===
*	Led the league

Year	Team	GP	GS	MPG	FG%	3P%	FT%	RPG	APG	SPG	BPG	PPG	PIR
2007–08	Fernerbahçe	**15**	0	18.6	.595	.000	**.527**	5.5	.4	**.7**	**2.1***	7.8	**11.9**
2009–10	Fernerbahçe	7	**4**	**22.2**	**.658**	—	.364	**6.0**	**.7**	.0	1.4	**8.9**	10.6
Career		22	4	19.7	.616	.000	.466	5.6	.5	.5	1.9	8.1	11.5

== See also ==
- List of European basketball players in the United States
