= Gar Forman =

American basketball player and coach

New Orleans Pelicans
- Position: Special advisor

Personal information
- Born: Moraga, California, U.S.

Career information
- High school: Miramonte (Orinda, California)
- College: Utah State
- Coaching career: 1981–1998

Career history

Coaching
- 1981–1982: Utah State (GA)
- 1982–1983: College of the Desert (assistant)
- 1983–1985: College of the Desert
- 1985–1987: New Mexico State (assistant)
- 1987–1988: Cal Poly Pomona (assistant)
- 1988–1994: New Mexico State (assistant)
- 1994–1998: Iowa State (assistant)

Career highlights
- As executive: NBA Executive of the Year (2011)

Gar Forman is an American basketball executive who currently serves as a special advisor for the New Orleans Pelicans of the National Basketball Association (NBA). He worked in the Chicago Bulls' front office from 1998 to 2020, starting as a scout before being appointed as general manager in 2009. On June 22, 2011, Gar Forman won the NBA Executive of the Year Award, along with Miami Heat President Pat Riley.

== College career and scandal ==
Forman began his coaching career in 1981 as a graduate assistant at Utah State. The next season, he was named an assistant coach at College of the Desert for the 1982–1983 season, after which he served as the team's head coach for two seasons. In 1985, he was named an assistant coach at New Mexico State. In 1987, he became an assistant coach and recruiting coordinator at Cal Poly Pomona. In 1988, he returned to New Mexico State, where he served in the same position.

His second tenure at New Mexico State became "scandalized" when he was accused of directing staff to guide "potential transfers through sham correspondence courses at the notorious Southeastern College of the Assemblies of God (SCAG)". However, he was eventually cleared by the NCAA.

In 1994, he joined Iowa State as an assistant coach and recruiting coordinator, a position he held until 1998.

== Chicago Bulls ==
Forman joined the Chicago Bulls as a scout in 1998. In 2004, he was named the team's Director of Player Personnel. He was named general manager of the Bulls on May 21, 2009.

As general manager, Forman supervised player personnel, coaching, scouting, training, and administration. During the summer of 2010, Forman led the charge to reload a Bulls squad after two consecutive .500 seasons and early playoff exits. On June 23, 2010, Forman named Tom Thibodeau the 18th head coach of the Chicago Bulls.

During his tenure with the Bulls (as general manager, and previously as Director of Player Personnel), Forman oversaw the drafting of Taj Gibson (First Team All-Rookie 2010), Derrick Rose (NBA Rookie of the Year 2009 and 2011 MVP), Kirk Hinrich (NBA All-Defense Team 2007), and Ben Gordon (NBA Sixth Man of the Year 2005).

Forman was criticized for passing on the opportunity to draft several notable players, including Draymond Green, Jae Crowder, Isaiah Thomas, Caris LeVert, Malcolm Brogdon, Tim Hardaway Jr., Chandler Parsons, Mason Plumlee, Seth Curry and Rudy Gobert, all of whom were taken either late in the draft, or went undrafted. Most general managers also missed on those players.

Forman was relieved of his general manager duties on April 13, 2020.

On December 10, 2020, Forman was hired as a special advisor to the New Orleans Pelicans front office.

== Private life and education ==
Forman was born in Moraga, California, the son of Ken and Janet Forman.

Forman received a B.A. in Marketing Education with a minor in Business Administration in 1984 from the Jon M. Huntsman School of Business at Utah State University. During his years in Chicago, he lived with his sons and wife in Buffalo Grove, Illinois.
