= Mike Wilhelm (basketball) =

American basketball player, coach, and scout

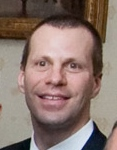
- Wilhelm visits the White House with the Chicago Bulls in 2009.

Personal information
- Born: 1966 or 1967 (age 59–60)

Career information
- High school: Saint Ignatius (Cleveland, Ohio)
- College: Southampton (1986–1990)
- Position: Assistant coach / Scout
- Coaching career: 1990–present

Career history

Coaching
- 1990–1992: Sundsvall Dragons
- 1995–1996: Haverford (assistant)
- 1997–1999: Cleveland Rockers (assistant)
- 2002–2018: Chicago Bulls (assistant)

Michael Peter Wilhelm is an American basketball coach who previously served as an assistant coach for the NBA's Chicago Bulls. He has also coached in Sweden and in the WNBA and has held scouting positions with the Cleveland Cavaliers and Denver Nuggets.

== Early life ==
Wilhelm was born in Cleveland to German American parents. Wilhelm grew up in South Euclid and Rocky River, Ohio. After graduating from St. Ignatius High School, he spent a year at Worcester Academy. Wilhelm played college basketball at Southampton College in Long Island, NY.

== Early coaching career ==
After graduating from Southampton College in 1990, Wilhelm began his professional coaching career in Sweden as the head coach of the Sundsvall Dragons Basketball Club during the 1990-91 season. His tenure in Sweden provided him with early international experience and introduced him to professional coaching at a young age.

== NBA/WNBA coaching career ==
Following his season in Sweden, Wilhelm spent the next 28 years working in various capacities within the NBA and WNBA. He served as an advance scout and assistant coach for the Cleveland Cavaliers and the Cleveland Rockers of the WNBA, and later as an advance scout for the Miami Sol. He also held a regional scouting position with the Denver Nuggets. Wilhelm then served as an assistant coach with the Chicago Bulls from 2002 to 2020. With the Bulls, he contributed to player development, game preparation, in-game strategy, and talent evaluation.

== Personal life ==
He is married with two children.
