= Andy Greer =

American basketball coach (born 1962)

Personal information
- Born: August 6, 1962 (age 64) New York, New York, U.S.

Career information
- College: Brockport (1980–1984)
- Position: Coach
- Coaching career: 1983–present

Career history

Coaching
- 1983–1985: Genesee CC (assistant)
- 1985–1987: Mansfield (assistant)
- 1987–1989: Brandeis (assistant)
- 1989–1990: Boston University (assistant)
- 1990–1993: USC (assistant)
- 1993–1997: USMMA
- 1997–2000: Northern Illinois (assistant)
- 2001: Northern Illinois (interim HC)
- 2001–2003: New York Knicks (assistant)
- 2003–2007: Houston Rockets (assistant)
- 2007–2009: Memphis Grizzlies (assistant)
- 2010–2015: Chicago Bulls (assistant)
- 2015–2016: Toronto Raptors (assistant)
- 2016–2019: Minnesota Timberwolves (assistant)
- 2020–2025: New York Knicks (assistant)

Andy Greer (born August 6, 1962) is an American professional basketball coach who most recently served as the assistant coach for the New York Knicks of the National Basketball Association (NBA). He was formerly an assistant for the Minnesota Timberwolves, in charge of their defense. He was the head coach of the U.S. Merchant Marine Academy from 1993 to 1997 and served as interim head coach for the Northern Illinois University during the second half of the 2000–01 season.

== Coaching career ==
On September 8, 2010, Greer was hired by the Chicago Bulls as an assistant coach.

On June 29, 2015, Greer was hired to serve as an assistant coach by the Toronto Raptors. He joined the Minnesota Timberwolves as an assistant coach on September 25, 2016. On January 6, 2019, he was relieved of his duties together with head coach Tom Thibodeau.

On September 4, 2020, Greer was hired as an assistant coach for the New York Knicks under head coach Tom Thibodeau. Following Thibodeau's firing and the hiring of Mike Brown, the Knicks announced that Greer would not return for the 2025–26 NBA season.

== Head coaching record ==
Record table
Season	Team	Overall	Conference	Standing	Postseason
Northern Illinois (Mid-American Conference) (2000–2001)
2000–01	Northern Illinois	5–23	7–11	5th (MAC-W)	
Total:		5–23 (.179)			
National champion Postseason invitational champion Conference regular season champion Conference regular season and conference tournament champion Division regular season champion Division regular season and conference tournament champion Conference tournament champion

== Personal life ==
Greer's younger brother, Larry, serves as an assistant coach for the New York Knicks.
Andy (and Larry) attended Camp Delaware, a high end sleep away summer camp in Winsted, Connecticut for many years as young adults in the early 1980s.
