= Cardinal Leger Secondary School =

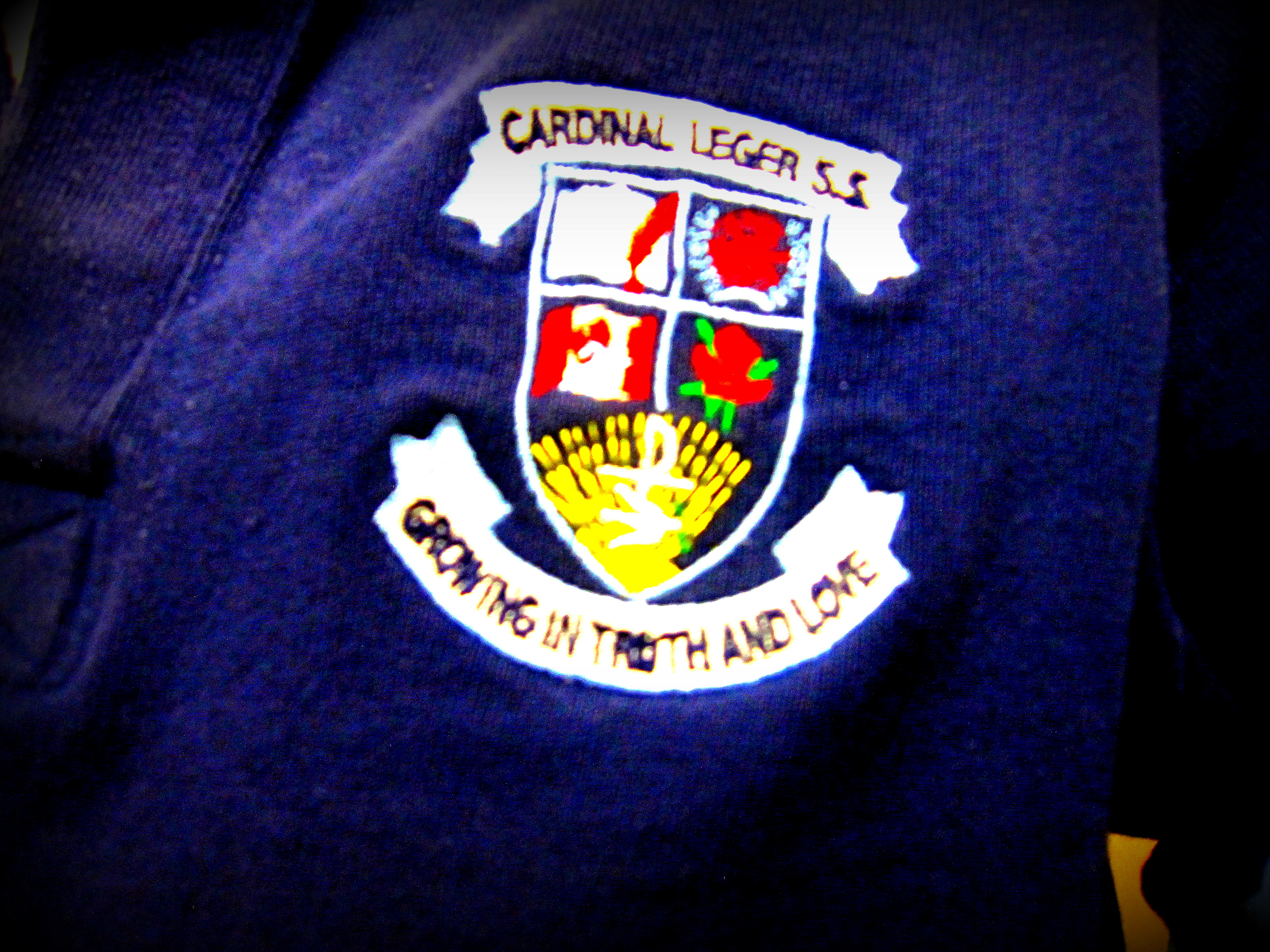

Location
- 75 Mary Street; Brampton, Ontario, L6W 3K5; Canada; 43.6842°N 79.7516°W

Information
- School type: Separate High school
- Motto: Growing in truth and love.
- Religious affiliation: Roman Catholic
- Founded: 1976
- School board: Dufferin-Peel Catholic District School Board
- Superintendent: Viviana Varano
- Area trustee: Aneisha Thomas
- Principal: Jason Pratt
- Grades: 9 to 12
- Enrolment: updated: 1,233 students (includes all Extended and Immersion French students and regular students).
- Language: English, programs include Extended and Immersion French, Core French, Spanish
- Campus: Suburban
- Area: Brampton West
- Colours: Grey, Navy and Dark Blue
- Mascot: Louie the Lancer
- Team name: Lancers
- Website: www.dpcdsb.org/LEGER/

Cardinal Leger Secondary School is a separate school in the downtown sector of Brampton, Ontario, Canada. It is a member of the Dufferin-Peel Catholic District School Board and is connected to both St. Mary's Parish and St. Annes. The school enrolls about 1,233 students.

== History ==
Cardinal Leger opened in 1976, originally named St. Stephens. The school expanded in 1980 and underwent major renovations in 1995 in order to attain its current modern appearance. It was the first Catholic high school in Brampton.

== Notable students and alumni ==
- Marc Eversley, former general manager of Chicago Bulls
- Kadeisha Buchanan, soccer player

== See also ==
- Education in Ontario
- List of secondary schools in Ontario
