= Dick Klein (basketball) =

American athlete (1920–2000)

Personal information
- Born: September 16, 1920 Fort Madison, Iowa, U.S.
- Died: October 10, 2000 (aged 80) Greenville, South Carolina, U.S.
- Listed height: 6 ft 3 in (1.91 m)
- Listed weight: 215 lb (98 kg)

Career information
- High school: Fort Madison (Fort Madison, Iowa)
- College: Northwestern (1939–1941)
- Position: Center

Career history

Playing
- 1945–1946: Chicago American Gears

Coaching
- 1946–1947: Gary Ingots

Dick Öland Klein (September 16, 1920 – October 10, 2000) was an American athlete and businessman who founded the National Basketball Association's Chicago Bulls in 1966. He served as the team's first general manager and later worked as a scout for the Phoenix Suns.

== Background ==
Hailing from Iowa, Klein played basketball at Northwestern University for Hall of Fame coach Dutch Lonborg. He then competed for the United States Navy's Great Lakes Blue Jackets, who traveled throughout the United States raising money for the Navy Relief Society.

From 1945 to 1946, Klein played professionally for the National Basketball League's Chicago American Gears. He also dabbled in minor league baseball, spending one summer as a pitcher in the Cleveland Indians' farm system. Once his playing days were over, he moved to the Chicago suburbs and embarked on a highly successful career distributing promotional items to banks and other companies.

== Founding of the Chicago Bulls ==
The late 1940s through early 1960s were a low point for professional basketball in Chicago. The American Gears suddenly folded in 1947 due to poor financial decisions by owner Maurice White. Three years later, the Chicago Stags of the early National Basketball Association disbanded due to lack of fan interest. The NBA returned to Chicago with the Chicago Packers in 1961, but their poor first season record (18–62) turned off many fans, and the team was sold to a group of Maryland investors in 1962.

The Chicago Packers were scheduled to relocate to Baltimore by the fall of 1963. In the meantime, the team adopted a new nickname, the Chicago Zephyrs. Hoping to keep the Zephyrs in Chicago, Dick Klein tried to purchase the team in 1963, but he failed, and the team left the city after posting a 25–55 second season record. However, Klein was determined to bring professional basketball back to Chicago, and started recruiting local businessmen to help him found an expansion team.

Most investors were skeptical of Klein's venture, given the failure of the Zephyrs and their predecessors. A turning point occurred when Klein received the support of the American Broadcasting Company, who was negotiating with the NBA for television rights. ABC believed a successful Chicago team would help boost ratings, and once Klein had their backing, he was able to attract more partners. On January 26, 1966, his group was finally awarded an NBA expansion franchise at a cost of $1.6 million, and Klein was named general manager.

Klein's first task was to coin a nickname for the new Chicago team. He wanted a name that evoked images of the Chicago stockyards, which were close to the stadium where the team was expected to play. According to Klein, he had originally considered Matadors or Toreadors, but when his youngest son dismissed these prospective nicknames as "a bunch of bull," he decided to name the team the Chicago Bulls. He then recruited a neighbor to design the Bulls' familiar team logo. He chose the colors red and black from his former alma mater, Fort Madison High School, where he went to school and played basketball from 1934 to 1938.

== Team management ==
Klein selected Johnny "Red" Kerr and Al Bianchi to serve as the Bulls' head coach and assistant coach, respectively. Since both were former players who were still under contract with their old teams, Klein actually drafted his coaching staff via the NBA Expansion Draft. He then acquired Guy Rodgers, Jerry Sloan, Len Chappell, Jim Washington, Erwin Mueller, Don Kojis, and Bob Boozer to form the core playing unit for the Bulls. In support of the new team, Klein and Kerr paraded through Chicago in a flatbed truck, accompanied by a live bull.

Though the Bulls finished the 1966–67 NBA season with a 33–48 record, they still managed to reach the postseason. This was the first time any expansion franchise reached the playoffs in their first year, a feat that has not been repeated. They lost in the first round to the St. Louis Hawks in four games. Klein considered the season a success, saying, "We had good players led by good men, so we became competitive".

However, the Bulls regressed the following season, winning just 29 games, and as the team struggled to increase attendance figures, tensions emerged between Klein and Kerr. Klein openly criticized Kerr in the local media, and he frequently sent notes to his coaching staff during games, which contained messages such as "That's seven turnovers this quarter". Tired of Klein's involvement, Kerr finally left the team in 1968 and was replaced by Dick Motta.

Unfortunately, Klein feuded with Motta, as well. After Klein sent Erwin Mueller to the Seattle SuperSonics for cash in 1969, Motta reportedly said, "You can't play with money; money won't play!". Motta then ordered Klein to consult him before any trade he made in the future. Facing pressure from other members of team management, Klein stepped down as general manager before the start of the Bulls fourth season, but he retained his share of the ownership and saw the Bulls improve significantly under Motta during the next few seasons. The team won 51 games during the 1970–71 season and 57 games the next season, and the Bulls began to secure a steady fan base.

== After the Bulls ==
Klein orchestrated the sale of several owners' shares of the team (including his own) to a new ownership group that included Chicago Blackhawks owner Arthur Wirtz in the summer of 1972. "In my opinion, with Wirtz at the steering wheel, the Bulls were in good hands," he later said. The Bulls eventually became one of the NBA's most profitable franchises, due in large part to the presence of Michael Jordan during the 1980s and 1990s (Wirtz, in turn, sold the Bulls to current owner Jerry Reinsdorf in 1984). Many of Klein's personnel selections blossomed into long-term NBA successes, including Utah Jazz coach Jerry Sloan, and sports magnate Jerry Colangelo, who worked in Klein's front office in the Bull's early years. Klein's friendship with Colangelo and continued passion for the sport led him to serve as a Southeastern scout for the Phoenix Suns. He served in that capacity until shortly before his death in Greenville, South Carolina in 2000. The Bulls named him a member of the inaugural Ring of Honor in 2024.

== Bibliography ==
- Sachare, Alex (1999), The Chicago Bulls Encyclopedia, Chicago: Contemporary
