= Marc Eversley =

Canadian basketball executive (born 1969)

Personal information
- Born: 1968 or 1969 (age 57–58) London, England
- Listed height: 6 ft 8 in (2.03 m)

Career information
- High school: Cardinal Leger Secondary School
- College: Urbana University

Career history
- 2006–2013: Toronto Raptors (Assistant general manager)
- 2013–2016: Washington Wizards (VP of Player Personnel)
- 2016–2020: Philadelphia 76ers (Vice President of Sixers Player Staff)
- 2020–2026: Chicago Bulls (General manager)

Marc Eversley (born 1969) is an American basketball executive who most recently served as the general manager of the Chicago Bulls of the National Basketball Association.

== Career ==
Eversley's family moved from London to Toronto when he was four years old. After university, Eversley worked at Nike in their retail and marketing departments. Following the clothing company, Eversley worked for the Toronto Raptors under Bryan Colangelo. When Colangelo was let go, he moved to Washington. He rejoined Colangelo's staff in Philadelphia, and stayed with that team past Colangelo's firing.

He is the first Canadian-trained basketball player to become an NBA general manager, the first NBA general manager from the Greater Toronto Area, and the first person of color to serve as the general manager of the Chicago Bulls franchise. On April 6, 2026, Eversley was fired along with Bulls executive vice president Artūras Karnišovas.
