= DeMar DeRozan =

American basketball player (born 1989)

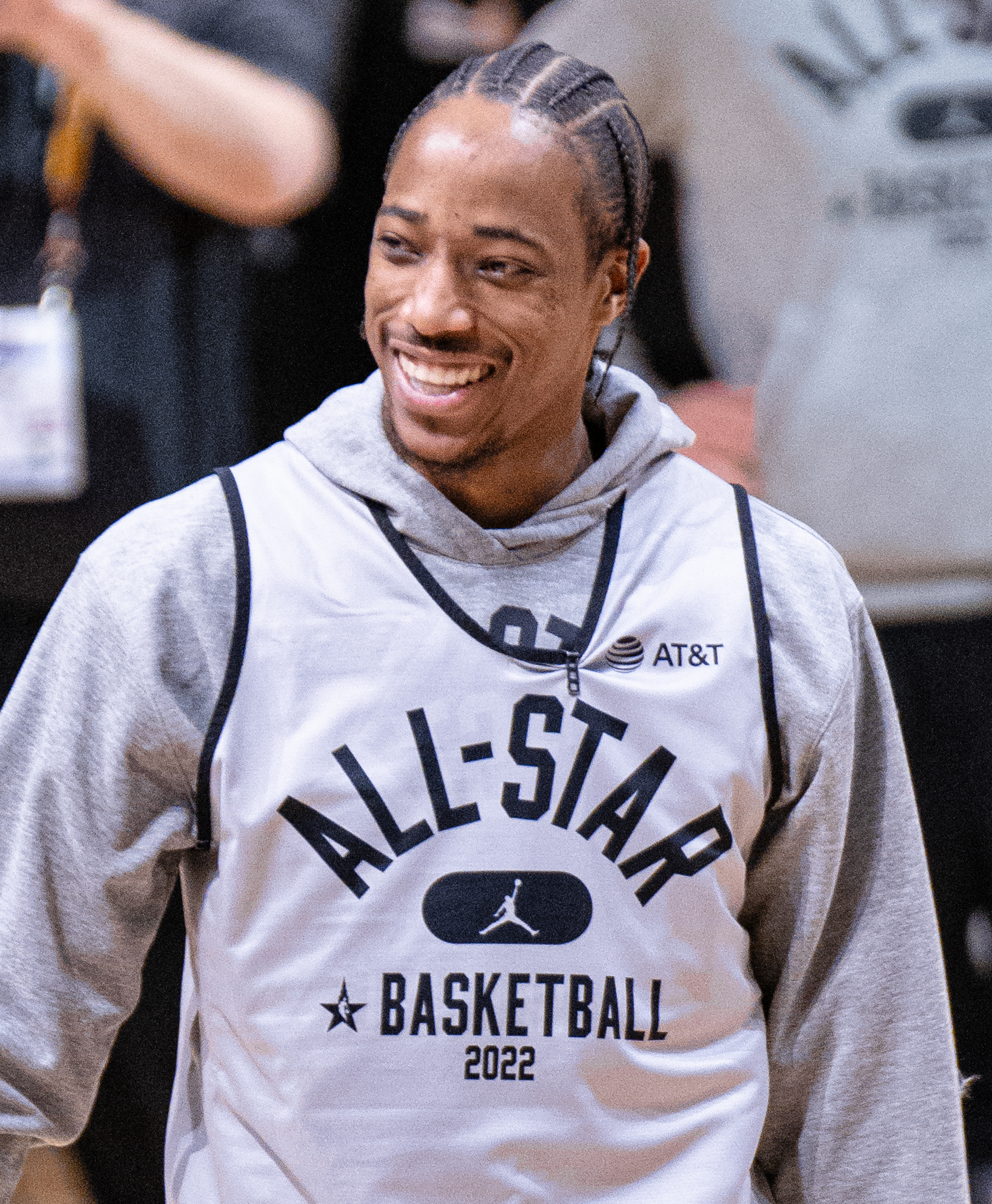
- DeRozan at the 2022 NBA All-Star Game

No. 10 – Denver Nuggets
- Position: Small forward / shooting guard
- League: NBA

Personal information
- Born: August 7, 1989 (age 37) Compton, California, U.S.
- Listed height: 6 ft 6 in (1.98 m)
- Listed weight: 220 lb (100 kg)

Career information
- High school: Compton (Compton, California)
- College: USC (2008–2009)
- NBA draft: 2009: 1st round, 9th overall pick
- Drafted by: Toronto Raptors
- Playing career: 2009–present

Career history
- 2009–2018: Toronto Raptors
- 2018–2021: San Antonio Spurs
- 2021–2024: Chicago Bulls
- 2024–2026: Sacramento Kings
- 2026–present: Denver Nuggets

Career highlights
- 6× NBA All-Star (2014, 2016–2018, 2022, 2023); 2× All-NBA Second Team (2018, 2022); All-NBA Third Team (2017); Pac-10 tournament MVP (2009); Pac-10 All-Freshman Team (2009); No. 10 retired by USC Trojans; First-team Parade All-American (2008); McDonald's All-American (2008)
- Stats at NBA.com
- Stats at Basketball Reference
Medals
Men's basketball
Representing United States
Olympic Games
Gold medal – first place	2016 Rio de Janeiro	Team
World Cup
Gold medal – first place	2014 Spain	Team

DeMar Darnell DeRozan (born August 7, 1989) is an American professional basketball player for the Denver Nuggets of the National Basketball Association (NBA). He played college basketball for the USC Trojans and was selected ninth overall by the Toronto Raptors in the 2009 NBA draft. Nicknamed "Deebo", DeRozan is a six-time NBA All-Star and a three-time All-NBA Team member. DeRozan is currently fourth among active NBA players on the all-time scoring list.

DeRozan spent nine seasons with the Raptors, where he became the franchise's all-time leading scorer and led the team to five playoff runs. He was traded to the San Antonio Spurs in the summer of 2018 and the Chicago Bulls in 2021. He was traded to the Sacramento Kings in the summer of 2024. DeRozan won a gold medal with the United States national team in the 2014 World Cup and the 2016 Summer Olympics.

== Early life ==
DeRozan was born on August 7, 1989 in Compton, California to Frank and Diane DeRozan. Frank died in 2021.

== High school career ==
DeRozan attended Compton High School and was ranked as one of the top college recruits in the nation from the class of 2008. He was ranked No. 3 in the nation by Rivals.com and No. 6 by Scout.com. He played on the varsity basketball team for all four years of high school. As a freshman, he averaged 26.1 points and 8.4 rebounds. During his sophomore year, he averaged 22.6 points and 8.4 rebounds, while as a junior he averaged 22.3 points, 7.8 rebounds, 3.0 assists, and 3.2 steals.

As a senior averaging 29.2 points and 7.9 rebounds per game, DeRozan led Compton High School to a 26–6 record, a second consecutive Moore League championship and the CIF Division IAA Southern Section quarter-finals. For his efforts he was awarded the Moore League Most Valuable Player Award and named to the California All-State team. DeRozan was a member of the 2008 McDonald's All-American Team, and also won the 2008 McDonald's All-American Slam Dunk Competition. He was also invited to play in the 2008 Jordan Brand Classic at Madison Square Garden and the Nike Hoop Summit, where he scored a team-high 17 points. DeRozan's achievements on the court in his senior year saw him earn first-team Parade All-American honors and First Team Best in the West honors.

== College career ==
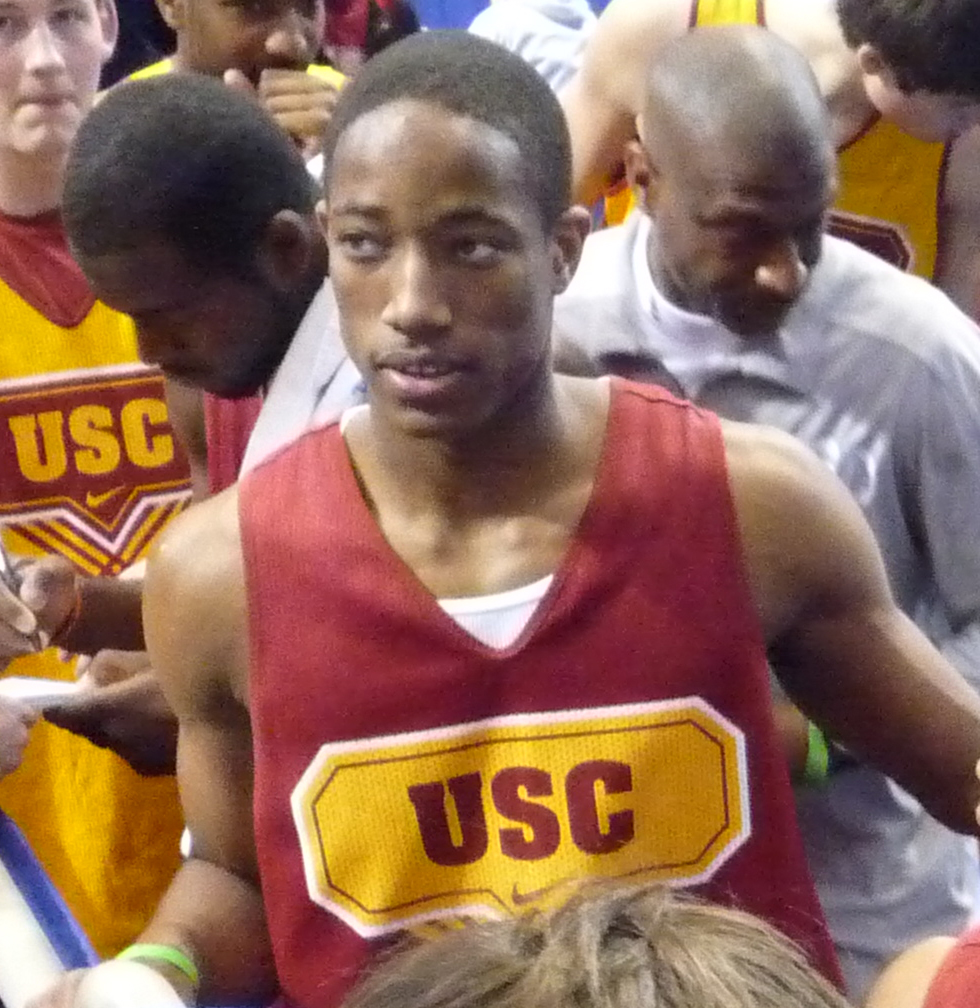
DeRozan during a practice at the 2009 NCAA tournament

In November 2007, DeRozan signed a letter of intent to play basketball at USC. He chose USC over Arizona and North Carolina.

In his first game for the Trojans, DeRozan scored a team-high 21 points with seven rebounds in an exhibition game against Azusa Pacific, an 85–64 victory at the Galen Center. DeRozan had 14 points in his first career regular season game in a win over UC Irvine. He scored 21 points along with a career-high 13 rebounds against UCLA in the Pac-10 Tournament semifinals, before scoring a career-high 22 points on 10-for-16 shooting to lead his team to a 61-49 win over Arizona State in the Pac-10 Tournament final. His efforts in the tournament saw him earn First Team Pac-10 All-Freshman honors in addition to being named Pac-10 Tournament MVP. The Trojans went to the 2009 NCAA Men's Division I Basketball Tournament as a 10th seed, where they lost in the 2nd round to Michigan State.

DeRozan started all 35 season games for the Trojans, scoring in double figures 28 times and posting four double-doubles. He ranked third on team in points (13.9 ppg), second in rebounds (5.7 rpg), third in assists (1.5 apg), and second in field-goal percentage (.523, eighth-best in conference). DeRozan followed his regular-season efforts by averaging 19.8 points in USC's five postseason games. His 485 points ranks third all-time and his 201 rebounds is fourth all-time for a USC freshman.

== Professional career ==
=== Toronto Raptors (2009–2018) ===
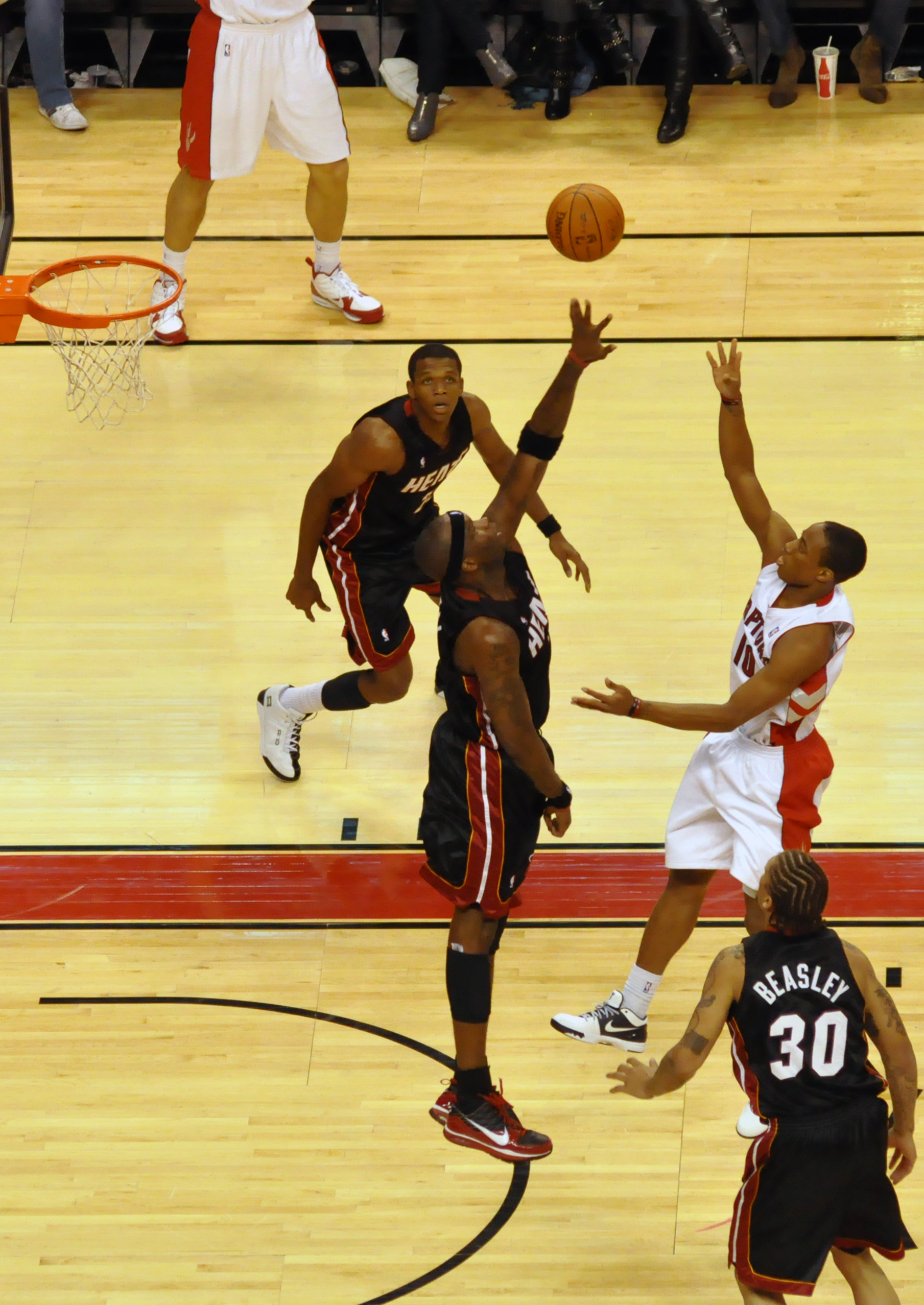
DeRozan shooting over Jermaine O'Neal in a 2009 game

==== Early years (2009–2013) ====
On April 8, 2009, DeRozan announced his decision to enter the 2009 NBA draft and forgo his final three years of eligibility at USC. On June 25, 2009, he was selected ninth overall by the Toronto Raptors in the 2009 draft. He stated that part of the reason he left for the NBA after only one year at USC was to help take better care of his mother, who has lupus.

On July 9, 2009, DeRozan signed his rookie scale contract with the Raptors. As the fourth contestant in the 2010 Sprite Slam Dunk Competition, DeRozan lost in the final round against three-time champion Nate Robinson. The final percentage was 51% to 49%. DeRozan was selected to compete for the 2011 Sprite Slam Dunk Competition as a replacement for injured guard Brandon Jennings. He finished in third place.

On December 31, 2010, DeRozan scored a then career-high 37 points against the Houston Rockets. He matched that career high two more times over the next three years—against the Utah Jazz on November 12, 2012, and against the Chicago Bulls on November 15, 2013.

==== First All-Star appearance (2013–2015) ====
On January 22, 2014, DeRozan scored a then career-high 40 points against the Dallas Mavericks, shooting 15-of-22 from the field. On January 30, DeRozan was selected for the 2014 NBA All-Star Game as a reserve guard for the Eastern Conference All-Star team. He finished the game with 8 points, 3 rebounds, and 2 assists in 15 minutes. On February 1, he recorded a 36 points and a career-high 12 assists in a loss to the Portland Trail Blazers. On March 28, he led the Raptors to a playoff berth for the first time since 2008, with a victory over the Boston Celtics. He scored 30 points in the win, along with 3 rebounds, 4 assists, and 1 steal. On April 13, he scored 30 points against the Detroit Pistons to lead the Raptors to tie a franchise record of 47 wins.

DeRozan's 2013–14 season was a breakout year, averaging career-highs of 22.7 points, 4.3 rebounds, 4.0 assists, 30% from beyond the arc, and finished fourth in total free-throws made and seventh in attempts. He led the Raptors to a 48–34 record and a third-seed finish in the Eastern Conference.

In DeRozan's first playoff game against the Brooklyn Nets on April 19, 2014, DeRozan scored 14 points on a 3-of-13 shooting as the game resulted in a loss. In Game 2, DeRozan bounced back and scored 30 points on 9-of-21 shooting in a 100–95 win. On April 25, he recorded 30 points, 5 rebounds, and 5 assists in a loss. That 30-point game made DeRozan the first Raptor to score 30 points in back-to-back playoffs games, and the first Raptor to score 30 in multiple playoff games since Vince Carter. The Raptors went on to lose to the Nets in seven games.

In the Raptors' season opening game of the 2014–15 season against the Atlanta Hawks in Toronto, DeRozan recorded career-highs with 11 rebounds and six steals, along with 15 points, in a 109–102 win. On November 29, 2014, he was ruled out indefinitely with a torn left adductor longus tendon. He sustained the injury the night before at the 8:23 mark of the third quarter against the Dallas Mavericks and did not return. On January 14, 2015, he returned to action, scoring 20 points on 9-of-14 shooting in a 100–84 win over the Philadelphia 76ers. On March 2, he scored a season-high 35 points in a 114–103 win over the Philadelphia 76ers. On March 30, DeRozan scored a career-high 42 points in a 99–96 win over the Houston Rockets. On April 17, he was named Eastern Conference Player of the Month for April, joining Kyle Lowry (December 2014) and Chris Bosh (January 2007) as the only players in team history to be named Player of the Month.

On April 24, in Game 3 of the Raptors' first-round playoff series with the Washington Wizards, DeRozan scored a playoff career-high 32 points while scoring a franchise playoff-record 20 points in the first quarter, surpassing Vince Carter's previous record of 19 points in a first quarter of a playoff game.

==== Conference Finals loss (2015–2016) ====
On November 10, 2015, DeRozan scored a then season-high 29 points in a loss to the New York Knicks. Reaching the 15-point mark for the eighth straight game to start the season, he became the first Raptor since Chris Bosh in 2009–10 to accomplish the feat. On December 14, DeRozan was named Eastern Conference Player of the Week for games played December 7–13, earning the honor for the first time in his seven-year career and became the seventh player in team history to be named Player of the Week. On January 8, he scored a then season-high 35 points in a 97–88 win over the Washington Wizards. On January 28, he was named an Eastern Conference All-Star reserve for the 2016 NBA All-Star Game, earning his second All-Star nod in three years. On February 2, DeRozan and teammate Kyle Lowry were selected as co-winners for Eastern Conference Player of the Month for January. The pair helped the Raptors go 12–2 during the month and recorded a franchise-record 11-game win streak. On February 22, he became the winningest player in Raptors history, passing Chris Bosh and Morris Peterson with his 233rd career win. With 22 points, he helped the Raptors defeat the New York Knicks 122–95. On March 4, he scored a season-high 38 points in a 117–115 win over the Portland Trail Blazers. In that game, he set an NBA record with 24 consecutive free throws made in one game. On March 12, he tied his season-high of 38 points while also recording 10 rebounds and seven assists in a 112–104 overtime win over the Miami Heat. On March 30, he scored 26 points in a 105–97 win over the Atlanta Hawks, helping the Raptors record a 50-win season for the first time in franchise history. On April 10, he scored 27 points in a 93–89 win over the New York Knicks in New York, setting a franchise record with 23 road victories in a season. DeRozan also moved ahead of Vince Carter for second on the Raptors' career scoring list, trailing only Chris Bosh.

The Raptors finished the regular season as the second seed in the Eastern Conference with a 56 – 26 record. In the first round of the playoffs, the Raptors faced the seventh-seeded Indiana Pacers, and in a Game 5 win on April 26, DeRozan scored 34 points to help the Raptors take a 3–2 series lead. In Game 7 of the series, DeRozan scored 30 points to help the Raptors win a best-of-seven series for the first time in franchise history. With a 4–3 series victory over the Pacers, the Raptors moved on to the second round to face the Miami Heat. In Game 5 of the Raptors' series with the Heat, DeRozan again scored 34 points to help the Raptors take a 3–2 series lead with a 99–91 win. In Game 7 of the series, he scored 28 points in a 116–89 win over the Heat, helping the Raptors advance to the conference finals for the first time in franchise history. In Game 4 of the Eastern Conference Finals against the Cleveland Cavaliers, DeRozan scored 32 points to help the Raptors win 105–99 and tie the series at 2–2. The Raptors went on to lose the next two games to bow out of the playoffs with a 4–2 defeat.

==== First All-NBA selection (2016–2017) ====
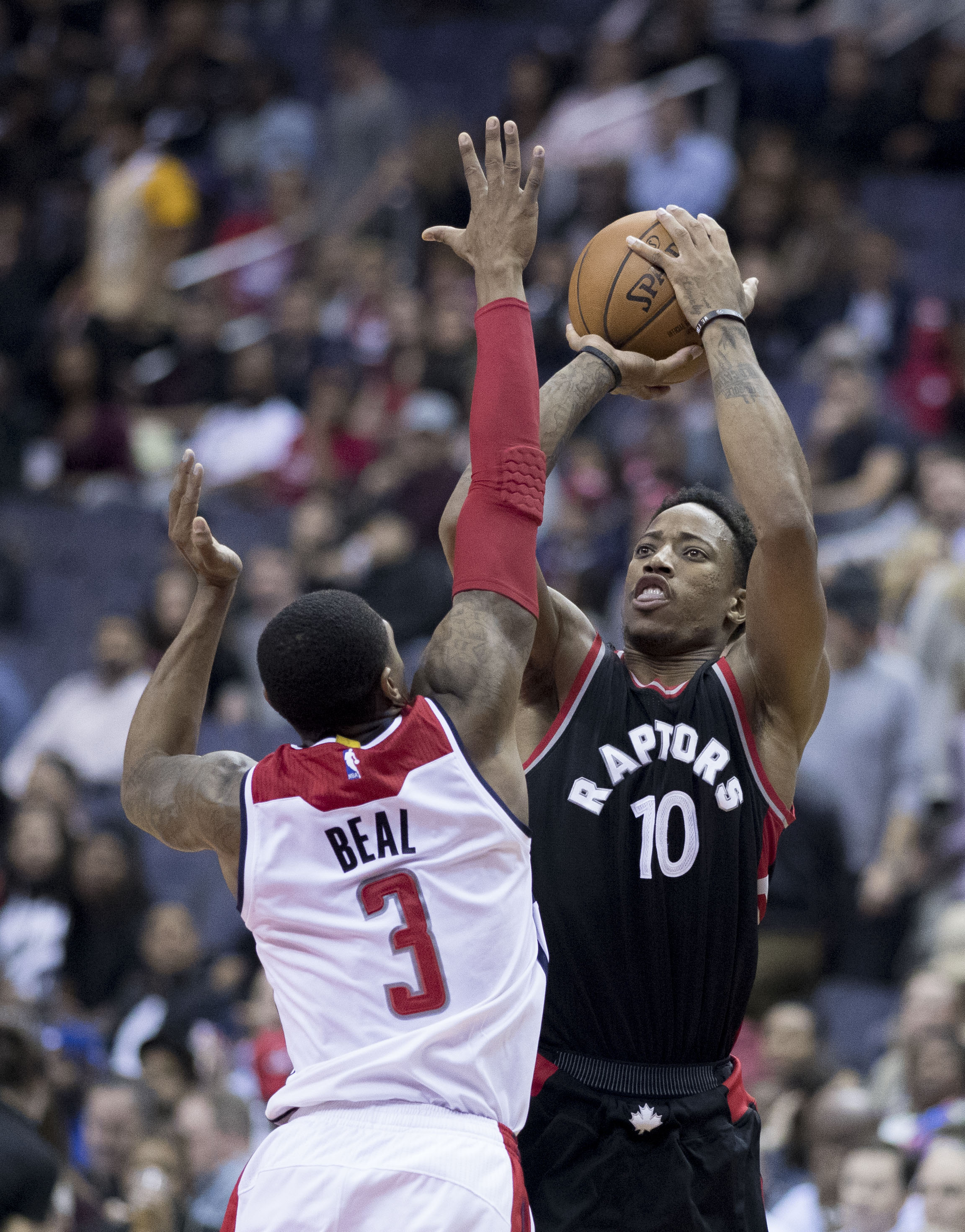
DeRozan shooting a jumpshot over Bradley Beal in 2016

On July 14, 2016, DeRozan re-signed with the Raptors to a five-year, $139 million contract. In the Raptors' season opener on October 26, 2016, DeRozan had his third career 40-point outing in a 109–91 win over the Detroit Pistons. Two days later, he had a 32-point effort in a 94–91 loss to the Cleveland Cavaliers. DeRozan's combined 72 points bested Vince Carter's franchise record of 65 for the most points through the first two games of a season, set in the 2003–04 season. With a 33-point effort on October 31 against the Denver Nuggets, DeRozan became the first ever Raptor with three straight 30-point games to begin a season. With 40 points against the Washington Wizards on November 2, DeRozan tied Mike James' franchise record with four consecutive 30-point games. He passed that mark two days later, scoring 34 points in a 96–87 win over the Miami Heat. His five straight 30-point games set the best such start to a season since Michael Jordan did it for six straight games to open the 1986–87 season. On November 12, he scored 33 points against the New York Knicks for his eighth 30-point game in nine games, becoming only the fourth player to register 30-plus points in eight of the first nine games of a season, joining Michael Jordan, World B. Free, and Tiny Archibald. With 34 points against the Golden State Warriors on November 16, DeRozan became the first NBA player with nine 30-point games in his team's first 11 games since Jordan in 1987–88. DeRozan's six field goals against the Los Angeles Lakers on December 2 saw him pass Vince Carter (3,536) for second on the franchise's all-time list; Chris Bosh still led at the time with 3,614. On December 28, he scored 29 points against Golden State and became Toronto's career scoring leader (10,290), passing Bosh's 10,275 points.

On January 8, 2017, DeRozan scored 36 points in a 129–122 loss to the Houston Rockets, setting a career high with his 18th 30-plus-point game of the season. Two days later, he recorded a season-high 41 points and a career-high 13 rebounds in a 114–106 win over the Boston Celtics. On January 19, DeRozan was named a starter on the Eastern Conference All-Star team for the 2017 NBA All-Star Game, becoming the fourth Raptors player to be named a starter after Vince Carter, Chris Bosh and Kyle Lowry. On February 6, 2017, after missing seven of the team's previous eight games with a sprained ankle, DeRozan shot 50 percent from the field and put up 31 points in a 118–109 win over the Los Angeles Clippers. On February 24, he scored a career-high 43 points to help the Raptors rally from a 17-point deficit to beat the Boston Celtics 107–97. DeRozan shot 15 of 28 from the floor as he surpassed his 42-point effort against the Houston Rockets on March 30, 2015. After scoring 42 points against Chicago on March 21, DeRozan scored 40 points against Miami two days later, thus registering back-to-back 40-point games for the first time in his career. On March 31, he scored 40 points in a 111–100 win over the Indiana Pacers. It was DeRozan's seventh 40-point game of the season and 30th game of 30 points or more, tying Vince Carter's 2000–01 franchise mark. With 38 points against Miami on April 7, DeRozan broke Carter's franchise record with his 31st 30-point game of the season. On April 9, DeRozan shot 11-for-15 from the field for 35 points against the New York Knicks and became the second player in franchise history with a 2,000-point season—Carter scored 2,107 in 1999–00 and 2,070 in 2000–01. The win over the Knicks was the Raptors' 50th of the season and helped them lock up at least the No. 3 seed in the Eastern Conference. DeRozan finished the season with a career-high 2,020 points, while his 27.3 average marked the second highest in franchise history—Carter averaged 27.6 in 2000–01.

On April 27, 2017, DeRozan scored 32 points in a 92–89 win over the Milwaukee Bucks, helping the Raptors take their first-round playoff series in six games. The Raptors went on to lose in a clean sweep to the Cavaliers in the second round. DeRozan appeared in all 10 playoff games, averaging 22.4 points, 4.9 rebounds, 3.4 assists and 1.4 steals per game. On May 18, 2017, DeRozan was named in the All-NBA Third Team for the first time in his career.

==== Final year in Toronto (2017–2018) ====
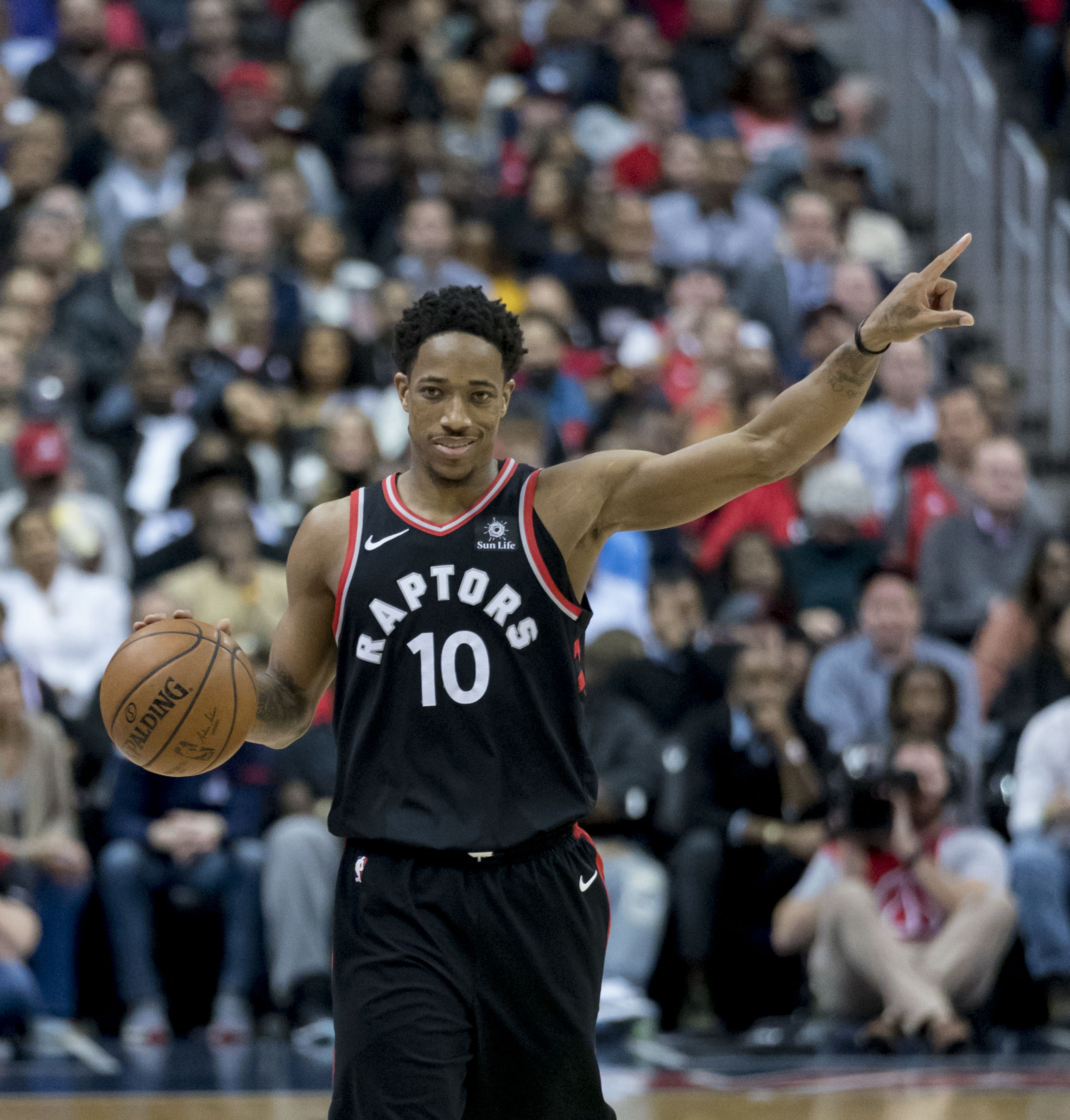
DeRozan in 2018

On November 3, 2017, DeRozan scored 37 points in a 109–100 win over the Utah Jazz, with 17 points and his third career four-point play coming in the third quarter. On December 13, 2017, he matched his season high with 37 points in a 115–109 win over the Phoenix Suns. On December 21, 2017, he set a career high with 45 points in a 114–109 win over the Philadelphia 76ers. He also set a career high with six 3-pointers in nine attempts. On January 1, 2018, DeRozan scored a franchise-record 52 points to help the Raptors beat the Milwaukee Bucks 131–127 in overtime, matching the team record with their 12th consecutive home victory. DeRozan was the first player in NBA history to score 50+ points on New Years Day. He also became the third player in Raptors history to score 50 or more in a single game—the others being Vince Carter and Terrence Ross, who each had 51. On January 8, 2018, he scored 35 points, including a go-ahead three-point play with 26.1 seconds left in overtime, to lift the Raptors to a 114–113 win over the Brooklyn Nets. On January 13, 2018, he had a 42-point effort in a 127–125 loss to the Golden State Warriors. On January 18, 2018, DeRozan was chosen to as an NBA All-Star starter for the second consecutive season, marking his fourth overall selection to the game, leaving him third overall in franchise history behind Vince Carter and Chris Bosh at the time, both of whom had been selected on five occasions. DeRozan joined Carter and Kyle Lowry as the only player with consecutive NBA All-Star Starter selections. On February 1, 2018, he was named Eastern Conference Player of the Month for January. On February 2, 2018, he scored 35 points in a 130–105 win over the Portland Trail Blazers. DeRozan made 11 of 22 shots and matched his career high by making six 3-pointers to finish 6 for 10 from long range. On March 7, 2018, he scored 42 points in a 121–119 overtime win over the Detroit Pistons.

In Game 2 of the Raptors' first-round playoff series against the Washington Wizards, DeRozan matched his career playoff-high with 37 points, as Toronto took a 2–0 lead in a playoff series for the first time in franchise history with a 130–119 win. It was his 12th career 30-point game in the postseason. In Game 4, DeRozan recorded 35 points, six assists, and six rebounds in a 106–98 loss. The Raptors went on to win the series in six games. In the second round, the Raptors were once again swept by the Cleveland Cavaliers. To add insult to injury, DeRozan was ejected for a flagrant 2 foul on Jordan Clarkson late in the 4th quarter in Game 4. This was his final game with Toronto. For the season, DeRozan was named to the All-NBA Second Team. DeRozan finished the 2017–18 season as the franchise leader in a number of categories, including regular season games played, wins, total minutes, field goals both attempted and made, and free throws both made and attempted. DeRozan received intensive criticism for his benching in Toronto's game 3 loss to Cleveland where Toronto would make a comeback with DeRozan on the bench.

=== San Antonio Spurs (2018–2021) ===
==== First-round playoff exit (2018–2019) ====
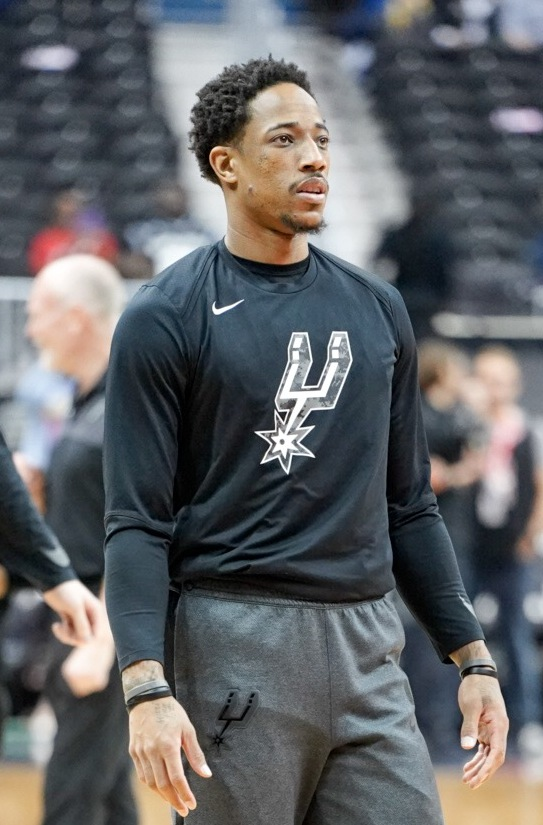
DeRozan with the Spurs in 2019

On July 18, 2018, DeRozan was traded, along with Jakob Poeltl and a protected 2019 first round draft pick, to the San Antonio Spurs in exchange for Kawhi Leonard and Danny Green. The trade was controversial because DeRozan was a fan favorite in Toronto and had not been consulted about the trade by Raptors president Masai Ujiri beforehand; however, there was a perception that DeRozan was not a strong playoff performer, and trading away DeRozan's large contract freed up significant salary cap space.

In his debut for the Spurs in their season opener on October 17, 2018, DeRozan had 28 points in a 112–108 win over the Minnesota Timberwolves. On October 22, he had 32 points and 14 assists in a 143–142 overtime win over the Los Angeles Lakers. On October 29, he had 34 points and nine assists in a 113–108 overtime win over the Dallas Mavericks. On November 3, he scored 26 points in a 109–95 win over the New Orleans Pelicans, thus scoring at least 25 points in seven of the team's first eight games. The only other San Antonio player to do so was George Gervin in 1978–79. On December 2, he had a season-high 36 points in a 131–118 win over the Portland Trail Blazers. On December 7, he recorded 36 points and nine assists in a 133–120 win over the Lakers. On January 3, he recorded his first career triple-double with 21 points, 14 rebounds and 11 assists in a 125–107 win over his former team, the Toronto Raptors. DeRozan also recorded his first double-double in a half. On February 22, he played his first game in Toronto in a Spurs uniform. He finished the game with 23 points, 4 rebounds and 8 assists.

On April 16, 2019, during Game 2 of the first round of the playoffs, DeRozan scored 31 points in a 105–114 loss to the Denver Nuggets. The Spurs would go on to lose the series in seven games. His old team the Raptors would go on to win the 2019 NBA Finals.

==== Back-to-back postseason absences (2019–2021) ====
On January 29, 2020, DeRozan scored a season-high 38 points, alongside five assists, in a 127–120 win over the Utah Jazz. On March 10, he logged a season-high 12 assists, along with 13 points, in a 119–109 win over the Dallas Mavericks. After the NBA season was suspended in March due to the COVID-19 pandemic, the Spurs were one of 22 teams invited to the NBA Bubble. However, after finishing with a record of 32–39, the team failed to qualify for the playoffs, marking the first time since 2013 that DeRozan's team did not reach the postseason.

On April 26, 2021, DeRozan scored a season-high 37 points, alongside ten assists, in a 146–143 overtime win over the Washington Wizards. Four days later, he logged a career-high tying 14 assists in a 140–143 overtime loss to the Boston Celtics. Although they qualified for the newly implemented play-in tournament, the Spurs suffered a 96–100 loss to the Memphis Grizzlies on May 19, eliminating the team from playoff contention for the second straight season.

=== Chicago Bulls (2021–2024) ===
==== Bounce-back and third All-NBA selection (2021–2022) ====
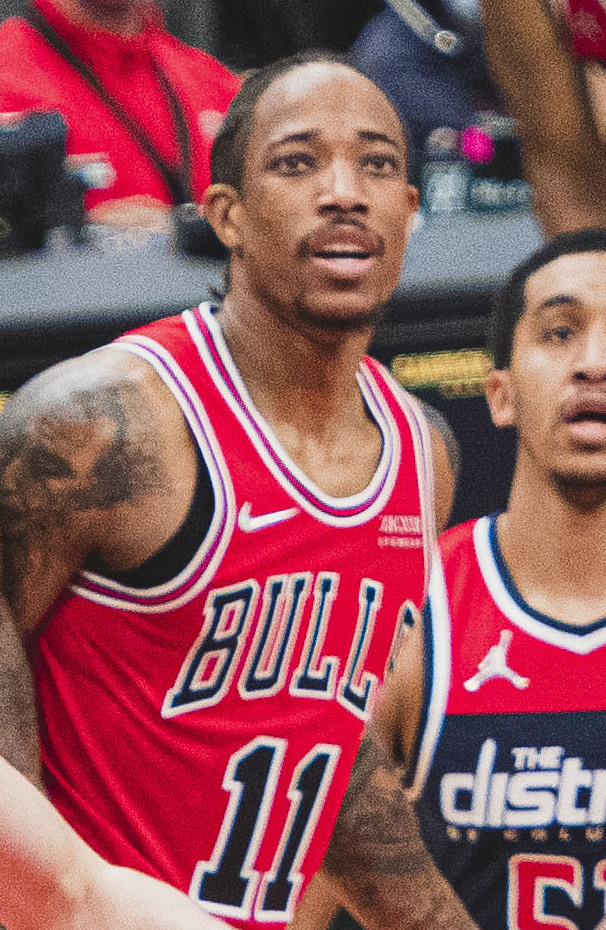
DeRozan with the Chicago Bulls in 2022

On August 11, 2021, DeRozan signed with the Chicago Bulls on a three-year, $85 million contract in a sign-and-trade deal; the Bulls sent Thaddeus Young, Al-Farouq Aminu, a protected first-round draft pick, and two second-round draft picks to the Spurs in exchange. As his usual number 10 was retired by the Bulls in honor of Bob Love, DeRozan switched to wear number 11.

On October 20, DeRozan made his Bulls debut, putting up 17 points, seven rebounds, two assists, and three steals in a 94–88 win over the Detroit Pistons. On November 1, he scored a then season-high 37 points on 15-of-20 shooting, along with 7 rebounds, to lead the Bulls to a 128–114 comeback victory over the Boston Celtics, overcoming a 19-point deficit on the road. He would match those 37 points two days later, while grabbing 10 rebounds, in a 103–98 loss to the Philadelphia 76ers.

On December 31, DeRozan hit a game-winning one-legged three at the buzzer to award the Bulls a 108–106 road victory over the Indiana Pacers, on a night where he recorded 28 points and six assists. On January 1, 2022, DeRozan had 28 points, and made yet another game-winning three-pointer at the buzzer, giving Chicago a 120–119 road victory over the Washington Wizards, and becoming the first player in NBA history with a game-winning buzzer beater on consecutive days.

On January 23, DeRozan scored a then season-high 41 points on 15-of-21 shooting from the field in a 114–95 loss to the Orlando Magic. On January 27, DeRozan was selected to his 5th NBA All-Star Game, his third start and his first All-Star Selection since 2018 where he started in his hometown for the 2018 NBA All-Star Game. On February 6, DeRozan scored a then season-high 45 points, along with 9 rebounds and 7 assists, in a 119–108 loss to the Philadelphia 76ers. On February 14, DeRozan scored 19 of his 40 points in the fourth quarter and delivered 7 assists in a 120–109 win over his former team, the San Antonio Spurs. This was his sixth straight 35-point game, breaking Michael Jordan's franchise record of five straight 35-point games; he also tied Wilt Chamberlain's record of the longest consecutive streaks of such games while shooting at least 50 percent (DeRozan shot 50, 59.3, 60, 63.6, 66.7, and 68.4 percent). On February 16, in a 125–118 victory over the Sacramento Kings, DeRozan broke the record by scoring 38 points, with 6 rebounds and 6 assists, to become the first player in NBA history to score 35 or more points and shoot 50 percent or better in seven consecutive games. By the end of February, the Bulls were in contention for the best record in the East and DeRozan was considered a MVP frontrunner.

The 2022 NBA All-Star Game in Cleveland was DeRozan's third time as a starter and the first since 2018, and fifth selection overall. Selected by LeBron James, his squad defeated Kevin Durant's 163–160. On February 24, in a 112–108 victory over the Atlanta Hawks, DeRozan scored 37 points, including the winning basket, and he pushed his league mark of scoring at least 35 points while shooting 50% or better to eight consecutive games. On February 27, DeRozan scored 31 points and grabbed 7 rebounds in a 116–110 loss to the Memphis Grizzlies; it marked DeRozan's tenth consecutive 30-point game, the longest such streak by a Bulls player since Michael Jordan in 1990–91; as DeRozan shot 10 of 29 from the field, this game ending his NBA-record run of eight games of scoring at least 35 while shooting 50% or better, and was ejected in the closing seconds. On March 3, DeRozan was named Eastern Conference Player of the Month for February; it was his fourth career Player of the Month nod. On March 31, DeRozan scored 27 of his season-high 50 points in the 4th quarter and overtime (just two points shy of his career high), along with 5 rebounds and 6 assists, in a 135–130 overtime win over the Los Angeles Clippers. DeRozan finished the regular season as the NBA leading scorer in the fourth quarter with 612 points. On April 20, during Game 2 of the first round of the playoffs, DeRozan scored a career playoff-high 41 points in a 114–110 win over the reigning champions Milwaukee Bucks. The Bulls would go on to lose to the Bucks in five games.

==== 20,000 points (2022–2024) ====
Since the 2022–23 season, DeRozan has joined an elite group of players to reach 20,000 points in their career. On October 19, DeRozan posted 37 points, 6 rebounds, and 9 assists in a 116–108 win over the Miami Heat, making him and Michael Jordan the only players in Bulls history to tally at least 35 points, five rebounds, and five assists in a season opener. On October 28, DeRozan scored 33 points in a 129–124 loss against his former team, the San Antonio Spurs, and he became just the 50th player in NBA history to achieve 20,000 career points. On November 4, DeRozan scored a then season-high 46 points in a 123–119 loss to the Boston Celtics. On December 28, DeRozan recorded 42 points, 10 rebounds, 5 assists, 2 steals, and 2 blocks in an 119–113 overtime win over the Milwaukee Bucks.

On January 2, 2023, DeRozan scored 44 points in a 145–134 overtime loss against the Cleveland Cavaliers. On February 2, DeRozan was selected to play as an Eastern Conference reserve in the 2023 NBA All-Star Game, his second consecutive selection as a member of the Bulls. On March 17, DeRozan put up season highs 49 points and 14 rebounds, while Zach LaVine put up 39 points, in a 139–131 win over the Minnesota Timberwolves. Their 88 combined points surpassed Michael Jordan and Horace Grant's previous record of 85, to become the most points scored in a game by a duo in Bulls history.

On December 12, 2023, DeRozan passed Clyde Drexler for 35th in the NBA All-Time Scoring List in a loss to the Denver Nuggets. On March 13, 2024, DeRozan scored a season-high 46 points and grabbed 9 rebounds in a 132–129 overtime win over the Indiana Pacers. He also passed Elgin Baylor, Dwyane Wade, and Adrian Dantley to enter 32nd place on the NBA All-Time Scoring List. He made a fadeaway midrange shot at the buzzer in the same game to send it into overtime. DeRozan finished the season as the runner-up for the Clutch Player of the Year award.

=== Sacramento Kings (2024–2026) ===
On July 8, 2024, DeRozan signed with the Sacramento Kings on a three-year, $74 million contract in a sign-and-trade deal that also involved one of his former teams, the San Antonio Spurs, with Chris Duarte, RaiQuan Gray and draft considerations to going to Chicago and Harrison Barnes to San Antonio.

On February 10, 2025, DeRozan scored a season-high 42 points, including a baseline floater with 2 seconds left in overtime to lead the Kings to a 129–128 win over the Dallas Mavericks. On March 20, DeRozan scored 22 points in a 128–116 loss to the Chicago Bulls, becoming the 27th player to achieve 25,000 career points. On April 11, DeRozan moved past Reggie Miller into 25th place on the NBA All-Time Scoring List. DeRozan finished the season averaging 22.2 points per game and in the process became just the sixth player in NBA history (Kareem Abdul-Jabbar, Karl Malone, Kobe Bryant, Dirk Nowitzki, LeBron James) to average 20+ points per game in 12 or more straight seasons (minimum 60 games played per season).

On January 14, 2026, DeRozan recorded 27 points, six rebounds and five assists in a 112–101 win over the New York Knicks. He passed Kevin Garnett to move into 22nd place on the NBA’s all-time scoring list. On February 26, DeRozan moved into 20th place on the NBA’s all-time scoring list, surpassing John Havlicek and Paul Pierce during a 130–121 win over the Dallas Mavericks. On March 15, DeRozan scored a season-high 41 points and recorded 11 assists to lead the Kings to a 116–111 victory over the Utah Jazz. With the performance, he became the oldest player in NBA history to record a 40-point, 10-assist game. On April 5, DeRozan moved into 16th place on the NBA’s all-time scoring list, surpassing Oscar Robertson during a 138–109 loss to the Los Angeles Clippers.

DeRozan started 77 total games for Sacramento during the 2025–26 season, recording averages of 18.4 points, 2.9 rebounds, and 4.1 assists. On July 6, 2026, DeRozan was waived by the Kings.

=== Denver Nuggets (2026–present) ===
On September 8, 2026, DeRozan signed a one–year, $3.9 million contract with the Denver Nuggets.

On October 22, DeRozan made his Nuggets debut, putting up 13 points off the bench in a 96–84 loss to the Oklahoma City Thunder.

== Career statistics ==
Legend
GP	Games played	GS	Games started	MPG	Minutes per game
FG%	Field goal percentage	3P%	3-point field goal percentage	FT%	Free throw percentage
RPG	Rebounds per game	APG	Assists per game	SPG	Steals per game
BPG	Blocks per game	PPG	Points per game	**Bold**	Career high
*	Led the league

=== NBA ===
==== Regular season ====
Year	Team	GP	GS	MPG	FG%	3P%	FT%	RPG	APG	SPG	BPG	PPG
2009–10	Toronto	77	65	21.6	.498	.250	.763	2.9	.7	.6	.2	8.6
2010–11	Toronto	**82***	**82***	34.8	.467	.096	.813	3.8	1.8	1.0	.4	17.2
2011–12	Toronto	63	63	35.0	.422	.261	.810	3.3	2.0	.8	.3	16.7
2012–13	Toronto	**82***	**82***	36.7	.445	.283	.831	3.9	2.5	.9	.3	18.1
2013–14	Toronto	79	79	**38.2**	.429	.305	.824	4.3	4.0	1.1	.4	22.7
2014–15	Toronto	60	60	35.0	.413	.284	.832	4.6	3.6	**1.2**	.2	20.1
2015–16	Toronto	78	78	35.9	.446	.338	.850	4.5	4.0	1.0	.3	23.5
2016–17	Toronto	74	74	35.4	.467	.266	.842	5.2	3.9	1.1	.2	27.3
2017–18	Toronto	80	80	33.9	.456	.310	.825	3.9	5.2	1.1	.3	23.0
2018–19	San Antonio	77	77	34.9	.481	.156	.830	**6.0**	6.2	1.1	.5	21.2
2019–20	San Antonio	68	68	34.1	**.531**	.257	.845	5.5	5.6	1.0	.3	22.1
2020–21	San Antonio	61	61	33.7	.495	.257	**.880**	4.2	**6.9**	.9	.2	21.6
2021–22	Chicago	76	76	36.1	.504	**.352**	.877	5.2	4.9	.9	.3	**27.9**
2022–23	Chicago	74	74	36.2	.504	.324	.872	4.6	5.1	1.1	.5	24.5
2023–24	Chicago	79	79	37.8*	.480	.333	.853	4.3	5.3	1.1	**.6**	24.0
2024–25	Sacramento	77	77	35.9	.477	.328	.857	3.9	4.4	.8	.4	22.2
2025–26	Sacramento	77	77	31.2	.497	.320	.868	2.9	4.1	1.0	.3	18.4
Career		1,264	1,252	34.5	.471	.302	.843	4.3	4.1	1.0	.3	21.1
All-Star		6	3	21.2	.563	.125	.800	4.2	3.7	.8	.0	13.5

==== Playoffs ====
Year	Team	GP	GS	MPG	FG%	3P%	FT%	RPG	APG	SPG	BPG	PPG
2014	Toronto	7	7	40.3	.385	.333	**.899**	4.1	3.6	1.1	.3	**23.9**
2015	Toronto	4	4	39.8	.400	**.375**	.824	6.3	**5.8**	1.5	.0	20.3
2016	Toronto	**20**	**20**	37.3	.394	.154	.813	4.2	2.7	1.1	.2	20.9
2017	Toronto	10	10	37.3	.434	.067	.888	4.9	3.4	1.4	.0	22.4
2018	Toronto	10	10	35.4	.437	.286	.811	3.6	4.0	.5	**.6**	22.7
2019	San Antonio	7	7	35.9	**.487**	.000	.864	**6.7**	4.6	1.1	.1	22.0
2022	Chicago	5	5	**40.6**	.411	.000	.867	5.4	4.8	**1.8**	.4	20.8
Career		63	63	37.6	.418	.214	.852	4.7	3.7	1.1	.2	21.8

=== College ===
Year	Team	GP	GS	MPG	FG%	3P%	FT%	RPG	APG	SPG	BPG	PPG
2008–09	USC	35	35	33.4	.523	.167	.646	5.7	1.5	.9	.4	13.9

== NBA career records ==
=== Toronto Raptors franchise records ===
==== Regular season ====
- Most games played (675)
- Most minutes played (22,986)
- Most points scored (13,296)
- Most field goals (4716)
- Most 2-point field goals (4391)
- Most free throws made (3539)

== Awards and honors ==
=== High school and college ===
- 2006 All-Moore League First Team
- 2007 All-Moore League First Team
- 2007 Named to the Los Angeles Times First Team
- 2008 Parade Magazine All-America First Team
- 2008 Long Beach Press-Telegram's Best in the West First Team
- 2008 McDonald's High School All-American
- 2008 Jordan Brand All-American Classic
- 2008 Southern California Interscholastic Basketball Coaches Association I-AA Player of the Year (tied with two others)
- 2008 All-State Team
- 2009 Pac-10 Tournament Champion
- 2009 Named Most Outstanding Player in Pac-10 Tournament
- No. 10 retired by USC Trojans

=== NBA achievements ===
- All-NBA Second Team: 2018, 2022
- All-NBA Third Team: 2017
- NBA All-Star: 2014, 2016, 2017, 2018, 2022, 2023
- NBA All-Star Rising Star: 2011
- NBA minutes played leaders: (2024)
- Magic Johnson Award: 2018
- NBA Eastern Conference Player of the Month: April 2015, January 2016, January 2018, February 2022
- NBA Eastern Conference Player of the Week: December 7–13, 2015; November 7–13, 2016; December 12–18, 2016; January 9–15, 2017; March 20–26, 2017; November 13–19, 2017; December 18–24, 2017; January 1–7, 2018; February 26 – March 4, 2018; November 29 - December 5, 2021; December 27, 2021 - January 2, 2022; February 7–13, 2022; March 4–10, 2024
- NBA Western Conference Player of the Week: January 6–12, 2020

== National team career ==
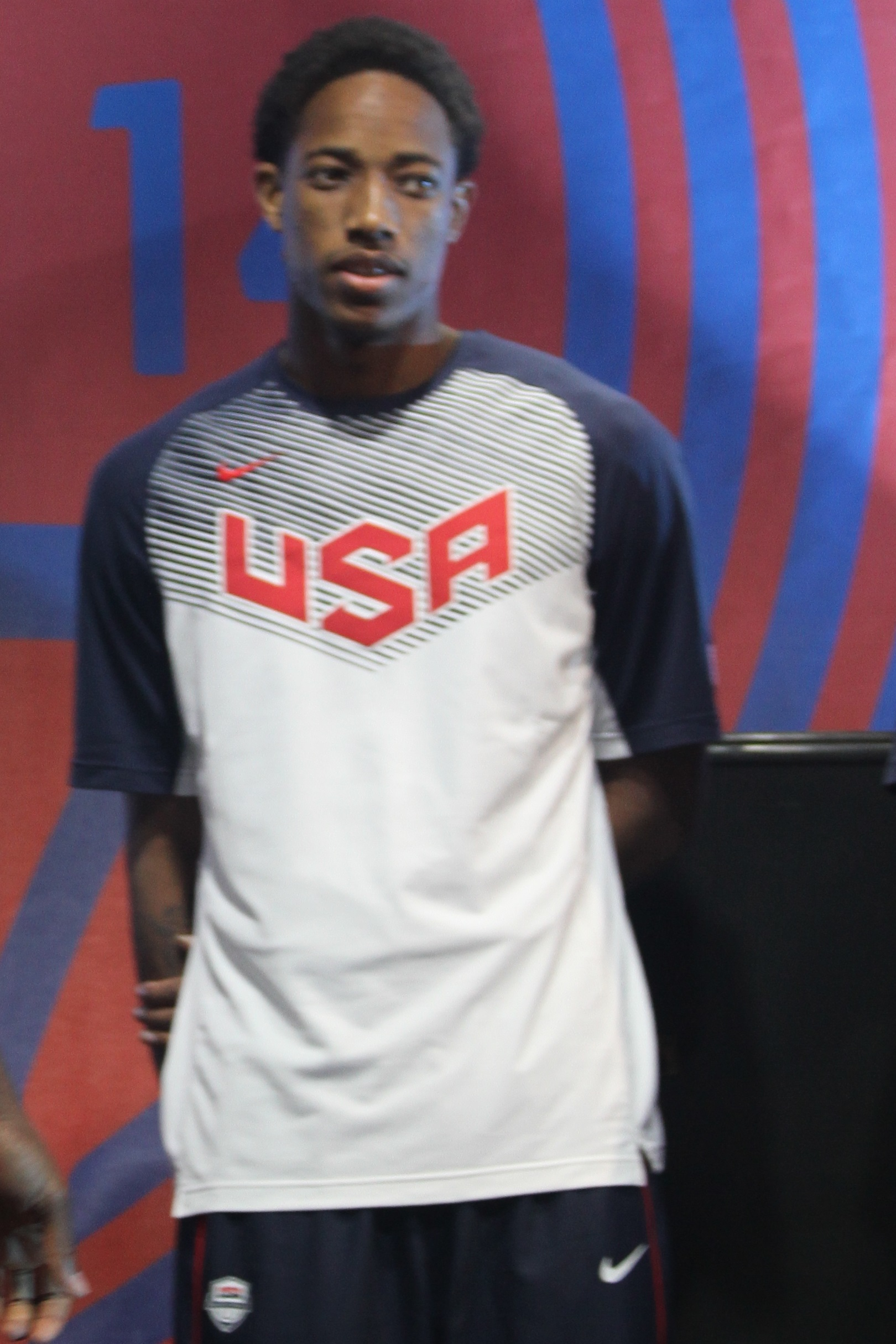
DeRozan with Team USA at the 2014 World Basketball Festival

DeRozan was a member of the United States national team that won the gold medal in the 2014 FIBA Basketball World Cup. In nine games, he averaged 4.8 points, 1.0 rebounds and 1.2 assists per game. He made a second appearance for Team USA at the 2016 Summer Olympics. DeRozan averaged 6.6 points, 1.4 rebounds and 0.9 assists in seven games for Team USA in helping them win the Olympic gold medal.

== Personal life ==
DeRozan is the son of Frank and Diane DeRozan. DeRozan's mother was diagnosed with lupus when he was a small child. While with the Raptors, DeRozan helped raise awareness and educate Canadians on the disease in part by partnering with Lupus Canada. DeRozan lost his father Frank DeRozan on February 19, 2021 after battling several longtime health issues. He said he would regularly fly to Los Angeles from San Antonio or any city he was playing in to be by his side throughout his last moments.

DeRozan has a daughter born in 2013 named Diar, who gained national attention in 2023 after consistently shrieking during free throws in the Bulls' play-in tournament game against the Toronto Raptors. The Raptors shot just 18-of-36 from the free throw line, with many calling Diar an integral piece of the Bulls' 109–105 victory. After the game, Raptors forward Scottie Barnes admitted that the screaming had an impact on Toronto's free throw shooting. Diar later received several online threats.

DeRozan has openly struggled with depression, and is an advocate for others suffering with it. After DeRozan and fellow NBA player Kevin Love spoke publicly on mental health it prompted the NBA to add a new rule that requires a team to have at least one full time licensed mental health professional on their staff. The duo also appeared in a PSA video by the NBA that launched the new mental health professional program alongside a new website with various mental health resources. In 2024, DeRozan's book, Above the Noise: My Story of Chasing Calm, was published by Harmony Books. The book describes his experiences with depression, growth, and the slow process of healing.

DeRozan is nicknamed "Deebo" after the character from the 1995 film Friday. He received the name as a sixth grader when he beat up an eighth grader during a basketball game at school. DeRozan has reflected on the awareness of his neighborhood nickname: "When people call me that, you have to know me from back home, so when it started carrying over to the NBA, I was just like I don't know how it got to the league."

DeRozan was mentioned in "Not Like Us", a diss track by the American rapper and fellow Compton native Kendrick Lamar, amidst his highly publicized feud with the Canadian rapper Drake in May 2024. He was invited on stage during the 2024 The Pop Out: Ken & Friends concert held on Juneteenth, where Lamar first performed "Not Like Us" live, along with fellow NBA player and Los Angeles area native Russell Westbrook. DeRozan additionally had a cameo in the music video of "Not Like Us", which was symbolically released on July 4, 2024. It won the 67th Grammy Award for Best Music Video.

DeRozan got into an altercation with a fan at a sushi restaurant on April 19, 2025, after the fan shone the light from his phone in DeRozan's face.

== See also ==
- List of NBA career scoring leaders
- List of NBA franchise career scoring leaders
- List of NBA career minutes played leaders
- List of NBA career games played leaders
