= Zziwa =

Zziwa is a surname. Notable people with the surname include:

- Keiran Zziwa (born 1997), Canadian-Ugandan professional basketball player
- Margaret Zziwa (born 1963), Ugandan politician and legislator
- Joseph Anthony Zziwa (born 1956), Ugandan Roman Catholic prelate
