= St Mary's Roman Catholic High School =

St Mary's Roman Catholic High School may refer to:

- St Mary's Roman Catholic High School, Chesterfield
- St Mary's Roman Catholic High School, Lugwardine
- St Mary's Roman Catholic High School, Croydon
