= Luol Deng =

British basketball player (born 1985)

Luol Deng OBE
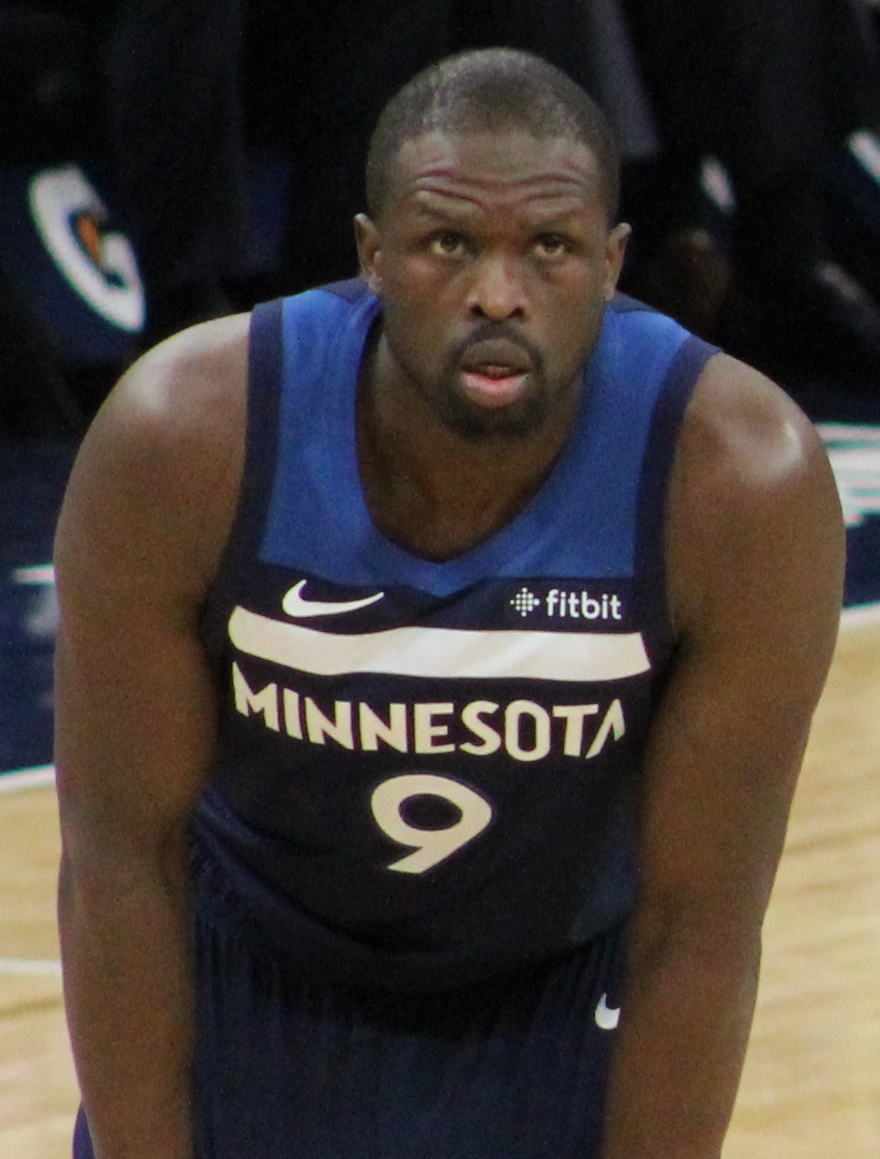
- Deng with the Minnesota Timberwolves in 2019

Personal information
- Born: 16 April 1985 (age 41) Wau, South Sudan
- Listed height: 6 ft 9 in (2.06 m)
- Listed weight: 237 lb (108 kg)

Career information
- High school: St Mary's Roman Catholic (Croydon, London); Blair Academy (Blairstown, New Jersey)
- College: Duke (2003–2004)
- NBA draft: 2004: 1st round, 7th overall pick
- Drafted by: Phoenix Suns
- Playing career: 2004–2019
- Position: Small forward / power forward
- Number: 9

Career history
- 2004–2014: Chicago Bulls
- 2014: Cleveland Cavaliers
- 2014–2016: Miami Heat
- 2016–2018: Los Angeles Lakers
- 2018–2019: Minnesota Timberwolves

Career highlights
- 2× NBA All-Star (2012, 2013); NBA All-Defensive Second Team (2012); NBA All-Rookie First Team (2005); USBWA National Freshman of the Year (2004); Third-team All-ACC (2004); First-team Parade All-American (2003); McDonald's All-American (2003)

Career NBA statistics
- Points: 13,361 (14.8 ppg)
- Rebounds: 5,468 (6.1 rpg)
- Assists: 2,042 (2.3 apg)
- Stats at NBA.com
- Stats at Basketball Reference

Luol Ajou Deng OBE (born 16 April 1985) is a South Sudanese–British former professional basketball player. He was a two-time NBA All-Star and was named to the NBA All-Defensive Second Team in 2012. Born in South Sudan, then part of Sudan, Deng fled the country with his family as a child, eventually settling in the United Kingdom. He became a British citizen in 2006, and has played for the Great Britain national team.

After playing college basketball for the Duke Blue Devils, Deng was selected by the Phoenix Suns in the first round of the 2004 NBA draft with the seventh overall pick. He was named to the NBA All-Rookie First Team as a 19-year-old in 2005. The small forward was an All-Star with the Bulls in 2012 and 2013 before splitting the 2013–14 season with the Cleveland Cavaliers. After just half a season with Cleveland, Deng joined the Miami Heat for 2014–15. He played two seasons for the Heat before signing with the Lakers in 2016. He spent his last season with the Minnesota Timberwolves.

Deng has been the president of the South Sudan Basketball Federation since 2019. He is an assistant coach for the South Sudan men's national basketball team and has previously served as its head coach.

== Early life ==
Deng was born in Wau, Sudan (present-day South Sudan), and is a member of the Dinka ethnic group. When he was young, his father Aldo, a member of the Sudanese parliament, moved the family to Egypt to escape the Second Sudanese Civil War. In Egypt, they met former NBA player Manute Bol, another Dinka, who taught Deng's older brother, Ajou Deng, how to play basketball and also mentored Luol. When they were granted political asylum, his family immigrated to Brixton in South London.

Deng was educated at St Mary's Roman Catholic High School, a voluntary aided state comprehensive school in Croydon in South London. He developed an interest in football, admiring Faustino Asprilla of Newcastle United F.C., but also continued to play basketball and was invited to join England's under-15 team. During this time, he began his career at the Brixton TopCats. At Brixton, Deng was coached by Jimmy Rogers, who convinced him to play basketball. He represented Croydon at the London Youth Games and was inducted into their Hall of Fame. At age 13, he played for the England under-18 team in the 1998 FIBA Europe Under-18 Championship qualifying tournament, averaging 40 points and 14 rebounds, and was named the most valuable player (MVP) of the tournament. Next, he led England to the finals of the European Junior National Tournament, where he averaged (34) points and earned another MVP award.

At age 14, Deng moved to the United States to play basketball at Blair Academy in New Jersey. One of his teammates was future NBA player Charlie Villanueva. Deng was also named a tri-captain at Blair along with Villanueva. During his senior year, Deng was considered the second most promising high school senior in the United States after LeBron James and was named First Team All-America by Parade and USA Today. He was selected to play in the McDonald's High School All-America game, but could not play due to a foot injury.

Considered a five-star recruit by Rivals.com, Deng was listed as the no. 1 small forward and the no. 2 player in the nation in 2003.

== College career ==
Deng accepted an athletic scholarship to attend Duke University, where he played for coach Mike Krzyzewski's Duke Blue Devils basketball team in 2003–04. In one season at Duke, he appeared in 37 games and made 32 starts. He averaged 30.1 minutes and 15.1 points per game en route to a berth in the 2004 Final Four. He was the 10th freshman in the Atlantic Coast Conference (ACC) history to lead all freshmen in scoring, rebounding, and field goal percentage.

== Professional career ==
=== Chicago Bulls (2004–2014) ===
==== 2004–05 season ====
After one year at Duke, Deng entered the 2004 NBA draft. He was picked seventh overall by the Phoenix Suns, but was immediately traded to the Chicago Bulls by prior agreement. Deng suffered a season-ending wrist injury late in his rookie season, but still made the NBA All-Rookie First Team and helped the resurgent Bulls return to the playoffs for the first time in seven years. Deng played in 61 games and averaged 11.7 points per game. On 8 February 2005, Deng recorded his first double-double in a 107–100 win against the Dallas Mavericks.

==== 2005–06 season ====
In his second season, he posted strong performances throughout March and April 2006, to help the Bulls earn their second consecutive playoff berth. His offensive statistics improved in his sophomore season, increasing his scoring to 14.3 points per game, and increasing his rebounding to 6.6 per game, up from a 5.3 average in his rookie season. Deng had four straight double-double performances from 28 February to 5 March, with at least 10 points and rebounds in each game. In the playoffs, the Bulls faced off against the Miami Heat in a seven-game series. Deng came off the bench in all six games, averaging 10 points per game.

==== 2006–07 season ====
For the 2006–07 season, Deng was the only Bulls player to start all 82 regular season games. His statistics continued to improve, and he led the team in minutes played (37.5) and field goal percentage (.517), while playing a strong second scoring option to Ben Gordon, with a marked improvement to 18.8 points per game. Deng also notably rarely committed fouls on defense (2.00 per game), despite the minutes he played and frequently being outsized in matchups against power forwards such as Kevin Garnett.

On 27 December 2006, Deng was driving in the lane when Miami Heat's James Posey grabbed him, causing concern that Deng may have re-injured his wrist. Posey earned a flagrant foul, was ejected and suspended for one game. Deng scored 32 points against the Cleveland Cavaliers just three nights later, resolving concern that the wrist would be re-injured. On 26 March 2007, Deng posted a new career-high 38 points to lead the Bulls to a 100–89 victory against the Portland Trail Blazers. Deng converted 18 of his 25 shots from the field. On 3 May, Deng won the NBA Sportsmanship Award. For that award, the league donated $25,000 on his behalf to Pacific Garden Mission, the oldest continuously operating rescue mission in the country.

==== 2007–08 season ====
Near the beginning of the 2007–08 season, the Bulls started negotiating a contract extension with Deng. Negotiations were mostly handled by Bulls chairman Jerry Reinsdorf. The team offered Deng a five-year extension for $57.5 million. However, Deng decided to reject the deal and wait until the season ended to continue negotiations.

In the 2007–08 season, Deng played in 63 games, missing 19 mostly because of left Achilles tendinitis. Despite injuries, he averaged 17.0 points per game and 6.3 rebounds per game. He had his best game of the season against the Milwaukee Bucks when he scored 32 points in a 151–135 victory. The Bulls missed the playoffs in the 2007–08 season for the first time since 2004.

==== 2008–09 season ====
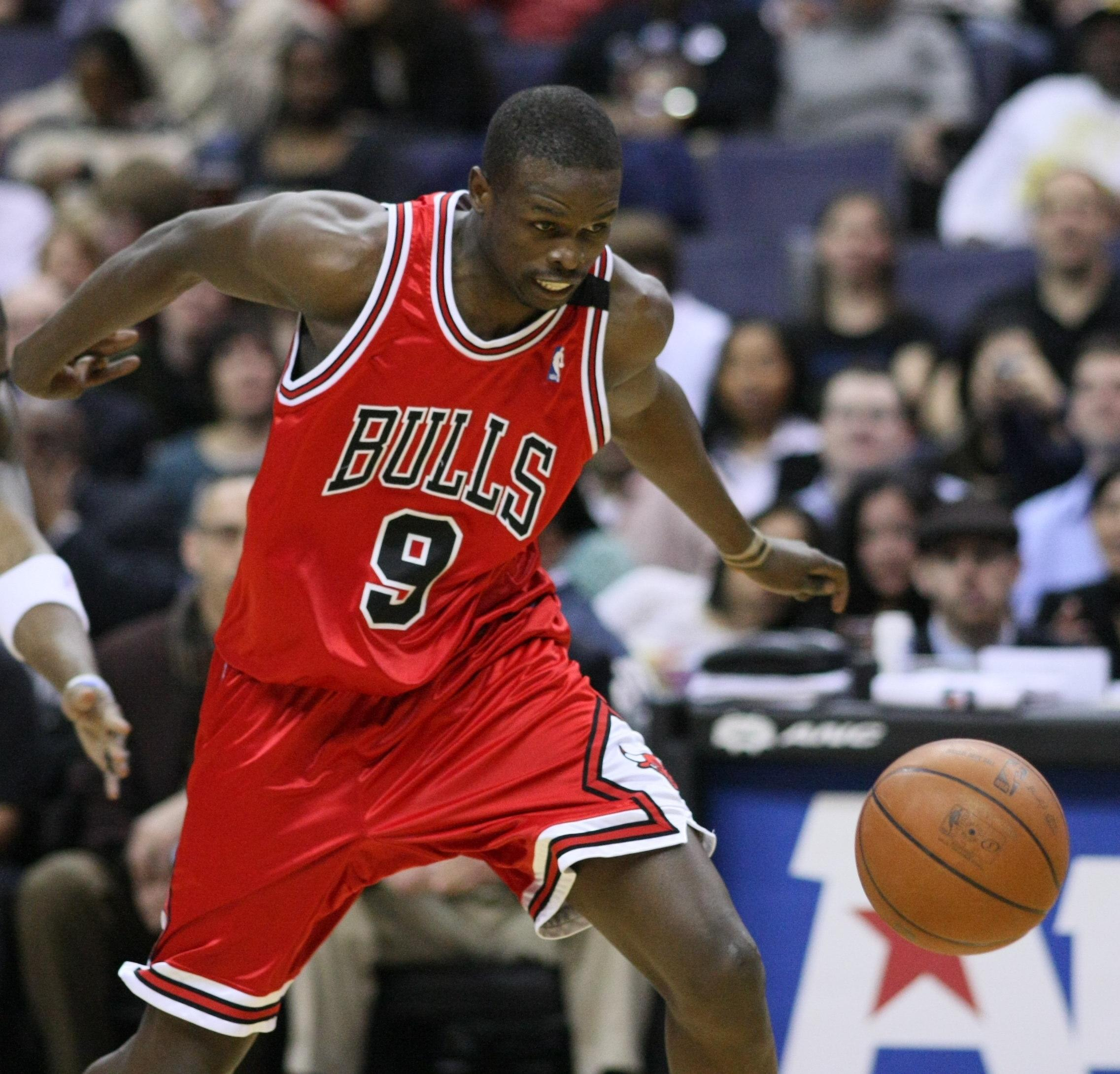
Deng with Chicago in 2009

Before the 2008–09 season started, Deng agreed to a contract extension for six years and $71 million. After the agreement was announced, Bulls general manager John Paxson said in a statement "Signing Luol has always been a priority for this organization and we have always felt that he was a big part of our future. We are very happy that Luol will now be with us long term as we continue to grow as an organization."

Due to injury, Deng played in 48 games. During the regular season his scoring dropped to 14.1 points per game and his rebounding dropped to 6.0 per game. The Bulls made the playoffs, but Deng missed the 2009 playoffs due to injury.

==== 2009–10 season ====
Deng played in a total of 70 games during the 2009–10 season, also increasing his scoring and rebounding to 17.6 and 7.3 respectively, helping the Bulls make the playoffs again. He missed 11 straight games at the end of March 2010, because of a sprained right calf.

During the first round of the 2010 playoffs, Deng averaged 18.8 points along with 5.0 rebounds per game against the Cleveland Cavaliers. He scored 26 points in the final game of the series, but could not prevent the Bulls from being eliminated by the Cavaliers.

==== 2010–11 season ====
On 1 November 2010, Deng scored a new career-high 40 points, hitting 14 of his 19 shots, along with 9 of 11 free throws, against the Portland Trail Blazers, scoring a point a minute. On 24 February 2011, he recorded 20 points, 10 rebounds, and hit the game winning three-point shot with 16 seconds left in a game against the Miami Heat. Throughout the season, Deng significantly improved his three-point shooting after coach Tom Thibodeau asked him to. In the past four seasons, Deng attempted 132 three-point shots, whereas during this season he attempted 333, making 115.

Deng finished the season averaging 17.4 points and 5.8 rebounds per game, being the third scorer for the Bulls behind Derrick Rose (25.0) and Carlos Boozer (17.5). During the first round of the 2011 playoffs against the Indiana Pacers, Deng averaged 18.6 points and 6.2 rebounds per game, being the second leading scorer of the team behind Derrick Rose.

On 31 March 2011, Eric Bressman of Dime magazine called Deng "the most underrated player" writing he was "never the face of the franchise but always the backbone". Coach Thibodeau has consistently called Deng the "glue" that holds the Bulls together. "Luol's professional. He practices hard. He prepares well. He studies his opponent. He's great at executing offensively and defensively. He's helped this team get better every day," said Thibodeau.

Deng was the Bulls' second leading scorer during the playoffs. In the first game of the Eastern Conference finals against the Miami Heat, Deng was praised for his defense on LeBron James. However, the Heat went on to eliminate the Bulls in five games. Deng averaged just under 43 minutes, 16.9 points, 6.6 rebounds and 2.7 assists per game during the 2011 playoffs.

==== 2011–12 season: All-Star season ====
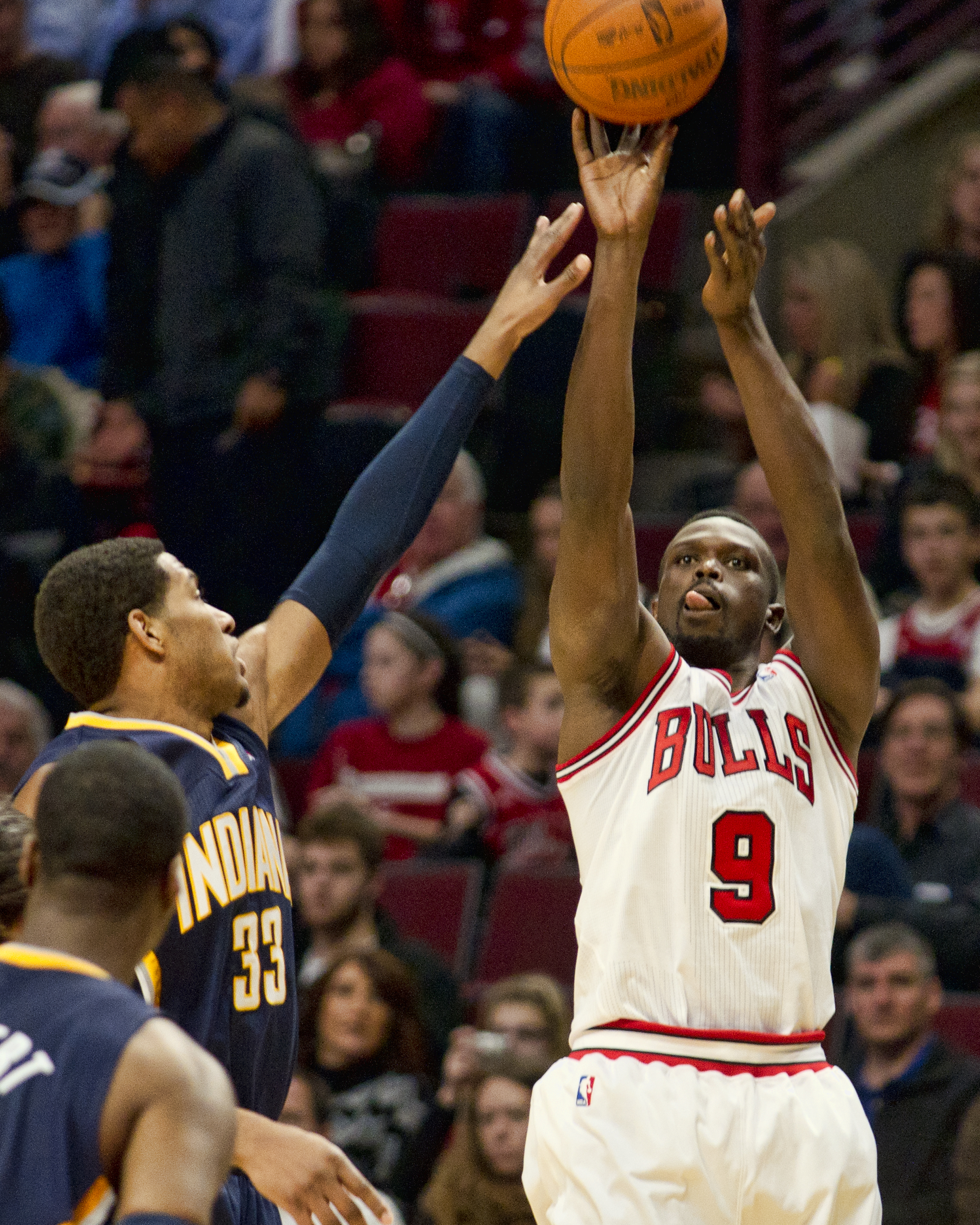
Deng shooting a jump shot in a game with the Bulls

Deng injured his wrist during the fourth quarter against the Charlotte Bobcats on 21 January 2012. Initially thought to be a minor injury, it was later revealed by a magnetic resonance imaging (MRI) that Deng tore the ligament in his left wrist. He decided to postpone surgery and play the rest of the 2011–12 season through the pain. He returned to the starting line-up against the Milwaukee Bucks on 4 February 2012, scoring 21 points with 9 rebounds, 1 steal, and 1 block. On 9 February, Deng was selected as a reserve for the 2012 NBA All-Star Game, joining teammate Derrick Rose, who was voted in as a starter. This was the first time since 1997 (when both Michael Jordan and Scottie Pippen made the team) that the Bulls had two All-Stars in the NBA All-Star Game. Deng made a buzzer-beating game winner on 24 March, off a tip-in basket to lift the Bulls 102–101 in overtime versus the Toronto Raptors. At the end of the season, Deng was selected for the NBA All-Defensive Second Team.

==== 2012–13 season: Second All-Star season ====
Deng was selected as a reserve for the 2013 NBA All-Star Game, along with Joakim Noah. During the 2012–13 season, he averaged a team-high 16.5 points, 6.3 rebounds, and a career-high 3 assists per game. His free throw percentage of .816 was also a career high. He again led the league in minutes per game with (38.7). Even without Derrick Rose, who was out for the whole year due to an ACL injury, the Bulls still tallied a 45–37 record, finishing fifth in the Eastern Conference and second in the Central Division.

The Bulls met the Brooklyn Nets in the first round of the 2013 playoffs, and defeated the Nets in seven games. They then met the Miami Heat in the conference semi-finals. The Heat defeated the Bulls in five games. The Heat went on to win the 2013 NBA Finals. During the 2013 playoffs, Deng averaged 13.8 points, 7.6 rebounds, and 3.8 assists in 44.8 minutes per game.

==== 2013–14 season ====
Deng's representatives and Bulls executives had informal talks about extending his contract over the summer, but the team never made a formal offer. Deng's contract was set to expire after the 2013–14 season, and he sought a new contract close to $12 million a year over 4–5 seasons. Rumors about him being traded continued throughout the season.

During the first months of the season, Deng again emerged as the Bulls leading scorer with the absence of Derrick Rose. He had his best performances on 27 and 30 November 2013, when he scored 27 points against the Detroit Pistons and the Cleveland Cavaliers in two separate games. He also registered six rebounds against the Pistons, and 11 assists against the Cavaliers. During the first two months of the season, Deng averaged a career-high of 19 points and 3.7 assists per game, and also averaged 6.9 rebounds per game.

=== Cleveland Cavaliers (2014) ===
On 7 January 2014, the Chicago Bulls traded Deng to the Cleveland Cavaliers for Andrew Bynum, two future second-round draft picks in 2015 and 2016 (initially traded from the Trail Blazers to the Cavaliers), a protected future pick the Cavaliers received from the Sacramento Kings, and the right to swap first-round picks with the Cavaliers in the 2015 draft. At the time of the trade, Deng was the fifth-longest tenured Bulls player, and fourth-leading scorer in franchise history.

In his Cavaliers debut, Deng had 10 points, one rebound, one steal, and four turnovers in 21 minutes. Two games later, he scored 27 points with five rebounds, four assists, and one block. This was his highest-scoring game with the Cavaliers. Deng finished the season averaging 14.1 points and 2.5 assists.

=== Miami Heat (2014–2016) ===
On 15 July 2014, Deng signed with the Miami Heat. He had his best scoring game of the 2014–15 season on 20 January 2015, when he scored 29 points against the Philadelphia 76ers. Deng finished the season averaging 14 points and 5.2 rebounds per game.

On 29 June 2015, Deng exercised his player option for the 2015–16 season. On 1 August, Deng played for Team Africa at the 2015 NBA Africa exhibition game. In late November and early December 2015, Deng missed six games with a left hamstring strain. On 19 February 2016, he scored a season-high 30 points in a 115–111 win over the Atlanta Hawks. The Heat finished the regular season as the third seed in the Eastern Conference with a 48–34 record. In the first round of the 2016 playoffs, the Heat faced the sixth-seeded Charlotte Hornets, and in a game 1 win on 17 April, Deng set a Heat playoff debut record with 31 points on 11-for-13 shooting.

=== Los Angeles Lakers (2016–2018) ===
On 7 July 2016, Deng signed a four-year, $72 million contract with the Los Angeles Lakers. The Lakers signed the two-time All-Star along with Timofey Mozgov to big contracts in a bid to remain competitive after Kobe Bryant's recent retirement. However, in February 2017, Magic Johnson became the Lakers' president of basketball operations, and coach Luke Walton benched Deng to start rookie Brandon Ingram. He missed the final 22 games of the 2016–17 season after being shut down in March to give more playing time to the team's young players.

On opening night of the 2017–18 season, Deng made a substitute start in place of a suspended Kentavious Caldwell-Pope; it was the only game he played the entire season. He and head coach Walton mutually decided that it was better for him to stay in the locker room during games than to play meaningless minutes in garbage time. On 1 September 2018, he was waived and stretched by the Lakers after reaching a buyout agreement. The move freed him to find playing time elsewhere, while the Lakers gained salary cap space to potentially offer a maximum contract to a free agent in 2019. Deng had been the highest-paid Laker in each of his two seasons.

=== Minnesota Timberwolves (2018–2019) ===
On 10 September 2018, Deng signed with the Minnesota Timberwolves, reuniting him with Derrick Rose, Jimmy Butler, Taj Gibson, and head coach Tom Thibodeau. On 11 February 2019, Deng started in place of an ill Andrew Wiggins and scored 12 points in a 130–120 win against the Los Angeles Clippers. It was Deng's first start since 19 October 2017, his lone game for the Lakers during the 2017–18 season.

Deng's final NBA game was played on February 27, 2019, in a 131–123 loss to the Atlanta Hawks. In his final game, Deng recorded one rebound and one steal in eight minutes of playing time.

He would go on to sign a one-day contract with the Bulls to retire with the team.

== National team career ==
Deng represented England at under-16 and under-19 levels, and was an ambassador for the 2012 Summer Olympics. In October 2006, Deng became a naturalised British citizen in a ceremony in Croydon and was called up to play in European competition for the Great Britain national team. He made his debut in a closed international test match against Georgia national team in Pau, France, on 9 August 2007, scoring 19 points. In his first competitive qualifying game representing Great Britain, Deng collected 21 points, 10 rebounds, two assists, three steals and two blocks against Slovakia national team, at Birmingham's National Indoor Arena on 21 August 2007. He played with the team at the 2012 Summer Olympics, where he averaged 15.8 points, 6.6 rebounds, and 4.6 assists. However, Great Britain finished with a 1–4 record.

Deng retains South Sudanese citizenship in addition to his British citizenship, making him a dual citizen.

== Post-playing career ==
Deng has been credited with helping develop South Sudan's basketball presence and their rise on the international stage. In November 2019, he was appointed for four years as president of the South Sudan Basketball Federation (SSBF). On 24 November 2020, it was reported that Deng would coach the South Sudan national team in the FIBA AfroBasket 2021 qualifiers. As of 2023, he served as an assistant coach for the South Sudan national team and as president of the South Sudan Basketball Federation. For his efforts with the SSBF, Deng was likened to Jerry West by Slam.

== Personal life ==
Deng is involved in numerous charities, such as the UK children's charity School Home Support. He has been noted for his work on behalf of the Lost Boys of Sudan and other refugees. During the summers of 2006 and 2007, he went to Africa, Asia and Europe with the NBA for their Basketball Without Borders tour. He is also a spokesperson for the World Food Programme. "He really does epitomize everything I had hoped for as a person and a basketball player", general manager John Paxson said. "I think it's one of the reasons we've gotten to the level we're at this year. I'm truly proud of him. I think the world of him as a person and as a player."

Deng is a fan of Premier League's side Arsenal F.C.

Deng was the cover athlete for NBA Live 09 and NBA Live 10 video games in the United Kingdom.

Deng's cousin, Peter Jok, is a professional basketball player.

Deng has invested in real estate almost since the time he entered the NBA in 2004. In 2020, Deng was included in the annual Powerlist as one of the most influential people in the United Kingdom of African/African–Caribbean descent.

In 2010, he was awarded an honorary doctorate by Loughborough University.

Deng is depicted on one of the Brixton Pound's community currency notes.

Deng was appointed Officer of the Order of the British Empire (OBE) in the 2021 Birthday Honours for services to basketball.

== Career statistics ==
Legend
GP	Games played	GS	Games started	MPG	Minutes per game
FG%	Field goal percentage	3P%	3-point field goal percentage	FT%	Free throw percentage
RPG	Rebounds per game	APG	Assists per game	SPG	Steals per game
BPG	Blocks per game	PPG	Points per game	**Bold**	Career high
*	Led the league

=== NBA ===
==== Regular season ====
Year	Team	GP	GS	MPG	FG%	3P%	FT%	RPG	APG	SPG	BPG	PPG
2004–05	Chicago	61	45	27.3	.434	.265	.741	5.3	2.2	.8	.4	11.7
2005–06	Chicago	78	56	33.4	.463	.269	.750	6.6	1.9	.9	.6	14.3
2006–07	Chicago	**82***	**82***	37.5	**.517**	.143	.777	7.1	2.5	1.2	.6	18.8
2007–08	Chicago	63	59	33.8	.479	.364	.770	6.3	2.5	.9	.5	17.0
2008–09	Chicago	49	46	34.0	.448	**.400**	.796	6.0	1.9	1.2	.5	14.1
2009–10	Chicago	70	69	37.9	.466	.386	.764	**7.3**	2.0	.9	**.9**	17.6
2010–11	Chicago	**82**	**82***	39.1	.460	.345	.750	5.8	2.8	1.0	.6	17.4
2011–12	Chicago	54	54	**39.4***	.412	.367	.770	6.5	2.9	1.0	.7	15.3
2012–13	Chicago	75	75	38.7*	.426	.322	**.816**	6.3	3.0	**1.1**	.4	16.5
2013–14	Chicago	23	23	37.4	.452	.274	.815	6.9	**3.7**	1.0	.2	**19.0**
2013–14	Cleveland	40	40	33.8	.417	.315	.771	5.1	2.5	1.0	.1	14.3
2014–15	Miami	72	72	33.6	.469	.355	.761	5.2	1.9	.9	.3	14.0
2015–16	Miami	74	73	32.4	.455	.344	.755	6.0	1.9	1.0	.4	12.3
2016–17	L.A. Lakers	56	49	26.5	.387	.309	.730	5.3	1.3	.9	.4	7.6
2017–18	L.A. Lakers	1	1	13.0	.500	–	–	.0	1.0	1.0	.0	2.0
2018–19	Minnesota	22	2	17.8	.500	.318	.714	3.3	.8	.7	.4	7.1
Career		902	828	34.3	.456	.332	.769	6.1	2.3	1.0	.5	14.8
All-Star		2	0	11.5	.333	.200	1.000	1.0	1.0	.0	.0	5.0

==== Playoffs ====
Year	Team	GP	GS	MPG	FG%	3P%	FT%	RPG	APG	SPG	BPG	PPG
2006	Chicago	6	0	30.0	.429	.200	.571	4.8	.5	.8	.7	10.2
2007	Chicago	10	10	41.0	**.524**	.000	.807	**8.7**	2.4	1.0	.7	**22.2**
2010	Chicago	5	5	40.6	.463	.083	.731	5.0	1.4	1.2	.8	18.8
2011	Chicago	**16**	**16**	42.9	.426	.324	.839	6.6	2.7	**1.5**	.6	16.9
2012	Chicago	6	6	38.0	.456	.364	.571	8.3	1.5	.8	**1.5**	14.0
2013	Chicago	5	5	**44.8**	.381	.056	.400	7.6	**3.8**	1.0	.6	13.8
2016	Miami	14	14	35.4	.471	**.421**	**.842**	5.9	1.6	.9	.6	13.3
Career		62	56	39.1	.455	.311	.765	7.0	6.7	1.1	.7	15.9

=== College ===
Year	Team	GP	GS	MPG	FG%	3P%	FT%	RPG	APG	SPG	BPG	PPG
2003–04	Duke	37	32	31.1	.476	.360	.710	6.9	1.8	1.3	1.1	15.1

== See also ==
- List of National Basketball Association annual minutes leaders
- List of European basketball players in the United States
- Keiran Zziwa
