= Keiran Zziwa =

Canadian-Ugandan basketball player

Keiran St. Charles Alvarez Zziwa
No. 1 – University of Manitoba
- Position: Point guard / shooting guard
- League: Manitoba Colleges Athletic Conference

Personal information
- Born: 7 November 1997 (age 29) Winnipeg, Manitoba, Canada
- Listed height: 1.82 m (6 ft 0 in)
- Listed weight: 80 kg (176 lb)

Career information
- High school: Glenlawn Collegiate
- College: Manitoba (2015–2021)

Keiran St. Charles Alvarez Zziwa (born 7 November 1997) is a Canadian-Ugandan professional basketball player for the University of Manitoba in the Manitoba Colleges Athletic Conference. He also represents the senior Ugandan national team.

== Early life ==
Zziwa was born in Winnipeg, Manitoba, to Kanyago Charles Zziwa, a native of Uganda, and a Portuguese mother, Tracy Zziwa.

== College career ==
Zziwa featured for the University of Manitoba Bisons from 2015–2021.

== National team ==
He represents the senior Ugandan national team. He made his international debut for Uganda against Morocco in July 2021 during the qualifiers for Afro Basket 2021.

== Significance and Impact ==
Zziwa's selection and appearances for Uganda underscore the growing trend of diaspora players contributing to African national teams, bringing experience from North America college competition to the international stage. His involvement also reflects Uganda's engagement with global basketball through FIBA tournaments.

== See also ==
- Loul Deng
- Ishmail Wainright
- List of National Basketball Association annual minutes leaders
- List of European basketball players in the United States
