= St Mary's Church, Croydon =

Coordinates: 51.3801°N 0.0995°W

St Mary's Church
- Our Lady of Reparation Church
- The church in 2026
- St Mary's Church
- OS grid reference: TQ 32358 66274
- Location: Croydon
- Country: England
- Denomination: Catholic
- Website: Saint-Mary.org.uk

History
- Status: Parish church
- Founder: Fr Alphonsus David
- Dedication: Mary, mother of Jesus

Architecture
- Functional status: Active
- Architect(s): E. W. Pugin; Frederick Walters
- Style: Gothic Revival
- Groundbreaking: 1 May 1863
- Completed: 1864
- Construction cost: £2,742

Administration
- Province: Southwark
- Archdiocese: Southwark
- Deanery: Croydon
- Parish: West Croydon

St Mary's Church or Our Lady of Reparation Church is a Catholic Parish church in Croydon. It was built from 1863 to 1864 and designed by E. W. Pugin and Frederick Walters. It is architecturally in the Gothic Revival style. It is situated to the north of the centre of Croydon on the junction of Wellesley Road and Station Road, next to St Mary's Roman Catholic High School, Croydon, but its parish extends to the west of the town.

== History ==
=== Foundation ===
In 1837, a mission was started in Croydon. It was recorded that a Mass was celebrated in a house in Croydon, 20 Southbridge Road, that became a Mass centre for the mission. In 1841, a chapel was opened in Broad Green, on Handcroft Road. However, anti-Catholic sentiment led to it and the priest, Fr Patrick O’Moore, being attacked. In 1850, a new priest took over the mission, Fr Alphonsus David.

=== Construction ===
The priest, Fr David, worked to get a new church built. In 1861, the current site of the church was bought for £742. The church was also given a £2,000 donation for its construction by a Lady Elizabeth Lloyd Anstruther of Ryde. She was the granddaughter of Peter Burrell, 1st Baron Gwydyr, and niece of John FitzGibbon, 2nd Earl of Clare.Her aunt, Countess Elizabeth Burrell (1793–1879), funded many of the Catholic churches on the Isle of Wight and in the then Diocese of Southwark after meeting and being friends with Thomas Grant, the first bishop of Southwark. She also donated some money and asked for the church to be dedicated to "Our Lady of Reparation". Elizabeth Lloyd Anstruther, after donating the money for the church's construction, would, a few years later, become a Benedictine nun in St Mary's Abbey, Colwich. Construction on the church start on 1 May 1863 and lasted until 1864. The architect was E. W. Pugin, son of Augustus Pugin, and a specialist in Gothic Revival architecture. The capacity of the church at the time of its opening was for 600 people.

=== Developments ===
In 1876, plans were started to expand the church. The plans were made by Frederick Walters. At the time, he lived locally, and carried out the work early in his career, over twenty years before he would go on to design Ealing Abbey and Buckfast Abbey. He extended the chancel by adding side chapels, as well as north and south aisles to the church and the sacristy was enlarged. The plans were put into place in 1881 and on 26 November 1882, the church was reopened. Cardinal Manning, the Archbishop of Westminster preached at the ceremony. According to Historic England, the additions by Walters were designed and constructed "in a seamless manner, such that it is not immediately obvious today where Pugin ends and Walters begins."

In 1968, Wellesley Road, in front of the church, was expanded, so the church lost part of its forecourt. So in 1972, the front entrance to the church was extended, a parish hall added and a new presbytery built. That year, the church interior was changed with the pulpit altar rails removed.

== Parish ==
Next to the church is St Mary's Roman Catholic High School, Croydon, it was built in parallel with the church. It was founded in 1851, in a school building alongside the chapel in Broad Green and moved to its current site when the current church was built, having a small school building alongside it. The church is in the centre of Croydon, but is closer to West Croydon station than East Croydon and its parish is mostly in the west of the town. It has seven Sunday Masses at 7:00 pm on Saturday and at 8:00 am, 9:15 am, 10:45 am, 12:15 pm, 3:00 pm, and 6:00 pm on Sunday.

== See also ==
- Archdiocese of Southwark
