= Lupus Canada =

Canadian nonprofit organization

Lupus Canada is a national voluntary organization dedicated to improving the lives of people living with systemic lupus erythematosus (SLE) through advocacy, education, public awareness, support and research. Formed in 1987, Lupus Canada is a federally registered non-profit charity and its national office is located in Markham, Ontario.

Lupus Canada works in partnership with regional non-profit organizations (also known as member organizations), which provide Canadians individual memberships and local support in their province.

== Charitable works ==
Some of Lupus Canada's significant achievements and contributions include:

- Working with member organizations to provide lupus resources and support services for all Canadians.
- Providing resource information for people living with lupus through print and online newsletters as well as educational materials, which include posters, information packages, fact sheets and brochures.
- Hosting annual Patient Symposia, which bring together people with lupus, their families and supporters, lupus physicians and researchers, and lupus volunteers from across Canada to share the latest developments and information in lupus research and treatments.
- Conducting an annual observance of World Lupus Day (May 10) and promoting October as Lupus Awareness Month to call national attention to the need for greater research, awareness and patient services.
- Continuing to provide financial support to The Canadian Network for Improved Outcomes in Systemic Lupus (CaNIOS), a Canadian national research group on SLE. Since its inception, CaNIOS has had up to a total of 57 clinicians affiliated with 28 Canadian academic-based rheumatic disease units and community rheumatology clinics, and hundreds of patients participating simultaneously in the research effort.
- Continuing its support for the Canadian Institute for Health Research (CIHR) Fellowship program and Dr. Sasha Bernatsky's research around the risk of cancer in lupus.
- Continuing its outreach of lupus resources and maintaining lupus awareness among medical professionals, clinicians, online and print media, Aboriginal reserve communities and women's health networks.

== Member organizations ==
- B.C. Lupus Society
- Lupus Erythematosus Society of Saskatchewan (L.E.S.S.)
- Lupus Society of Manitoba Inc.
- Lupus Ontario
- Lupus Foundation of Ontario
- Lupus Québec
- Lupus New Brunswick
- Lupus Society of Nova Scotia
- Lupus Newfoundland and Labrador
- Lupus PEI
