= St Mary's Catholic High School, Croydon =

St Mary's Catholic High School
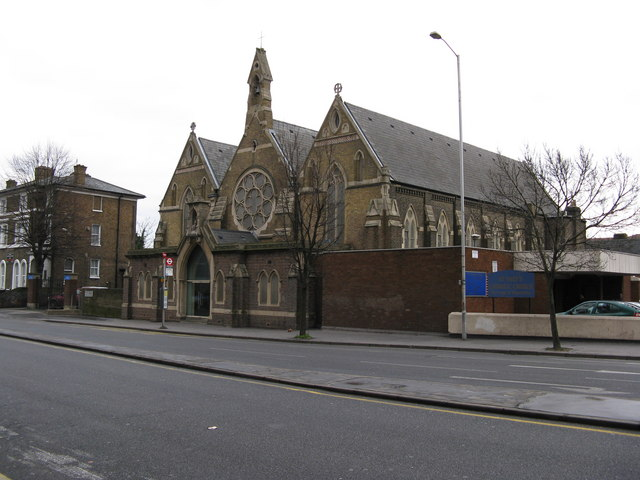

Location
- Woburn Road; Croydon, Greater London, CR9 2EE; England
- Coordinates: 51°22′49″N 0°05′51″W

Information
- Type: Voluntary aided school
- Religious affiliation: Roman Catholic
- Local authority: Croydon
- Department for Education URN: 101814 Tables
- Ofsted: Reports
- Headteacher: Patrick Shields
- Gender: Coeducational
- Age: 11 to 16
- Enrolment: 865
- Website: http://www.st-maryshigh.croydon.sch.uk

St. Mary's Roman Catholic High School is a co-educational, 11-19 secondary school in Croydon, England.

== History ==
The school is one of the longest established schools in Croydon, having been founded on 2 September 1851, situated next to St Mary's Church, Croydon. It has expanded over the years and now caters for about 750 boys and girls, the majority of whom are Catholic but the school is attended by pupils of other faiths.

The head teacher is Patrick Shields.

== Academics ==
It is the 9th most improved school in the country for GCSE exam passes and the percentages are increasing every year. It is placed as the top third school for progress after last years' results which were the best in school's history with 55% of the pupils achieving 5 A*-C in English and Maths compared to only 41% in 2015. 20% of the students achieved A*-A and 40% of students achieving A*-B grades. The school's progress 8 score is 0.45. The school's Attainment 8 score is 47.7. The percentage of students who achieved the EBACC was 20%. The school is the top Catholic state school for pupil's progress in Croydon.

The school has moved from a mid range satisfactory rating to a good rating with the Local Education Authorities. This is based on the Ofsted's last inspection that took place between the 1st and 3 February. The school consistently performs well in science, allowing students to develop and clearly understand basic and advanced theoretical ideas. The school was also recently awarded the "Secondary School of 2016" by Croydon Council - the first time the school has won one.

The school had a sixth form up until 2015 however due to operational reasons the sixth form is temporarily suspended for the years to come.

== Facilities ==
The Computing and Mathematics Specialism's has enabled the school to develop its computer suites and now has one of the highest pupils to computer ratios. The recent implementation of web accessed MLE is further indication of the progressive and modern attitude within the school. The school has succeeded in implementing a refurbishment program for the design and technology block to allow a new computer suite for Art, a revised and improved working area for Design and Technology and completely modernised classrooms for RE.

== Alumni ==
- Abiola Aderibigbe - British-Nigerian lawyer
- Luol Deng OBE (b. 1985) - Professional basketball player
