= List of NBA annual minutes played leaders =

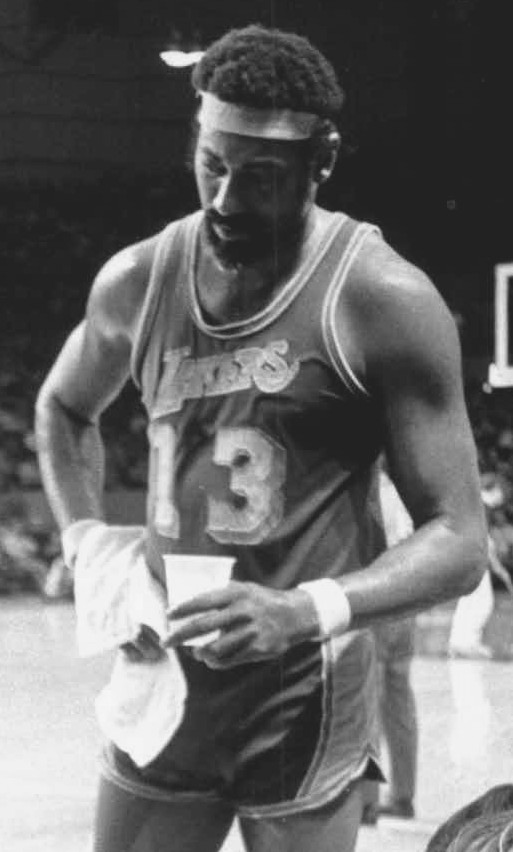
Wilt Chamberlain holds the seven highest season-leading minutes played averages and led the league nine times.

In basketball, minutes of game time during which a player is on the court are recorded. The minutes played statistics are recorded as far back as the 1951–52 NBA season when statistics on minutes were first compiled by the National Basketball Association (NBA). Fifteen times the average leader has played fewer than 40 minutes per game and eight times the leader has played more than 46 minutes per game. Wilt Chamberlain has the seven highest leading totals, while Nate Archibald is the only other single-season leader to average over 46 minutes per game. In one season, Wilt Chamberlain averaged over 48 minutes per game (meaning that he rested fewer minutes during the season than he played in overtime during the season).

To qualify as minutes leader, the player must appear in at least 58 games (out of 82). However, a player who appears in fewer than 58 games may qualify as annual minutes leader if his minute total would have given him the greatest average, had he appeared in 58 games. This has been the requirement since the 2013–14 NBA season.

Wilt Chamberlain led the league in minutes played per game nine times, followed by Allen Iverson (7), Michael Finley and LeBron James (3) times. Twelve other players have led the league in minutes per game twice, eight of them in consecutive years. Wilt Chamberlain holds the record for consecutive titles with five, followed by Iverson with three (two times). Fifteen times a member of the San Francisco Warriors, Philadelphia Warriors, Golden State Warriors has led the league in average minutes. Nine full seasons and parts of another the average leader played for the Philadelphia 76ers. Seventeen seasons and parts of another the leader played for either the Philadelphia Warriors or the Philadelphia 76ers.

In 16 of the 61 seasons since the statistics has been kept, the minutes per game leader was not the total minutes played leader. Larry Bird and Allen Iverson are the only multiple leaders in average who were surpassed in total minutes multiple times. Five of Allen Iverson's seven times and both of Larry Bird's times as the average leader they were surpassed in total minutes. Kevin Durant is the only player to lead the league in total minutes without finishing in the top three in average minutes during the same season. He is also the only player to never lead in average minutes, but lead in total minutes multiple times. The first four times and five of the first seven times that the leader in average did not lead in total minutes, he finished second in total minutes. However, the last six times that the average leader did not lead the league in total minutes, he was outside the top 10 and the last nine times, he was outside the top 5.

== Key ==
^		Denotes player who is still active in the NBA			
*		Inducted into the Naismith Memorial Basketball Hall of Fame			
†		Not yet eligible for Hall of Fame consideration (Note: A player is not eligible for induction into the Naismith Memorial Basketball Hall of Fame until he has been fully retired for two calendar years.)			
§		1st time eligible for Hall of Fame in 2025			
Player (X)		Denotes the number of times the player had been the minutes leader up to and including that season			
G	Guard	F	Forward	C	Center

== Annual leaders ==
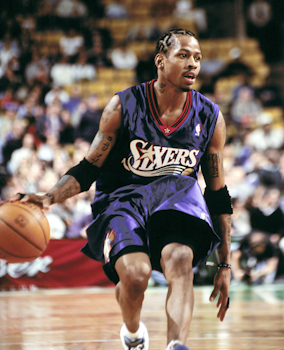
Allen Iverson led the league in average minutes seven times.

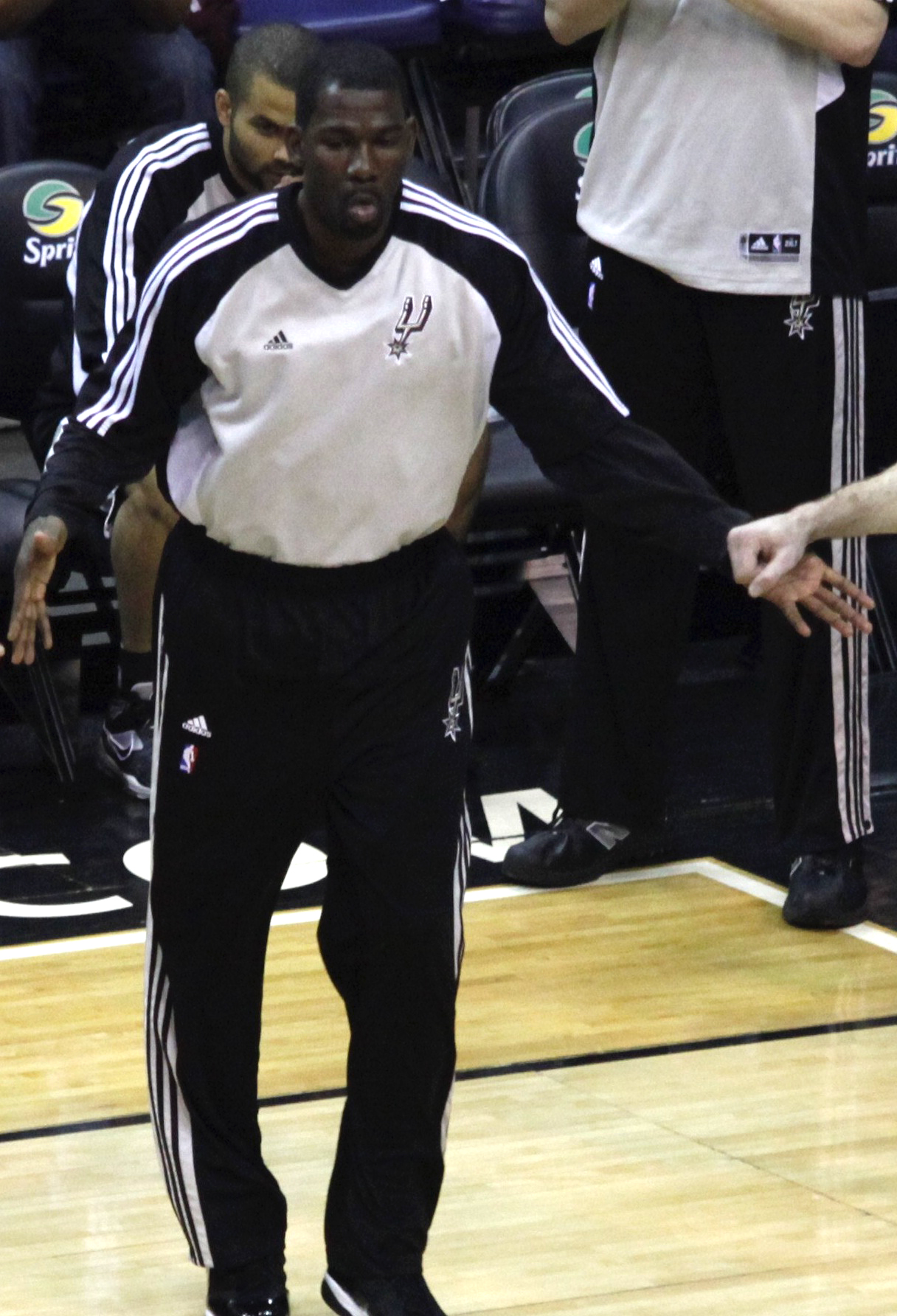
Michael Finley led the league in average minutes three times.

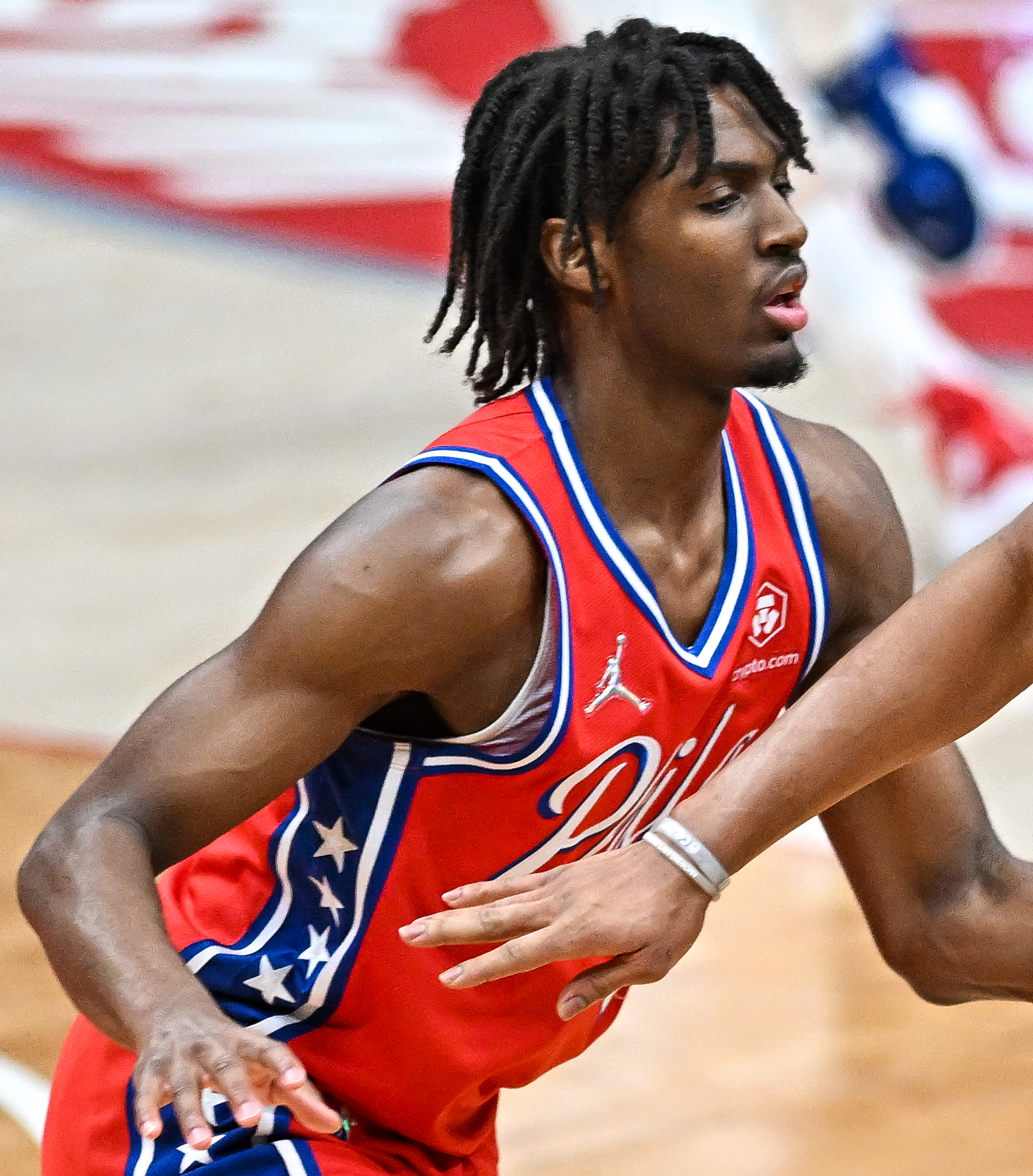
Tyrese Maxey is the reigning minutes played leader in the NBA.

Season	Player	Position (Note: The player's primary position is listed first.)	Team	Games played	Total minutes	Minutes per game	References
1951–52	Paul Arizin*	F/G	Philadelphia Warriors	66	2939	44.53	
1952–53	Neil Johnston*	C	Philadelphia Warriors	70	3166	45.23	
1953–54	Neil Johnston* (2)	C	Philadelphia Warriors	72	3296	45.78	
1954–55	Paul Arizin* (2)	F/G	Philadelphia Warriors	72	2953	41.01	
1955–56	Jack George	G	Philadelphia Warriors	72	2840	39.44	
1956–57	Dolph Schayes*	F/C	Syracuse Nationals	72	2851	39.60	
1957–58	Dolph Schayes* (2)	F/C	Syracuse Nationals	72	2918	40.53	
1958–59	Bill Russell*	C	Boston Celtics	70	2979	42.56	
1959–60	Wilt Chamberlain* (Note: In the 1959–60 NBA season, Gene Shue tied Wilt Chamberlain for the highest minutes total (3338) but was second in minutes average (44.51).)	C	Philadelphia Warriors	72	3338	46.36	
1960–61	Wilt Chamberlain* (2)	C	Philadelphia Warriors	79	3773	47.76	
1961–62	Wilt Chamberlain* (3)	C	Philadelphia Warriors	80	3882	48.52	
1962–63	Wilt Chamberlain* (4)	C	San Francisco Warriors	80	3806	47.58	
1963–64	Wilt Chamberlain* (5)	C	San Francisco Warriors	80	3689	46.11	
1964–65	Oscar Robertson* (Note: In the 1964–65 NBA season, Bill Russell had the highest minute total (3466) but was third in minutes average (44.44) behind Oscar Robertson and Wilt Chamberlain (45.22). Oscar Robertson was second in total minutes (3421).)	G	Cincinnati Royals	75	3421	45.61	
1965–66	Wilt Chamberlain* (6)	C	Philadelphia 76ers	79	3737	47.30	
1966–67	Wilt Chamberlain* (7)	C	Philadelphia 76ers	81	3682	45.46	
1967–68	Wilt Chamberlain* (8)	C	Philadelphia 76ers	82	3836	46.78	
1968–69	Wilt Chamberlain* (9) (Note: In the 1968–69 NBA season, Elvin Hayes had the highest minutes total (3695) but was third in minutes average (45.06) behind Wilt Chamberlain and Nate Thurmond (45.18). Wilt Chamberlain was second in total minutes (3669).)	C	Los Angeles Lakers	81	3669	45.30	
1969–70	Elvin Hayes*	F/C	San Diego Rockets	82	3665	44.70	
1970–71	John Havlicek*	F/G	Boston Celtics	81	3678	45.41	
1971–72	John Havlicek* (2)	F/G	Boston Celtics	82	3698	45.10	
1972–73	Nate "Tiny" Archibald*	G	Kansas City–Omaha Kings	80	3681	46.01	
1973–74	Elvin Hayes* (2)	F/C	Capital Bullets	82	3665	44.47	
1974–75	Bob McAdoo*	C/F	Buffalo Braves	82	3539	43.16	
1975–76	Bob McAdoo* (2) (Note: In the 1975–76 NBA season, Kareem Abdul-Jabbar had the highest minutes total (3379) but was second in minutes average (41.21). Bob McAdoo was second in total minutes (3328).)	C/F	Buffalo Braves	78	3328	42.67	
1976–77	Pete Maravich* (Note: In the 1976–77 NBA season, Elvin Hayes had the highest minutes total (3364) but was second in minutes average (41.02). Pete Maravich was seventh in total minutes (3041) behind Elvin Hayes, Jo Jo White (3333), Rudy Tomjanovich (3130), Billy Knight (3117), Norm Van Lier (3097) and Randy Smith (3094).)	G	New Orleans Jazz	73	3041	41.66	
1977–78	Truck Robinson	F/C	New Orleans Jazz	82	3638	44.37	
1978–79	Moses Malone*	C/F	Houston Rockets	82	3390	41.34	
1979–80	Norm Nixon	G	Los Angeles Lakers	82	3226	39.34	
1980–81	Adrian Dantley*	F/C	Utah Jazz	80	3417	42.71	
1981–82	Moses Malone* (2)	C/F	Houston Rockets	81	3398	41.95	
1982–83	Kelly Tripucka (Note: In the 1982–83 NBA season, Isiah Thomas had the highest minutes total (3093) but was second in minutes average (38.19). Kelly Tripucka was not among the top 10 in total minutes.)	F/G	Detroit Pistons	58	2252	38.83	
1983–84	Jeff Ruland	C/F	Washington Bullets	75	3082	41.09	
1984–85	Larry Bird* (Note: In the 1984–85 NBA season, Buck Williams had the highest minute total (3182) but was third in minutes average (38.80) behind Larry Bird and Purvis Short (39.50). Larry Bird was second in total minutes (3161).)	F	Boston Celtics	80	3161	39.51	
1985–86	Maurice Cheeks*	G	Philadelphia 76ers	82	3270	39.88	
1986–87	Larry Bird* (2) (Note: In the 1986–87 NBA season, Michael Jordan had the highest minute total (3281) but was third in minutes average (40.01) behind Larry Bird and Charles Barkley (40.29). Larry Bird was not among the top 10 in total minutes.)	F	Boston Celtics	74	3005	40.61	
1987–88	Michael Jordan*	G	Chicago Bulls	82	3311	40.38	
1988–89	Michael Jordan* (2)	G	Chicago Bulls	81	3255	40.19	
1989–90	Rodney McCray	F/G	Sacramento Kings	82	3238	39.49	
1990–91	Chris Mullin*	F/G	Golden State Warriors	82	3315	40.43	
1991–92	Chris Mullin* (2)	F/G	Golden State Warriors	81	3346	41.31	
1992–93	Larry Johnson	F	Charlotte Hornets	82	3323	40.52	
1993–94	Latrell Sprewell	G	Golden State Warriors	82	3533	43.09	
1994–95	Vin Baker	F	Milwaukee Bucks	82	3361	40.99	
1995–96	Anthony Mason	F	New York Knicks	82	3457	42.16	
1996–97	Anthony Mason (2) (Note: In the 1996–97 NBA season, Glen Rice had the highest minutes total (3362) but was second in minutes average (42.56). Anthony Mason was not among the top 10 in total minutes.)	F	Charlotte Hornets	73	3143	43.05	
1997–98	Michael Finley	G/F	Dallas Mavericks	82	3394	41.39	
1998–99 (Note: The 1998–99 NBA season was shortened to 50 games due to the league's lockout. The qualification for this season's minutes leader was to appear in at least 43 games (out of 50) or to have at played least 1220 minutes.)	Allen Iverson* (Note: In the 1998–99 NBA season, Jason Kidd had the highest minutes total (2060) but was second in minutes average (41.20). Allen Iverson (1990) was sixth in total minutes behind Jason Kidd, Michael Finley (2051), Shareef Abdur-Rahim (2021), Scottie Pippen (2011) and Gary Payton (2008).)	G	Philadelphia 76ers	48	1990	41.46	
1999–00	Michael Finley (2)	G/F	Dallas Mavericks	82	3464	42.24	
2000–01	Michael Finley (3)	G/F	Dallas Mavericks	82	3443	41.99	
2001–02	Allen Iverson* (2) (Note: In the 2001–02 NBA season, Antoine Walker had the highest minutes total (3406) but was third in minutes average (42.05) behind Allen Iverson and Cuttino Mobley (42.11). Allen Iverson was not among the top 10 in total minutes.)	G	Philadelphia 76ers	60	2622	43.70	
2002–03	Allen Iverson* (3)	G	Philadelphia 76ers	82	3485	42.50	
2003–04	Allen Iverson* (4) (Note: In the 2003–04 NBA season, Joe Johnson had the highest minutes total (3331) but was third in minutes average (40.62) behind Allen Iverson and Shawn Marion (40.72). Allen Iverson was not among the top 10 in total minutes.)	G	Philadelphia 76ers	48	2040	42.50	
2004–05	LeBron James^	F	Cleveland Cavaliers	80	3388	42.35	
2005–06	Allen Iverson* (5) (Note: In the 2005–06 NBA season, Gilbert Arenas had the highest minute total (3384) but was third in minutes average (42.30) behind Allen Iverson and LeBron James (42.54). Allen Iverson was not among the top 10 in total minutes.)	G	Philadelphia 76ers	72	3103	43.10	
2006–07	Allen Iverson* (6) (Note: In the 2006–07 NBA season, LeBron James had the highest minute total (3190) but was third in minutes average (40.90) behind Allen Iverson and Joe Johnson (41.39). Allen Iverson was not among the top 10 in total minutes.)	G	Philadelphia 76ers/Denver Nuggets	65	2761	42.48	
2007–08	Allen Iverson* (7)	G	Denver Nuggets	82	3424	41.76	
2008–09	Andre Iguodala	F/G	Philadelphia 76ers	82	3269	39.87	
2009–10	Monta Ellis (Note: In the 2009–10 NBA season, Kevin Durant had the highest minutes total (3239) but was fourth in minutes average (39.50) behind Monta Ellis, Gerald Wallace (41.04) and Rudy Gay (39.69). Monta Ellis was not among the top 10 in total minutes.)	G	Golden State Warriors	64	2647	41.36	
2010–11	Monta Ellis (2)	G	Golden State Warriors	80	3227	40.34	
2011–12 (Note: The 2011–12 NBA season was shortened to 66 games due to the league's lockout. The qualification for this season's minutes leader was to appear in at least 56 games (out of 66) or to have at played least 1610 minutes.)	Luol Deng (Note: In the 2011–12 NBA season, Kevin Durant had the highest minutes total (2546) but was third in minutes average (38.58) behind Luol Deng and Kevin Love (39.00). Luol Deng was not among the top 10 in total minutes.)	F	Chicago Bulls	54	2129	39.43	
2012–13	Luol Deng (2) (Note: In the 2012–13 NBA season, Damian Lillard had the highest minutes total (3166) but was third in minutes average (38.61) behind Luol Deng and Kobe Bryant (38.63). Luol Deng was not among the top 10 in total minutes.)	F	Chicago Bulls	75	2903	38.71	
2013–14	Carmelo Anthony* (Note: In the 2013–14 NBA season, Kevin Durant had the highest minutes total (3122) but was third in minutes average (38.54) behind Carmelo Anthony and Jimmy Butler (38.67). Carmelo Anthony was fourth in total minutes (2982) behind Kevin Durant, Monta Ellis (3023) and DeMar DeRozan (3017).)	F	New York Knicks	77	2982	38.73	
2014–15	Jimmy Butler^ (Note: In the 2014–15 NBA season, James Harden had the highest minutes total (2981) but was second in minute average (36.80). Jimmy Butler was not among the top 10 in total minutes.)	G/F	Chicago Bulls	65	2513	38.66	
2015–16	James Harden^	G	Houston Rockets	82	3125	38.11	
2016–17	LeBron James^ (2) (Note: In the 2016–17 NBA season, Andrew Wiggins had the highest minutes total (3048) but was third in minutes average (37.17) behind LeBron James and Kyle Lowry (37.40). LeBron James was tenth in total minutes (2794) behind Andrew Wiggins, Karl-Anthony Towns (3030), James Harden (2947), Giannis Antetokounmpo (2845), John Wall (2836), Jimmy Butler (2809), Harrison Barnes (2803), Russell Westbrook (2802) and CJ McCollum (2796).)	F	Cleveland Cavaliers	74	2794	37.76	
2017–18	LeBron James^ (3)	F	Cleveland Cavaliers	82	3026	36.90	
2018–19	Bradley Beal^	G	Washington Wizards	82	3028	36.93	
2019–20	Damian Lillard^	G	Portland Trail Blazers	66	2474	37.48	
2020–21	Julius Randle^	F	New York Knicks	71	2667	37.56	
2021–22	Pascal Siakam^	F/C	Toronto Raptors	68	2578	37.91	
2022–23	Pascal Siakam^ (2)	F/C	Toronto Raptors	71	2652	37.40	
2023–24	DeMar DeRozan^	F	Chicago Bulls	79	2989	37.84	
2024–25	Josh Hart^	F	New York Knicks	77	2897	37.62	
2025–26	Tyrese Maxey^	G	Philadelphia 76ers	70	2661	38.01	

== Multiple-time leaders ==
Rank	Player	Team	Times as leader	Years
1	Wilt Chamberlain	Philadelphia Warriors/San Francisco Warriors (5), Philadelphia 76ers (3), Los Angeles Lakers (1)	9	1960, 1961, 1962, 1963, 1964, 1966, 1967, 1968, 1969
2	Allen Iverson	Philadelphia 76ers (5) / Philadelphia 76ers/Denver Nuggets (1) / Denver Nuggets (1)	7	1999, 2002, 2003, 2004, 2006, 2007, 2008
3	Michael Finley	Dallas Mavericks	3	1998, 2000, 2001
3	LeBron James	Cleveland Cavaliers	3	2005, 2017, 2018
5	Paul Arizin	Philadelphia Warriors	2	1952, 1955
5	Larry Bird	Boston Celtics	2	1985, 1987
5	Luol Deng	Chicago Bulls	2	2012, 2013
5	Monta Ellis	Golden State Warriors	2	2010, 2011
5	John Havlicek	Boston Celtics	2	1971, 1972
5	Elvin Hayes	San Diego Rockets (1) / Capital Bullets (1)	2	1970, 1974
5	Neil Johnston	Philadelphia Warriors	2	1953, 1954
5	Michael Jordan	Chicago Bulls	2	1988, 1989
5	Moses Malone	Houston Rockets	2	1979, 1982
5	Anthony Mason	New York Knicks (1) / Charlotte Hornets (1)	2	1996, 1997
5	Bob McAdoo	Buffalo Braves	2	1975, 1976
5	Chris Mullin	Golden State Warriors	2	1991, 1992
5	Dolph Schayes	Syracuse Nationals	2	1957, 1958
5	Pascal Siakam	Toronto Raptors	2	2022, 2023

== See also ==
- NBA records
- List of NBA career minutes played leaders
- List of NBA annual assists leaders
- List of NBA annual scoring leaders
- List of NBA annual 3-point scoring leaders
- List of NBA annual rebounding leaders
- List of NBA annual steals leaders
- List of NBA annual blocks leaders
- List of NBA annual field goal percentage leaders
