= Blake Aoki =

American-Japanese basketball player

Blake Aoki 青木 ブレイク
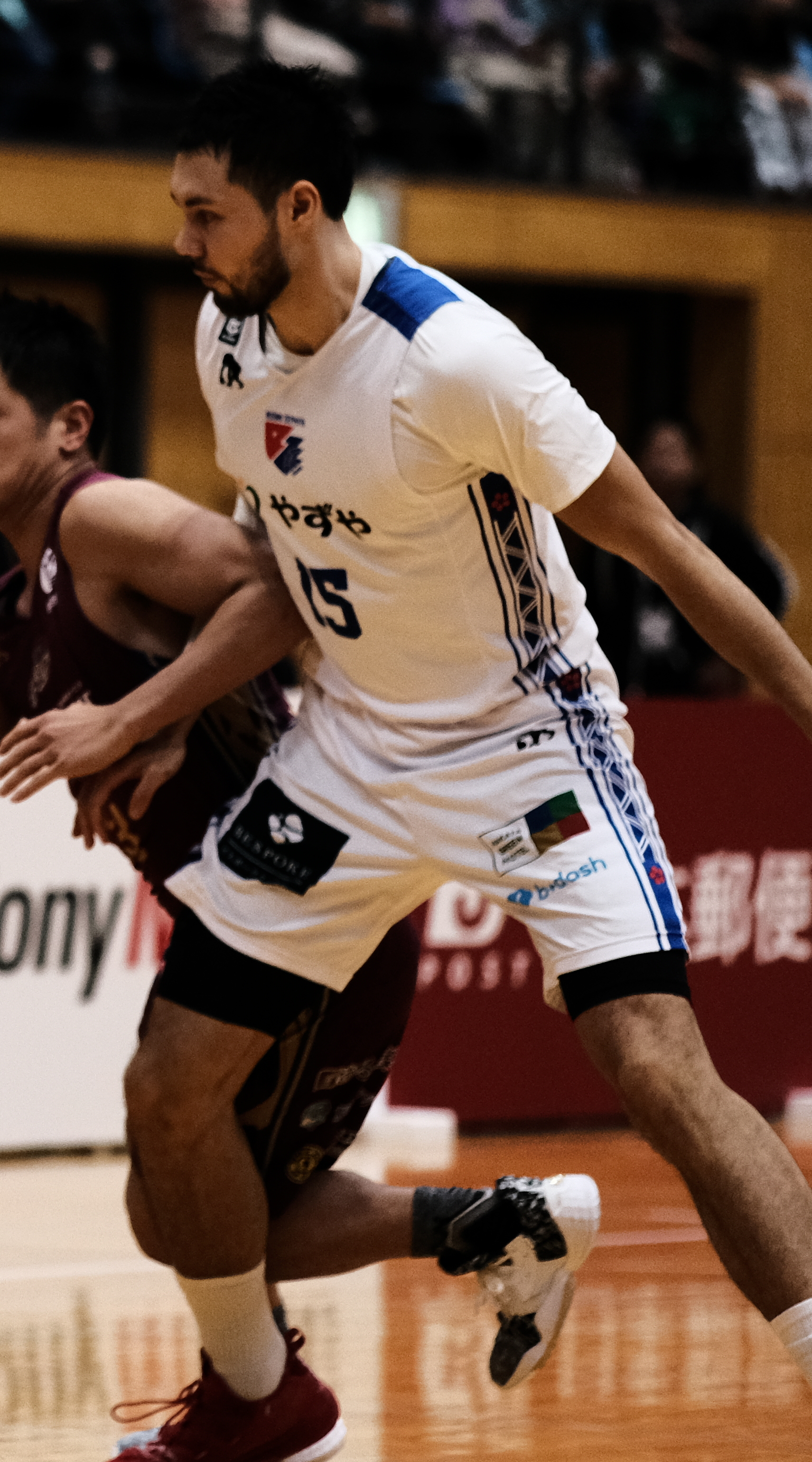

No. 11 – Utsunomiya Brex
- Position: Power forward / center
- League: B.League

Personal information
- Born: November 13, 1993 (age 33) Brooklyn, New York, U.S.
- Listed height: 6 ft 9 in (2.06 m)
- Listed weight: 220 lb (100 kg)

Career information
- High school: Telecommunication Arts & Technology (Brooklyn, New York)
- College: SUNY Purchase (2011–2013); Brooklyn (2013); CCNY (2014–2016)
- Playing career: 2017–present

Career history
- 2017: Link Tochigi Brex
- 2017-2018: Toyama Grouses
- 2018-2020: Rizing Zephyr Fukuoka
- 2020-2021: Tokyo Hachioji Bee Trains
- 2021-2022: Kanazawa Samuraiz
- 2022-2023: Shonan United
- 2023-2024: Toyoda Gosei Scorpions
- 2024-2025: Tokushima Gambarous
- 2025-present: Utsunomiya Brex

Blake Aoki Borysewicz (青木 ブレイク, Blake Aoki; born November 13, 1993) is an American and Japanese professional basketball player for the Toyoda Gosei Scorpions (B.League). Blake has won one college championship for State University of New York at Purchase (2012–2013) and a championship for the Link Tochigi Brex (2016-2017) crowning him and his team the first B. League Champions in Japan.

== Early life ==
Blake Aoki Borysewicz was born and raised in Brooklyn, New York. His father, Alfonse Borysewicz, is a Brooklyn-based painter of note. His father is American and his mother is Japanese.

== Career ==
Borysewicz played both high school basketball and volleyball at The High School of Telecommunication Arts and Technology, where he played two full season for the Yellowjackets Varsity Team in the Brooklyn A SouthWest Division for each sport. During his two seasons of basketball for the Yellowjackets, he played power forward and center both seasons, and led the Yellowjackets to a playoff berth his senior year as starting Center and captain of his team under head coach Chris Weil. In his senior year of his volleyball season, he led the Yellowjackets to a playoff berth. He was also selected to the men's volleyball all star game as a starter. He led all New York City public schools in Blocks and was #3 in the city in Kills under head coach Seung Yu. Graduated 2011.

Blake Aoki Borysewicz attended three colleges during a five-year span (SUNY Purchase, Brooklyn College and The City College of New York) graduating with a bachelor's degree in Sociology for the Colin Powell School in the City College of New York.

After graduating high school Blake Aoki Borysewicz was recruited to play for the Panthers of the State University of New York: Purchase College. He spent two full seasons there playing for both the Basketball and volleyball team. During the two years Blake Borysewicz spent on the men's basketball team at Suny Purchase, they had back to back conference championship appearances vs. Farmingdale State College. The first appearance resulted into a championship loss, as they reappeared in the championship the following season butchering Farmingdale state college in a home win 71–48. After qualifying for the NCAA tournament, the season came to an end in a first round away loss vs. Worcester Polytechnic Institute.

Borysewicz then transferred back home to Brooklyn College for five semesters, but did not play for the Brooklyn Bull dogs.

During his mid-junior year, Blake Aoki Borysewicz transferred to the City College of New York to play for the Beavers for his final season and a half. During these three semesters on the men's basketball team the Borysewicz filled the void at the Center position, starting both seasons leading the Beavers to a playoff berth his senior year after developing one of the strongest defenses in the country.

Blake Aoki was signed professionally to the Link Tochigi Brex in February 2017 for the remainder of the 2016–2017 season. During the season Blake Aoki was also invited to join the Japanese Under 24 national team camp located in Tokyo. The Link Tochigi Brex finished the season a top of the B League. After beating Chiba Jets 2–0, Aisin Seahorses 2–1, they would advance to the championship game vs the other #1 seeded Kawasaki Brave Thunder on May 27. They would go on and become the first B. League champions cruising to a 79–85 win. The city of Tochigi held its championship parade for the Link Tochigi Brex the following week on June 3.

After the 2017 season and championship, the Link Tochigi Brex resigned Blake Aoki to a 2-year deal. But both sides reached an agreement sending Aoki to the Toyama Grouses for the 2017–2018 season.
