= Joshua Palacios =

American baseball player (born 1995)

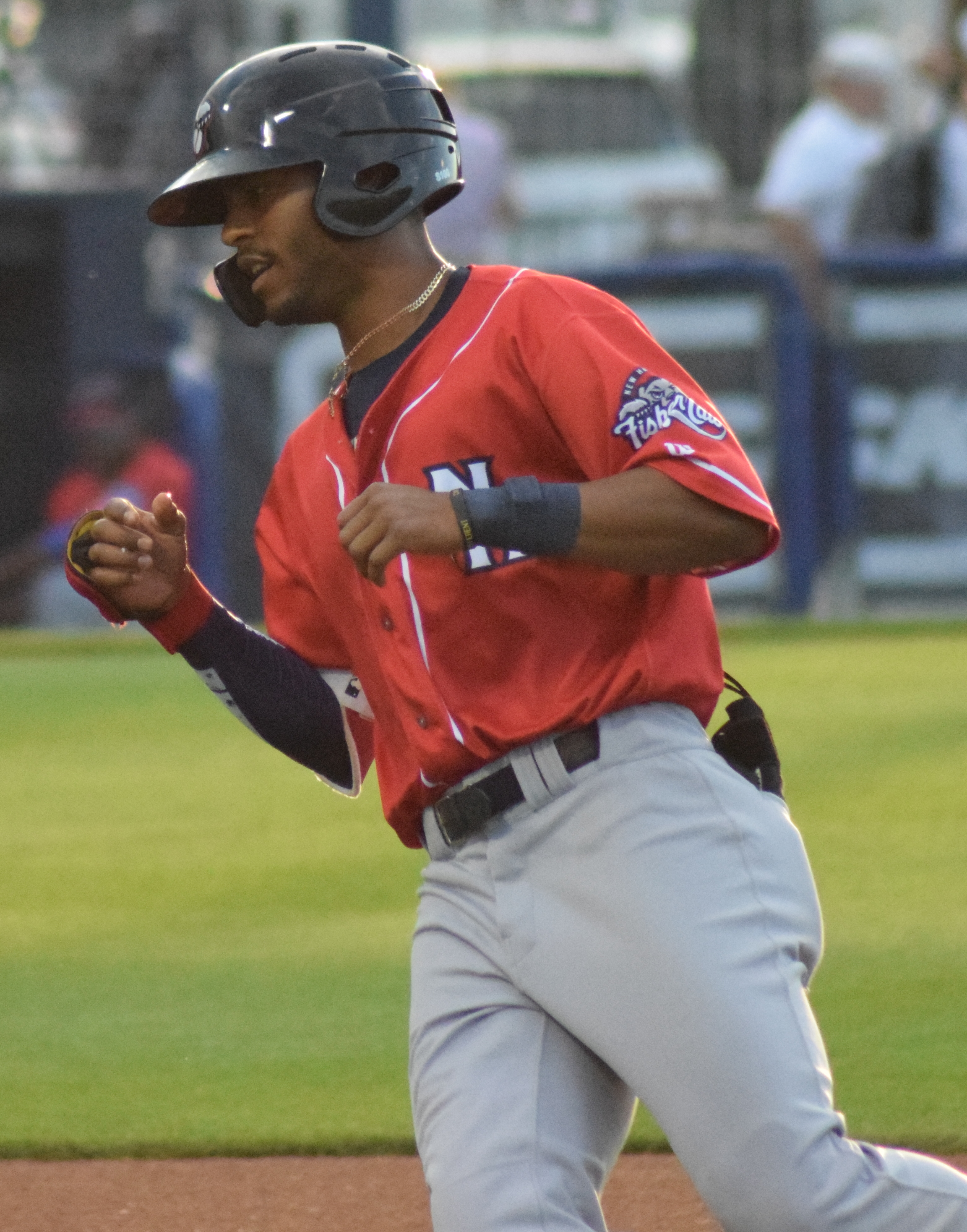
- Palacios with the New Hampshire Fisher Cats in 2019

Free agent
- Outfielder
- Born: July 30, 1995 (age 31); Brooklyn, New York, U.S.
- Bats: Left Throws: Right

MLB debut
- April 9, 2021, for the Toronto Blue Jays

MLB statistics (through 2025 season)
- Batting average: .223
- Home runs: 15
- Runs batted in: 64
- Stats at Baseball Reference

Teams
- Toronto Blue Jays (2021); Washington Nationals (2022); Pittsburgh Pirates (2023–2024); Chicago White Sox (2025)

Joshua John Palacios (born July 30, 1995) is an American professional baseball outfielder who is a free agent. He has previously played in Major League Baseball (MLB) for the Toronto Blue Jays, Washington Nationals, Pittsburgh Pirates and Chicago White Sox.

== Amateur career ==
Palacios attended the High School of Telecommunication Arts and Technology in his hometown of Brooklyn, New York, and was selected as the 2013 New York City High School Player of the Year. He was selected by the Cincinnati Reds in the 31st round of the 2014 Major League Baseball draft, but did not sign and instead attended San Jacinto Junior College. In his first season of college baseball, Palacios batted .376 with six doubles and 26 runs batted in (RBIs). In the offseason, Palacios signed a letter of intent to transfer to Auburn University for the 2016 season. As a sophomore with San Jacinto, he hit .364 with 12 doubles, nine triples, 36 RBIs, and 29 stolen bases. At the end of the season, Palacios was named the 37th best junior college prospect in the country. In his lone season with Auburn, Palacios batted .385 with five home runs, 23 RBIs, and 12 stolen bases.

== Professional career ==
=== Toronto Blue Jays ===
The Toronto Blue Jays selected Palacios in the fourth round of the 2016 Major League Baseball draft, and he signed for a $438,100 signing bonus. He was assigned to the Rookie-level Gulf Coast League Blue Jays and appeared in 13 games before being promoted to the Short Season-A Vancouver Canadians. After 28 games in Vancouver, Palacios was promoted to the Class-A Lansing Lugnuts, where he finished his 2016 campaign. In 50 total games across three levels, Palacios batted .330 with 18 RBIs. He was assigned to Lansing for the entire 2017 season, and hit .280 with two home runs, 39 RBIs, and 12 stolen bases in 91 games.

On November 20, 2020, the Blue Jays added Palacios to their 40-man roster. On April 9, 2021, Palacios was promoted to the major leagues for the first time. He made his MLB debut that night as the starting right fielder against the Los Angeles Angels. Palacios was assigned to Triple-A Buffalo on May 3, 2021. He was designated for assignment on April 11, 2022.

=== Washington Nationals ===
On April 15, 2022, the Washington Nationals claimed Palacios from the Blue Jays off of waivers. On December 1, 2022, Palacios was sent outright off of the 40-man roster.

=== Pittsburgh Pirates ===
On December 7, 2022, at the Winter Meetings, the Pittsburgh Pirates selected Palacios from the Nationals in the minor league phase of the Rule 5 draft. He began the 2023 season with the Double-A Altoona Curve, but was quickly promoted to the Triple-A Indianapolis Indians. In 21 combined games, he hit .368/.433/.598 with 4 home runs, 22 RBI, and 4 stolen bases.

On May 9, 2023, the Pirates selected Palacios' contract. On June 2, Palacios hit his first Major League home run at PNC Park against the St. Louis Cardinals. On July 30, he hit a walk-off two-run homer off of Andrew Vasquez of the Philadelphia Phillies. In doing so, he became the first player in Pirates history to hit a walk-off home run on his birthday. In 91 games for the Pirates, Palacios batted .239/.279/.413 with 10 home runs and 40 RBI.

Palacios was optioned to Triple-A Indianapolis to begin the 2024 season. In 23 appearances for Pittsburgh, he batted .224/.333/.343 with two home runs, nine RBI, and one stolen base.

Palacios was designated for assignment by the Pirates on March 23, 2025. He cleared waivers and was sent outright to Triple-A Indianapolis on March 29. However, Palacios rejected the assignment and elected free agency two days later.

=== Chicago White Sox ===
On April 3, 2025, Palacios signed a minor league contract with the Chicago White Sox. In five games for the Triple-A Charlotte Knights, he went 3-for-13 (.231) with one RBI. On April 10, the White Sox selected Palacios' contract, adding him to their active roster. In 51 appearances for Chicago, he batted .203/.292/.305 with three home runs and nine RBI. On June 13, Palacios was designated for assignment by the White Sox. He cleared waivers and was sent outright to Triple-A Charlotte on June 15. Palacios elected free agency on October 3.

=== Staten Island FerryHawks ===
On April 18, 2026, Palacios signed with the Staten Island FerryHawks of the Atlantic League of Professional Baseball. In 35 appearances for the FerryHawks, Palacios batted .339/.434/.621 with 8 home runs, 22 RBI, and four stolen bases.

=== Pittsburgh Pirates (second stint) ===
On July 7, 2026, Palacios signed with the Pittsburgh Pirates on a minor league contract. In 38 games with Triple-A Indianapolis Indians he batted .234/.307/.290 with no home runs, 16 RBIs and 5 stolen bases. He elected free agency on November 2.

== International career ==
Palacios played for the Netherlands national baseball team at the 2023 World Baseball Classic, along with his brother Richie. In nine at-bats over four games, Palacios hit .111/.200/.111 with one RBI and three strikeouts.

== Personal life ==
Palacios' brother, Richie, was drafted by the Cleveland Indians in the third round of the 2018 Major League Baseball draft. Their uncle, Rey, played in Major League Baseball for the Kansas City Royals from 1988 to 1990. Palacios' father is Puerto Rican, and mother is from Curaçao.

== See also ==
- Rule 5 draft results
