= Joakim Noah =

Former basketball player (born 1985)

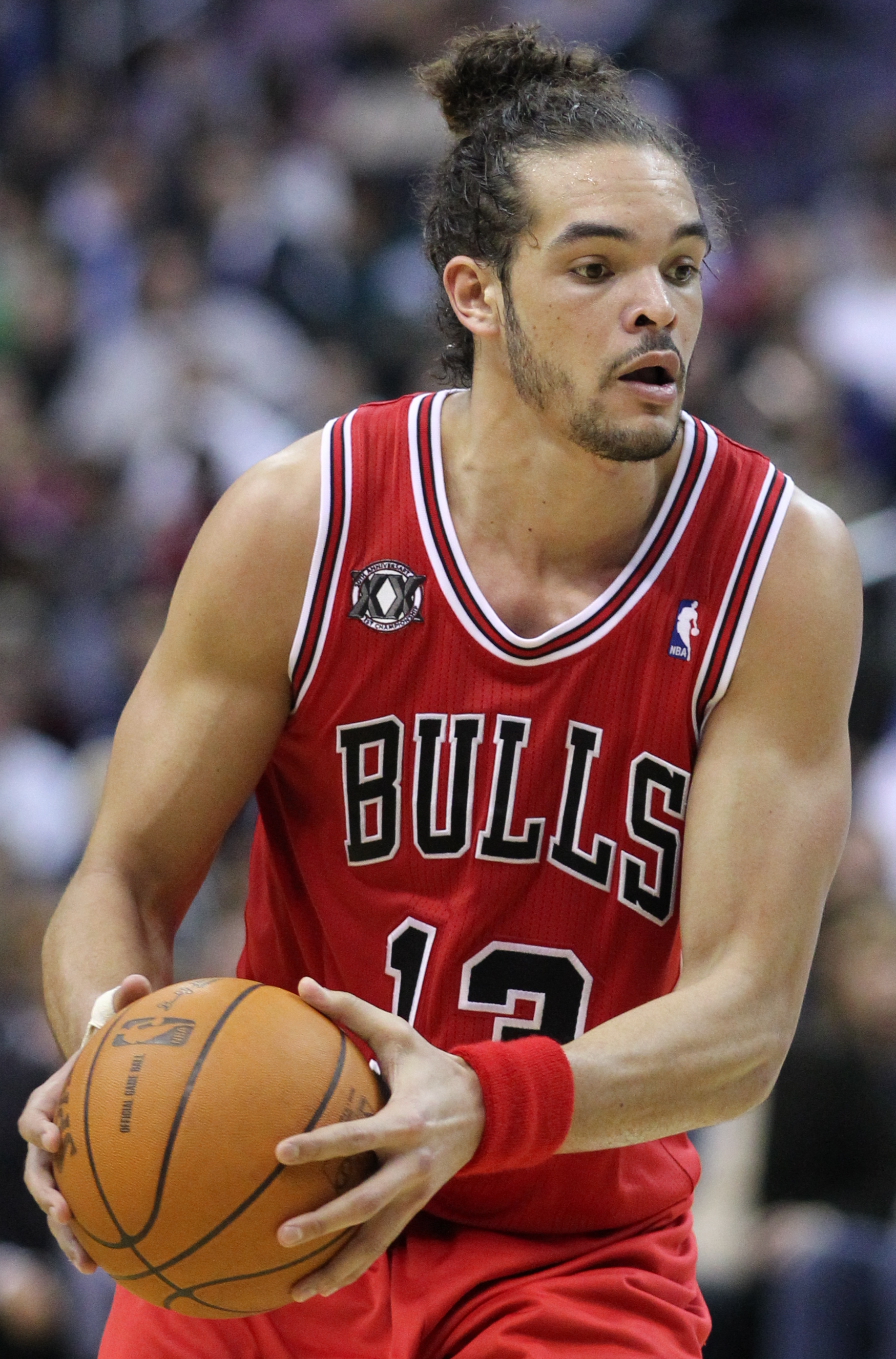
- Noah with the Chicago Bulls in 2011

Personal information
- Born: February 25, 1985 (age 41) Manhattan, New York, U.S.
- Listed height: 6 ft 11 in (2.11 m)
- Listed weight: 232 lb (105 kg)

Career information
- High school: United Nations International (New York City, New York); Poly Prep (Brooklyn, New York); The Lawrenceville School (Lawrenceville, New Jersey)
- College: Florida (2004–2007)
- NBA draft: 2007: 1st round, 9th overall pick
- Drafted by: Chicago Bulls
- Playing career: 2007–2020
- Position: Center
- Number: 13, 55

Career history
- 2007–2016: Chicago Bulls
- 2016–2018: New York Knicks
- 2017: →Westchester Knicks
- 2018–2019: Memphis Grizzlies
- 2020: Los Angeles Clippers

Career highlights
- 2× NBA All-Star (2013, 2014); All-NBA First Team (2014); NBA Defensive Player of the Year (2014); 2× NBA All-Defensive First Team (2013, 2014); NBA All-Defensive Second Team (2011); 2× NCAA champion (2006, 2007); NCAA Final Four Most Outstanding Player (2006); Consensus second-team All-American (2007); 2× First-team All-SEC (2006, 2007)

Career statistics
- Points: 5,881 (8.8 ppg)
- Rebounds: 6,058 (9.0 rpg)
- Blocks: 874 (1.3 bpg)
- Stats at NBA.com
- Stats at Basketball Reference
Medals
Men's basketball
Representing France
EuroBasket
Silver medal – second place	2011 Lithuania	Team

Joakim Simon Noah (/ˈdʒoʊəkɪm/ JOH-ə-kim; born February 25, 1985) is a former professional basketball player. Born in New York, Noah was a member of the France national team and played college basketball for the Florida Gators, winning back-to-back NCAA championships in 2006 and 2007. The Chicago Bulls selected Noah with the ninth overall pick in the 2007 NBA draft. Noah is a two-time NBA All-Star and was named to the All-NBA First Team in 2014 when he also was named the NBA Defensive Player of the Year.

== Early life ==
Noah was born in Manhattan, New York, to French singer and former world No. 3 tennis player Yannick Noah, winner of the French Open in 1983, and Cécilia Rodhe, Miss Sweden and fourth runner-up at Miss Universe 1978. His grandfather Zacharie Noah was a Cameroonian professional football player, winner of the Coupe de France in 1961. Noah lived in Paris, France, from 1988 to 1998 and returned to New York City at age 13.

He played youth basketball with the youth teams of the French club Levallois Sporting Club, in Paris. He played high school basketball for the United Nations International School, Poly Prep Country Day School and The Lawrenceville School.

Considered a four-star recruit by Rivals.com, Noah was listed as the No. 19 power forward and the No. 75 player in the nation in 2004.

== College career ==
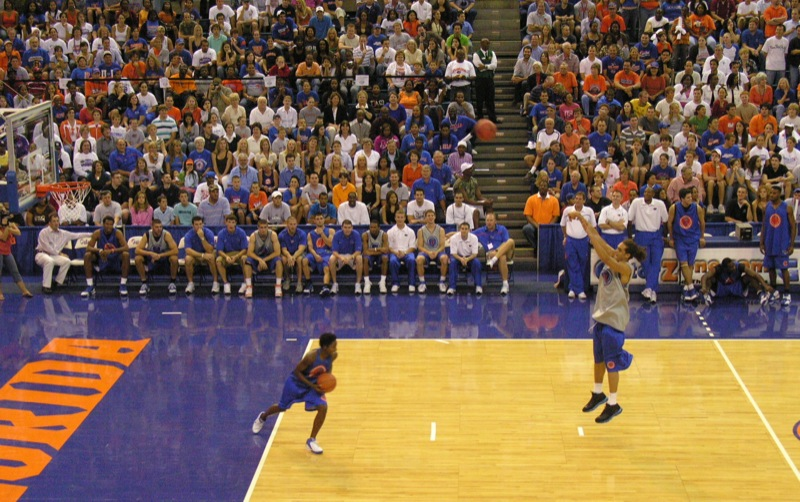
Noah during Midnight Madness with Sha Brooks during a 3-point shootout (October 13, 2006)

Noah accepted an athletic scholarship to attend the University of Florida, where he played for coach Billy Donovan's Florida Gators men's basketball team from 2004 to 2007. Noah was a member of Donovan's 2004 recruiting class, a group that included four freshmen who would have a dramatic impact on the Gators basketball program during the next three seasons. During his 2004–05 freshman year, he played 9.4 minutes per game and averaged only 3.5 points and 2.5 rebounds per game.

During Noah's 2005–06 sophomore year, he was listed as power forward but was moved to center to replace Al Horford, and in that position he led his team in points (14.2 ppg) and blocks (2.4 bpg), while ranking second in rebounds (7.1 rpg) behind teammate Al Horford (7.6 rpg). Almost unknown at the beginning of the season, Noah's projected draft position improved over time. By the end of the NCAA Division I men's basketball tournament, he had declared for the 2006 NBA draft. However, Noah, along with teammates Horford and Corey Brewer, announced at the Gators' national championship celebration that they would return for their junior seasons. Noah and the Florida Gators would go on to repeat as 2006–07 national champions.

Noah was named the Most Outstanding Player (MOP) of the NCAA Tournament's Minneapolis Regional after leading the Gators over top-seeded Villanova in the final game with 26 points, 15 rebounds, and 5 blocks. On April 3, 2006, 2006 NCAA Men's Division I Basketball Championship Game Noah paced the Gators to a 73–57 victory over the UCLA Bruins for the school's first NCAA basketball championship and was named the Most Outstanding Player of the Final Four. In the final game, he scored 16 points, made 9 rebounds, and blocked a championship game record 6 shots.

The next year after the Gators won the 2006 NCAA Division I men's basketball tournament, they went forward to the next year with five returning starters. Noah started off the tournament with 17 points and 12 rebounds in 24 minutes of play in a win vs. the Jackson State Tigers. In the second round, Noah scored nine points and had nine rebounds in a win vs. the Purdue Boilermakers. The Purdue game, Butler Bulldogs game, and Ohio State championship game were the only three games he did not have double digit rebounds in the tournament; although he had nine rebounds in two of those games. He had a tournament high, 14 points and 14 rebounds in the Elite Eight in a win vs. the Oregon Ducks. In the championship game vs. the Ohio State Buckeyes, he was in a match-up against the future 2007 NBA Draft number one pick, Greg Oden. Regardless, he was still able to score eight points and grab three rebounds, although getting into foul trouble. He also was perfect from the free throw line, making six shots on six attempts. With the help of Noah on both the offensive and defensive sides of the ball, the Florida Gators were able to win their second championship in two years.

== Professional career ==
=== Chicago Bulls (2007–2016) ===
==== Early years (2007–2012) ====
The Chicago Bulls selected Noah as the ninth overall pick in the 2007 NBA draft. Noah and his teammates at Florida, Corey Brewer and Al Horford, became the highest-picked trio from the same college in the history of the NBA. Horford was chosen third overall by the Atlanta Hawks, and Brewer was chosen seventh overall by the Minnesota Timberwolves. On November 6, 2007, Noah made his regular season debut off the bench after missing the first three games with a sprained ankle. He scored 2 points and had 4 rebounds. Noah had a rocky start with his team after being given a suspension by a unanimous vote from his teammates in January 2008 following a confrontation with assistant coach Ron Adams.

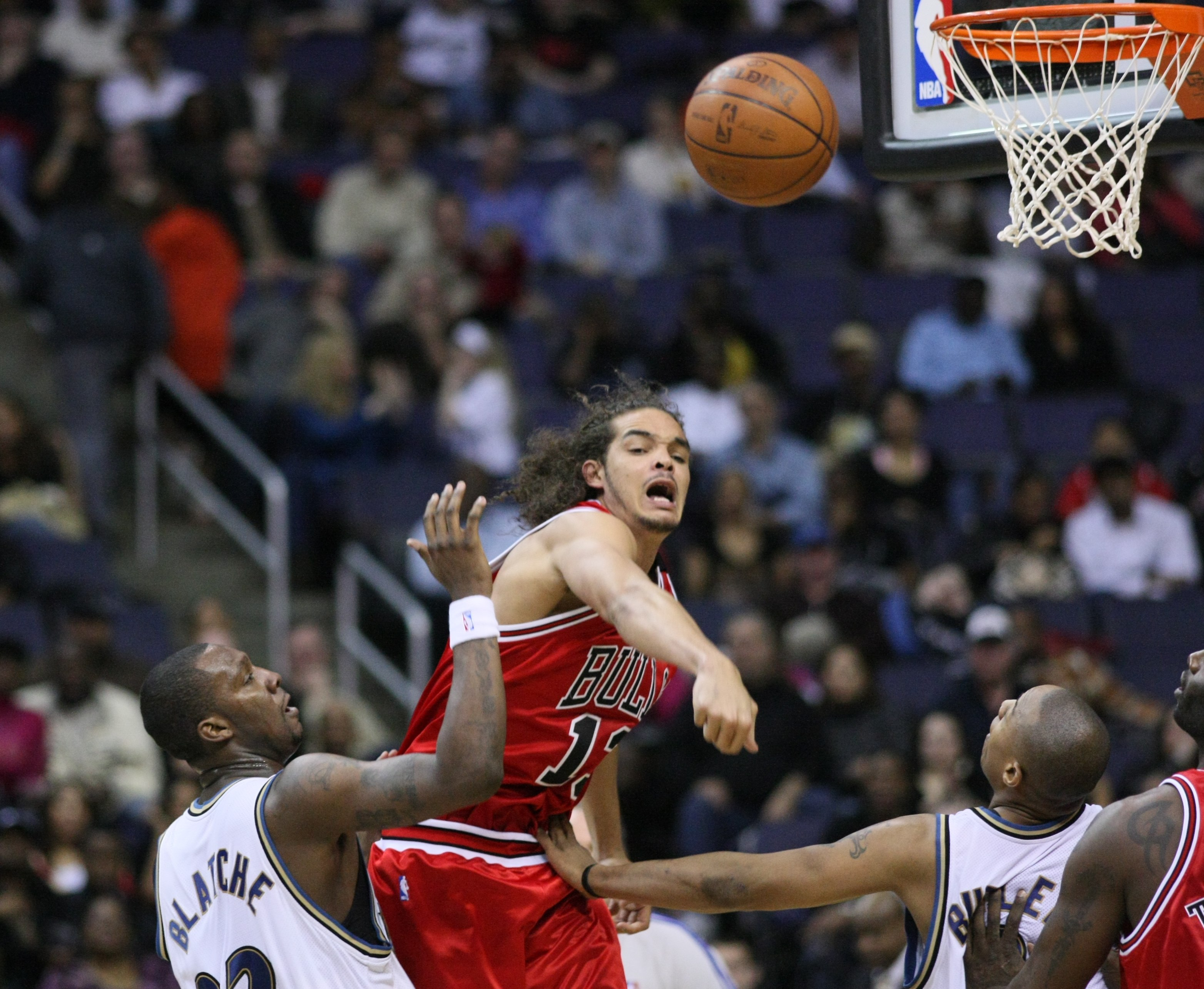
Noah with the Bulls in February 2009

Noah averaged 6.7 points and 7.6 rebounds per game during the 2008–09 regular season. Noah played a key role in Game 6 of the 2009 Eastern Conference first-round playoff series between the Bulls and the Boston Celtics. In the final minute of the game's third overtime period, with the score tied at 123–123, he stole the ball from Paul Pierce and dribbled down the court (unusual for a center) for a dunk, drawing Pierce's sixth foul in the process. The Bulls went on to win the game 128–127, though they would lose the series in Game 7.

During the 2009–10 season, Noah averaged 10.7 points and 11.0 rebounds per game. He only played 64 games due to injury. The Bulls once again made the playoffs, securing the 8th seed in the Eastern Conference. In the playoffs, Noah averaged 14.8 points per game and 13.0 rebounds, but the Bulls lost to the Cleveland Cavaliers in the first round in five games.

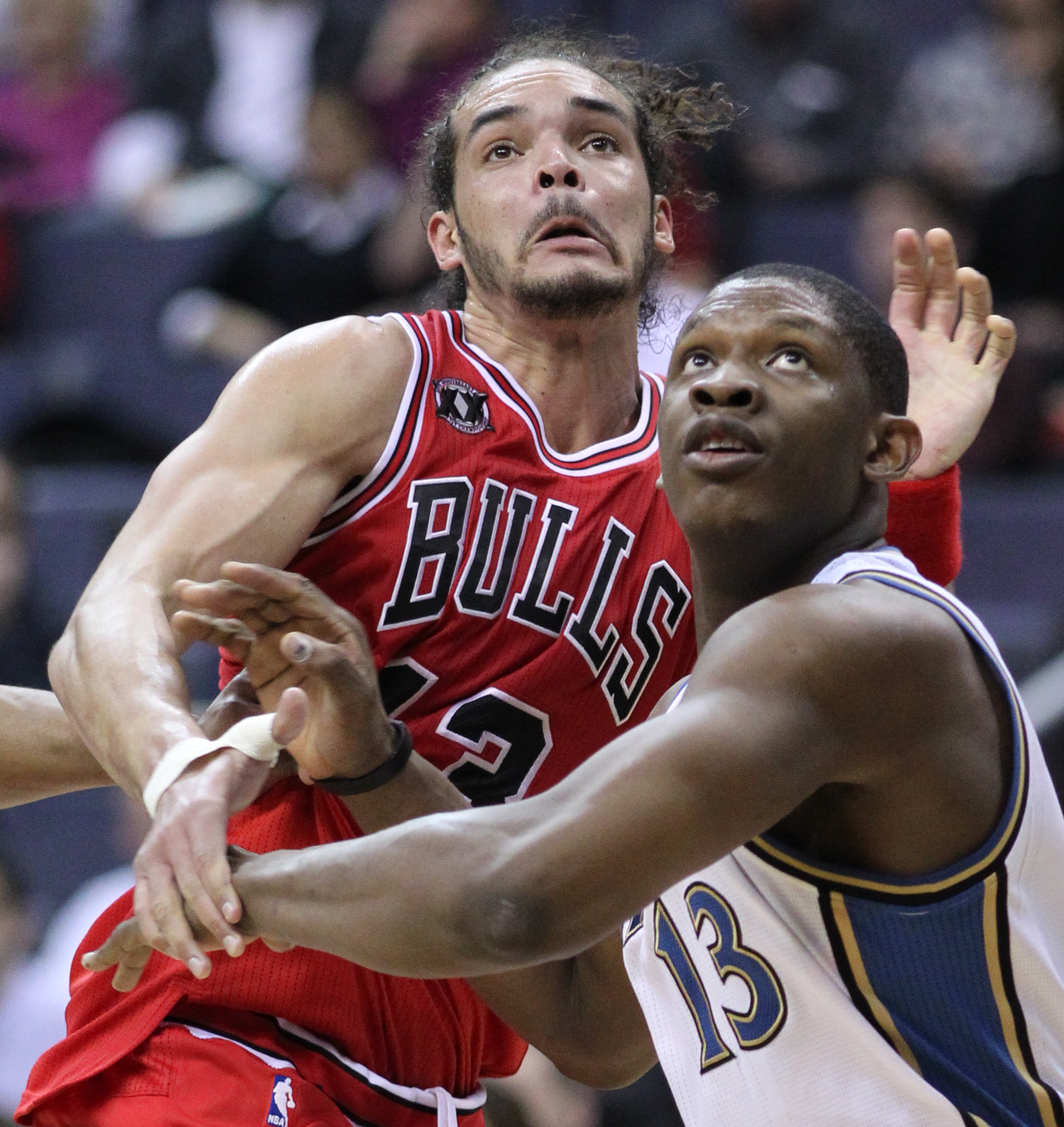
Noah with the Bulls in February 2011, contesting with Kevin Séraphin of the Washington Wizards

On October 4, 2010, Noah signed a five-year, $60 million contract extension with the Bulls. On December 15, 2010, the Bulls announced that due to ligament damage in Noah's hand, he would have surgery and miss 8 to 10 weeks. Noah was averaging 14 points and 11.7 rebounds in the 24 games prior to his injury. He returned to action in the 55th game of the season on February 23 after recuperating from right thumb surgery. He scored 7 points and had 16 rebounds in just over 24 minutes. He returned to the inactive list for games 74, 75 and 76.

On February 22, 2012, Noah recorded his first career triple-double with 13 points, 13 rebounds, and 10 assists in a game against the Milwaukee Bucks. It was the first triple-double by a Bulls center since Artis Gilmore recorded one in 1977.

==== First All-Star selection (2012–2013) ====
On December 7, 2012, Noah recorded his career highs of 30 points and 23 rebounds in a win against the Detroit Pistons. On December 18, 2012, he recorded his second ever triple-double, scoring 11 points, grabbing 13 rebounds and providing a career-high-tying 10 assists, in a 100–89 victory over the Boston Celtics. On January 24, 2013, Noah was named as a reserve in the 2013 NBA All-Star Game, representing the Chicago Bulls alongside teammate Luol Deng. He became the Bulls' first All-Star center since Artis Gilmore in 1982. He played 16 minutes in the game, scoring 8 points and collecting 10 rebounds in the East's loss. On February 28, 2013, Noah recorded his third career triple-double, scoring 23 points, collecting 21 rebounds and blocking a career-high 11 shots in Chicago's 93–82 victory over the Philadelphia 76ers. In doing so, Noah joined Hakeem Olajuwon, Kareem Abdul-Jabbar, Shawn Bradley, Shaquille O'Neal, and Elvin Hayes as the only players to record a triple-double of 20-20-10 in points, rebounds, and blocks since blocks began being recorded, and the only player among them to do so while shooting 65 percent from the field.

==== Defensive Player of the Year award (2013–2014) ====
From December 28, 2013, to February 1, 2014, Noah had an 18-game streak of 10 or more rebounds, averaging 13.9 rebounds during that stretch. The streak ended on February 3, 2014, in a game against the Sacramento Kings as Noah was ejected from the game after complaining due to a controversial foul call against him. Noah erupted and verbally abused the referees, resulting in a $15,000 fine from the NBA. On January 30, 2014, Noah was named a reserve in the 2014 NBA All-Star Game for the second time in his career. He played 21 minutes in the game (including the entire fourth quarter) and scored 8 points, collected 5 rebounds and had 5 assists while helping the East to win 163–155. On February 11, 2014, Noah recorded his fourth career triple-double in a 100–85 win against the Atlanta Hawks, finishing the game with 19 points, 16 rebounds and 11 assists. On February 19, 2014, Joakim accounted for 13 assists in a 94–92 road win against the Toronto Raptors. By doing so, he became the first NBA center with 3 games of 10+ assists in a season since Brad Miller of the Sacramento Kings in 2005–06 and the only center with 13 assists in a game since Vlade Divac in April 1996.

On March 2, 2014, Noah recorded his fifth career triple-double with 13 points, 12 rebounds and 14 assists in a 109–90 win over the New York Knicks. Noah's 14 assists was the most ever by a Bulls center, and the most by a center in the NBA since 1986. Three days later, in a 105–94 win over the Detroit Pistons, Noah recorded yet another triple-double finishing the game with 10 points, 11 rebounds and 11 assists. Joakim finished the month of March with 120 assists, the most by an NBA center since Wilt Chamberlain had 155 in March 1968. On April 9, 2014, Noah had 15 points, 13 rebounds and 10 assists in a 102–87 road win against the Minnesota Timberwolves, his fourth triple-double of the season. On April 21, 2014, Noah was awarded the NBA Defensive Player of the Year award for the first time in his career. He is the second Chicago Bull to win the award, after Michael Jordan who won it in the 1987–88 season, he also became the first Frenchman to win the award, the 4th international to win, and the second European overall to win. He finished the 2013-14 campaign fourth in MVP voting.

On June 4, 2014, Noah was named to the 2014 All-NBA first team.

==== Final years in Chicago (2014–2016) ====
On January 27, 2015, Noah had a season-best game with 18 points and 15 rebounds in a 113–111 overtime win over the Golden State Warriors. He finished the season averaging 7.2 points and 9.6 rebounds, his lowest averages since the 2009–10 season.

Noah lost his starting spot to Nikola Mirotić during the 2015 preseason, coming off the bench in his first 23 consecutive games of the 2015–16 season. Following a quadruple overtime loss to the Detroit Pistons on December 18, starting center Pau Gasol did not travel to New York for the Bulls' December 19 game against the Knicks. In his absence, Noah started in his first game of the season and subsequently scored a season-high 21 points. He also grabbed 10 rebounds in the game, six of them offensive, thus becoming the Bulls' career leader in offensive boards, passing Horace Grant (1,888). On December 23, he was ruled out for two to four weeks because of a slight tear within his sprained left shoulder, an injury he suffered in the Bulls' December 21 game against the Brooklyn Nets. After missing nine consecutive games with the injury, he returned to action on January 11, recording 9 rebounds and 4 assists off the bench in a loss to the Washington Wizards. On January 14, he made just his second start of the season, replacing the injured Pau Gasol. In 38 minutes of action, he recorded 6 points, 16 rebounds, 8 assists, 2 steals and 1 block in a 115–111 overtime win over the Philadelphia 76ers. In the next game the following night, Noah re-injured his left shoulder against the Dallas Mavericks. He was subsequently ruled out for four to six months after it was determined that he required surgery to stabilize his left shoulder.

=== New York Knicks (2016–2018) ===
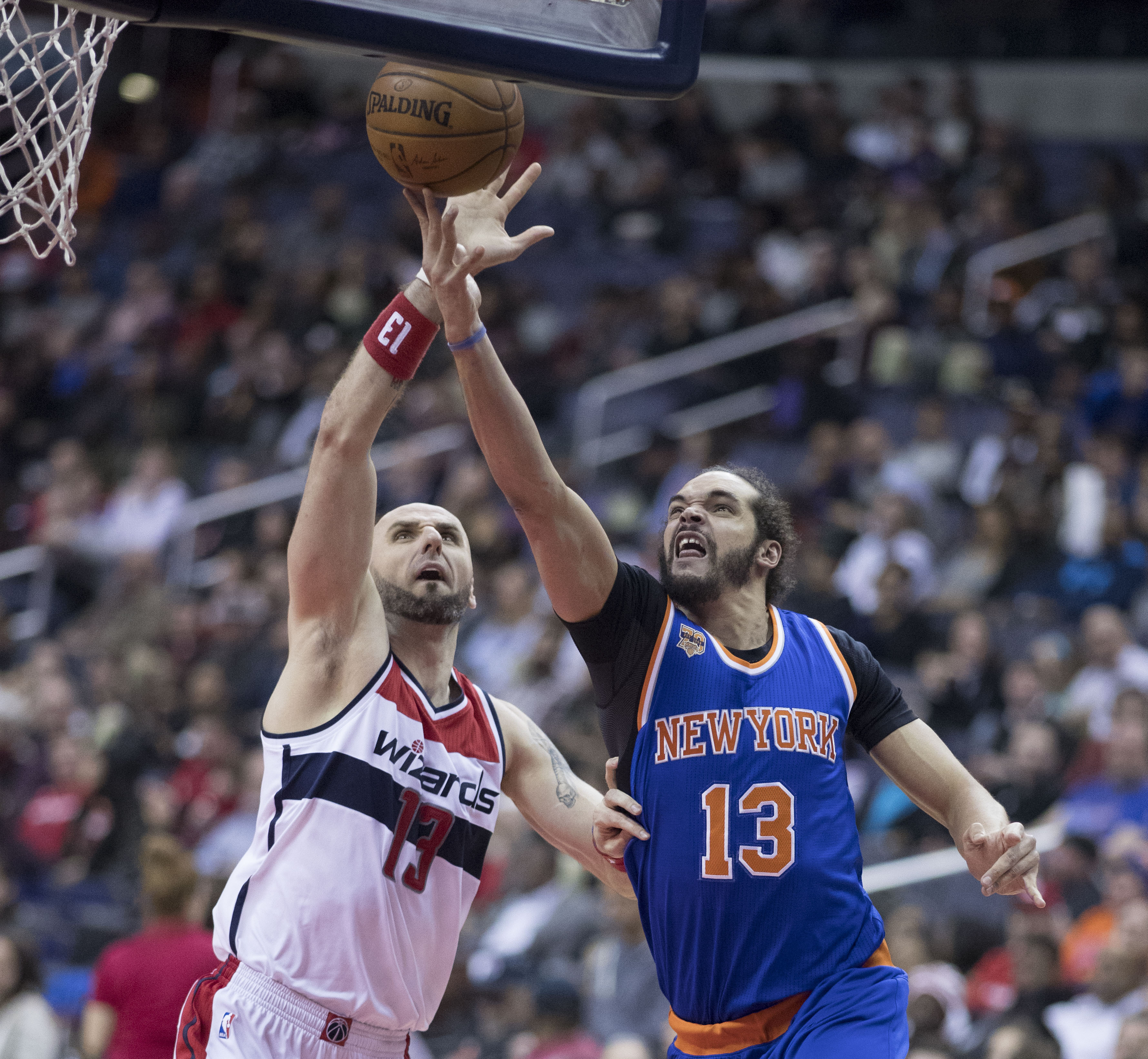
Noah with the Knicks in 2017 shooting over Marcin Gortat

On July 8, 2016, Noah signed a four-year, $72 million contract with his hometown team, the New York Knicks. A questionable contract at the time, it was later labeled "disastrous" and the "worst signing in franchise history". On February 27, 2017, he underwent a left knee arthroscopy to remove a loose body, and was subsequently ruled out for at least three to four weeks. On March 25, 2017, Noah was suspended for 20 games without pay for violating the league's anti-drug policy after testing positive for LGD-4033, a selective androgen receptor modulator that he later said was in a supplement he took for injuries. Noah, having not played since February 4, was likely to miss the Knicks' final 10 games of the season because of a left knee injury anyway. The suspension carried over into the first 10 games of the 2017–18 season. Noah, unaware of his violation, did not appeal his suspension. On April 12, 2017, it was deemed that Noah required surgery for a left torn rotator cuff and would need four to six months to rehabilitate.

On November 27, 2017, the Knicks activated Noah and gave him his first playing time since February. Noah entered the Knicks' contest against the Portland Trail Blazers in the second quarter and had a three-minute stint, making his only shot attempt and grabbing a rebound. Two days later, he was assigned to the Westchester Knicks of the NBA G League for a one-day stint, playing for Westchester that night in a loss against the Maine Red Claws. In January 2018, Noah went into exile from the Knicks after having a heated verbal altercation with coach Jeff Hornacek. Noah appeared in just seven games during the 2017–18 season, averaging 5.7 minutes off the bench.

On October 13, 2018, the Knicks released Noah via the stretch-provision waiver. Using the stretch provision allowed the Knicks to save $12.6 million in cap space in 2019. Noah, who had $38 million left on his contract, was reluctant to give up any money on the remaining two years of his deal. The delay in waiving him was as a result of the Knicks trying to get Noah to give up more money in a buyout.

=== Memphis Grizzlies (2018–2019) ===
On December 4, 2018, Noah signed with the Memphis Grizzlies for the remainder of the season. On February 9, 2019, he had season highs of 19 points and 14 rebounds in a 99–90 win over the New Orleans Pelicans. On February 22, 2019, he recorded 22 points (with 12 free throws) and 11 rebounds in a loss to the Los Angeles Clippers.

=== Los Angeles Clippers (2020) ===
On March 9, 2020, Noah signed a 10-day contract with the Los Angeles Clippers, and signed a multi-year contract on June 28. On December 1, Noah was waived by the Clippers.

Noah announced his retirement from professional basketball on March 1, 2021.

On October 28, 2021, the Chicago Bulls hosted a "Joakim Noah Night" in honor of Noah, where he was named an ambassador for the team.

== National team career ==
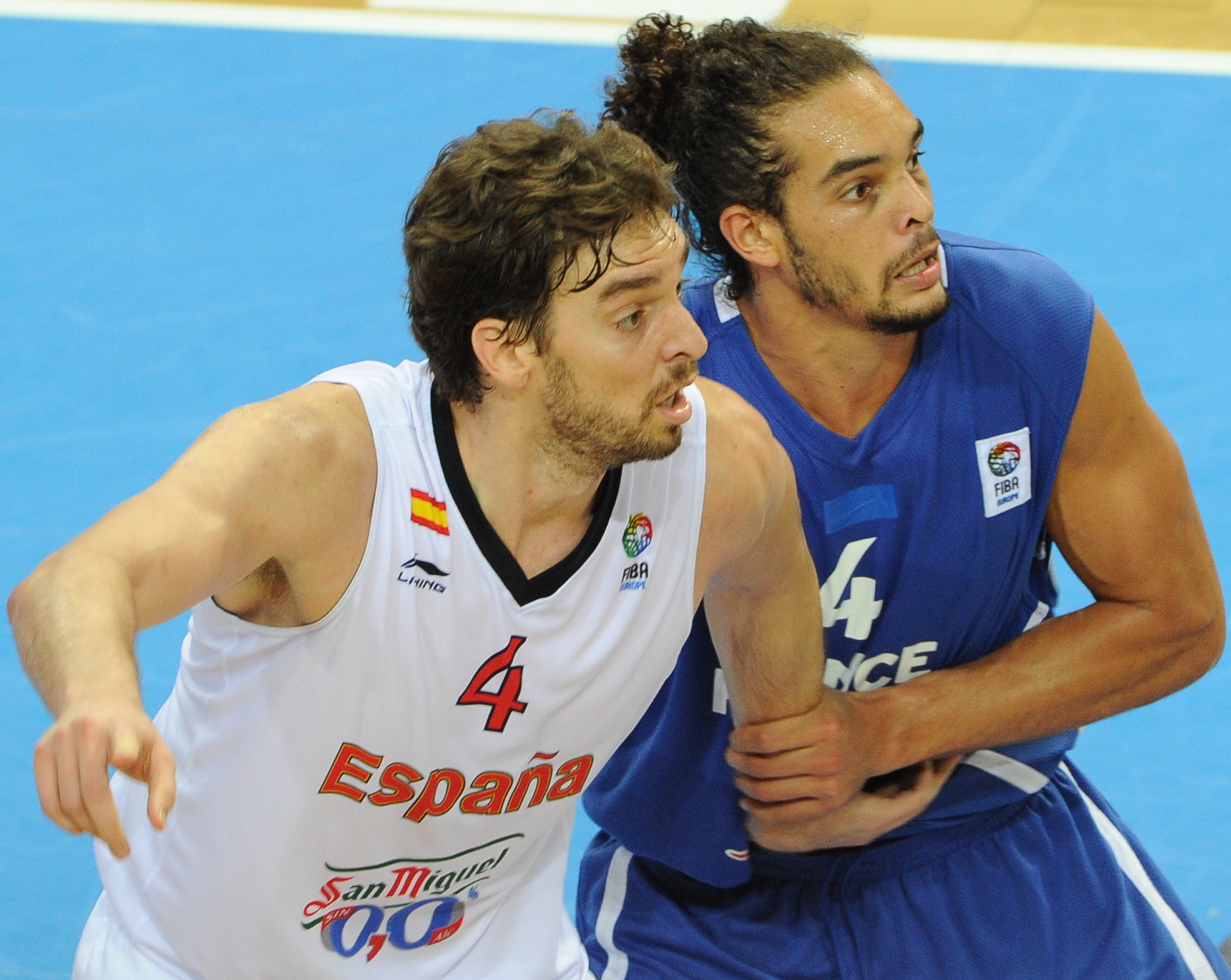
Noah (right) guarding Pau Gasol while playing for France in EuroBasket 2011.

Noah holds citizenship to France, the United States and Sweden, though chose to play for the senior France national basketball team, stating that it was the country he had wanted to represent.

Noah made his first appearance for the senior France national team on July 24, 2009, in a friendly match against Austria, in which he scored 16 points and grabbed 9 rebounds. Noah then joined the French team at EuroBasket 2011.

He did not join the French Olympic team for the London 2012 Summer Olympics, due to a serious ankle injury that occurred during the 2012 NBA playoffs. Noah said that he needed more time and rehabilitation work before he would be ready to play again.

== Player profile ==
Noah had one of the most unconventional shooting styles in NBA history, shooting a two-handed push shot that was regularly described as "awkward" or "unorthodox". At a pick-up basketball game at the White House in 2010, President Barack Obama, a fellow Chicagoan, was matched up against Noah and as good-natured trash-talk, told him “Where’d you get that shot? That’s the ugliest shot I’ve ever seen”. Despite his unusual shooting style, Noah averaged 70.0% from the free throw line for his career, just slightly below average for the NBA.

== Personal life ==
Noah holds citizenships with the United States, France, and Sweden. His zodiac sign is Pisces.

In 2010, with his mother, an artist, Noah founded the Noah's Arc Foundation to help engage children with positive self-expression through arts and sports. The foundation has a special focus on at-risk youth in Chicago. As a registered United Nations non-governmental organization (NGO), in 2015 the Foundation was granted special consultative status to the United Nations Economic and Social Council (ECOSOC).

Noah began dating Brazilian model Lais Ribeiro in July 2018. In September 2019, they became engaged at Burning Man. On July 13, 2022, Noah and Ribiero were married in Trancoso in her native country Brazil.

In June 2024, during his first Philippines visit, Noah served as a global liquor brand ambassador. He conducted an NBA Jr. clinic at the Gatorade Hoops Center and played pickup basketball with young Filipino talents in Mandaluyong. He also reminisced on his friendship with Lenny Cooke since his youth, who played with the PBA in the 2000s.

== Awards ==
=== NCAA ===
- 2006 Associated Press (AP) All-SEC First Team
- Named an Honorable Mention All-American by AP.
- Most Outstanding Player in the 2006 Final Four
- NCAA Division I men's basketball champion – 2006, 2007

=== NBA ===
- 2× NBA All-Star: 2013, 2014
- NBA Defensive Player of the Year: 2014
- All-NBA First Team: 2014
- 2× NBA All-Defensive First Team: 2013, 2014
- NBA All-Defensive Second Team: 2011
- J. Walter Kennedy Citizenship Award: (2015)

== Career statistics ==
Legend
GP	Games played	GS	Games started	MPG	Minutes per game
FG%	Field goal percentage	3P%	3-point field goal percentage	FT%	Free throw percentage
RPG	Rebounds per game	APG	Assists per game	SPG	Steals per game
BPG	Blocks per game	PPG	Points per game	**Bold**	Career high

=== NBA ===
==== Regular season ====
Year	Team	GP	GS	MPG	FG%	3P%	FT%	RPG	APG	SPG	BPG	PPG
2007–08	Chicago	74	31	20.7	.482	.000	.691	5.6	1.1	.9	.9	6.6
2008–09	Chicago	**80**	55	24.2	**.556**	.000	.676	7.6	1.3	.6	1.4	6.7
2009–10	Chicago	64	54	30.1	.504	—	.744	11.0	2.1	.5	1.6	10.7
2010–11	Chicago	48	48	32.8	.525	.000	**.764**	10.4	2.2	1.0	1.5	11.7
2011–12	Chicago	64	64	30.4	.508	.000	.748	9.8	2.5	.6	1.4	10.2
2012–13	Chicago	66	64	**36.8**	.481	.000	.751	11.1	4.0	**1.2**	**2.1**	11.9
2013–14	Chicago	**80**	**80**	35.3	.475	.000	.737	**11.3**	**5.4**	**1.2**	1.5	**12.6**
2014–15	Chicago	67	67	30.6	.445	.000	.603	9.6	4.7	.7	1.1	7.2
2015–16	Chicago	29	2	21.9	.383	.000	.489	8.8	3.8	.6	1.0	4.3
2016–17	New York	46	46	22.1	.490	.000	.436	8.8	2.2	.7	.8	5.0
2017–18	New York	7	0	5.7	.500	—	.500	2.0	.6	.3	.3	1.7
2018–19	Memphis	42	1	16.5	.516	.000	.716	5.7	2.1	.5	.7	7.1
2019–20	L.A. Clippers	5	0	10.0	.500	.000	.750	3.2	1.4	.2	.2	2.8
Career		672	512	27.7	.491	.000	.700	9.0	2.8	.8	1.3	8.8
All-Star		2	0	18.5	.667	.000	.000	7.5	4.0	.5	.5	8.0

==== Playoffs ====
Year	Team	GP	GS	MPG	FG%	3P%	FT%	RPG	APG	SPG	BPG	PPG
2009	Chicago	7	7	38.7	.510	—	.760	**13.1**	2.3	.9	2.1	10.1
2010	Chicago	5	5	36.6	.528	—	**.947**	13.0	2.6	**1.8**	1.4	14.8
2011	Chicago	**16**	**16**	33.1	.411	—	.725	10.2	2.5	1.0	2.1	8.7
2012	Chicago	3	3	33.0	**.731**	—	.636	9.3	3.0	.7	1.3	**15.0**
2013	Chicago	12	12	34.1	.437	—	.641	9.6	2.3	.8	**2.2**	10.8
2014	Chicago	5	5	**42.0**	.512	—	.588	12.8	**4.6**	.8	1.4	10.4
2015	Chicago	12	12	32.9	.408	—	.650	11.0	3.2	.8	1.2	5.8
2020	L.A. Clippers	2	0	1.0	—	—	—	.0	.0	.0	.0	.0
Career		62	60	33.9	.465	—	.676	10.6	2.7	.9	1.7	9.3

=== NBA G League ===
==== Regular season ====
Year	Team	GP	GS	MPG	FG%	3P%	FT%	RPG	APG	SPG	BPG	PPG
2017-18	Westchester	1	1	23.0	.800	—	1.000	5.0	4.0	1.0	1.0	9.0

=== College ===
Year	Team	GP	GS	MPG	FG%	3P%	FT%	RPG	APG	SPG	BPG	PPG
2004–05	Florida	29	0	9.4	.600	—	.577	2.5	.5	.2	.7	3.5
2005–06	Florida	39	38	24.9	**.627**	.000	**.733**	7.1	2.1	**1.1**	**2.4**	**14.2**
2006–07	Florida	**40**	**40**	**25.9**	.607	**1.000**	.663	**8.4**	**2.3**	**1.1**	1.8	12.0
Career		108	78	21.1	.616	.500	.684	6.4	1.7	.9	1.7	10.5

== See also ==
- List of Florida Gators in the NBA
- List of people banned or suspended by the NBA
