= Taj Gibson =

American basketball player (born 1985)

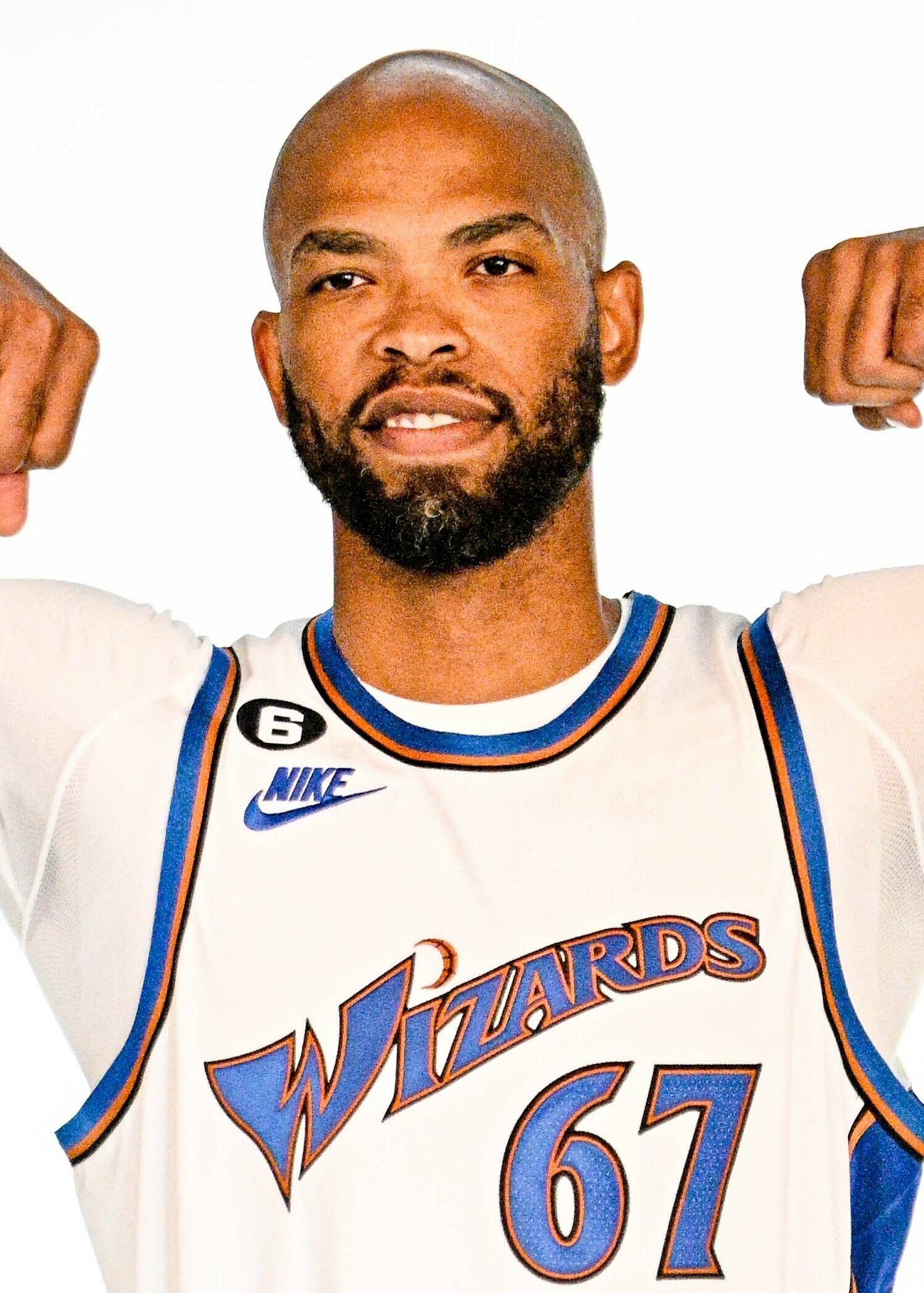
- Gibson with the Washington Wizards in 2022

Chicago Bulls
- Title: Assistant coach
- League: NBA

Personal information
- Born: June 24, 1985 (age 41) Brooklyn, New York, U.S.
- Listed height: 6 ft 9 in (2.06 m)
- Listed weight: 232 lb (105 kg)

Career information
- High school: High School of Telecommunication Arts and Technology (Brooklyn, New York); Stoneridge Prep (Tarzana, California); Calvary Christian (San Fernando, California)
- College: USC (2006–2009)
- NBA draft: 2009: 1st round, 26th overall pick
- Drafted by: Chicago Bulls
- Playing career: 2009–2026
- Position: Center / power forward
- Number: 22, 67
- Coaching career: 2026–present

Career history

Playing
- 2009–2017: Chicago Bulls
- 2017: Oklahoma City Thunder
- 2017–2019: Minnesota Timberwolves
- 2019–2022: New York Knicks
- 2022–2023: Washington Wizards
- 2023–2024: New York Knicks
- 2024: Detroit Pistons
- 2024–2025: Charlotte Hornets
- 2026: Memphis Grizzlies

Coaching
- 2026–present: Chicago Bulls (assistant)

Career highlights
- NBA All-Rookie First Team (2010); Second-team All-Pac-10 (2009); Third-team All-Pac-10 (2008); Pac-10 Defensive Player of the Year (2009); Pac-10 All Defensive Team (2009)

Career statistics
- Points: 8,431 (8.3 ppg)
- Rebounds: 5,754 (5.7 rpg)
- Assists: 952 (0.9 apg)
- Stats at NBA.com
- Stats at Basketball Reference

Taj Jami Gibson (born June 24, 1985) is an American professional basketball coach and former player who is an assistant coach for the Chicago Bulls of the National Basketball Association (NBA). He played college basketball for the USC Trojans and was selected 26th overall by the Bulls in the 2009 NBA draft. A power forward and center, Gibson had a 17-year career in the NBA as a player, playing for the Chicago Bulls, Oklahoma City Thunder, Minnesota Timberwolves, New York Knicks, Washington Wizards, Detroit Pistons, Charlotte Hornets, and Memphis Grizzlies.

== Early life ==
Gibson was born on June 24, 1985, in Brooklyn, New York. He attended P.S. 67 Charles A. Dorsey School in Brooklyn's Fort Greene neighborhood. Gibson began his high school career at Brooklyn's High School of Telecommunication Arts and Technology. He then attended Stoneridge Prep as a sophomore and junior in Tarzana, California. During his senior year in 2006, he attended Calvary Christian in San Fernando, California.

== College career ==
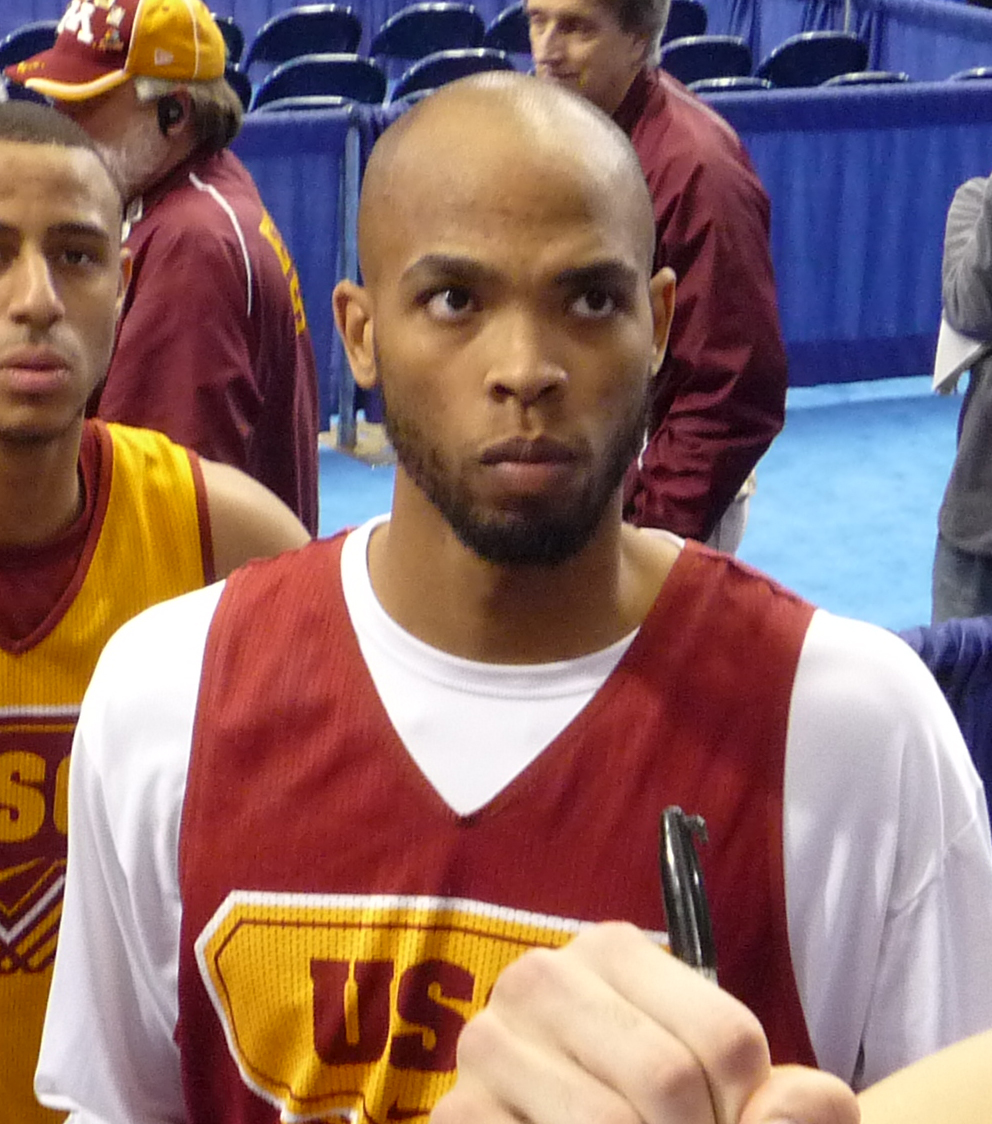
Gibson during a practice at the NCAA tournament, 2009

Gibson played at the University of Southern California, where he was a member of the Phi Kappa Psi fraternity. As one of the oldest freshmen in the country, he was 21 years old in 2007. Gibson was named to the Pac-10 All-Freshman team and helped beat rival UCLA in 2008. Gibson was named to the 2009 All-Pac 10 Tournament Team by helping the Trojans win the Pacific-10 tournament championship at the Staples Center.

== Professional career ==
=== Chicago Bulls (2009–2017) ===
Gibson declared for the 2009 NBA draft, and was selected 26th overall by the Chicago Bulls. Along with fellow draft pick James Johnson, he signed with the Bulls in July 2009. Gibson was the starting power forward for most of his rookie season with the Bulls and impressed many people with his high energy and good defense. During the All-Star Weekend, Gibson played in the Rookie Challenge, where the Rookie team won for the first time since 2002. The Bulls made the playoffs, securing the 8th seed in the Eastern Conference. Gibson averaged 7.6 points per game and 7.0 rebounds while the Bulls lost to the Cleveland Cavaliers in the first round. At the end of his first season, he was selected to the NBA All-Rookie First Team.

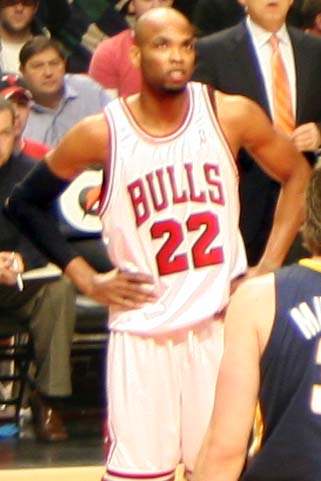
Gibson with the Bulls in 2009

During the 2010 off-season, the Bulls signed power forward Carlos Boozer, who was expected to start at the beginning of the season rather than Gibson. But Boozer broke his hand before the pre-season, and Gibson started the first 15 games of the season. After Boozer's return, Gibson moved into a bench role for most of the season. He was selected as a starter for the Sophomore squad in the 2011 NBA Rising Stars challenge at the All-Star weekend, which the Rookie team won 148–140. Gibson played 18 minutes and recorded 8 points. At the end of the season, the Bulls made the playoffs as the first seed in the Eastern Conference. On May 10, 2011, Gibson helped his team take a 3–2 lead in the Eastern Conference semifinals against Atlanta, scoring all of his 11 points in the fourth quarter.

In May 2012, Gibson was named to the US Select Team, joining Jeremy Lin, DeMarcus Cousins, and Kyrie Irving in practicing with the US Olympic Team in preparation for the 2012 Summer Olympics in London. On October 31, 2012, Gibson signed a four-year, $33 million rookie scale contract extension with the Bulls. Playing mostly a bench role in 2013–14, Gibson averaged 13 points and 6.8 rebounds on the season and was among the league leaders in blocked shots per game. He finished second in the NBA's Sixth Man of the Year Award, losing to Jamal Crawford. On June 16, 2015, Gibson underwent arthroscopic surgery on his left ankle and was ruled out for four months. During the 2015–16 season, he appeared in 73 games and averaged 8.6 points and 6.9 rebounds.

=== Oklahoma City Thunder (2017) ===
On February 23, 2017, Gibson was traded, along with Doug McDermott and an unprotected 2018 second-round draft pick, to the Oklahoma City Thunder in exchange for Joffrey Lauvergne, Anthony Morrow, and Cameron Payne.

=== Minnesota Timberwolves (2017–2019) ===
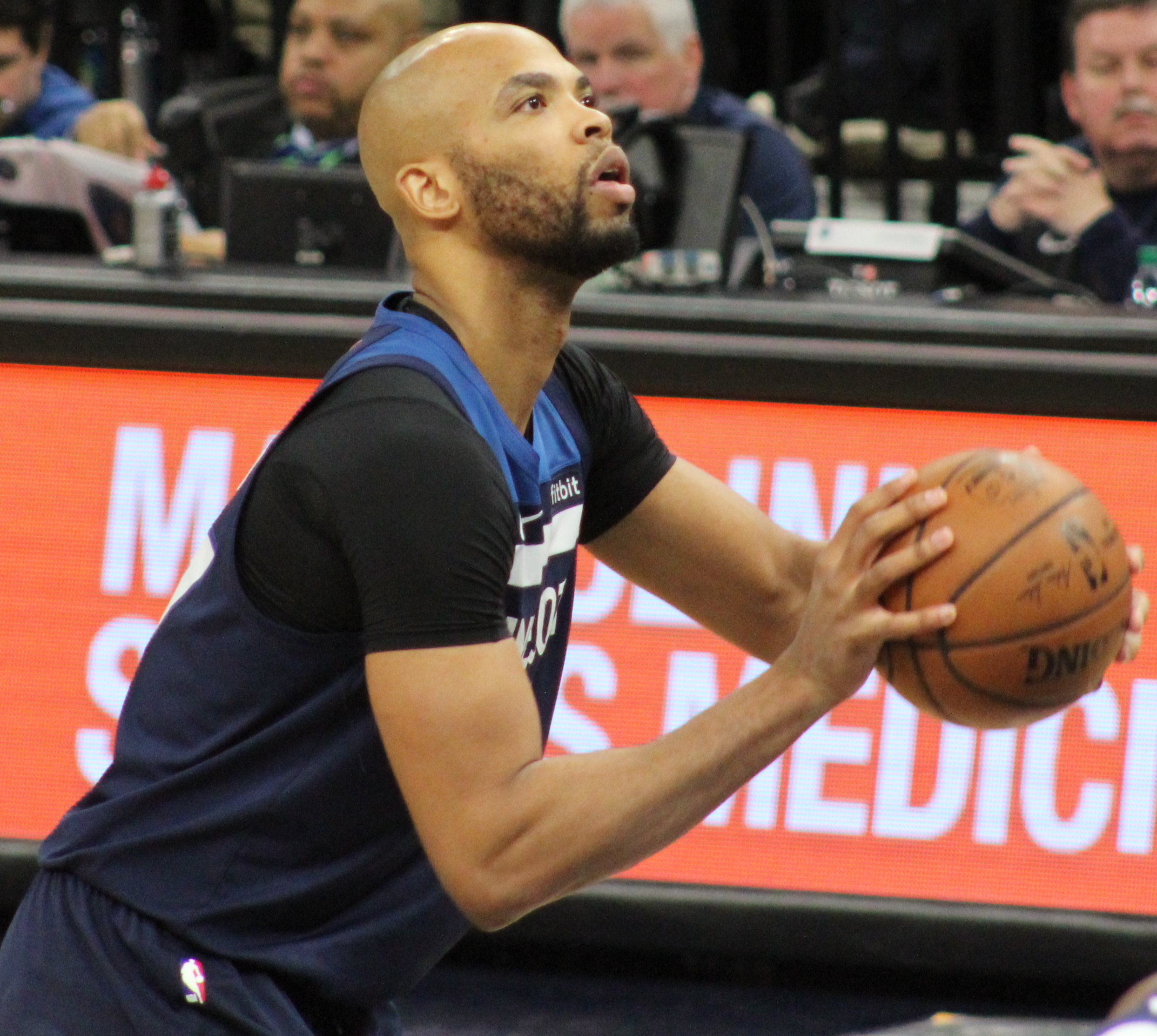
Gibson with the Timberwolves in 2019

On July 10, 2017, Gibson signed a two-year, $28 million contract with the Minnesota Timberwolves, reuniting himself with coach Tom Thibodeau. He became the second NBA player ever to wear No. 67, in honor of his Brooklyn elementary school, P.S. 67. On November 22, 2017, he scored a season-high 24 points in a 124–118 win over the Orlando Magic. On February 15, 2018, Gibson scored a season-high 28 points against the Los Angeles Lakers.

=== New York Knicks (2019–2022) ===
On July 9, 2019, Gibson signed a two-year, $20 million contract with his hometown team the New York Knicks. On November 19, 2020, the Knicks waived Gibson. On January 7, 2021, Gibson re-signed with the Knicks for the remainder of the season. On August 18, 2021, Gibson re-signed on two-year, $10.1 million contract, after initially agreeing to a one-year minimum deal. He was waived again on July 8, 2022.

=== Washington Wizards (2022–2023) ===
On July 19, 2022, Gibson signed with the Washington Wizards on a one-year minimum contract.

On September 15, 2023, Gibson re-signed with the Wizards on another one-year minimum contract, but was waived on October 23.

=== Return to New York (2023–2024) ===
On December 15, 2023, Gibson signed a one-year deal with the New York Knicks, returning for a second stint with the franchise. However, he was waived on January 7, 2024. After two weeks, Gibson signed consecutive 10-day contracts on January 30 and February 10 respectively. He played in 16 games (starting one) for the Knicks, logging averages of 1.0 points, 1.8 rebounds, and 0.6 assists.

=== Detroit Pistons (2024) ===
On March 6, 2024, Gibson signed a 10-day contract with the Detroit Pistons followed by a rest-of-season contract on March 16. Gibson made four appearances for Detroit, averaging 4.5 points, 2.3 rebounds, and 0.5 assists.

=== Charlotte Hornets (2024–2025) ===
On July 13, 2024, Gibson signed a one-year, $3.3 million contract with the Charlotte Hornets. On April 9, 2025, Gibson played his 1,000th NBA game, in a loss to the Toronto Raptors. He finished with two points and five rebounds in 16 minutes off the bench. Gibson made 37 total appearances (including 11 starts) for Charlotte during the regular season, posting averages of 2.9 points, 3.2 rebounds, and 0.6 assists.

=== Memphis Grizzlies (2026) ===
On February 26, 2026, Gibson signed a two-year, $4.8 million contract with the Memphis Grizzlies. He appeared in 10 games (including one start) for the Grizzlies, averaging 3.4 points, 2.7 rebounds, and 0.6 assists.

On September 8, 2026, Gibson was traded to the New Orleans Pelicans alongside AJ Johnson in exchange for Micah Peavy and Jordan Hawkins, but was subsequently waived by the Pelicans.

== Coaching career ==
On September 14, 2026, Gibson announced his retirement from the NBA to become an assistant coach under former teammate Tiago Splitter with the Chicago Bulls.

== Career statistics ==
Legend
GP	Games played	GS	Games started	MPG	Minutes per game
FG%	Field goal percentage	3P%	3-point field goal percentage	FT%	Free throw percentage
RPG	Rebounds per game	APG	Assists per game	SPG	Steals per game
BPG	Blocks per game	PPG	Points per game	**Bold**	Career high
*	Led the league

=== NBA ===
==== Regular season ====
Year	Team	GP	GS	MPG	FG%	3P%	FT%	RPG	APG	SPG	BPG	PPG
2010–11	Chicago	**82***	70	26.9	.494	—	.646	**7.5**	.9	.6	1.3	9.0
2010–11	Chicago	80	19	21.8	.466	.125	.676	5.7	.7	.7	1.3	7.1
2011–12	Chicago	63	0	20.4	.495	—	.622	5.3	.7	.4	1.3	7.7
2012–13	Chicago	65	5	22.5	.485	.000	.679	5.3	.9	.4	**1.4**	8.0
2013–14	Chicago	**82**	8	28.7	.479	.000	.751	6.8	1.1	.5	**1.4**	**13.0**
2014–15	Chicago	62	17	27.3	.502	—	.717	6.4	1.1	.6	1.2	10.3
2015–16	Chicago	73	55	26.5	.526	.000	.692	6.9	**1.5**	.6	1.1	8.6
2016–17	Chicago	55	55	27.3	.521	.167	.714	6.9	1.1	.5	.9	11.6
2016–17	Oklahoma City	23	16	21.2	.497	**1.000**	.718	4.5	.6	.6	.7	9.0
2017–18	Minnesota	**82***	**82***	**33.2**	.577	.200	.768	7.1	1.2	**.8**	.7	12.2
2018–19	Minnesota	70	57	24.1	.566	.324	.757	6.5	1.2	**.8**	.6	10.8
2019–20	New York	62	56	16.5	.584	.286	.732	4.3	.8	.4	.5	6.1
2020–21	New York	45	3	20.8	**.627**	.200	.727	5.6	.8	.7	1.1	5.4
2021–22	New York	52	4	18.2	.518	.395	.808	4.4	.6	.4	.8	4.4
2022–23	Washington	49	2	9.8	.520	.333	.714	1.9	.7	.3	.2	3.4
2023–24	New York	16	1	10.3	.304	.000	**1.000**	1.8	.6	.1	.4	1.0
2023–24	Detroit	4	0	9.8	.571	.500	—	2.3	.5	.3	.3	4.5
2024–25	Charlotte	37	11	11.1	.495	.500	.600	3.2	.6	.2	.5	2.9
2025–26	Memphis	10	1	9.7	.462	.500	.875	2.7	.6	.2	.1	3.4
Career		1,012	462	22.9	.517	.272	.713	5.7	.9	.5	1.0	8.3

==== Playoffs ====
Year	Team	GP	GS	MPG	FG%	3P%	FT%	RPG	APG	SPG	BPG	PPG
2010	Chicago	5	**5**	29.0	.421	—	.545	**7.0**	.6	.2	.6	7.6
2011	Chicago	**16**	0	17.8	.566	.000	.600	4.1	.6	.3	1.4	5.9
2012	Chicago	6	0	22.8	.457	—	.682	6.5	.7	.7	1.7	9.5
2013	Chicago	12	0	17.2	.470	.000	.727	3.0	.3	.3	.5	6.5
2014	Chicago	5	0	**30.8**	.561	—	.750	6.2	.4	.4	**2.4**	**18.2**
2015	Chicago	12	2	23.0	.472	—	.700	5.5	**1.0**	.3	1.0	7.4
2017	Oklahoma City	5	**5**	23.6	.600	—	.875	3.6	.6	.2	.0	9.8
2018	Minnesota	5	**5**	24.6	**.636**	—	**1.000**	4.0	.4	.2	.4	6.2
2021	New York	5	3	27.6	.600	—	**1.000**	**7.0**	.8	**1.6**	1.0	5.0
Career		71	20	22.3	.519	.000	.709	4.9	.6	.4	1.0	7.8

=== College ===
Year	Team	GP	GS	MPG	FG%	3P%	FT%	RPG	APG	SPG	BPG	PPG
2006–07	USC	37	37	32.4	.558	—	.623	8.7	1.5	.5	1.9	12.2
2007–08	USC	33	32	32.1	.580	—	.594	7.8	1.3	.7	2.5	10.8
2008–09	USC	35	35	33.7	.601	—	.659	9.0	1.3	1.0	2.9	14.3
Career		105	104	32.7	.580	—	.629	8.5	1.4	.7	2.4	12.4
