= 2013–14 Chicago Bulls season =

NBA professional basketball team season

- Head coach: Tom Thibodeau
- President: Michael Reinsdorf
- General manager: Gar Forman
- Owners: Jerry Reinsdorf
- Arena: United Center

Results
- Record: 48–34 (.585)
- Place: Division: 2nd (Central); Conference: 4th (Eastern)
- Playoff finish: First Round (lost to Wizards 1–4)
- Stats at Basketball Reference

Local media
- Television: WGN, WCIU, Comcast SportsNet Chicago
- Radio: WMVP

The 2013–14 Chicago Bulls season was the franchise's 48th season in the National Basketball Association (NBA). They finished the regular season with a record of 48–34, heading into the playoffs with the 4th seed in the Eastern Conference. They lost in the first round to the Washington Wizards in five games.

After a year absence, Derrick Rose returned to action during the season opener in Miami against the two-time defending champion Miami Heat, but on November 22, 2013, at Portland he injured his meniscus in his right knee and was once again put on injured reserve, ending his season after ten games.

Besides losing Rose, on January 7, 2014, the Bulls traded Luol Deng to the Cleveland Cavaliers for Andrew Bynum, who was waived immediately after the trade. This was the Bulls' first season since 2003-04 without Deng on the roster.

== Offseason ==
=== Draft picks ===
Round	Pick	Player	Position	Nationality	College/Club Team
1	20	Tony Snell	SF	United States	New Mexico
2	49	Erik Murphy	PF	United States / Finland	Florida

=== Player departures ===
The San Antonio Spurs signed Marco Belinelli on July 11. On July 26, Nate Robinson signed with the Denver Nuggets. On October 7, Vladimir Radmanović announced that he would be retiring after 12 seasons in the NBA.

=== Player signings ===
On July 10, the Bulls signed Mike Dunleavy Jr. The next day, Nazr Mohammed re-signed with the Bulls. The Bulls had signed Patrick Christopher, Mike James, Dahntay Jones, Kalin Lucas, Dexter Pittman, and D. J. White on September 27 to finalize its training camp roster.

== Standings ==
=== Central Division ===
Central Division	W	L	PCT	GB	Home	Road	Div	GP
c-Indiana Pacers	56	26	.683	–	35‍–‍6	21‍–‍20	12–4	82
x-Chicago Bulls	48	34	.585	8.0	27‍–‍14	21‍–‍20	11–5	82
Cleveland Cavaliers	33	49	.402	23.0	19‍–‍22	14‍–‍27	7–9	82
Detroit Pistons	29	53	.354	27.0	17‍–‍24	12‍–‍29	6–10	82
Milwaukee Bucks	15	67	.183	41.0	10‍–‍31	5‍–‍36	4–12	82

=== Eastern Conference ===
Standings

Eastern Conference
#	Team	W	L	PCT	GB	GP
1	c-Indiana Pacers *	56	26	.683	–	82
2	y-Miami Heat *	54	28	.659	2.0	82
3	y-Toronto Raptors *	48	34	.585	8.0	82
4	x-Chicago Bulls	48	34	.585	8.0	82
5	x-Washington Wizards	44	38	.537	12.0	82
6	x-Brooklyn Nets	44	38	.537	12.0	82
7	x-Charlotte Bobcats	43	39	.524	13.0	82
8	x-Atlanta Hawks	38	44	.463	18.0	82
9	New York Knicks	37	45	.451	19.0	82
10	Cleveland Cavaliers	33	49	.402	23.0	82
11	Detroit Pistons	29	53	.354	27.0	82
12	Boston Celtics	25	57	.305	31.0	82
13	Orlando Magic	23	59	.280	33.0	82
14	Philadelphia 76ers	19	63	.232	37.0	82
15	Milwaukee Bucks	15	67	.183	41.0	82

== Game log ==
=== Preseason ===
2013 pre-season game log
Total: 8–0 (home: 5–0; road: 3–0)
Pre-season: 8–0 (home: 5–0; road: 3–0)

Game	Date	Team	Score	High points	High rebounds	High assists	Location Attendance	Record
1	October 5	@ Indiana	W 82–76	Taj Gibson (18)	Taj Gibson (12)	Rose & Dunleavy (3)	Bankers Life Fieldhouse; 15,273	1–0
2	October 7	Memphis	W 106–87	Carlos Boozer (16)	Mohammed & Gibson (6)	Rose & Snell (3)	Scottrade Center; 13,497	2–0
3	October 12	@ Washington	W 83–81	Taj Gibson (18)	Boozer, Gibson, & Dunleavy (8)	Luol Deng (6)	HSBC Arena (at Rio de Janeiro, Brazil); 13,635	3–0
4	October 16	Detroit	W 96–81	Derrick Rose (22)	Taj Gibson (12)	Kirk Hinrich (5)	United Center; 21,405	4–0
5	October 18	Indiana	W 103–98	Derrick Rose (32)	Deng & Snell (6)	Derrick Rose (9)	United Center; 21,783	5–0
6	October 21	Milwaukee	W 105–84	Derrick Rose (24)	Carlos Boozer (10)	Mike Dunleavy Jr. (5)	United Center; 21,203	6–0
7	October 23	@ Oklahoma City	W 104–95	Derrick Rose (26)	Carlos Boozer (14)	Derrick Rose (6)	INTRUST Bank Arena; 15,004	7–0
8	October 25	Denver	W 94–89	Carlos Boozer (24)	Luol Deng (12)	Derrick Rose (8)	United Center; 21,773	8–0

2013–14 season schedule

=== Regular season ===
2013–14 game log
Total: 48–34 (home: 27–14; road: 21–20)
October: 1–1 (home: 1–0; road: 0–1)

Game	Date	Team	Score	High points	High rebounds	High assists	Location Attendance	Record
1	October 29	@ Miami	L 95–107	Carlos Boozer (31)	Joakim Noah (11)	Deng & Rose (4)	American Airlines Arena; 19,964	0–1
2	October 31	New York	W 82–81	Derrick Rose (18)	Joakim Noah (15)	Luol Deng (6)	United Center; 22,022	1–1

November : 6–7 (home: 4–0; road: 2–7)

Game	Date	Team	Score	High points	High rebounds	High assists	Location Attendance	Record
3	November 2	@ Philadelphia	L 104–107	Carlos Boozer (22)	Carlos Boozer (10)	Rose & Hinrich (6)	Wells Fargo Center; 15,782	1–2
4	November 6	@ Indiana	L 80–97	Deng & Rose (17)	Carlos Boozer (9)	Kirk Hinrich (5)	Bankers Life Fieldhouse; 18,165	1–3
5	November 8	Utah	W 97–73	Luol Deng (19)	Luol Deng (11)	Luol Deng (9)	United Center; 21,946	2–3
6	November 11	Cleveland	W 96–81	Carlos Boozer (17)	Taj Gibson (8)	Rose & Hinrich (7)	United Center; 21,778	3–3
7	November 15	@ Toronto	W 96–80	Luol Deng (19)	Deng & Noah (9)	Carlos Boozer (6)	Air Canada Centre; 19,800	4–3
8	November 16	Indiana	W 110–94	Luol Deng (23)	Taj Gibson (8)	Kirk Hinrich (8)	United Center; 22,158	5–3
9	November 18	Charlotte	W 86–81	Luol Deng (21)	Carlos Boozer (17)	Kirk Hinrich (7)	United Center; 21,628	6–3
10	November 21	@ Denver	L 87–97	Derrick Rose (19)	Luol Deng (13)	Joakim Noah (8)	Pepsi Center; 18,423	6–4
11	November 22	@ Portland	L 95–98	Derrick Rose (20)	Luol Deng (14)	Rose, Hinrich & Noah (3)	Moda Center; 20,618	6–5
12	November 24	@ L.A. Clippers	L 82–121	Luol Deng (22)	Nazr Mohammed (11)	Kirk Hinrich (7)	Staples Center; 19,245	6–6
13	November 25	@ Utah	L 83–89 (OT)	Carlos Boozer (26)	Carlos Boozer (16)	Kirk Hinrich (4)	EnergySolutions Arena; 18,936	6–7
14	November 27	@ Detroit	W 99–79	Luol Deng (27)	Taj Gibson (8)	Kirk Hinrich (7)	Palace of Auburn Hills; 14,228	7–7
15	November 30	@ Cleveland	L 93–97	Luol Deng (27)	Joakim Noah (8)	Luol Deng (11)	Quicken Loans Arena; 17,296	7–8

December : 5–10 (home: 2–7; road: 3–3)

Game	Date	Team	Score	High points	High rebounds	High assists	Location Attendance	Record
16	December 2	New Orleans	L 128–131 (3OT)	Luol Deng (37)	Taj Gibson (14)	Kirk Hinrich (11)	United Center; 21,615	7–9
17	December 5	Miami	W 107–87	Carlos Boozer (27)	Joakim Noah (15)	Kirk Hinrich (7)	United Center; 22,125	8–9
18	December 7	Detroit	L 75–92	Taj Gibson (21)	Taj Gibson (10)	Hinrich & Dunleavy (4)	United Center; 21,737	8–10
19	December 10	Milwaukee	L 74–78	Mike Dunleavy Jr. (24)	Carlos Boozer (12)	Kirk Hinrich (6)	United Center; 21,303	8–11
20	December 11	@ New York	L 78–83	Mike Dunleavy Jr. (20)	Carlos Boozer (12)	Joakim Noah (4)	Madison Square Garden; 19,812	8–12
21	December 13	@ Milwaukee	W 91–90	Joakim Noah (21)	Joakim Noah (18)	Kirk Hinrich (8)	BMO Harris Bradley Center; 15,219	9–12
22	December 14	Toronto	L 77–99	Luol Deng (17)	Joakim Noah (12)	D. J. Augustin (6)	United Center; 21,386	9–13
23	December 16	Orlando	L 82–83	Luol Deng (26)	Carlos Boozer (13)	D. J. Augustin (8)	United Center; 21,200	9–14
24	December 18	@ Houston	L 94–109	Jimmy Butler (20)	Joakim Noah (10)	D. J. Augustin (9)	Toyota Center; 18,242	9–15
25	December 19	@ Oklahoma City	L 95–107	Joakim Noah (23)	Joakim Noah (12)	Mike Dunleavy Jr. (6)	Chesapeake Energy Arena; 18,203	9–16
26	December 21	Cleveland	W 100–84	Carlos Boozer (19)	Joakim Noah (18)	D. J. Augustin (10)	United Center; 21,658	10–16
27	December 25	@ Brooklyn	W 95–78	Taj Gibson (20)	Gibson & Noah (8)	D. J. Augustin (5)	Barclays Center; 17,732	11–16
28	December 28	Dallas	L 83–105	Joakim Noah (20)	Joakim Noah (10)	Jimmy Butler (5)	United Center; 22,099	11–17
29	December 30	@ Memphis	W 95–91	Jimmy Butler (26)	Boozer & Noah (10)	D. J. Augustin (9)	FedExForum; 17,688	12–17
30	December 31	Toronto	L 79–85	Luol Deng (16)	Joakim Noah (16)	Joakim Noah (6)	United Center; 21,507	12–18

January : 11–4 (home: 6–3; road: 5–1)

Game	Date	Team	Score	High points	High rebounds	High assists	Location Attendance	Record
31	January 2	Boston	W 94–82	Joakim Noah (17)	Joakim Noah (11)	Joakim Noah (9)	United Center; 21,721	13–18
32	January 4	Atlanta	W 91–84	Mike Dunleavy Jr. (20)	Gibson & Noah (12)	D. J. Augustin (7)	United Center; 21,539	14–18
33	January 7	Phoenix	W 92–87	Taj Gibson (19)	Joakim Noah (16)	D. J. Augustin (9)	United Center; 21,181	15–18
34	January 10	@ Milwaukee	W 81–72	Carlos Boozer (19)	Carlos Boozer (13)	Joakim Noah (7)	BMO Harris Bradley Center; 15,148	16–18
35	January 11	Charlotte	W 103–97	D. J. Augustin (20)	Joakim Noah (14)	D. J. Augustin (12)	United Center; 21,413	17–18
36	January 13	Washington	L 88–102	Carlos Boozer (19)	Joakim Noah (16)	Kirk Hinrich (8)	United Center; 21,287	17–19
37	January 15	@ Orlando	W 128–125 (3OT)	Joakim Noah (26)	Joakim Noah (19)	D. J. Augustin (9)	Amway Center; 16,489	18–19
38	January 17	@ Washington	L 93–96	Kirk Hinrich (18)	Joakim Noah (12)	Joakim Noah (6)	Verizon Center; 17,005	18–20
39	January 18	Philadelphia	W 103–78	Joakim Noah (21)	Joakim Noah (16)	D. J. Augustin (8)	United Center; 21,710	19–20
40	January 20	L.A. Lakers	W 102–100	D. J. Augustin (27)	Joakim Noah (21)	Joakim Noah (6)	United Center; 21,626	20–20
41	January 22	@ Cleveland	W 98–87	D. J. Augustin (27)	Joakim Noah (18)	D. J. Augustin (7)	Quicken Loans Arena; 16,890	21–20
42	January 24	L.A. Clippers	L 95–112	Carlos Boozer (22)	Joakim Noah (13)	Joakim Noah (7)	United Center; 21,755	21–21
43	January 25	@ Charlotte	W 89–87	D. J. Augustin (28)	Joakim Noah (10)	Joakim Noah (8)	Time Warner Cable Arena; 18,252	22–21
44	January 27	Minnesota	L 86–95	Carlos Boozer (20)	Carlos Boozer (14)	D. J. Augustin (6)	United Center; 21,637	22–22
45	January 29	@ San Antonio	W 96–86	Jimmy Butler (19)	Carlos Boozer (12)	Joakim Noah (8)	AT&T Center; 18,581	23–22

February : 9–4 (home: 4–0; road: 5–4)

Game	Date	Team	Score	High points	High rebounds	High assists	Location Attendance	Record
46	February 1	@ New Orleans	L 79–88	D. J. Augustin (23)	Joakim Noah (16)	D. J. Augustin (7)	New Orleans Arena; 17,799	23–23
47	February 3	@ Sacramento	L 70–99	Jimmy Butler (17)	Carlos Boozer (9)	D. J. Augustin (7)	Sleep Train Arena; 15,178	23–24
48	February 4	@ Phoenix	W 100–92	Carlos Boozer (19)	Joakim Noah (14)	Jimmy Butler (4)	US Airways Center; 16,636	24–24
49	February 6	@ Golden State	L 87–102	Taj Gibson (26)	Taj Gibson (13)	Joakim Noah (11)	Oracle Arena; 19,596	24–25
50	February 9	@ L.A. Lakers	W 92–86	Joakim Noah (20)	Joakim Noah (13)	D. J. Augustin (6)	Staples Center; 18,997	25–25
51	February 11	Atlanta	W 100–85	Taj Gibson (24)	Joakim Noah (16)	Joakim Noah (11)	United Center; 21,325	26–25
52	February 13	Brooklyn	W 92–76	Carlos Boozer (15)	Joakim Noah (13)	Hinrich & Noah (7)	United Center; 21,500	27–25
All-Star Break
53	February 19	@ Toronto	W 94–92	Carlos Boozer (20)	Mike Dunleavy Jr. (11)	Joakim Noah (13)	Air Canada Centre; 17,704	28–25
54	February 21	Denver	W 117–89	D. J. Augustin (22)	Joakim Noah (11)	D. J. Augustin (8)	United Center; 21,621	29–25
55	February 23	@ Miami	L 79–93	Gibson & Noah (20)	Joakim Noah (15)	D. J. Augustin (5)	American Airlines Arena; 19,848	29–26
56	February 25	@ Atlanta	W 107–103	Mike Dunleavy Jr. (22)	Joakim Noah (12)	D. J. Augustin (6)	Philips Arena; 12,418	30–26
57	February 26	Golden State	L 83–103	Taj Gibson (21)	Joakim Noah (17)	Joakim Noah (7)	United Center; 21,701	31–26
58	February 28	@ Dallas	W 100–91	Taj Gibson (20)	Taj Gibson (15)	Gibson & Dunleavy (4)	American Airlines Center; 20,398	32–26

March : 10–6 (home: 7–4; road: 3–2)

Game	Date	Team	Score	High points	High rebounds	High assists	Location Attendance	Record
59	March 2	New York	W 109–90	D. J. Augustin (23)	Joakim Noah (12)	Joakim Noah (14)	United Center; 21,739	33–26
60	March 3	@ Brooklyn	L 80–96	D. J. Augustin (16)	Carlos Boozer (13)	Augustin & Dunleavy (4)	Barclays Center; 17,732	33–27
61	March 5	@ Detroit	W 105–94	D. J. Augustin (26)	Jimmy Butler (12)	Joakim Noah (11)	Palace of Auburn Hills; 14,007	34–27
62	March 7	Memphis	L 77–85	Taj Gibson (18)	Boozer & Noah (8)	Joakim Noah (6)	United Center; 21,218	34–28
63	March 9	Miami	W 95–88 (OT)	D. J. Augustin (22)	Joakim Noah (12)	Joakim Noah (7)	United Center; 22,028	35–28
64	March 11	San Antonio	L 96–104	D. J. Augustin (24)	Joakim Noah (8)	Joakim Noah (7)	United Center; 21,634	35–29
65	March 13	Houston	W 111–87	Mike Dunleavy Jr. (21)	Joakim Noah (10)	Joakim Noah (9)	United Center; 21,747	36–29
66	March 15	Sacramento	W 94–87	Joakim Noah (23)	Joakim Noah (11)	Joakim Noah (8)	United Center; 22,012	37–29
67	March 17	Oklahoma City	L 85–97	Taj Gibson (16)	Joakim Noah (12)	Joakim Noah (9)	United Center; 22,261	37–30
68	March 19	@ Philadelphia	W 102–94	D. J. Augustin (20)	Taj Gibson (13)	Joakim Noah (6)	Wells Fargo Center; 13,222	38–30
69	March 21	@ Indiana	L 79–91	Butler & Augustin (17)	Joakim Noah (13)	Joakim Noah (6)	Bankers Life Fieldhouse; 18,165	38–31
70	March 22	Philadelphia	W 91–81	Joakim Noah (20)	Taj Gibson (10)	Butler & Augustin (6)	United Center; 21,799	39–31
71	March 24	Indiana	W 89–77	Taj Gibson (23)	Carlos Boozer (10)	Joakim Noah (8)	United Center; 21,803	40–31
72	March 28	Portland	L 74–91	Carlos Boozer (16)	Carlos Boozer (12)	D. J. Augustin (7)	United Center; 22,055	40–32
73	March 30	@ Boston	W 107–102	D. J. Augustin (33)	Gibson & Noah (8)	Joakim Noah (13)	TD Garden; 18,624	41–32
74	March 31	Boston	W 94–80	Mike Dunleavy Jr. (22)	Gibson & Noah (11)	D. J. Augustin (11)	United Center; 21,494	42–32

April : 6–2 (home: 3–0; road: 3–2)

Game	Date	Team	Score	High points	High rebounds	High assists	Location Attendance	Record
75	April 2	@ Atlanta	W 105–92	D. J. Augustin (23)	Joakim Noah (10)	Noah & Hinrich (6)	Philips Arena; 17,029	43–32
76	April 4	Milwaukee	W 102–90	Hinrich & Butler (17)	Joakim Noah (13)	D. J. Augustin (6)	United Center; 21,996	44–32
77	April 5	@ Washington	W 96–78	D. J. Augustin (25)	Joakim Noah (12)	Jimmy Butler (9)	Verizon Center; 19,661	45–32
78	April 9	@ Minnesota	W 102–87	D. J. Augustin (21)	Joakim Noah (13)	Joakim Noah (10)	Target Center; 13,447	46–32
79	April 11	Detroit	W 106–98	D. J. Augustin (24)	Joakim Noah (12)	Joakim Noah (10)	United Center; 22,219	47–32
80	April 13	@ New York	L 89–100	Jimmy Butler (17)	Joakim Noah (17)	Joakim Noah (9)	Madison Square Garden; 19,812	47–33
81	April 14	Orlando	W 108–95	Mike Dunleavy Jr. (22)	Carlos Boozer (12)	Joakim Noah (8)	United Center; 22,087	48–33
82	April 16	@ Charlotte	L 86–91 (OT)	D. J. Augustin (17)	Joakim Noah (13)	Hinrich & Noah (6)	Time Warner Cable Arena; 17,627	48–34

2013–14 season schedule

== Playoffs ==
=== Game log ===
2014 playoff game log
Total: 1–4 (home: 0–3; road: 1–1)
First Round: 1–4 (home: 0–3; road: 1–1)

Game	Date	Team	Score	High points	High rebounds	High assists	Location Attendance	Series
1	April 20	Washington	L 93–102	Augustin & Hinrich (16)	Joakim Noah (10)	Joakim Noah (4)	United Center; 21,694	0–1
2	April 22	Washington	L 99–101 (OT)	D. J. Augustin (25)	Joakim Noah (12)	D. J. Augustin (7)	United Center; 21,663	0–2
3	April 25	@ Washington	W 100–97	Mike Dunleavy Jr. (35)	Joakim Noah (9)	D. J. Augustin (7)	Verizon Center; 23,356	1–2
4	April 27	@ Washington	L 89–98	Taj Gibson (32)	Joakim Noah (15)	Kirk Hinrich (7)	Verizon Center; 20,356	1–3
5	April 29	Washington	L 69–75	Hinrich & Butler (16)	Joakim Noah (18)	Joakim Noah (7)	United Center; 21,752	1–4

2014 playoff schedule

== Player statistics ==
Statistics

Legend
GP	Games played	GS	Games started	MPG	Minutes per game
FG%	Field-goal percentage	3P%	3-point field-goal percentage	FT%	Free-throw percentage
RPG	Rebounds per game	APG	Assists per game	SPG	Steals per game
BPG	Blocks per game	PPG	Points per game

Regular season

Player	GP	GS	MPG	FG%	3P%	FT%	RPG	APG	SPG	BPG	PPG
D. J. Augustin	56	9	30.4	.419	.411	.893	2.0	5.1	0.86	0.05	14.5
Carlos Boozer	70	70	28.4	.452	.000	.764	8.4	1.5	0.70	0.31	13.8
Jimmy Butler	61	61	38.2	.396	.284	.775	5.0	2.4	1.95	0.56	13.2
Mike Dunleavy Jr.	76	55	31.1	.426	.376	.854	4.2	2.3	0.79	0.57	11.1
Jimmer Fredette	6	0	3.7	.429	.500	.000	0.7	0.2	0.00	0.00	2.5
Taj Gibson	76	8	28.8	.484	.000	.747	6.9	1.1	0.53	1.36	13.2
Kirk Hinrich	67	55	29.1	.386	.349	.760	2.7	3.9	1.12	0.36	9.0
Mike James	11	0	7.0	.238	.200	.000	0.6	1.5	0.18	0.00	1.0
Cartier Martin	6	0	8.0	.625	.600	.500	0.8	0.3	0.17	0.00	2.5
Nazr Mohammed	74	1	7.2	.410	.000	.533	2.3	0.3	0.18	0.39	1.5
Erik Murphy	24	0	2.6	.231	.000	.000	0.3	0.1	0.00	0.17	0.3
Joakim Noah	74	74	34.9	.476	.000	.731	11.3	5.4	1.24	1.50	12.4
Derrick Rose	10	10	31.1	.354	.340	.844	3.2	4.3	0.50	0.10	15.9
Tornike Shengelia	8	0	1.9	.500	.000	.000	0.3	0.3	0.13	0.00	0.3
Tony Snell	71	12	16.7	.380	.322	.757	1.7	1.0	0.38	0.21	4.7
Marquis Teague	19	2	12.7	.242	.200	.688	1.0	1.5	0.11	0.21	2.4
Jarvis Varnado	1	0	2.0	.000	.200	.000	0.0	0.0	0.00	0.00	0.0

== Roster ==
2013–14 Chicago Bulls roster
Players

Pos.	No.	Player	Height	Weight	DOB	From
F	17	Lou Amundson	6 ft 9 in (2.06 m)	225 lb (102 kg)	1982-12-07	UNLV
G	14	D. J. Augustin	6 ft 0 in (1.83 m)	183 lb (83 kg)	1987-11-10	Texas
F	5	Carlos Boozer	6 ft 9 in (2.06 m)	266 lb (121 kg)	1981-11-20	Duke
G	11	Ronnie Brewer	6 ft 7 in (2.01 m)	235 lb (107 kg)	1985-03-20	Arkansas
G/F	21	Jimmy Butler	6 ft 7 in (2.01 m)	220 lb (100 kg)	1989-09-14	Marquette
F	34	Mike Dunleavy Jr.	6 ft 9 in (2.06 m)	230 lb (104 kg)	1980-09-15	Duke
G	32	Jimmer Fredette	6 ft 2 in (1.88 m)	195 lb (88 kg)	1989-02-25	BYU
F	22	Taj Gibson	6 ft 9 in (2.06 m)	225 lb (102 kg)	1985-06-24	USC
G	12	Kirk Hinrich	6 ft 4 in (1.93 m)	190 lb (86 kg)	1981-01-02	Kansas
G	8	Mike James	6 ft 2 in (1.88 m)	188 lb (85 kg)	1975-06-23	Duquesne
C	48	Nazr Mohammed	6 ft 10 in (2.08 m)	250 lb (113 kg)	1977-09-05	Kentucky
C	13	Joakim Noah	6 ft 11 in (2.11 m)	232 lb (105 kg)	1985-02-25	Florida
G	1	Derrick Rose	6 ft 3 in (1.91 m)	190 lb (86 kg)	1988-10-04	Memphis
F	9	Greg Smith	6 ft 10 in (2.08 m)	250 lb (113 kg)	1991-01-08	Fresno State
G	20	Tony Snell	6 ft 7 in (2.01 m)	200 lb (91 kg)	1991-11-10	New Mexico

Coaches
Head coach
- Tom Thibodeau
Assistant(s)
- Andy Greer
- Adrian Griffin
- Ed Pinckney
- Mike Wilhelm
- Fred Tedeschi (trainer)

Legend
- (DP) Unsigned draft pick
- (FA) Free agent
- (S) Suspended
- (DL) On assignment to D-League affiliate
- Injured

Roster
Updated: April 14, 2014
