= High School of Telecommunication Arts and Technology =

Public school in New York City

Coordinates: 40.6368°N 74.0233°W

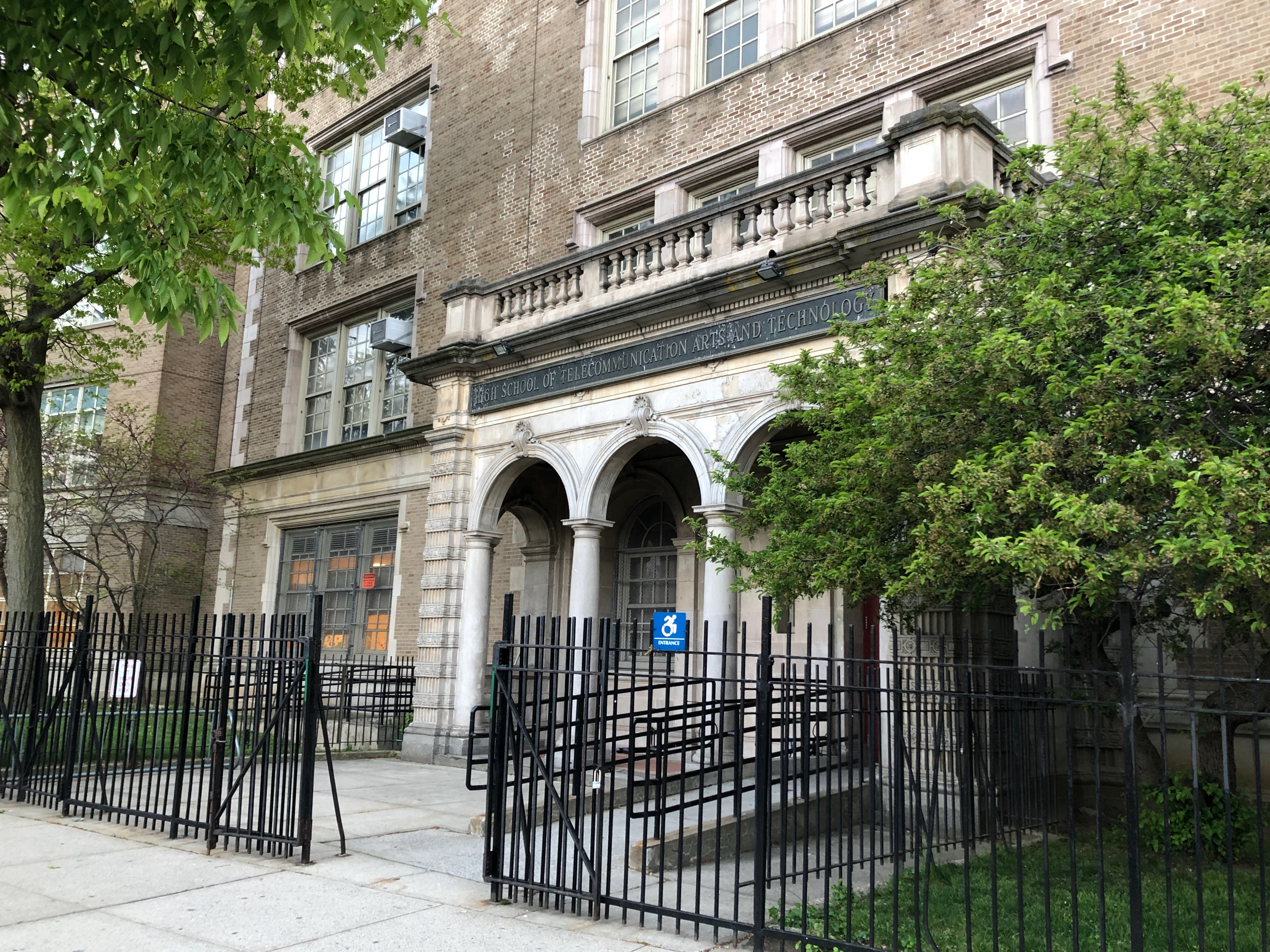
Building in 2022

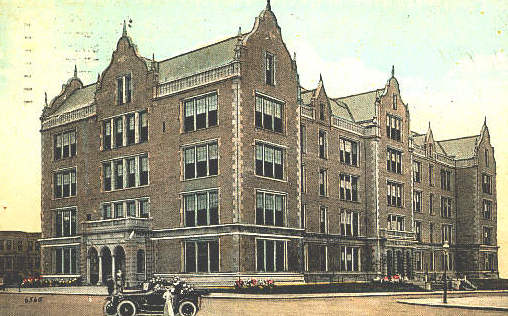
Building in 1920

High School of Telecommunication Arts and Technology is a public high school in Bay Ridge, Brooklyn. It was established in the 1980s with a focus on preparing students for careers working with computers, including by teaching about word processing and databases. It has a software engineering program that is based around the CS4ALL curriculum.

It is located at 350 67th Street, Brooklyn, NY 11220. It has 1300 students.

The school is in a Gothic style building. The building was formerly Bay Ridge High School. As Bay Ridge High school, it was all girls, but it is now coed.

In 2016, the school established a rooftop greenhouse for teaching about botany and food production. A biology teacher won the New York Academy of Sciences STEM Teacher of the Year award in 2025.

== Notable alumni ==
- Josh Palacios, baseball player
- Taj Gibson, basketball player
